= List of Russian military bases =

This is a list of active Russian military bases in Russia and territories occupied by Russia.

== Russian Ground Forces and Airborne Forces ==
=== Leningrad Military District ===
Name	Location	Units	Citations
Agalatovo	Leningrad Oblast	HQ, 6th Army	
Sapyornoye	Leningrad Oblast	Flamethrower Battalion	
Kamenka	Leningrad Oblast	138th Separate Guards Motor Rifle Brigade	
Pskov and Luga	Leningrad Oblast	25th Separate Guards Motor Rifle Brigade	
Gorelovo	Leningrad Oblast	5th Anti-Aircraft Missile Brigade	
Luga	Leningrad Oblast	9th Guards Artillery Brigade 26th Rocket Brigade	
Pskov	Pskov Oblast	HQ, 76th Guards Air Assault Division 234th Guards Air Assault Regiment 1140th Guards Artillery Regiment 124th Separate Tank Battalion 175th Separate Recon Battalion	
Cherekha	Pskov Oblast	104th Guards Air Assault Regiment	
Promezhitsy	Pskov Oblast	2nd Guards Spetsnaz Brigade	
Gusev	Kaliningrad Oblast	18th Guards Motor Rifle Division 11th Tank Regiment 275th Motorized Rifle Regiment 280th Motorized Rifle Regiment	
Sovetsk	Kaliningrad Oblast	79th Motorized Rifle Regiment 20th Recon Battalion	
Chernyakhovsk	Kaliningrad Oblast	152nd Missile Brigade	

=== Moscow Military District ===
Name	Location	Units	Citations
Bakovka	Moscow Oblast	HQ, 1st Tank Army	
Mosrentgen	Moscow Oblast	27th Motor Rifle Brigade	
Naro-Fominsk	Moscow Oblast	HQ, 4th Tank Division 12th Tank Regiment 13th Tank Regiment 423rd Motor Rifle Regiment 137th Recon Battalion 275th Self-Propelled Artillery Regiment 1182nd Artillery Regiment	
Kubinka	Moscow Oblast	45th Guards Spetsnaz Brigade	
Kubinka-2	Moscow Oblast	HQ, Special Operations Forces Special Purpose Center (Kubinka-2)	
Kalininets	Moscow Oblast	HQ, 2nd Motor Rifle Division 15th Motor Rifle Regiment 1st Motor Rifle Regiment 1st Tank Regiment 1174th Anti-Tank Battalion	
Kobyakovo	Moscow Oblast	136th Recon Battalion 147th Self-Propelled Artillery Regiment	
Senezh	Moscow Oblast	Special Purpose Center (Senezh)	
Kolomna	Moscow Oblast	236th Artillery Brigade	
Tver	Tver Oblast	79th Reactive Artillery Brigade	
Ivanovo	Ivanovo Oblast	HQ, 98th Airborne Division 217th Airborne Regiment 215th Separate Recon Battalion	
Kostroma	Ivanovo Oblast	331st Airborne Regiment 1065th Artillery Regiment	
Shuya	Ivanovo Oblast	112th Missile Brigade	
Tula	Tula Oblast	HQ, 106th Airborne Division 51st Airborne Regiment 173rd Separate Recon Battalion Separate Tank Battalion	
Ryazan	Ryazan Oblast	137th Airborne Regiment	
Yelnya	Smolensk Oblast	HQ, 144th Motor Rifle Division 1281st Anti-Tank Battalion 59th Tank Regiment	
Smolensk	Smolensk Oblast	148th Recon Battalion	
Klintsy	Bryansk Oblast	488th Motor Rifle Regiment 254th Motor Rifle Regiment	
Pochep	Bryansk Oblast	856th Self-Propelled Artillery Regiment	
Tambov	Tambov Oblast	45th High-Power Artillery Brigade 16th Special Forces Brigade	
Kursk	Kursk Oblast	448th Missile Brigade	
Voronezh	Voronezh Oblast	HQ, 20th Army Special Forces Strengthened Company	
Boguchar	Voronezh Oblast	HQ, 3rd Motor Rifle Division 252nd Motor Rifle Regiment 159th Separate Anti-Tank Battalion 99th Self-Propelled Artillery Regiment	
Valuyki and Soloti	Belgorod Oblast	752nd Motor Rifle Regiment 237th Tank Regiment 84th Recon Battalion	
Mulino	Nizhny Novgorod Oblast	HQ, 3rd Army Corps 47th Tank Division 288th Artillery Brigade 26th Tank Regiment	
Unknown exact location	Nizhny Novgorod Oblast	HQ, 6th Motor Rifle Division 72nd Motor Rifle Brigade 17th High-Power Artillery Brigade 27th Artillery Regiment 54th Motor Rifle Regiment 55th Motor Rifle Regiment 10th Tank Regiment	
Sormovo	Nizhny Novgorod Oblast	96th Recon Brigade	
Tsentralnyy	Nizhny Novgorod Oblast	Flamethrower Battalion	

=== Eastern Military District ===
Name	Location	Units	Citations
Chita	Zabaykalsky Krai	HQ, 29th Army	
Borzya	Zabaykalsky Krai	36th Separate Guards Motor Rifle Brigade	
Drovyanaya	Zabaykalsky Krai		
Gorny	Zabaykalsky Krai	19th NBC Protection Regiment	
Domna	Zabaykalsky Krai	140th Anti-Aircraft Missile Brigade	
Ulan-Ude	Republic of Buryatia	HQ, 36th Army	
Divizionnaya station	Republic of Buryatia	5th Guards Tank Brigade 103rd Rocket Brigade	
Taltsy station	Republic of Buryatia	30th Artillery Brigade	
Kyakhta	Republic of Buryatia	37th Separate Guards Motor Rifle Brigade	
Sosnovyy Bor	Republic of Buryatia	11th Guards Air Assault Brigade	
Onokhoy	Republic of Buryatia	26th NBC Protection Regiment	
Belogorsk	Amur Oblast	HQ, 35th Army 38th Separate Guards Motor Rifle Brigade	
Nikolskoye	Amur Oblast		
Semistochny	Jewish Autonomous Oblast	107th Rocket Brigade	
Babstovo	Jewish Autonomous Oblast	69th Covering Brigade	
Knyaze-Volkonskoye	Khabarovsk Krai	64th Separate Guards Motor Rifle Brigade	

=== Central Military District ===
Name	Location	Units	Citations
Novosibirsk	Novosibirsk Oblast	HQ, 41st Army 24th Special Forces Brigade Yenisei Armored Train	
Shilovo	Novosibirsk Oblast	Special Forces Company	
Yurga	Kemerovo Oblast	120th Artillery Brigade 74th Motor Rifle Brigade	
Topchikha	Altai Krai	Flamethrower Battalion	
Aleysk	Altai Krai	35th Motor Rifle Brigade	
Kyzyl	Tyva Republic	55th Motor Rifle Brigade (Mountain)	
Ulyanovsk	Ulyanovsk Oblast	31st Air Assault Brigade	
Roshchinsky	Samara Oblast	15th Motor Rifle Brigade 30th Motor Rifle Brigade	
Samara	Samara Oblast	HQ, 2nd Army Flamethrower Battalion	
Tolyatti	Samara Oblast	3rd Special Forces Brigade	
Totskoye	Orenburg Oblast	950th Reactive Artillery Regiment 385th Artillery Brigade 21st Motor Rifle Brigade (Heavy) 92nd Missile Brigade	
Yekaterinburg	Sverdlovsk Oblast	228th Motor Rifle Regiment	
Yelanskiy	Sverdlovsk Oblast	119th Missile Brigade	
Chebarkul	Chelyabinsk Oblast	HQ, 90th Tank Division 400th Self-Propelled Artillery Regiment 239th Tank Regiment 6th Tank Regiment 80th Tank Regiment 30th Recon Battalion	
Shchuchye	Kurgan Oblast	232nd Reactive Artillery Brigade	

=== Southern Military District ===
Name	Location	Units	Citations
Novocherkassk	Rostov Oblast	HQ, 8th Army 103rd Motor Rifle Regiment	
Kadamovskiy	Rostov Oblast	HQ, 150th Motor Rifle Division	
Persianovskiy	Rostov Oblast	102nd Motor Rifle Regiment 68th Tank Regiment 163rd Tank Regiment 174th Separate Recon Battalion Separate Anti-Tank Artillery Battalion	
Kuzminka	Rostov Oblast	381st Artillery Regiment	
Bataysk and Stepnoy	Rostov Oblast	22nd Spetsnaz Brigade	
Korenovsk	Krasnodar Krai	238th Artillery Brigade 47th Missile Brigade	
Oktyabrsky	Volgograd Oblast	Flamethrower Battalion	
Volgograd	Volgograd Oblast	HQ, 20th Motor Rifle Division 242nd Motor Rifle Regiment 255th Motor Rifle Regiment "Amur" Armored Train	
Kamyshin	Volgograd Oblast	33rd Motor Rifle Regiment	
Znamensk	Astrakhan Oblast	40th Missile Brigade 439th Reactive Artillery Brigade	
Feodosia	Occupied Crimea	56th Air Assault Regiment 171st Separate Air Assault Battalion	
Novorossiysk	Krasnodar Krai	HQ, 7th Guards Mountain Air Assault Division 108th Guards Air Assault Regiment 104th Separate Tank Battalion 162nd Separate Recon Battalion 1141st Artillery Regiment	
Molkino	Krasnodar Krai	10th Spetsnaz Brigade 1st Missile Brigade	
Krasnooktyabrskiy	Republic of Adygea	227th Artillery Brigade	
Storozhevaya	Karachay-Cherkess Republic	34th Mountain Motor Rifle Brigade	
Stavropol	Stavropol Krai	HQ, 49th Army 247th Guards Air Assault Regiment 19th Separate Spetsnaz Company 25th Spetsnaz Regiment	
Budyonnovsk	Stavropol Krai	205th Motor Rifle Brigade	
Nevinnomyssk	Stavropol Krai	"Baikal" Armored Train	
Gudauta	Occupied Georgia	7th Military Base	
Tskhinvali and Java	Occupied Georgia	4th Guards Military Base	
Prokhladny	Kabardino-Balkar Republic	346th Spetsnaz Brigade	
Vladikavkaz	Republic of North Ossetia-Alania	HQ, 58th Army 429th Motor Rifle Regiment HQ, 19th Motor Rifle Division	
Mozdok	Republic of North Ossetia-Alania	100th Recon Brigade 12th Missile Brigade	
Troitskaya	Republic of Ingushetia	291st Artillery Brigade Flamethrower Battalion	
Nesterovskaya	Republic of Ingushetia	503rd Motor Rifle Regiment	
Buynaksk	Republic of Dagestan	136th Motor Rifle Brigade	
Borzoy	Chechen Republic	291st Motor Rifle Regiment	
Khankala	Chechen Republic	HQ, 42nd Guards Motor Rifle Division	
Shali	Chechen Republic	70th Motor Rifle Regiment 50th Self-Propelled Artillery Regiment Separate Tank Battalion	
Grozny	Chechen Republic	78th Special Motorized Regiment "North-Akhmat" 417th Separate Recon Battalion 150th Separate Anti-Tank Artillery Battalion	
Kalinovskaya	Chechen Republic	71st Motor Rifle Regiment	

== Russian Aerospace Forces & Russian Naval Aviation ==
Name	Location	Aircraft / Units	Citations
Chkalovsk air base	Kaliningrad Oblast	Su-27 Su-24M Su-30M2/Su-30SM MiG-31	
Gvardeysk	Kaliningrad Oblast	183rd Anti-Aircraft Missile Regiment: S-400; S-300PS; Pantsir-S1	
Chernyakhovsk air base	Kaliningrad Oblast		
Khrabrovo Airport	Kaliningrad Oblast	Mi-24 Fixed-wing transports	
Kruglovo	Kaliningrad Oblast	1545th Anti-Aircraft Missile Regiment: S-400	
Donskoye air base	Kaliningrad Oblast	Ka-27/Ka-27PL/Ka-27PS/Ka-27M Ka-29 Mi-24 Mi-8 Be-12	
Monchegorsk air base	Murmansk Oblast	MiG-31BM Su-24M Su-24MR Mi-24	
Olenya air base	Murmansk Oblast	Tu-22M3 Tu-95MS Tu-160 An-12	
Severomorsk-1 air base	Murmansk Oblast	Il-38N Tu-142 Ka-27 Ka-27M Ka-29 Ka-32 Mi-8 Orlan UAVs	
Severomorsk-3 air base	Murmansk Oblast	Su-33 MiG-29KR	
Olenegorsk	Murmansk Oblast	583rd Anti-Aircraft Missile Regiment: S-300PM; S-300PS	
Polyarny and Gadzhiyevo	Murmansk Oblast	531st Anti-Aircraft Missile Regiment: S-400; Pantsir-S1	
Severodvinsk	Arkhangelsk Oblast	1528th Anti-Aircraft Missile Regiment: S-400	
Rogachevo	Arkhangelsk Oblast	33rd Anti-Aircraft Missile Regiment: S-400; Pantsir-S1; S-300	
Amderma-2 (Rogachevo) air base	Arkhangelsk Oblast	MiG-31BM MiG-29KR	
Plesetsk air base	Arkhangelsk Oblast	An-26 Mi-8 Orlan UAVs	
Alexandra Land, Franz Josef Land	Arkhangelsk Oblast	Anti-Aircraft Battalion: Pantsir-S1	
Nagurskoye air base	Arkhangelsk Oblast		
Besovets air base	Republic of Karelia	Su-35S	
Sredny air base	Krasnoyarsk Krai		
Temp air base	Sakha Republic	Anti-Aircraft Battalion: Pantsir-S1	
Tiksi air base	Sakha Republic	155th Anti-Aircraft Missile Regiment: S-300PS	
Mys Shmidta air base	Chukotka Autonomous Okrug		
Ugolny air base	Chukotka Autonomous Okrug	MiG-31BM Orlan UAVs Mi-8AMTSh-VA Mi-8 Mi-26	
Yelizovo air base	Kamchatka Krai	MiG-31 MiG-31BM Il-38/Il-38N Be-12 Ka-27 Ka-29 Mi-8AMTSh-VA Orlan UAVs	
Matua air base	Sakhalin Oblast		
Yasny air base	Sakhalin Oblast	Su-35S	
Burevestnik helicopter base	Sakhalin Oblast	Transport helicopters	
Iturup/Etorofu Island	Sakhalin Oblast	38th Anti-Aircraft Missile Brigade: S-300V4	
Khomutovo	Sakhalin Oblast	1724th Anti-Aircraft Missile Regiment: S-400; Pantsir-S1	
Sokol air base	Sakhalin Oblast		
Sovetskaya Gavan air base	Khabarovsk Krai	Tu-142MZ/Tu-142MR/Tu-142M3	
Sovetskiy air base	Komi Republic	Tu-22M3	
Sokolovka air base	Primorsky Krai	MiG-31BM	
Nikolayevka Primorskaya air base	Primorsky Krai	Ka-29 Ka-27/Ka-27M Il-38/Il-38N	
Nakhodka	Primorsky Krai	589th Anti-Aircraft Missile Regiment: S-400; Pantsir-S2	
Vladivostok	Primorsky Krai	1533rd Anti-Aircraft Missile Regiment: S-400; S-300V; Pantsir-S2	
Centralnaya Uglovaya air base	Primorsky Krai	MiG-31BSM Su-35S Su-30 Su-27	
Vladivostok air base	Primorsky Krai	An-26 An-12	
Vozdvizhenka air base	Primorsky Krai		
Chernigovka air base	Primorsky Krai	Su-25SM Ka-52 Mi-8AMTSh	
Varfolomeyevka air base	Primorsky Krai	Su-24MR	
Khabarovsk	Khabarovsk Krai	1529th Anti-Aircraft Missile Regiment: S-400; Anti-Aircraft Unit: Pantsir-S	
Bolshoy air base	Khabarovsk Krai	Mi-24 Ka-52 Mi-8AMTSh/Mi-8AMTSh-VA Mi-8MT Mi-26 An-12 An-26 Il-20M	
Khurba air base	Khabarovsk Krai	Su-34	
Bolshaya Kartel	Khabarovsk Krai	1530th Anti-Aircraft Missile Regiment: S-400; Pantsir-S	
Dzemgi air base	Khabarovsk Krai	Su-35S	
Birobidzhan	Jewish Autonomous Oblast	38th Anti-Aircraft Missile Brigade: S-300V4	
Ukrainka air base	Amur Oblast	Tu-95MS	
Step air base	Zabaykalsky Krai		
Kashtak	Zabaykalsky Krai	1723rd Anti-Aircraft Missile Regiment: S-300PS	
Cheremushki helicopter base	Zabaykalsky Krai	Mi-24P Mi-8AMTSh Mi-8MT/MTV-2	
Angarsk	Irkutsk Oblast	1534th Anti-Aircraft Missile Regiment: S-300PM-2	
Belaya air base	Irkutsk Oblast	Tu-22M3 An-30	
Dalniy (Kansk) air base	Krasnoyarsk Krai	MiG-31BM	
Achinsk	Krasnoyarsk Krai	388th Anti-Aircraft Missile Regiment: S-300PM2; S-300P	
Kyzyl air base	Tyva Republic	An-26 Mi-8AMTSh	
Abakan	Republic of Khakassia	24th Anti-Aircraft Missile Brigade: S-300PS; Air Defence Regiment: Pantsir-S	
Rubtsovsk airfield	Altai Krai		
Novosibirsk	Novosibirsk Oblast	590th Anti-Aircraft Missile Regiment: S-400; Pantsir-S1	
Tolmachevo helicopter base	Novosibirsk Oblast	Mi-28N Ka-52 Mi-8AMTSh Mi-8MTV-5	
Travyany air base	Sverdlovsk Oblast	Mi-24P Mi-8	
Shagol (Chelyabinsk) air base	Sverdlovsk Oblast	Su-34/Su-34NVO Su-24MR	
Uprun air base	Sverdlovsk Oblast	Mi-8	
Koltsovo air base	Sverdlovsk Oblast	An-12 An-26 An-148-100 Mi-8MT	
Beryozovsky	Sverdlovsk Oblast	185th Anti-Aircraft Missile Regiment: S-400	
Svobodny helicopter base	Sverdlovsk Oblast		
Yasny air base	Orenburg Oblast		
Orenburg-2 air base	Orenburg Oblast	Il-76MD Il-22PP An-12BK-PPS	
Bolshoye Savino air base	Perm Krai	MiG-31/MiG-31BM	
Danilovo air base	Mari El Republic		
Samara	Samara Oblast	568th Anti-Aircraft Regiment: S-400	
Troekurovka air base	Samara Oblast	Syzran Higher Military Aviation School	
Ulyanovsk Vostochny air base	Ulyanovsk Oblast	An-124 Il-76MD/Il-76MD-90A	
Mirny	Kirov Oblast	28th Anti-Aircraft Missile Brigade: S-300V4	
Bagay-Baranovka air base	Saratov Oblast	Various fixed-wing and helicopters	
Engels air base	Saratov Oblast	Tu-160/Tu-160M Tu-95MSM 511th Anti-Aircraft Missile Regiment: S-400; Pantsir-S	
Saratov-Sokol helicopter base	Saratov Oblast	Ansat-U Mi-8T Ka-226	
Rtishchevo air base	Saratov Oblast		
Balashov air base	Saratov Oblast		
Otvesnyi air base	Voronezh Oblast	Yak-130	
Buturlinovka air base	Voronezh Oblast		
Baltimor (Voronezh) air base	Voronezh Oblast	Su-34 Il-20M 108th Anti-Aircraft Missile Regiment: S-300PM2	
Tambov air base	Tambov Oblast	Tu-134UBL An-26	
Michurinsk air base	Tambov Oblast		
Lipetsk-2 air base	Lipetsk Oblast	Su-34 Su-35S	
Kursk-Vostochniy air base	Kursk Oblast	Su-30SM	
Seshcha air base	Bryansk Oblast	An-124	
Shaykovka air base	Kaluga Oblast	Tu-22M3	
Shatalovo air base	Smolensk Oblast	Su-24/Su-24MR An-30	
Dvoyevka air base	Smolensk Oblast	Mi-24P Ka-52 Mi-8MTV-5	
Dyagilevo air base	Ryazan Oblast	Tu-22M3 Tu-95MS Il-78/Il-78M	
Savasleika air base	Nizhny Novgorod Oblast	MiG-31K MiG-31BSM/MiG-31BM	
Semyazino air base	Vladimir Oblast		
Dobrynskoye helicopter base	Vladimir Oblast	Mi-28	
Severny air base	Ivanovo Oblast	A-50/A-50U Il-76MD	
Klin-5 air base	Moscow Oblast	Mi-8	
Dubrovki	Moscow Oblast	210th Anti-Aircraft Missile Regiment: S-400; Pantsir-S1	
Mar'ino	Moscow Oblast	584th Anti-Aircraft Missile Regiment: S-300PM	
Pestovo	Moscow Oblast	614th Anti-Aircraft Missile Regiment: S-300PM	
Fun'kovo	Moscow Oblast	93rd Anti-Aircraft Regiment: S-400; S-300PM; Pantsir-S1	
Il'inskoye	Moscow Oblast	549th Ant-Aircraft Missile Regiment: S-400; Pantsir-S1	
Chkalovskiy air base	Moscow Oblast	Il-76/Il-76MD An-72 An-140-100 An-12B Tu-154 Il-62M Mi-8/Mi-8AMTSh Il-80 Il-82 Tu-214PU-SBUS	
Elektrostal	Moscow Oblast	629th Anti-Aircraft Missile Regiment: S-300PM606th Anti-Aircraft Missile Regiment; S-400; S-300PM; Pantsir-S1	
Ramenskoye air base	Moscow Oblast	Gromov Flight Research Institute	
Ostafyevo air base	Moscow Oblast	Various fixed-wing transports	
Krasnoznamensk	Moscow Oblast	612th Anti-Aircraft Missile Regiment: S-300PM	
Kubinka air base	Moscow Oblast	Su-30SM Su-35S Il-20M	
Naro-Fominsk	Moscow Oblast	202nd Anti-Aircraft Missile Brigade: S-300V4	
Veretye air base	Pskov Oblast	Mi-28N Mi-24P Mi-35M Ka-52 Mi-8MT/MTV-2 Mi-26	
Pskov air base	Pskov Oblast	Il-76MD	
Vladimirsky Lager	Pskov Oblast	1544th Anti-Aircraft Missile Regiment: S-400; Pantsir-S	
Soltsy air base	Novgorod Oblast		
Izhitsy	Novgorod Oblast	42nd Anti-Aircraft Missile Regiment: S-400	
Gogland Island helicopter base	Leningrad Oblast		
Pribylovo helicopter base	Leningrad Oblast	Mi-24P Mi-28N Mi-35M Mi-8MT/MTV-2	
Gromovo air base	Leningrad Oblast		
Zelenogorsk	Leningrad Oblast	1488th Anti-Aircraft Missile Regiment: S-400	
Levashovo air base	Leningrad Oblast	An-26 An-12 An-148-100E Mi-8	
Vaganovo	Leningrad Oblast	1489th Anti-Aircraft Missile Regiment: S-400; Pantsir-S1	
Ulyanovka	Leningrad Oblast	1490th Anti-Aircraft Missile Regiment: S-400	
Pushkin helicopter base	Leningrad Oblast	Mi-8MT/MTV-2 Mi-8MTV-5	
Gostilitsy	Leningrad Oblast	500th Anti-Aircraft Missile Regiment: S-400; Pantsir-S1	
Millerovo air base	Rostov Oblast	Su-30SM MiG-29	
Morozovsk air base	Rostov Oblast	Su-34 Su-30 Su-35	
Marinovka air base	Volgograd Oblast	Su-30 Su-24M/Su-24MR	
Kotelnikovo air base	Volgograd Oblast	L-39C	
Akhtubinsk air base	Astrakhan Oblast	929th State Flight Test Centre (Russia's sole military state flight-test center): Su-57; S-70 Okhotnik-B; An-12BK/PPS; An-26KPA; An-72; An-124; Il-76MD; Su-27/27SM/SM3/UB/UP; MiG-29SMT/UBM; MiG-31BM; MiG-35; Su-24M; Su-25SM3; Su-30SM; Su-34; Su-35; T-50-2 PAK FA; Yak-130	
Ashuluk air base	Astrakhan Oblast	MiG-29	
Privolzhskiy air base	Astrakhan Oblast	MiG-29SMT	
Makhachkala airport	Dagestan	Su-30SM	
Khankala air base	Chechnya		
Budyonnovsk air base	Stavropol Krai	Su-25SM/Su-25SM3 Mi-35M Mi-28N Mi-8 MTV-5/Mi-8 AMTSh	
Mozdok air base	Republic of North Ossetia-Alania		
Khanskaya air base	Republic of Adygea	L-39C	
Armavir air base	Krasnodar Krai	Yak-130	
Sochi	Krasnodar Krai	1721st Anti-Aircraft Missile Regiment: S-350	
Sochi air base	Krasnodar Krai		
Novorossiysk	Krasnodar Krai	1537th Anti-Aircraft Missile Regiment: S-400; Pantsir-S1	
Krymsk air base	Krasnodar Krai	Su-30M2 Su-27SM3	
Korenovsk helicopter base	Krasnodar Krai	Mi-28N Mi-35M Ka-52 Mi-8AMTSh Mi-28UB 77th Anti-Aircraft Missile Brigade: S-300V4	
Tikhoretsk air base	Krasnodar Krai	L-39C	
Primorsko-Akhtarsk air base	Krasnodar Krai	Su-25SM/Su-25SM3	
Zernograd helicopter base	Krasnodar Krai	Mi-28N Mi-8AMTSh	
Kushchyovskaya air base	Krasnodar Krai	Yak-130	
Yeysk air base	Krasnodar Krai	Ka-27M Il-20M	
Tsentralny air base	Rostov Oblast	An-12 An-26 An-148-100E Mi-24P Mi-26 Il-20M	
Taganrog air base	Rostov Oblast	Il-76MD	
Kirovskoye air base	Occupied Crimea	Flight Test Centre (Maritime)	
Feodosia and Dzhankoi	Occupied Crimea	18th Anti-Aircraft Regiment: S-400; Pantsir-S1	
Dzhankoi helicopter base	Occupied Crimea	Mi-35M Mi-28N Ka-52 Mi-8AMTSh	
Gvardeyskoye air base	Occupied Crimea	Su-25SM Su-24M/Su-24MR	
Saki air base	Occupied Crimea	Su-30SM Su-24MR/Su-24M	
Kacha air base	Occupied Crimea	Ka-27 Ka-29 Ka-31R Be-12 An-26	
Belbek air base	Occupied Crimea	Su-30M2 Su-27SM	
Sevastopol and Yevpatoriya	Occupied Crimea	12th Anti-Aircraft Missile Regiment: S-400; Pantsir-S1	
Bombora air base	Occupied Georgia		
Primorskoe and Agudzera	Occupied Georgia	Anti-Aircraft Battalion: S-400; S-300PM	

== Russian Navy ==
=== Northern Fleet ===
Name	Location	Ships / Units	Citations
Severomorsk naval base	Murmansk Oblast	HQ, Northern Fleet Aircraft carrier, guided missile cruisers, destroyers, frigates, intelligence collection ship	
Olenya Guba naval base	Murmansk Oblast	536th Coastal Missile and Artillery Brigade: Bastion P; Bal	
Vidyayevo submarine base	Murmansk Oblast	Nuclear submarines	
Murmansk-150 (Zaozersk) submarine base	Murmansk Oblast	Nuclear submarines	
Gadzhiyevo submarine base	Murmansk Oblast	Nuclear submarines	
Polyarny naval base	Murmansk Oblast	Diesel submarines, corvettes, spy ships, minesweepers, landing ships	
Murmansk naval base	Murmansk Oblast	HQ, 14th Army Corps Support ships	
Mishukovo naval base	Murmansk Oblast	Spy ships	
Roslyakovo naval base	Murmansk Oblast	Support ships	
Zversovkhoz	Murmansk Oblast	420th Maritime Recon Point	
Gremikha naval base	Murmansk Oblast	160th SPDC PDSS	
Luostari, Pechenga and Korzunovo	Murmansk Oblast	200th Separate Motor Rifle Brigade	
Sputnik	Murmansk Oblast	61st Naval Infantry Brigade	
Alakurtti	Murmansk Oblast	80th Arctic Motor Rifle Brigade	
Severodvinsk naval base	Arkhangelsk Oblast	Corvettes, special purpose ships, minesweepers, transport ship, submarine, support ships	
Alexandra Land, Franz Josef Land	Arkhangelsk Oblast	Coastal Missile Battery: Bastion P; Bal; 80th Arctic Motor Rifle Brigade	
Kotelny Island	Sakha Republic	Coastal Missile Battery: Bastion P	

=== Black Sea Fleet ===
Name	Location	Ships / Units	Citations
Sevastopol naval base	Occupied Crimea	HQ, Black Sea Fleet 810th Naval Infantry Brigade 388th Maritime Recon Point 854th Separate Coastal Missile Regiment: Rubezh; 15th Coastal Missile Brigade: Bastion P; Bal; Utyos; 102nd SPDC PDSS	
Novorossiysk naval base	Krasnodar Krai	Diesel submarines, frigates, corvettes, patrol ships, minesweepers, intelligence collection ships, amphibious transport docks, landing ships, cargo ships, support ships 136th SPDC PDSS	
Feodosia naval base	Occupied Crimea	Support ships	
Temryuk naval base	Krasnodar Krai	Support ships	
Utash	Krasnodar Krai	11th Coastal Missile Brigade: Bastion P; Bal; Bereg	

=== Pacific Fleet ===
Name	Location	Ships / Units	Citations
Fokino naval base	Primorsky Krai	HQ, Pacific Fleet Guided missile cruiser, destroyers, landing ships and craft, anti-sabotage boats 159th SPDC PDSS	
Petropavlovsk-Kamchatsky naval base	Kamchatka Krai	Nuclear submarines, corvettes, special purpose ship, missile tracking ship, minesweepers, support ships, anti-sabotage boats 40th Naval Infantry Brigade 311th SPDC PDSS 101st SPDC PDSS	
Rybachiy submarine base	Kamchatka Krai	Nuclear submarines	
Anglichanka	Kamchatka Krai	520th Coastal Missile Brigade: Bal; Bastion P	
Matua Island	Sakhalin Oblast	Coastal Missile Battalion: Bastion P	
Iturup/Etorofu Island	Sakhalin Oblast	Coastal Missile Battalion: Bastion P	
Kunashir Island	Sakhalin Oblast	Coastal Missile Battalion: Bal	
Vladivostok naval base	Primorsky Krai	155th Guards Naval Infantry Brigade Diesel submarines, corvettes, intelligence collection ships, minesweepers, support ships	
Russky Island	Primorsky Krai	42nd Maritime Recon Point	
Nikolayevsk naval base	Khabarovsk Krai	Support ships	
Smolyaninovo	Primorsky Krai	72nd Coastal Missile Brigade: Bastion P; Bal	
Korsakov naval base	Sakhalin Oblast	Support ships	
Sakhalin Island and Kuril Islands	Sakhalin Oblast	75th Coastal Missile Brigade: Bastion P; Bal	
Sovetskaya Gavan naval base	Khabarovsk Krai	Corvettes, minesweepers, support ships	

=== Baltic Fleet ===
Name	Location	Ships / Units	Citations
Kaliningrad	Kaliningrad Oblast	HQ, Baltic Fleet	
Kaliningrad	Kaliningrad Oblast	244th Artillery Brigade 7th Guards Motorized Rifle Regiment	
Baltiysk naval base	Kaliningrad Oblast	336th Naval Infantry Brigade	
Parusnoye	Kaliningrad Oblast	561st Maritime Recon Point	
Donskoye	Kaliningrad Oblast	27th Coastal Missile Brigade: Bastion P; Bal	
Gusev	Kaliningrad Oblast	HQ, 11th Army Corps	
Kronshtadt naval base	Leningrad Oblast	Diesel submarines, corvettes, minesweepers, support ships, anti-sabotage boats Coastal Missile Unit: Bastion-P; Bal; 473rd SPDC PDSS	
Lomonosov naval base	Leningrad Oblast	Intelligence collection ship, support ships	

=== Caspian Flotilla ===
Name	Location	Ships / Units	Citations
Kaspiysk naval base	Dagestan	HQ, Caspian Flotilla 177th Separate Guards Naval Infantry Regiment 51st Separate Coastal Missile Battalion: Bal; Frigates, gunboats, corvettes, minesweepers, landing craft	
Trudfront naval base	Astrakhan Oblast	Landing craft, support ships	
Astrakhan naval base	Astrakhan Oblast		
Makhachkala naval base	Dagestan	137th SPDC PDSS Anti-sabotage boats	

== GRAU Arsenals ==
Name	Location	Units	Citations
Alatyr	Chuvash Republic	5th Arsenal Main Missile and Artillery Directorate	
Kotovo	Novgorod Oblast	13th Arsenal Main Missile and Artillery Directorate	
Oktyabrsky	Tver Oblast	23rd Arsenal Main Missile and Artillery Directorate	
Kirzhach	Vladimir Oblast	51st Arsenal Main Missile and Artillery Directorate	
Dzerzhinsk	Nizhniy Novogorod Oblast	53rd Arsenal Main Missile and Artillery Directorate	
Sklad-40	Tver Oblast	55th Arsenal Main Missile and Artillery Directorate	
Kaluga	Kaluga Oblast	60th Arsenal Main Missile and Artillery Directorate	
Lipetsk	Lipetsk Oblast	63rd Arsenal Main Missile and Artillery Directorate	
Karachev	Bryansk Oblast	67th Arsenal Main Missile and Artillery Directorate	
Mozdok	North Ossetia	68th Arsenal Main Missile and Artillery Directorate	
Ivanovo	Vladimir Oblast	73rd Arsenal Main Missile and Artillery Directorate	
Serpukhov	Moscow Oblast	75th Arsenal Main Missile and Artillery Directorate	
Gagarskiy	Sverdlovsk Oblast	80th Arsenal Main Missile and Artillery Directorate	
Skopin	Ryazan Oblast	97th Arsenal Main Missile and Artillery Directorate	
Urman	Bashkortostan	99th Arsenal Main Missile and Artillery Directorate	
Saransk	Mordovia	103rd Arsenal Main Missile and Artillery Directorate	
Toropets	Tver Oblast	107th Arsenal Main Missile and Artillery Directorate	
