= List of military airbases in Russia =

Location of military airbases in Russia, western most half, and occupied Crimea
Location of military airbases in Russia, eastern most half

This is a List of military airbases in Russia, including the airbases used by the Russian Aerospace Forces, Russian Naval Aviation, National Guard of Russia and aircraft repair depots. The list includes overseas Russian airbases including those in Russian occupied Crimea.

It can be compared with the List of Soviet Air Force bases.

The main air armies are the:

- 4th Air and Air Defence Forces Army which is part of the Southern Military District
- 6th Air and Air Defence Forces Army which is part of the Western Military District
- 11th Air and Air Defence Forces Army which is part of the Eastern Military District
- 14th Air and Air Defence Forces Army which is part of the Central Military District
- 45th Air and Air Defence Forces Army part of the Northern Fleet Joint Strategic Command

Units can also be direct reporting and report to the Russian Aerospace Forces HQ, including Long Range Aviation and Military Transport Aviation.

Name	Location	Krai/Oblast	Air Army /Command	Higher Unit	Unit	Notes
Achinsk Airport	Achinsk	Krasnoyarsk Krai		21st Composite Aviation Division	712th Guards Fighter Aviation Regiment	diversionary airfield
Akhtubinsk	Akhtubinsk	Astrakhan Oblast	VVS HQ	929th State Flight Test Centre named for V. P. Chkalov	N/A	
Armavir	Armavir	Krasnodar Krai	VVS HQ	783rd Training Center	713th Training Aviation Regiment	
Astrakhan/Ashchuluk	Astrakhan	Astrakhan Oblast	VVS HQ	185th Centre for Combat Application and Combat Training for the Air Force	116th Centre for Combat Employment of Air Defence Aviation	
Bagay-Baranovka	Sennoy	Saratov Oblast	VVS HQ	929th State Flight Test Centre named for V. P. Chkalov	395th Independent Test Aviation Squadron	
Balashov	Balashov	Saratov Oblast		785th Aviation Training Center for Long-Range and Military Transport Aviation	606th Training Aviation Regiment	
Belaya/Irkutsk	Usolye-Sibirskoye	Irkutsk Oblast	Long-Range	326th Heavy Bomber Aviation Division	181st Independent Composite Aviation Squadron; 200th Guards Heavy Bomber Aviation Regiment; 444th Heavy Bomber Aviation Regiment	
Belbek Air Base	Fruktove	Crimea	4th	27th Mixed Aviation Division	38th Fighter Regiment	
Borisoglebsk	Borisoglebsk	Voronezh Oblast	VVS HQ	786th Aviation Training Centre for the Training of Flight Personnel	160th Training Aviation Regiment	
Borisovsky Khotilovo	Bologoye	Tver Oblast	6th	105th Guards Composite Aviation Division	790th Fighter Aviation Regiment	
Bratsk	Bratsk	Irkutsk Oblast	14th	32nd Independent Composite Transport Aviation Regiment	Aviation Search and Rescue Detachment	
Budyonnovsk/Budennovsk	Budyonnovsk	Stavropol Krai	4th	1st Guards Composite Aviation Division N/A	368th Assault Aviation Regiment 487th Independent Combat Control Helicopter Regiment	
Burevestnik	Burevestnik	Sakhalin Oblast	11th	18th Army Aviation Brigade	Detachment	
Chelyabinsk/Shagol	Chelyabinsk	Chelyabinsk Oblast	VVS HQ 14th	Prof. N.E. Zhukovsky and Iu.A. Gagarin Air Force Academy 21st Composite Aviation Division	108th Training Aviation Regiment 2nd Guards Composite Aviation Regiment	
Chernigovka	Chernigovka	Primorsky Krai	11th	303rd Composite Aviation Division N/A	18th Guards Assault Aviation Regiment 319th Independent Helicopter Regiment	
Chita Northwest/Chita-2	Chita	Zabaykalsky Krai		N/A	112th Independent Helicopter Regiment	
Chkalovsky	Shchyolkovo	Moscow Oblast	VVS HQ	929th State Flight Test Centre named for V. P. Chkalov 8th Aviation Special Purpose Division	3rd Aviation Squadron 353rd Special Purpose Aviation Regiment; 354th Special Purpose Aviation Regiment; 206th Special Purpose Aviation Base	
Dolinsk-Sokol	Dolinsk	Sakhalin Oblast	11th	303rd Composite Aviation Division	Aviation Command	
Domna	Chita	Zabaykalsky Krai	4th	N/A	120th Composite Aviation Regiment	
Dyagilevo/Ryazan	Ryazan	Ryazan Oblast	Long-Range	N/A 43rd Guards Center for Combat Employment and Retraining of Long-Range Aviation Flight Personnel	203rd Guards Orlovsky Independent Aircraft-refuelling Aviation Regiment 49th Instructor Heavy Bomber Aviation Regiment	
Dzhankoi	Dzhankoi	Crimea		27th Composite Aviation Division	39th Helicopter Regiment	
Dzyomgi/Komsomolsk-on-Amur	Komsomolsk-na-Amure	Khabarovsk Krai		303rd Composite Aviation Division	23rd Fighter Aviation Regiment	
Elizovo	Petropavlovsk-Kamchatsky	Kamchatka Krai	Kamchatka Flotilla	7060th Naval Aviation Air Base	175th Independent Shipborne Anti-submarine Helicopter Squadron; 317th Independent Composite Antisubmarine Aviation Regiment; Independent Unmanned Aerial vehicle Squadron; 865th Fighter Aviation Regiment	
Engels-2	Engels	Saratov Oblast	Long-Range	22nd Guards Heavy Bomber Aviation Division	121st Guards Heavy Bomber Aviation Regiment; 184th Heavy Bomber Aviation Regiment	
Gromovo	Gromovo	Leningrad Oblast	6th	N/A	33rd Independent Transport Composite Aviation Regiment	
Gvardeyskoye	Hvardiiske	Crimea	4th	27th Composite Aviation Division	37th Guards Composite Aviation Regiment	
Ivanovo Severny	Ivanovo	Ivanovo Oblast	Military Transport VVS HQ	12th Military Transport Aviation Division 4th Centre for Combat Employment and Retraining of Personnel	144th Airborne Early Warning Aviation Regiment N/A	
Kamensk-Uralsky/Traviany	Kamensk-Uralsky	Sverdlovsk Oblast	14th	17th Guards Army Aviation Brigade	N/A	
Kansk	Kansk	Krasnoyarsk Krai		21st Composite Aviation Division	712th Guards Fighter Aviation Regiment	
Kant	Kant	Chüy Region		999th Air Base	N/A	
Kapustin Yar	Znamensk	Astrakhan Oblast	Strategic Rocket Forces	N/A	35th Independent Mixed Air Squadron	
Khabarovsk Tsentralny/Bolshoy	Khabarovsk	Khabarovsk Krai	11th	18th Army Aviation Brigade N/A N/A N/A	N/A 35th Independent Transport Composite Aviation Regiment 1st Independent Composite Aviation Squadron Far East Aviation Service Center	
Khanskaya/Maykop	Maykop	Adygea	VVS HQ	783rd Aviation Training Centre for the Training of Flight Personnel	761st Training Aviation Regiment	
Khrabrovo	Kaliningrad			132nd Composite Aviation Division Special Purpose Aviation Detachment Kaliningrad	398th Independent Air Transport Squadron N/A	
Kirovske	Kirovske	Crimea	VVS HQ	929th State Flight Test Centre named for V. P. Chkalov	N/A	
Klin	Klin	Moscow Oblast		344th Centre for Combat use and Retraining of Flight Personnel of Army Aviation	92nd Instructor and Research Helicopter Squadron	
Klokovo	Tula	Tula Oblast		N/A	490th Independent Helicopter Regiment	
Klyuchi	Klyuchi	Kamchatka Krai	11th	35th Independent Transport Composite Aviation Regiment	Composite Aviation Squadron	
Koltsovo	Yekaterinburg	Sverdlovsk Oblast	14th	N/A	32nd Independent Composite Transport Aviation Regiment	
Komsomolsk-on-Amur/Khurba	Komsomolsk-na-Amure	Khabarovsk Krai		303rd Composite Aviation Division	277th Bomber Aviation Regiment	
Korenovsk	Korenovsk	Krasnodar Krai	4th	N/A	55th Independent Helicopter Regiment	
Kotelnikovo	Kotelnikovo	Volgograd Oblast			704th Training Aviation Regiment	
Krymsk	Krymsk	Krasnodar Krai	4th	1st Guards Composite Aviation Division	3rd Composite Guards Aviation Regiment	
Kubinka	Kubinka	Moscow Oblast	VVS HQ	4th Centre for Combat Employment and Retraining of Personnel	237th Air Force Display Centre of the Russian Air Force. I. N. Kozheduba	
Kursk Vostochny	Kursk	Kursk Oblast	6th	105th Guards Composite Aviation Division	14th Guards Fighter Aviation Regiment	
Kushchyovskaya	Kushchyovskaya	Krasnodar Krai	VVS HQ	Krasnodar Higher Military Aviation School of Pilots	797th Training Aviation Regiment	
Kyzyl	Kyzyl	Tyva Republic	14th	N/A	32nd Independent Composite Transport Aviation Regiment, Composite Aviation Squadron	
Levashovo	Levashovo	Saint Petersburg	6th	N/A	33rd Independent Composite Aviation Regiment	
Lipetsk	Lipetsk	Lipetsk Oblast	VVS HQ	4th Centre for Combat Employment and Retraining of Personnel	237th Air Force Display Centre of the Russian Air Force. I. N. Kozheduba - Russian Falcons; 968th Instructor-Research Aviation Regiment	
Marinovka	Marinovka	Volgograd Oblast	4th	4th Composite Aviation Division	11th Composite Aviation Regiment	
Michurinsk	Michurinsk	Tambov Oblast	VVS HQ	786th Aviation Training Centre for the Training of Flight Personnel	644th Training Aviation Regiment	
Migalovo/Tver	Tver	Tver Oblast	Military Transport VVS HQ	12th Military Transport Aviation Division N/A	8th Military Transport Aviation Regiment 2nd Central Scientific Research Institute	
Millerovo	Millerovo	Rostov Oblast	4th	N/A	31st Guards Fighter Aviation Regiment	
Mirny	Mirny	Sakha		N/A	17th Independent Transport Aviation Squadron	
Monchegorsk	Monchegorsk	Murmansk Oblast	6th	N/A	98th Guards Composite Aviation Regiment	
Morozovsk	Morozovsk	Rostov Oblast	4th	1st Guards Composite Aviation Division	559th Bomber Aviation Regiment	
Nalchik	Nalchik	Kabardino-Balkaria		929th State Flight Test Centre named for V. P. Chkalov	Nalchik Mountain range Test Centre	
Olenya; Olenegorsk/Vysokiy	Olenegorsk	Murmansk Oblast	Long-Range	22nd Guards Heavy Bomber Aviation Division	40th Composite Aviation Regiment	
Orenburg-2	Orenburg	Orenburg Oblast	Military Transport	18th Guards Military Transport Aviation Division	117th Military Transport Aviation Regiment	
Ostrov	Ostrov	Pskov Oblast	6th	15th Army Aviation Brigade	N/A	
Perm/Bolshoye Savino	Perm	Perm Krai	14th	21st Composite Aviation Division	764th Fighter Aviation Regiment	
Petrozavodsk/Besovets	Besovets	Republic of Karelia	6th	105th Guards Composite Aviation Division	159th Guards Fighter Aviation Regiment	
Pribylovo/Kluchevoye	Pribylovo	Leningrad Oblast	6th	N/A	549th Independent Helicopter Regiment	
Primorsko-Akhtarsk	Primorsko-Akhtarsk	Krasnodar Krai	4th	4th Composite Aviation Division	960th Assault Aviation Regiment	
Pskov airbase	Pskov	Pskov Oblast	Military Transport	12th Military Transport Aircraft Division	334th Military Transport Aviation Regiment	
Pugachyov	Pugachyov	Saratov Oblast	VVS HQ	Zhukovsky – Gagarin Air Force Academy	626th Training Helicopter Regiment	
Pushkin-3	Pushkin	Saint Petersburg	6th	N/A	332nd Guards Independent Helicopter Regiment	
Rostov-on-Don North	Rostov-on-Don	Rostov Oblast	4th	N/A	30th Independent Composite Transport Aviation Regiment	
Rtishchevo	Rtishchevo	Saratov Oblast	VVS HQ	786th Aviation Training Centre for the Training of Flight Personnel	666th Training Aviation Regiment	
Saky	Saky	Crimea	Black Sea Fleet	N/A	43rd Independent Naval Assault Aviation Regiment	
Saratov West/Sokol	Saratov	Saratov Oblast	VVS HQ	Zhukovsky – Gagarin Air Force Academy	131st Training Helicopter Regiment	
Savasleyka	Vyksa	Nizhny Novgorod Oblast	VVS HQ	4th Centre for Combat Employment and Retraining of Personnel	3958th Aviation Base	
Semyazino	Vladimir	Vladimir Oblast	6th	N/A	33rd Independent Transport Composite Aviation Regiment	
Seshcha	Dubrovka	Bryansk Oblast	Military Transport	12th Military Transport Aviation Division	566th Military Transport Aviation Regiment	
Severomorsk-1	Severomorsk	Murmansk Oblast	Naval Aviation	N/A	403rd Independent Composite Aviation Regiment	
Severomorsk-3	Murmansk	Murmansk Oblast	Naval Aviation	N/A	100th Independent Shipborne Fighter Aviation Regiment	
Shatalovo	Pochinok	Smolensk Oblast	6th	N/A 105th Guards Composite Aviation Division	164th Reconnaissance Aviation Squadron 4th Independent Reconnaissance Aviation Squadron	
Shaykovka	Kirov	Kaluga Oblast	Long-Range	22nd Guards Heavy Bomber Aviation Division	52nd Heavy Bomber Regiment	
Soltsy-2	Soltsy	Novgorod Oblast	Long-Range	22nd Guards Heavy Bomber Aviation Division	40th Composite Aviation Regiment	
Step	Chita	Zabaykalsky Krai	11th	N/A	266th Independent Aviation Regiment	
Syzran	Syzran	Samara Oblast		Prof. N.E. Zhukovsky and Iu.A. Gagarin Air Force Academy	484th Training Helicopter Regiment	
Taganrog-Central; Tsentralnyy	Taganrog	Rostov Oblast	Military Transport	18th Guards Military Transport Aviation Division	708th Military Transport Aviation Regiment	
Tambov/Vostochniy	Tambov	Tambov Oblast	Long-Range	43rd Guards Center for Combat Employment and Retraining of Long-Range Aviation Flight Personnel	27th Composite Aviation Regiment	
Temp	Kotelny Island	Sakha		326th Heavy Bomber Aviation Division	Aviation Command, 182nd Guards Heavy Bomber Aviation Regiment	
Tikhoretsk	Tikhoretsk	Krasnodar Krai		Krasnodar Higher Military Aviation School of Pilots	627th Training Aviation Regiment	
Tiksi	Tiksi	Sakha	Long-Range	326th Heavy Bomber Aviation Division	Aviation Command, 200th Guards Heavy Bomber Aviation Regiment	
Tolmachevo/Novosibirsk	Ob	Novosibirsk Oblast	14th	N/A	337th Independent Helicopter Regiment; Composite Aviation Squadron, 32nd Independent Composite Transport Aviation Regiment	
Torzhok	Torzhok	Tver Oblast		344th Centre for Combat use and Retraining of Flight Personnel of Army Aviation	696th Instructor Test Helicopter Regiment; Aerobatic Team - Eagles	
Uglovoye/Tsentralnaya	Artyom	Primorsky Krai	11th	303rd Composite Aviation Division	22nd Guards Fighter Aviation Regiment	
Ukrainka/Seryshevo	Belogorsk	Amur Oblast	Long-Range	326th Heavy Bomber Aviation Division	79th Heavy Bomber Aviation Regiment; 182nd Guards Heavy Bomber Aviation Regiment	
Uprun/Troitsk	Troitsk	Chelyabinsk Oblast	14th	17th Guards Army Aviation Brigade	Aviation Group, 17th Guards Brigade of Army Aviation	
Varfolomeyevka	Arsenyev	Primorsky Krai		N/A	799th Independent Reconnaissance Aviation Squadron	
Voronezh Malshevo	Voronezh	Voronezh Oblast	6th	N/A	47th Composite Guards Aviation Regiment	
Vozdvizhenka/Ussuriysk	Ussuriysk	Primorsky Krai	11th	303rd Composite Aviation Division		
Vyazma	Vyazma	Smolensk Oblast	6th	N/A	440th Independent Helicopter Regiment	
Yeysk	Yeysk	Krasnodar Krai		859th Centre for Combat Application and Crew Training for Naval Aviation	N/A	
Zernograd	Zernograd	Rostov Oblast	4th	16th Army Aviation Brigade	N/A	

== See also ==
- List of Russian military bases
- List of Russian military bases abroad
- List of Soviet Air Force bases
