= 4th Centre for Combat Employment and Retraining of Personnel =

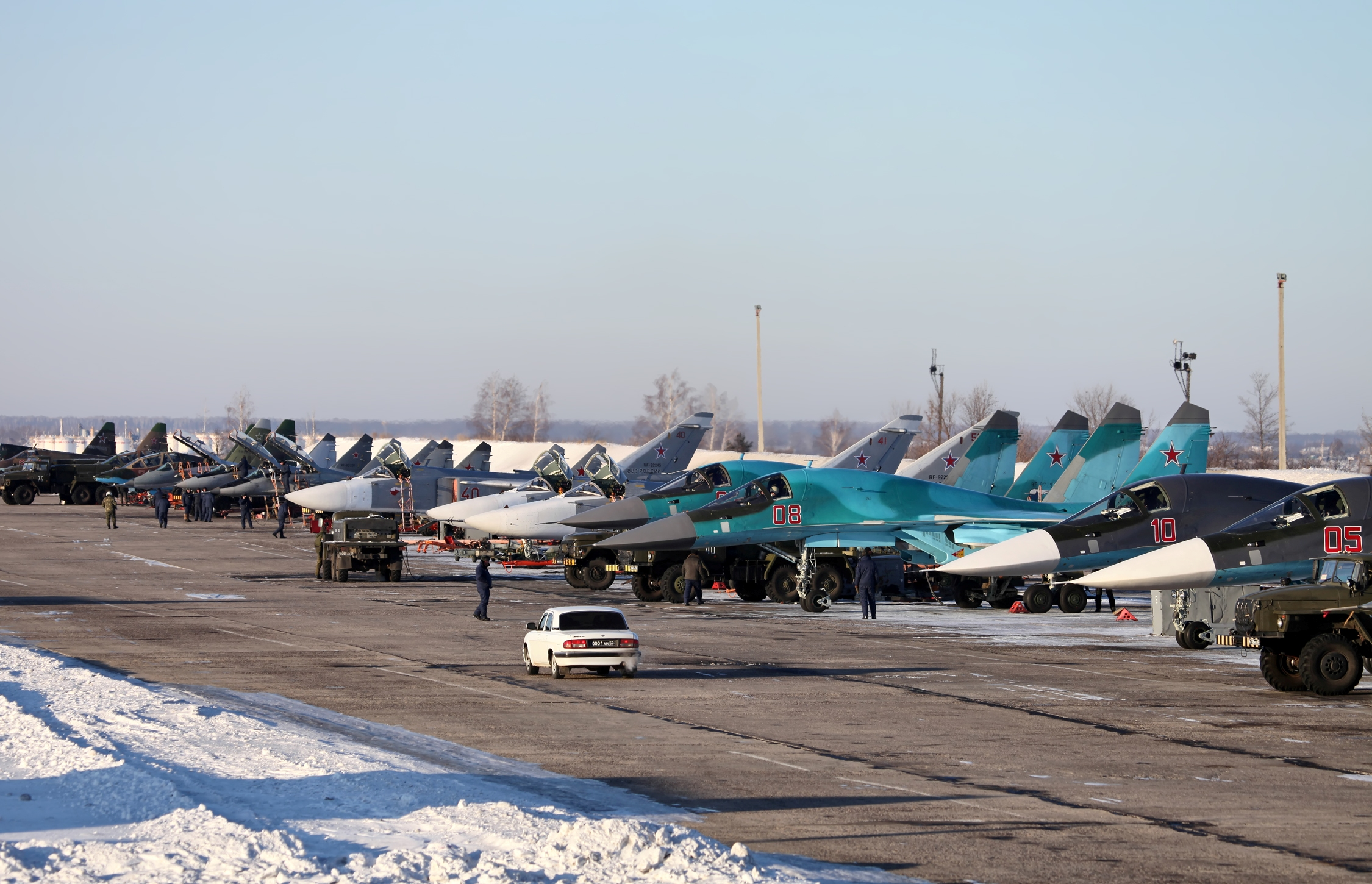
- Su-25SM and MiG-29UB, Su-24M2 and Su-34. 2012
- Country: Russia
- Branch: Russian Aerospace Forces

Commanders
- Current commander: Lieutenant General Yu.A Sushkov

Insignia
- Identification symbol

The 4th Centre for Combat Employment and Retraining of Personnel VVS of the Russian Aerospace Forces is a research, training, and instructional centre. It was formed at Tambov (air base) on 19 April 1953. In 1954 it was transferred to Voronezh Malshevo (air base) and 1960 to the Lipetsk air base, and then was transformed into the 4th Centre deployment and retraining flight personnel of the Air Force. It was part of the Air Forces of the Moscow Military District for decades.

During the Soviet era the training department of the centre taught over 45,000 officers of various military specialities. Eleven Soviet cosmonauts retrained on new types of aircraft at the base. As a symbol of the history of aviation in Lipetsk, in August 1969 an Aviators' Square was erected with a monument of an upward-pointed Mikoyan-Gurevich MiG-19 aircraft.

From 1960 to 1990 the centre directed three research-instructor aviation regiments, the 91st, 455th, and 760th. The 91st and 760th were at Lipetsk while the 455th was at Voronezh Malshevo (air base). The 91st and 760th were disbanded in 1992 and the 455th Research-Instructor Mixed Aviation Regiment was renamed the 455th Bomber Aviation Regiment and resubordinated to the 105th Mixed Aviation Division. In their place the 968th Fighter Aviation Regiment returned from Falkenberg in East Germany in 1992 and was converted in 1993 into a Research-Instructor Fighter Aviation Regiment, later a Research-Instructor Mixed Aviation Regiment.

After the collapse of the Soviet Union the military-industrial complex deteriorated, and the budget of the armed forces was significantly reduced. It was a difficult time for the Lipetsk Air Base. The 54th Guards Fighter Aviation Regiment was assigned to the centre from 2001 to 2002. A change for the better only began in 2003: the available fuel increased, and the material base began to be strengthened.

In July 2003, on the 300th anniversary of Lipetsk, a ninety-minute airshow was held. This event began with a visiting delegation of French military pilots, headed by General Jean Romuald Robert. The group arrived with two Lockheed C-130 Hercules military transport planes, Dassault Mirage F1CTs, and three Dassault Mirage 2000 fighter/attack aircraft.

On 22 April 2004 the Russian president Vladimir Putin and Prime Minister Italian Silvio Berlusconi visited the centre, arriving in Lipetsk on opening the Italian company Ariston. There was a demonstration of aviation technology in action, including complex aerobatics, with the personal participation of the chief of the centre Alexander Kharchevsky.

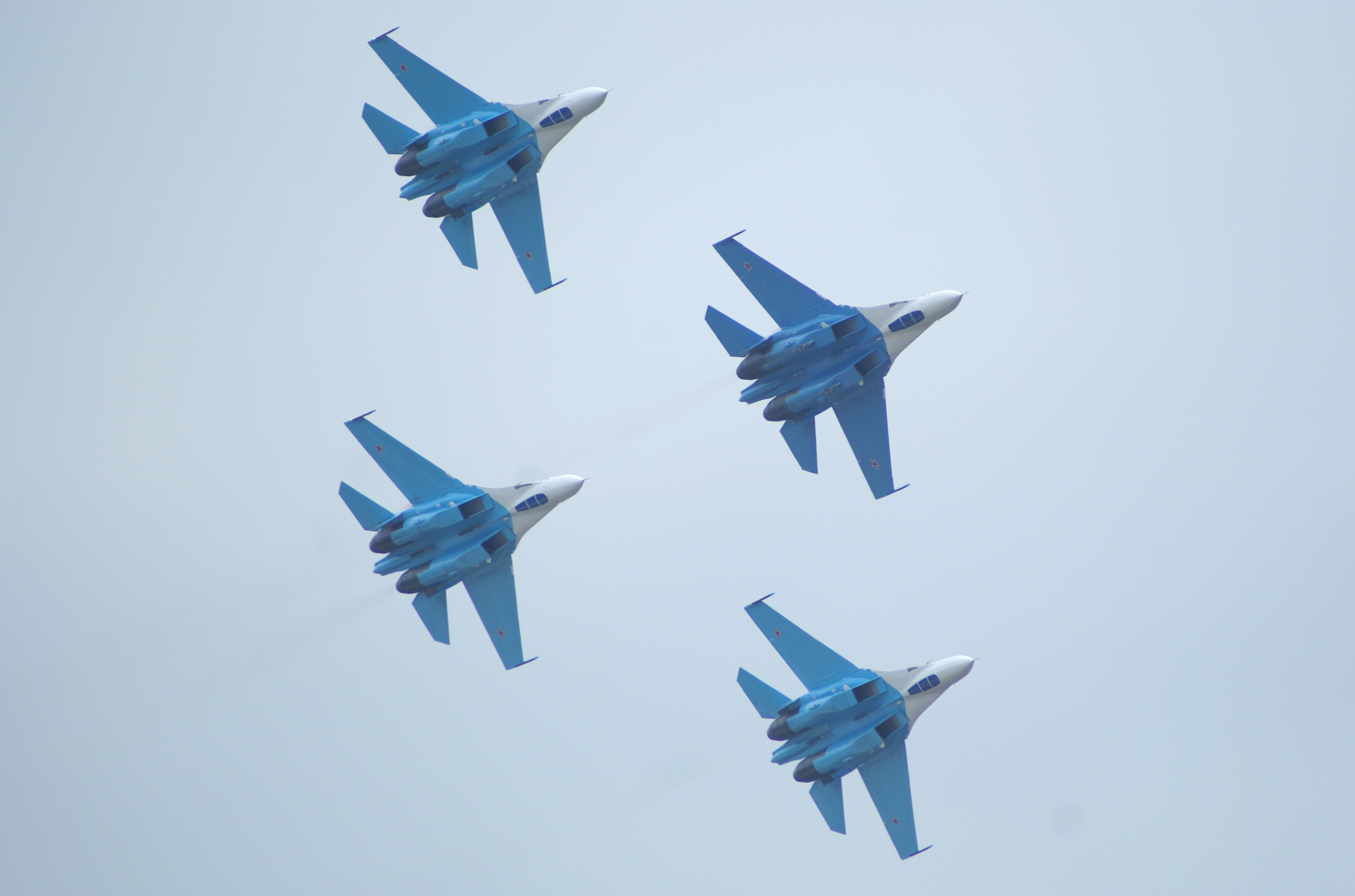
centre of Lipetsk combat employment and retraining flight crews, flight group "Russian Falcons" in MAKS-2009.

On 5 September 2006 a delegation from 32 OSCE member states visited the air base for the first time.

On 3 August 2007 the newest Russian fighter-bomber, the Sukhoi Su-34 from Novosibirsk Aviation Industrial Association flew at the test airfield. Under the control of pilots Sergei Shcherbina and Alexander Aschenkova the plane arrived in Lipetsk Air Base, where it was solemnly adopted and made atonement for the Air Force.

Sukhoi Su-24 and Su-34 bombers from Lipetsk PPI and PLC participated in the 2008 Moscow Victory Day Parade. The Su-34 was piloted by the chief of the aviation centre, Major General Alexander Kharchevsky.

19 June 2008 marked the 55th anniversary of the founding of Lipetsk Air Base.

In 2011, the military prosecutor's office of the Western Military District opened a criminal investigation into the extortion of money from Lipetsk Air Base airmen. According to "Interfax", the reason for this was the information contained in the Internet address of lieutenant Igor Sulim, which found its confirmation in the audit. Defendants in the case, initiated on the 286th article Criminal Code of Russia ("exceeding official authority") began with the commander of the military unit, Colonel Edward Kowalski, and his deputy for educational work, Colonel Sergei Sidorenko. After a three-year trial, they were convicted and sentenced to deprivation of liberty for a term of four and five years probation and ordered to pay compensation to the victims.

In 2013, aviation centre staff began development of Sukhoi Su-30 super-maneuverable multi-role fighters; fighter development began in 2014 for Sukhoi Su-35s.

In 2014, the aviation centre airfield was used as the base airfield at the time of the flight crews of the Air Force and Navy aviation competition "Aviadarts".

In August 2015 the chief of the aviation centre, Major-General Alexander Kharchevsky resigned; he was replaced by Hero of the Russian Federation Major General Sergey Kobylash until September 2016. The current chief aviation center is Lieutenant General Yu. A Sushkov.
