= Korenovsky =

Korenovsky (masculine), Korenovskaya (feminine), or Korenovskoye (neuter) may refer to:

- Korenovsky District, a district of Krasnodar Krai, Russia
- Korenovskoye Urban Settlement, a municipal formation which the Town of Korenovsk in Korenovsky District of Krasnodar Krai is incorporated as
- Korenovskoye, name of the town of Korenovsk in Krasnodar Krai until the end of the 19th century
- Korenovskaya, name of the town of Korenovsk in Krasnodar Krai until 1961
