= Savasleyka =

Savasleyka may refer to:

- Savasleyka (air base), an air base in Nizhny Novgorod Oblast, Russia
- Savasleyka (rural locality), a rural locality (a selo) in Nizhny Novgorod Oblast, Russia
