= Semyazino Airport =

Airport in Russia

Semyazino Airport Vladimir/Semyazino
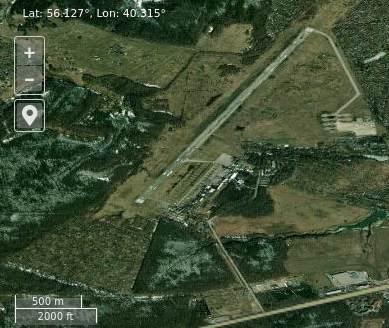
- Satellite imagery of Semyazino airport
- IATA: none; ICAO: none

Summary
- Airport type: Public/Military
- Operator: Vladimir FSUE "Avialesookhrana"; Russian Aerospace Forces
- Location: Vladimir, Vladimir Oblast
- Elevation AMSL: 554 ft / 169 m
- Coordinates: 56°7′36″N 40°18′54″E
- Interactive map of Semyazino Airport; Vladimir/Semyazino

Runways
Direction	Length		Surface
Direction	ft	m	Surface
02/20	6,398	1,950	Asphalt

Semyazino Airport (Russian: Аэропорт Семязино) is an airport in Russia located 6 km west of Vladimir. It is an Aerial Forest Protection Service base. Reportedly also VVS Antonov An-26s are based here.

The base is home to the 33rd Independent Transport Composite Aviation Regiment which is part of the 6th Air and Air Defence Forces Army.

== Airlines and destinations ==
Airlines	Destinations
Komiaviatrans	St. Petersburg

== See also ==
- List of airports in Russia
- List of military airbases in Russia
