= Borisoglebsk air base =

Russian airbase

Borisoglebsk
- Borisoglebsk, Voronezh Oblast in Russia
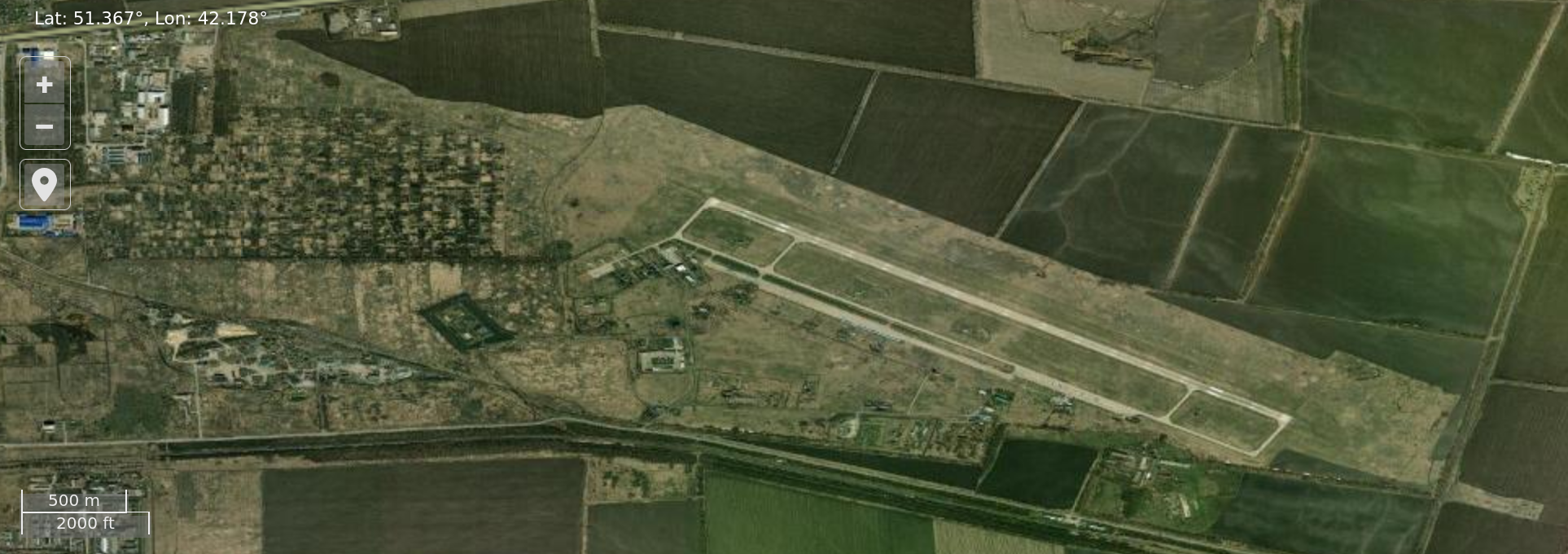
- Satellite imagery of Borisoglebsk air base

Site information
- Type: Air Base
- Owner: Ministry of Defence
- Operator: Russian Aerospace Forces

Location
- Shown within Voronezh Oblast Borisoglebsk (Russia)
- Coordinates: 51°22′0″N 42°10′42″E

Site history
- In use: -present

Airfield information
- Elevation: 115 metres (377 ft) AMSL
Runways
Direction	Length and surface
11/29	2,500 metres (8,202 ft) Concrete

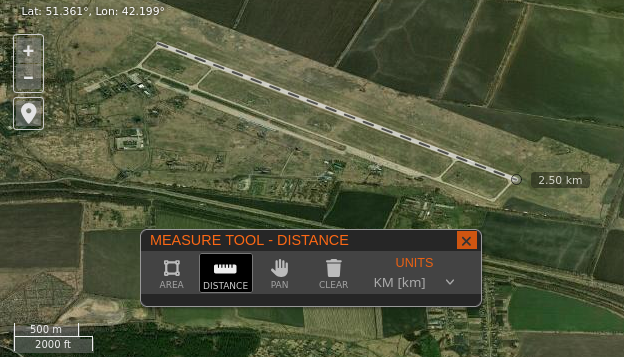
NASA's FIRMS shows runway 11/29 to be 2.50 km

Borisoglebsk (also Borisoglebsk East) is an air base located 6 km east of Borisoglebsk in Voronezh Oblast, Russia. It is a small military airfield.

As of 2022, the base was home to 160th Training Aviation Regiment which flies the Sukhoi Su-25 and Yakovlev Yak-130 of the 786th Aviation Training Centre for the Training of Flight Personnel.

Google Earth high-resolution satellite imagery accessed in 2006 showed numerous Aero L-39 'Albatross' trainer aircraft, Su-25 'Frogfoot' and two Su-24 'Fencer' aircraft.

== History ==
Military flight training has taken place at the base since the 1920s. From 1960 to 1971 the 478th Training Aviation Regiment, initially flying Ilyushin Il-12s and Il-14s, was stationed at the airfield. It moved in 1971 to Petrovsk in Saratov Oblast.

In October 1990 the 1080th Red Banner Aviation Centre for Retraining of Personnel named for V.P. Chkalov (1080 UATsPLS, ru:Борисоглебское высшее военное авиационное училище лётчиков им. В. П. Чкалова) was activated at Borisoglebsk. It was an amalgamation of the 796th Center for Preparation of Officers for Fighter and Fighter-Bomber Aviation, and the Borisoglebsk Higher Military Aviation School of Pilots. The Centre was subordinated to the Air Forces of the Moscow Military District.

The 1080 UATsPLS had the following components in 1990:

- 160th Instructor Fighter Aviation Regiment (Borisoglebsk, Voronezh Oblast) with MiG-29 and MiG-21. In 1991 the 160 IIAP was equipped with 60 MiG-21 aircraft. In addition, the regiment had 25 MiG-29E in the early 1990s through at least 2003.
- 186th Instructor Assault Aviation Regiment (Buturlinovka, Voronezh Oblast) with Su-25
- 281st Instructor Fighter Aviation Regiment (Totskoye, Orenburg Oblast) with MiG-23
- 343rd Instructor Fighter Aviation Regiment (Sennoy, Saratov Oblast) with MiG-29

Holm's information reports that the 1080 UATsPLS was disbanded in 1997 and the awards (presumably the Order of the Red Banner and the title 'in the name of V.P. Chkalov') were transferred to the 4th Center for Combat Employment and Retraining of Crews VVS at Lipetsk. His information also suggests that the remnants of the 1080th Centre remained as the Borisoglebsk Aviation Garrison, which was disbanded in 2000.

The 160th Training Aviation Regiment remained active.

=== Russo-Ukrainian War ===
On 14 August 2024, during the Russo-Ukrainian War, the airbase was struck by a large-scale Ukrainian drone attack, damaging at least two hangars and potentially damaging two fighter aircraft, according to post-attack damage analysis by The New York Times and the Associated Press.

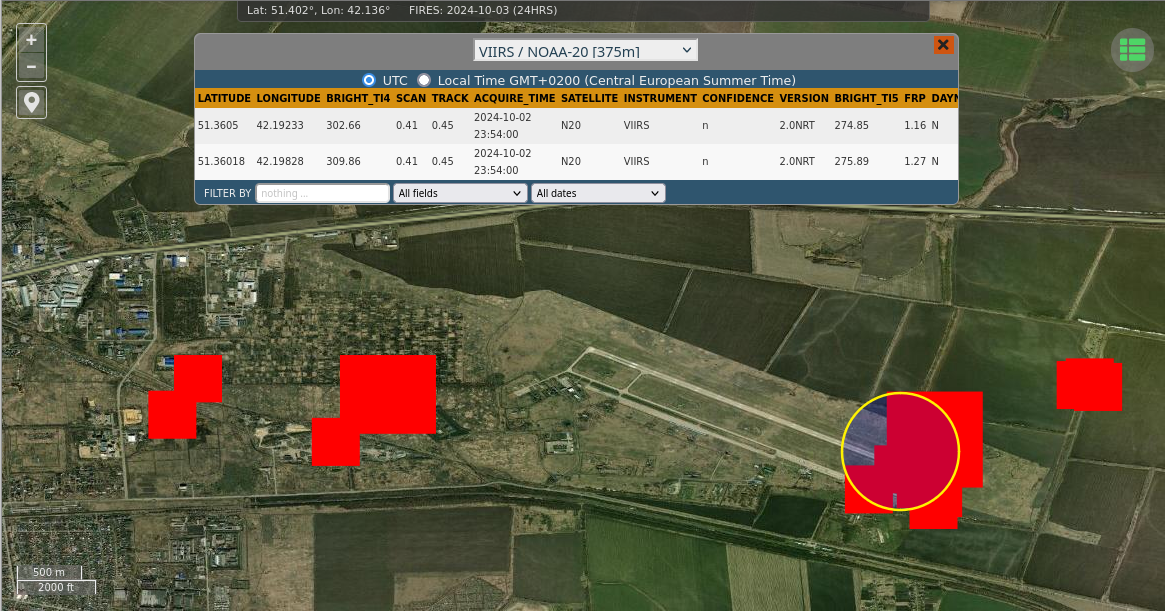
NASA's FIRMS detected multiple fires on and around Borisoglebsk air base on 2 October 2024 23:54:00 (UTC)

On 3 October 2024, Ukrainian drones struck the Borisoglebsk air base, targeting Su-34s, Su-35s, fuel tanks and a warehouse for Russian glide bombs. The attack was conducted by the SBU, the resulting fires were detected by NASA's FIRMS.

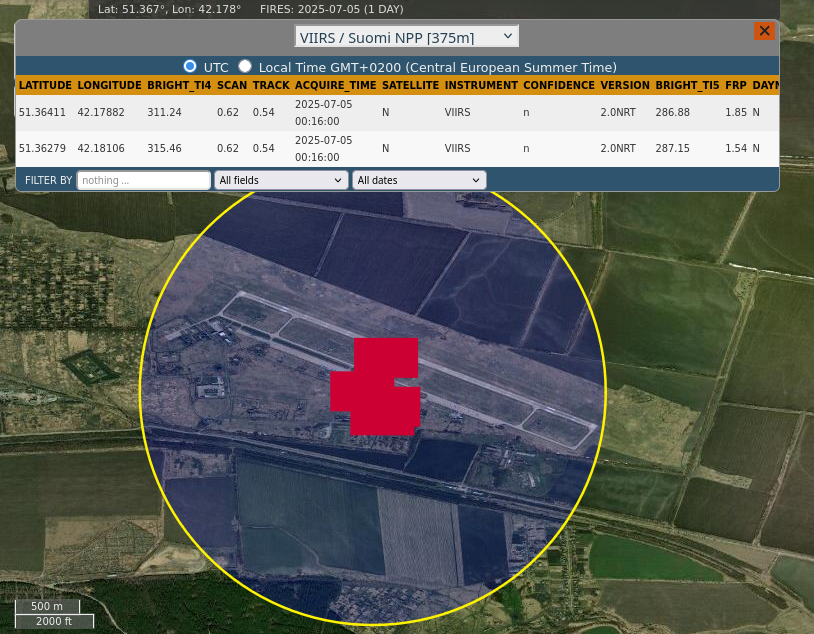
NASA's FIRMS detected fire at Borisoglebsk air base on 5 July 2025 00:16:00 (UTC)

On 5 July 2025, Borisoglebsk air base was attacked by drones, setting fire to the base, with NASA FIRMS showing the fire, while locals reported 8-10 explosions.

0n 15 October 2026, Borisoglebsk air base was attacked by Neptune missiles, four Su-34s were reportedly destroyed and two damaged along with support equipment.

== See also ==
- List of military airbases in Russia
