= Russian Falcons =

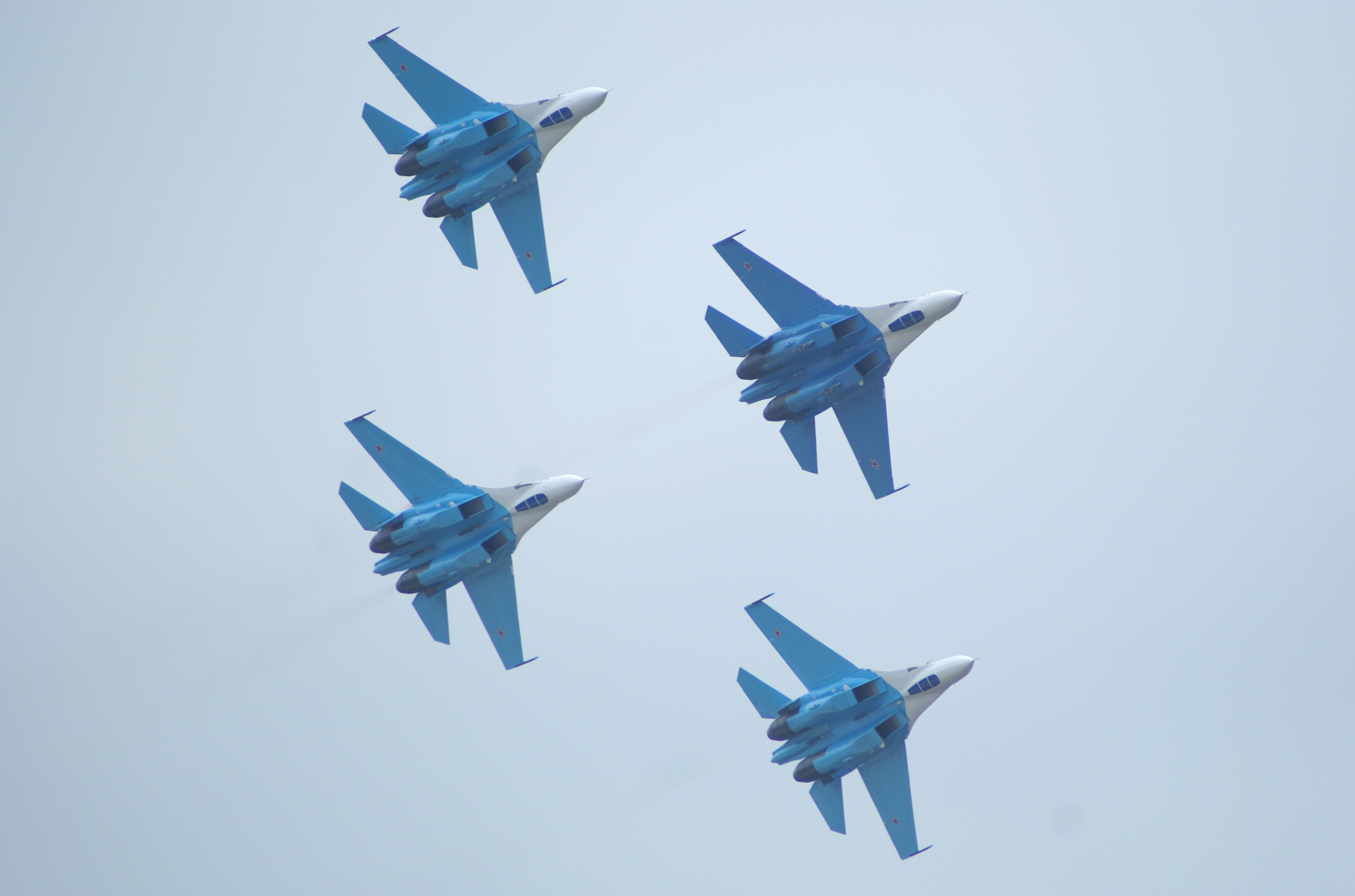
Sukhoi Su-27s of the Russian Falcons in 2009

The Russian Falcons (also Falcons of Russia, Russian: Соколы России) is an aerobatic demonstration team of the Russian Air Force, established in 2006 and based on Lipetsk Air Base. Originally led by Major General Alexander Kharchevsky until 2015, the group is presently under the leadership of Colonel Alexander Gostev. Over the years, the team has used various aircraft, including the Su-27, Su-30, Su-34, Su-35S, MiG-29, and Su-25. They have performed in various international locations, including France, Norway, Kazakhstan, Kyrgyzstan, and the Republic of Belarus. The Falcons of Russia have participated in numerous commemorative events, including celebrations marking the centenary of Hero of the Soviet Union Aleksey Maresyev and the 75th anniversary of the formation of the 11th Air and Air Defence Forces Army.

== See also ==
- Soviet air shows
- MAKS Air Show
- Swifts
