= 54th Guards Fighter Aviation Regiment =

237th Fighter Aviation Regiment (1941–1943) 54th Guards Fighter Aviation Regiment (1943–1960) 54th Guards Fighter Aviation Regiment PVO (1960–1992) 54th Guards Fighter Aviation Regiment (1992–2002) 3958th Air Base (2002–2005) 3958th Guards Air Base (2005–2011) Aviation Squadron of the State Center for Training of Aviation Personnel and Combat Testing (2011–present)
- Active: 1941–present
- Country: Soviet Union; Russia
- Branch: Soviet Air Forces; Soviet Air Defence Forces; Russian Air Defence Forces; Russian Air Force; Russian Aerospace Forces
- Type: Fighter Aviation regiment (air base from 2002, squadron from 2011)
- Garrison/HQ: Savasleyka (air base) (1992–present)
- Engagements: World War II
- Decorations: Order of the Red Banner
- Battle honours: Kerch

The 54th Guards Fighter Aviation Regiment (Russian: 54-й гвардейский истребительный авиационный полк (54 GIAP); Military Unit Number 06931) was an aviation regiment of the Soviet Air Forces during World War II and the Cold War, which became part of the Soviet Air Defense Forces and the Russian Aerospace Forces.

== World War II ==
The 237th Fighter Aviation Regiment began forming in May 1941. It began the war at Varėna outside Pskov in the Baltic Special Military District as part of the 57th Mixed Aviation Division. From August 1942 the regiment served in combat with the 220th Fighter Aviation Division. On 3 February 1943 the regiment became the 54th Guards Fighter Aviation Regiment and the division became the 1st Guards Fighter Aviation Division, mostly fighting as part of the 16th Air Army.

== Cold War ==
After the end of the war, the regiment received the Bell P-63 Kingcobra. It was based at Vaiņode in the Latvian Soviet Socialist Republic. The 54th Guards received the Mikoyan-Gurevich MiG-15 in 1950 and the Mikoyan-Gurevich MiG-17 in 1956. It became part of the Soviet Air Defense Forces' 27th Air Defense Corps after the 1st Guards Division headquarters disbanded in 1960. In 1967, the 54th Guards became one of the first regiments equipped with the Sukhoi Su-15 interceptor, and received the Su-15TM in the late 1970s. In 1987, the 54th Guards received the Sukhoi Su-27. By November 1990, according to CFE Treaty data, the regiment fielded 38 Su-27s.

== Russian service ==
In November 1992, under the command of Colonel Ye. A. Tikhomirov, the regiment was relocated to Savasleyka. On 1 September 2002, it was reorganized as the 3958th Air Base, part of the 4th Center for Combat Employment and Retraining of Personnel. On 26 March 2005, the honors of the 54th Guards were transferred to the 3958th, which became the 3958th Guards Air Base. In early 2011, the base became the Aviation Squadron of the State Center for Training of Aviation Personnel and Combat Testing after the 4th Center was redesignated.

== Aircraft operated ==
Aircraft operated by 237 IAP and 54 GIAP, data from
From	To	Aircraft	Version
May 1941	July 1941	Polikarpov I-153	
July 1941	1943	Yakovlev Yak-1	
July 1943		Bell P-39 Airacobra	
	1950	Bell P-63 Kingcobra	
July 1949	1950	Lavochkin La-9	
November 1950	1953	Mikoyan-Gurevich MiG-15	
1953	1967	Mikoyan-Gurevich MiG-17	
1955	1967	Yakovlev Yak-25	Yak-25M
1967	1987	Sukhoi Su-15	Su-15TM
1987	2002	Sukhoi Su-27	
1994	2002	Mikoyan MiG-31	

== Assignments ==
- 220th Fighter Aviation Division, August 1942 - 2.43
- 1st Guards Fighter Aviation Division, 2.43 - 1960
- 27th Air Defence Corps, 1960-12.77
- 1st Guards Fighter Aviation Division, 12.77 - 15.4.86
- 27th Air Defense Corps, 4.86 - 1992
- 148th Centre for Combat Employment and Retraining of Personnel PVO, 1992 - 2001
- 4th Centre for Combat Employment and Retraining of Personnel, 2001 - 2002

== Stations ==
- Guryevsk, Kaliningrad Oblast, May 1945 - August 1945 [54 47 15N, 20 37 10E]
- Vainode, Latvian SSR, 8.45 - 1992 [56 24 27N, 21 53 19E]
- Savostleyka, Gorkiy Oblast, 1992 - present [55 26 32N, 42 18 35E]
