= Seshcha Air Base =

Russian Aerospace Forces base in Rostov Oblast

Seshcha
- Dubrovka, Bryansk Oblast in Russia
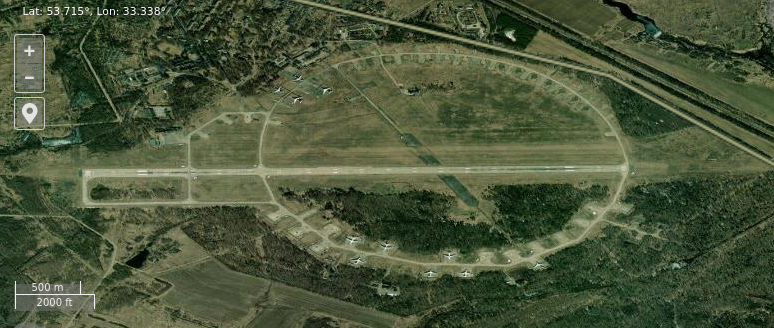
- Satellite imagery of Seshcha air base

Site information
- Type: Air Base
- Owner: Ministry of Defence
- Operator: Russian Aerospace Forces
- Controlled by: Military Transport Aviation

Location
- Shown within Bryansk Oblast, Russia Seshcha (Russia)
- Coordinates: 53°42′54″N 33°20′20″E

Site history
- Built: 1931
- In use: circa 1931 - present
- Battles/wars: 2022 Russian invasion of Ukraine

Airfield information
- Identifiers: ICAO: UUWD
- Elevation: 210 metres (689 ft) AMSL
Runways
Direction	Length and surface
08/26	3,070 metres (10,072 ft) Concrete

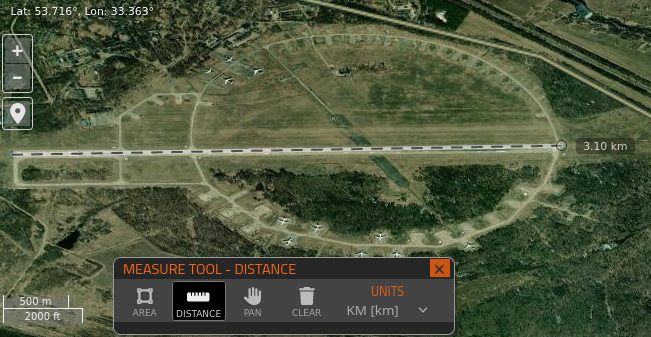
NASA's FIRMS shows runway 08/26 extended to 3.10 km

Seshcha is an air base near Dubrovka, Bryansk Oblast of the Russian Aerospace Forces as part of Military Transport Aviation.

As of 2022, the base was home to the 566th Military Transport Aviation Regiment which flies the Antonov An-124 (NATO: Condor) of the 12th Military Transport Aviation Division. The regiment first arrived at the base in August 1958.

== History ==
The airbase was placed in operation in the early 1930s.

== See also ==
- List of military airbases in Russia
