= Michurinsk Air Base =

Airport in Tambov Oblast, Russia

Michurinsk
- Michurinsk, Tambov Oblast in Russia
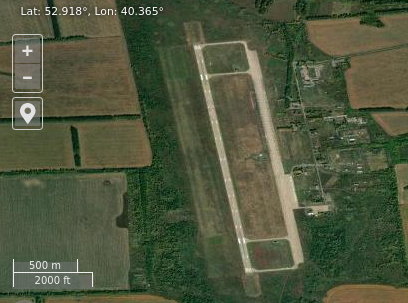
- Satellite imagery of Michurinsk air base

Site information
- Type: Air Base
- Owner: Ministry of Defence
- Operator: Russian Aerospace Forces

Location
- Shown within Tambov Oblast Michurinsk (Russia)
- Coordinates: 52°55′6″N 40°21′54″E

Site history
- Built: 1952
- In use: 1952 - present

Airfield information
- Identifiers: ICAO: XUWM
- Elevation: 164 metres (538 ft) AMSL
Runways
Direction	Length and surface
17/35	2,200 metres (7,218 ft) Concrete

Michurinsk (also given as Michurinsk Northwest, and Kozlov (before 1932)) is an air base in Russia located 9 km northwest of Michurinsk. It is the site of a well-maintained military training airfield.

The base is to the 644th Training Aviation Regiment which flies the Aero L-39C Albatros as part of the 786th Aviation Training Centre for the Training of Flight Personnel.

The training unit at Michurinsk is 644 UAP (644th Aviation Training Regiment) equipped with 108 Aero L-29 Delfin aircraft listed as of the early 1990s. It has also been equipped recently with Su-24, Su-25, and MiG-29 aircraft. The 644th Training Aviation Regiment was part of the 786th Training Centre, headquartered at Borisoglebsk, in 2008, according to Kommersant-Vlast.

== See also ==
- List of military airbases in Russia
