= Saratov West Air Base =

Russian airbase

Saratov West Sokol Razboyshchina
- Saratov, Saratov Oblast in Russia
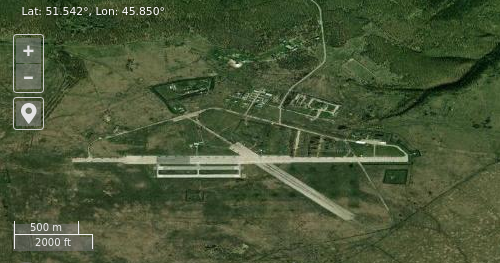
- Satellite imagery of Saratov air base

Site information
- Type: Air Base
- Owner: Ministry of Defence
- Operator: Russian Aerospace Forces

Location
- Shown within Saratov Oblast Saratov West (Russia)
- Coordinates: 51°32′30″N 45°51′00″E

Site history
- Built: 1940
- In use: 1940 - present

Airfield information
- Identifiers: ICAO: XWSS
- Elevation: 288 metres (945 ft) AMSL
Helipads
Number	Length and surface
08L/26R	480 metres (1,575 ft) Concrete
08R/26L	480 metres (1,575 ft) Concrete

Saratov West is an air base in Russia located 12 km west of Saratov. It is a military training airfield.

The base is home to the 131st Training Helicopter Regiment as part of the Zhukovsky – Gagarin Air Force Academy.

== See also ==
- List of military airbases in Russia
