= Savasleyka air base =

Military air base in Nizhny Novgorod Oblast, Russia

Savasleyka Murom
- Vyksa, Nizhny Novgorod Oblast in Russia
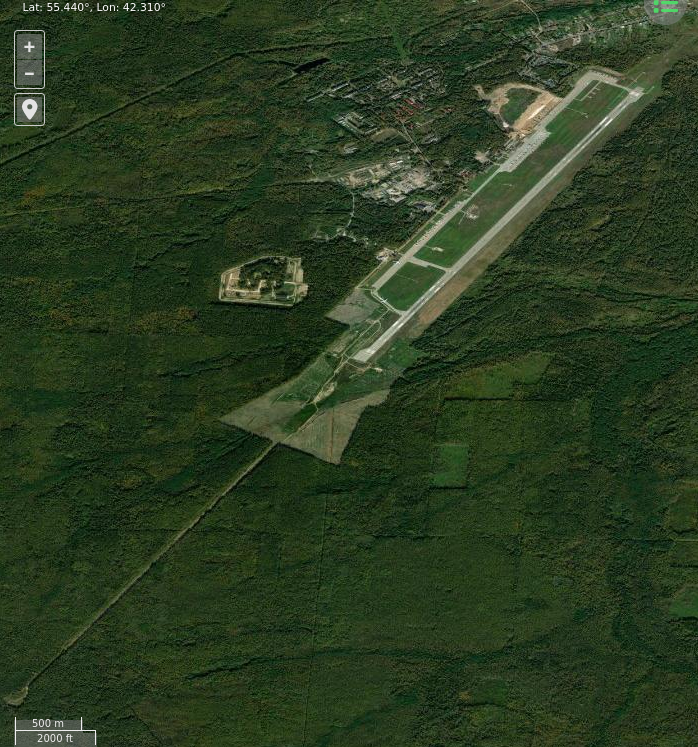
- Satellite imagery of Savasleyka air base

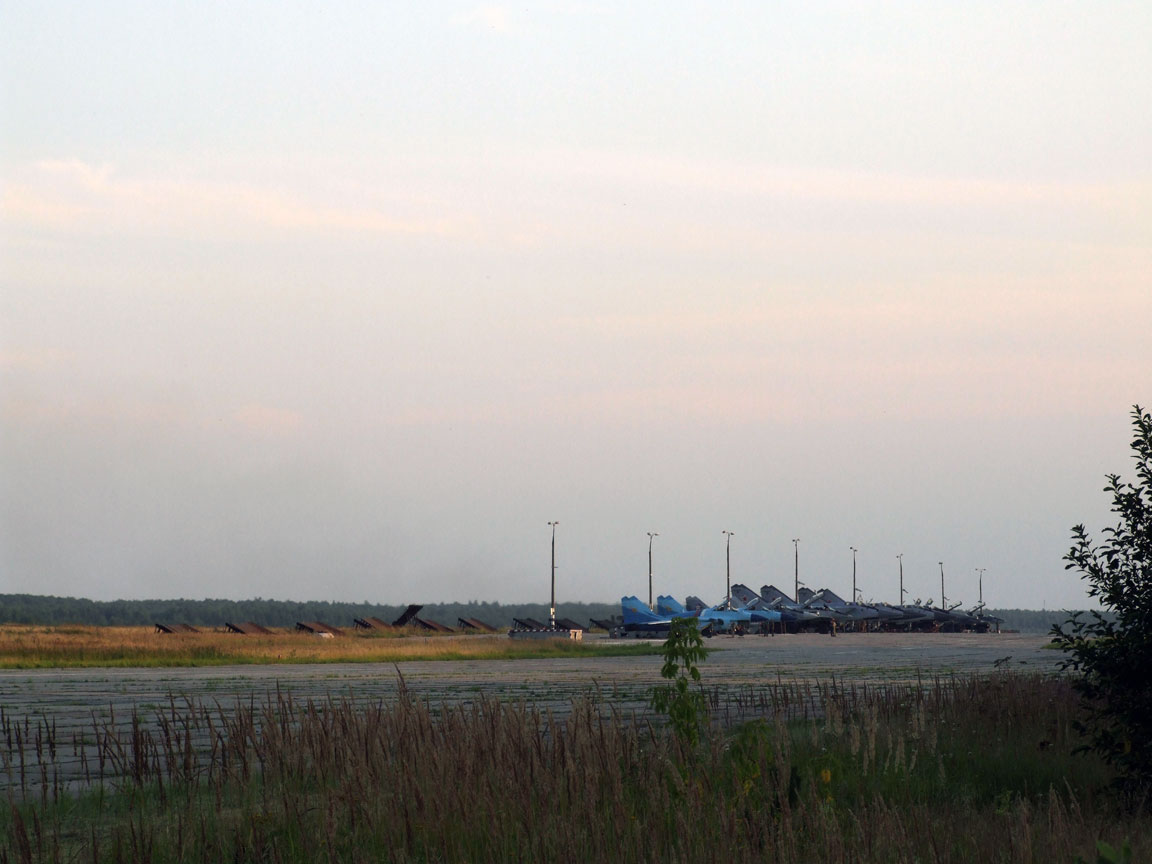
- View of Savasleyka airbase, 18 August 2009

Site information
- Type: Air Base
- Owner: Ministry of Defence
- Operator: Russian Aerospace Forces

Location
- Shown within Nizhny Novgorod Oblast Savasleyka (Russia)
- Coordinates: 55°26′24″N 42°18′36″E

Site history
- Built: 1953
- In use: 1953 - present

Airfield information
- Elevation: 102 metres (335 ft) AMSL
Runways
Direction	Length and surface
02/20	2,500 metres (8,202 ft) Concrete

Savasleyka air base (Russian: Саваслейка) is a military air base in Nizhny Novgorod Oblast, Russia. It is located near the village of Savasleyka in Kulebaksky District, between the towns of Vyksa (which is 16 km southwest of the airfield), Kulebaki (some 10 km to the east of the base) and Navashino (some 10 km to the northwest of the airfield).

The name of the base is also often transcribed into English as Savasleika; sometimes it is misspelled as Savastleyka or Savostleyka. The base has also been referred to as Murom, after the city of Murom that is some 25 km northwest, in the neighboring Vladimir Oblast.

As of 2022, the base was home to the 3958th Aviation Base with the Mikoyan MiG-31 (NATO: Foxhound) as part of the 4th Centre for Combat Application and Crew Training.

== History ==
The history of the airfield goes back to 1953–54, when the Training Center of the Aviation of the Air Defence Forces (Russian: Краснознамённый учебно-методический центр авиации ПВО) was moved to Savasleyka from Seyma (Volodarsk).

The Tupolev Tu-128 (NATO: Fiddler) was originally fielded at Savasleyka in 1964. It is a small airfield with a utilitarian layout and a small number of unpaved fighter revetments.

Savasleyka was home to 54th Guards Fighter Aviation Regiment (54 Gv IAP) with Sukhoi Su-27 (NATO: Flanker) aircraft in 1994 and today, as part of the 4th Aircrew Combat Training Centre at Lipetsk Air Base. The 54th Guards Fighter Aviation Regiment had previously been based at Vainode Air Base in the Latvian SSR. The 4th absorbed the previous 148 TsBP i PLS (Aircrew Combat Training and Retraining Centre) of the PVO (Air Defense) with Sukhoi Su-17 (NATO: Fitter), Su-27, MiG-31MLD, and Mil Mi-8 aircraft after 1998.

A small aircraft museum was operated at the base.

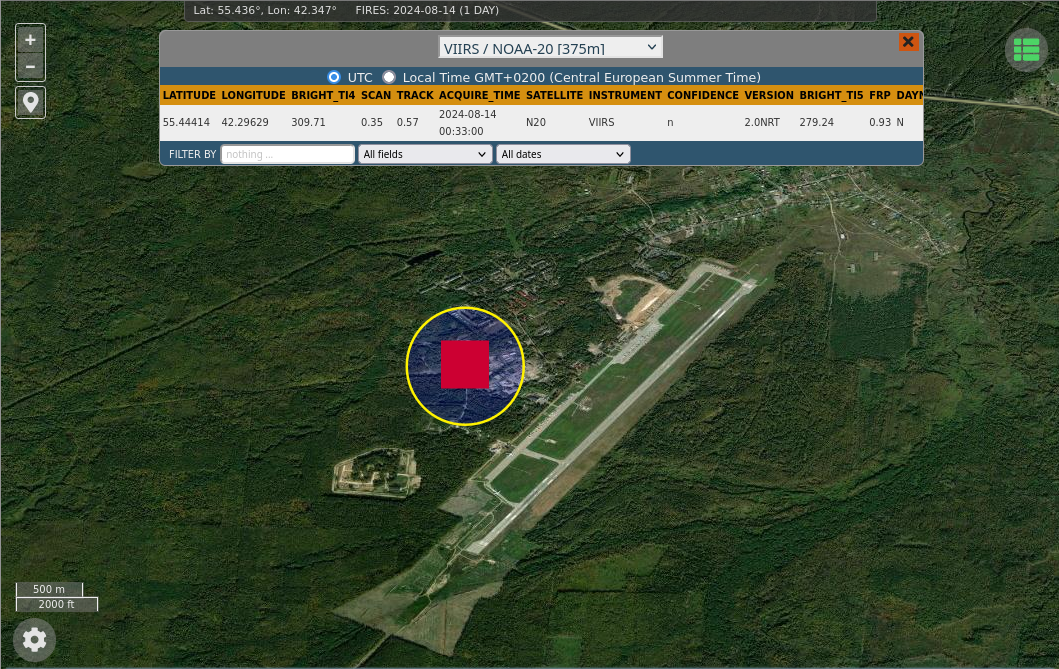
NASA's FIRMS imagery from 14 August 2024 00:33:00 (UTC) showing a fire at Savasleyka air base

On 13 and 16 August 2024, during the Russo-Ukrainian War, the airbase was struck by Ukrainian drones, resulting in explosions and destruction of several aircraft and a fuel depot, with damage to several others. Gleb Nikitin, the Governor of Nizhny Novgorod Oblast, said that the 13 August raid had been repelled without any casualties, and post-attack damage analysis by the Associated Press located a burn mark on the apron, but no obvious damage to aircraft. NASA FIRMS imagery is consistent with a fuel depot fire on 14 August 2024. After the second attack on 16 August, a Ukrainian military intelligence source told The Kyiv Independent that some three Russian aircraft were destroyed and five damaged by the two attacks. The destroyed aircraft were believed to be a MiG-31K and two Il-76s.

On 9 June 2025, Ukrainian drones struck the Savasleyka air base, damaging a MiG-31 and a Su-30 or Su-34. The battle damage was still being assessed.

== Accidents ==
19 February 1958 and an emergency landing of a passenger plane Tupolev Tu-104 (on-board number L5414, one of the first production Tu-104), which carried out a training flight on the route Novosibirsk – Sverdlovsk – Moscow. When approaching Moscow Vnukovo airport, the crew reported a shortage of fuel to complete the flight and requested landing at the Dyagilevo airfield Ryazan Region). In adverse weather conditions, the crew lost its orientation and was unable to reach the Dyagilevo driving radio station. The plane was sent to Savasleyka. With a decrease, the fuel reserves were exhausted, the engines stopped, and the plane made an emergency landing in the forest, not having reached 1.5 kilometers before the end of the runway. In the future, the aircraft was restored, transferred to Moscow and installed at VDNKh as an exhibit.

In 1973, when performing aerobatic maneuvers in the aerodrome zone, the inspector pilot Colonel Nadtochiev died on MiG-23. There was a destruction of the rotary mechanism of the wing of variable sweep with the subsequent explosion on board. The wing, which fell on the airfield, was torn off, almost killing the officer, who at the last moment had been dragged off by other officers. As the mechanics who observed the flight from the sites, the explosion occurred after several sharp dives into the lane: with a sharp exit from the next dive, the plane sharply jerked and disappeared into the fire cloud of the explosion, from which turbines and large fragments flew. The airfield directly under the crash site, where I ran out of the barracks of the 2nd regiment, was littered with a layer of small smoking debris. In the distance, there were several larger fragments in various places. In the middle of the strip, I remember the flight white helmet, and under it on the concrete – a scattering of blue plastic fragments of light-protective cover and inscription around the Nadtochiev earphone ...

30 September 1991 and the plane crashed MiG-31B under the command of Major Shapovalov S. A. and Pilot-Navigator Lieutenant Colonel M. V. Subbotin, performing a training flight before upcoming display of aviation technology. In violation of the flight mission, the takeoff was made without flaps. After the detachment and transfer of the aircraft to climb at a speed of 390–400 km / h, the pilot did not take into account the increased efficiency stabilizer, "not covered" by flaps, and the usual movement РУС (in terms of pace, magnitude of movement and effort) brought the plane to a supercritical angle of attack 20 °, which led to its stalling. Flight accidents were also aided by the unsatisfactory organization of crew training for a special flight from the command side. As a result, the plane collided with the ground and collapsed. The crew's ejection was carried out by the navigator's decision at an altitude of 120–150 m at a speed of 410–420 km / h. The navigator was unharmed, the commander of the crew died due to lack of height and high speed of descent. The ejection of the navigator took place approximately parallel to the ground. In this case, the plane rotated along the axis of flight. Bailout commander happened head down. The pilot collided at high speed with a thick birch (about 25–30 cm in diameter), which broke in half from a blow, the plane fell 20–30 meters. The navigator, after landing, carried the deceased comrade away from the wreckage.

On 30 October 1991, the second MiG-31 was lost. During the climb at the afterburner there was a fire engine. The pilots ejected. Upon landing, one broke his arm, the other leg. The plane fell, the engines from a strike went deep into the ground, the glider bounced off the ground and exploded.

February 1994. When flying to SMU Su-27UB got into a snow charge, which caused the failure of the flight-navigation equipment. With a line-of-sight distance of no more than 200–300 m and a lower margin of no more than 50–100 m, the pilots were able to find an airfield and land the aircraft with an overhead landing speed. The breakage of the braking parachute and ice caused the aircraft to roll out of the lane. The emergency arresting device that was triggered was pulled out of the attachment points, the plane cone and the landing gear were torn off. The pilots were not injured and not ejected. The crew commander was removed from flight work. After long attempts to restore the aircraft, the Su-27UB (tail number 40) was decommissioned and installed in the aviation museum in the garrison of Savasleigh.

== See also ==
- List of military airbases in Russia
