= Korenovsk (air base) =

Airport in Krasnodar Krai, Russia

Korenovsk
- Korenovsk, Krasnodar Krai in Russia
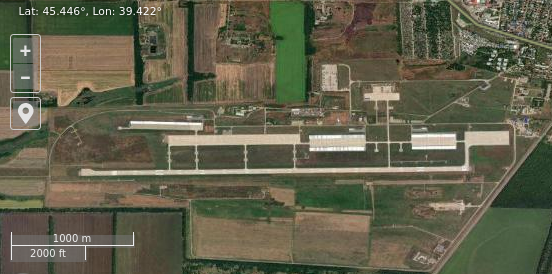
- Satellite imagery of Korenovsk air base

Site information
- Type: Air Base
- Owner: Ministry of Defence
- Operator: Russian Aerospace Forces
- Controlled by: 4th Air and Air Defence Forces Army

Location
- Shown within Krasnodar Krai Korenovsk (Russia)
- Coordinates: 45°26′46″N 39°25′18″E

Site history
- In use: present

Airfield information
- Identifiers: ICAO: URKO
- Elevation: 49 metres (161 ft) AMSL
Runways
Direction	Length and surface
08/26	2,385 metres (7,825 ft) Concrete

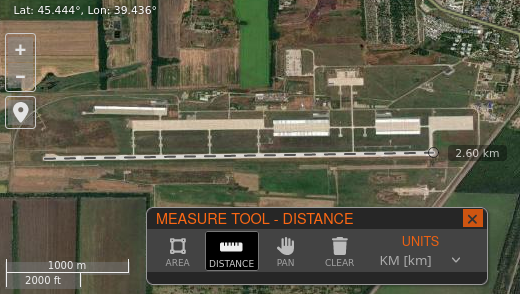
NASA's FIRMS shows runway 08/26 to be 2.60 km

Korenovsk is an airbase of the Russian Aerospace Forces located near Korenovsk, Krasnodar Krai, Russia.

The base is home to the 55th Independent Helicopter Regiment.

As of 2024 satellite imagery showed runway 08/26 to be extended to 2.60 km.

== See also ==
- List of military airbases in Russia
