= Syzran (air base) =

Russian Aerospace Forces air base

Syzran Troekurovsk
- Сызрань
- Syzran, Samara Oblast in Russia
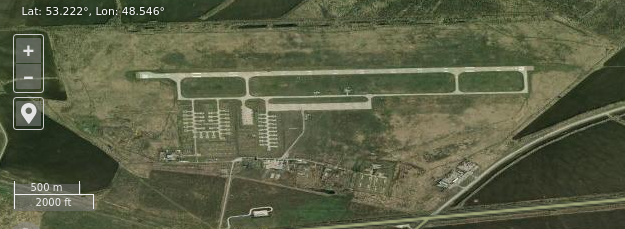
- Satellite imagery of Syzran air base

Site information
- Type: Air Base
- Owner: Ministry of Defence
- Operator: Russian Aerospace Forces

Location
- Shown within Samara Oblast Syzran (Russia)
- Coordinates: 53°13′20″N 48°32′44″E

Site history
- In use: present

Airfield information
- Identifiers: ICAO: UWWS
- Elevation: 112 metres (367 ft) AMSL
Runways
| Direction | Length and surface |
|---|---|
| 08/26 | 2,190 metres (7,185 ft) Concrete |

Syzran (also Troekurovsk or Troekurovka) is an airbase of the Russian Aerospace Forces located near Syzran, Samara Oblast, Russia.

The base is home to the 484th Training Helicopter Regiment with the Mil Mi-24 as part of the Prof. N.E. Zhukovsky and Iu.A. Gagarin Air Force Academy.

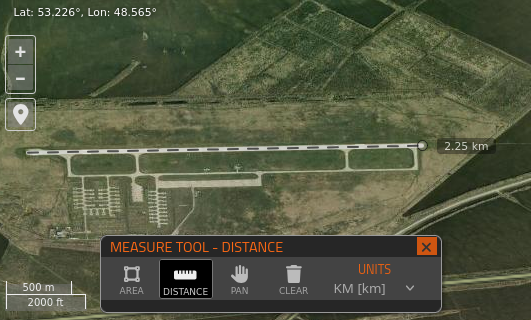
NASA's FIRMS shows runway 08/26 to be 2.25 km

== See also ==
- List of military airbases in Russia
