= Severny (air base) =

- IATA: none; ICAO: none

Summary
- Airport type: Military
- Operator: Russian Air Force
- Location: Orsk
- Elevation AMSL: 850 ft / 259 m
- Coordinates: 51°4′0″N 61°29′0″E
- Interactive map of Severny

Runways
Direction	Length		Surface
Direction	ft	m	Surface
	11,483	3,500	Concrete

Severny was a 1960s era air base in Russia located 200 km east of Orsk. It was a 1960s-era Soviet bomber base. The facility was mostly plowed under but 8 large pads are noted. It is located only 3 km from the Kazakhstan border to east. Severny means "North" in Russian: Северный).

There is also an airport named Severny in Smolensk Oblast, the site of the 10 April 2010 crash of the Polish flight which killed the Polish President and approximately 95 other passengers.

== See also ==
- List of Soviet Air Force bases
