= Khabarovsk Tsentralny =

Airport in Khabarovsk Krai, Russia

Khabarovsk Tsentralny Khabarovsk/Bolshoy
- Khabarovsk, Khabarovsk Krai in Russia
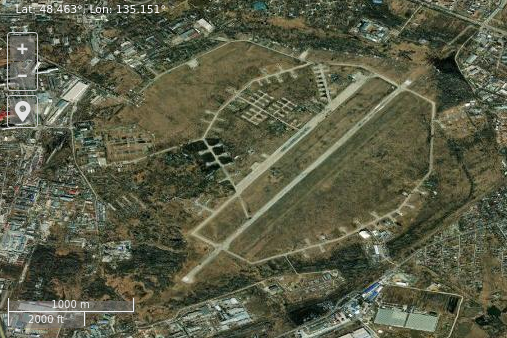
- Satellite imagery of Khabarovsk Tsentralny air base

Site information
- Type: Air Base
- Owner: Ministry of Defence
- Operator: Russian Aerospace Forces
- Controlled by: 11th Air and Air Defence Forces Army

Location
- Shown within Khabarovsk Krai Khabarovsk Tsentralny (Russia)
- Coordinates: 48°27′45″N 135°09′02″E

Site history
- Built: 1926
- In use: 1926 - present

Airfield information
- Identifiers: ICAO: UHHA
- Elevation: 59 metres (194 ft) AMSL
Runways
Direction	Length and surface
05/23	2,400 metres (7,874 ft) Concrete

Khabarovsk Tsentralny (Russian: Хабаровск-Центральный, locally Khabarovsk Bolshoi or "Большой аэродром"), is the primary Russian military airfield in Khabarovsk. It is located on the east side of the city, about 8 km southwest of Khabarovsk Novy Airport. The aerodrome operator is the Ministry of Defense of the Russian Federation, along with the 573rd Aviation Base of Army Aviation, and 12th Aircraft Repair Factory.

The base is home to the 35th Independent Transport Composite Aviation Regiment and the 18th Army Aviation Brigade along with the 1st Independent Composite Aviation Squadron and the Far East Aviation Service Center (JSC DASC).

== History ==
In 1926, the 26th Separate Fighter Squadron was formed in Khabarovsk as part of a separate Far Eastern Army.

In 1928, an aviation unit was formed in Khabarovsk - the 68th Separate River Hydropower Unit, armed with 14 MR-1 aircraft. A year later, the detachment took part in the conflict on the Chinese Eastern Railway. The home of the flying boats was Amur. Subsequently, the Krasnaya Rechka hydroairdrome was equipped, with submission to the command of the Amur military flotilla .

In the summer of 1932, the 105th, 106th and 107th Heavy Bomber Squadrons of the 19th Aviation Brigade on Tupolev TB-3 aircraft flew from Moscow region (likely Bologoye) to Khabarovsk. In 1934, the 60th aviation workshops of the Military Air Fleet were formed in the city of Khabarovsk, carrying out the repair of airplanes and engines. The location of the workshops in the area of the current .

In 1938, a concrete runway was built at the airfield to receive all types of aircraft. It was the second Khabarovsk airfield: the first civil airport was built in 1932, which became Khabarovsk MVL Airfield (located 2 km west of the current Khabarovsk Novy Airport.

The 1st Separate Air Squadron (Mixed) of the Ministry of Internal Affairs (MVD) was formed on March 3, 1979, at Khabarovsk Tsentralny, consisting of 4 units of three Mi-8 helicopters and one Antonov An-26 transport, as well as a separate helicopter based link 1st UAE (OBAZ) at the airfield Chita-1. It was the first aviation unit in the structure of the MVD. MVD, March 3 was declared the day the creation of aviation of internal troops. In 1980, the 2nd UAE was formed, also based in Khabarovsk. Both squadrons were created to support the activities of the 103rd and 104th Railway Divisions of the USSR Ministry of Internal Affairs. On the basis of these two squadrons, five more aviation units were subsequently formed, with locations throughout the USSR in Nizhny Novgorod, Syktyvkar, Sverdlovsk, Novosibirsk and Alma-Ata. In 1987, the 2nd UAE was withdrawn to Chita and twenty years later was transferred to Irkutsk. The 1st UAE continues to be stationed at Khabarovsk Tsentralny airfield, with a staff of three helicopters and two An-26s.

== See also ==
- List of military airbases in Russia
