= Temp (air base) =

Military air base

Temp
- Kotelny Island, Sakha in Russia
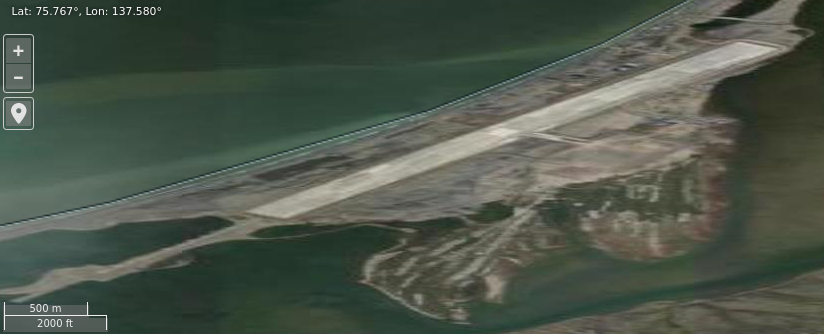
- Satellite imagery of Temp air base

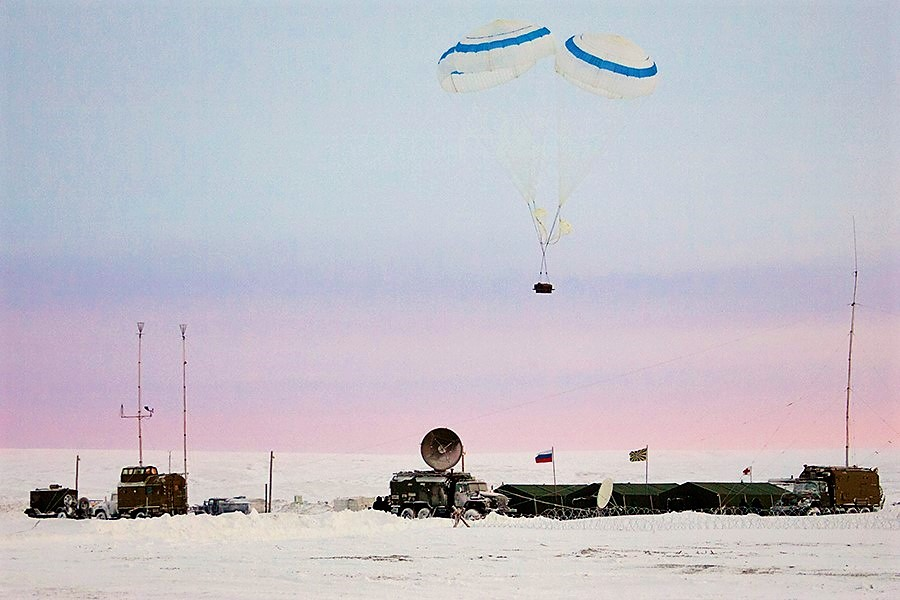

Site information
- Type: Air Base
- Owner: Ministry of Defence
- Operator: Russian Aerospace Forces

Location
- Shown within Russia
- Coordinates: 75°46′0″N 137°34′48″E

Site history
- Built: 1949
- In use: 1949 - present

Airfield information
- Identifiers: ICAO: XEBT
- Elevation: 30 metres (98 ft) AMSL
Runways
Direction	Length and surface
11/29	2,500 metres (8,202 ft) Concrete

Temp (Темп; Russian for "pace") is a Russian military air base established in 2013 at the western end of Kotelny Island, serving the station Severny Klever ('Northern Clover' or 'Northern Shamrock'). It was established as part of a national initiative to secure Russia's arctic regions.

The base is home to the Aviation Command, 182nd Guards Heavy Bomber Aviation Regiment of the 326th Heavy Bomber Aviation Division.

== History ==
Temp was originally developed in 1949 and was a minor polar airfield during the Soviet era. Communication with the mainland at Tiksi Airport was supported by Lisunov Li-2 aircraft. The station consisted of two log barracks, a garage and tents. The Kieng-Uras fishing and hunting station was located nearby, which included 5 buildings. To the north of Temp station, at the northern tip of Temp Bay, there was a fishing and hunting station Bysakh-Karga.

In the 1960s, a radar surveillance site was installed, along with a company of soldiers. In the 1970s, some seismology research was done. In 1993, the station was mothballed. Around 2010, in the face of increasing international competition for Arctic resources, the Russian government decided to restore the station. This work began October 29, 2013. The runway of the airfield is located on a pebble spit separating the Gulf of Stakhanovtsev Arctic from the lagoon, and is capable of servicing Antonov An-72 aircraft. The base serves about 50 military personnel.

On the night of March 13–14, 2014, an airborne paratroop battalion of the Ivanovo 98th Airborne Division with 350 soldiers landed on an island near the airfield as part of a readiness exercise. The personnel landed with the use of controlled parachute systems. After the landing, the soldiers “captured” the airfield for 40 minutes. This marked the first time such exercises were held in the Russian Arctic.

In September 2014, the 99th Tactic Arctic Group permanently established the base by beginning construction of a runway, pier and accommodation for troops and their families. The airfield is now able to receive Ilyushin Il-76 aircraft all year long which significantly improves the bases ability to re-supply. The base is known in Russian as the Northern Shamrock.

== See also ==
- List of military airbases in Russia
- Nagurskoye (air base)
