= Tambov air base =

Airport in Tambov Oblast, Russia

Tambov Tambov/Vostochniy
- Тамбов/Восточный
- Tambov, Tambov Oblast in Russia
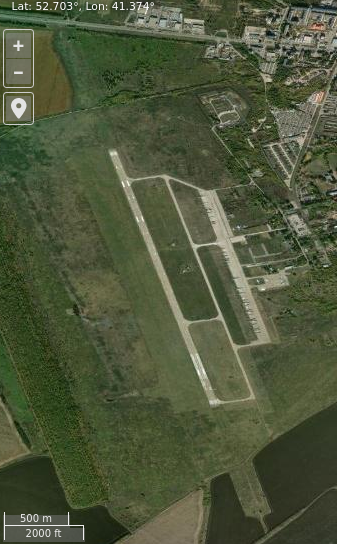
- Satellite imagery of Tambov air base

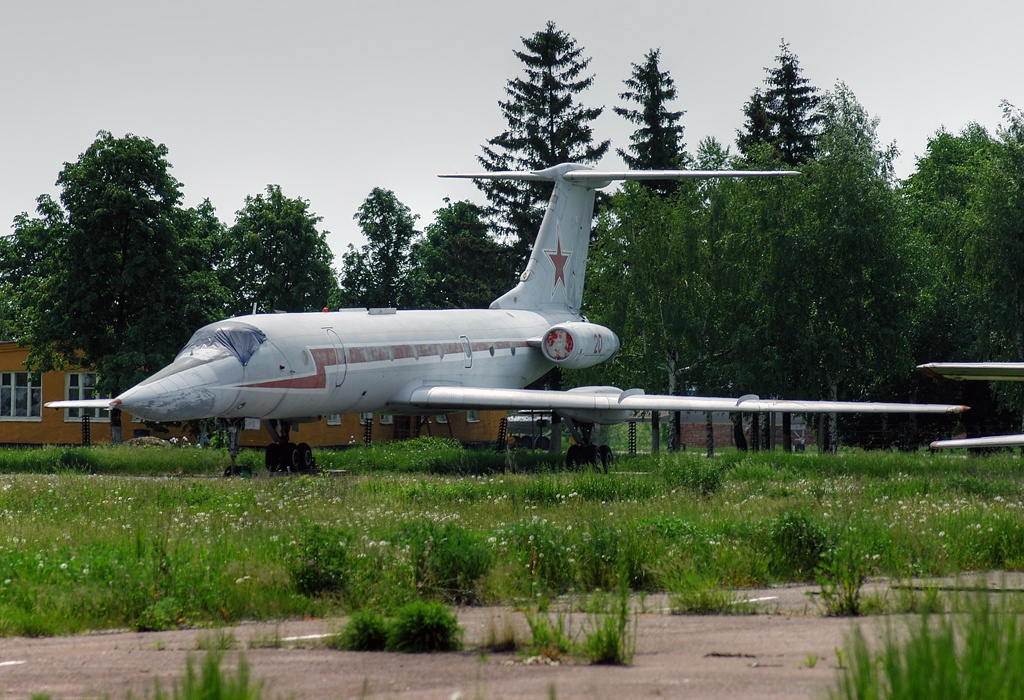
- Tu-134UB parked up

Site information
- Type: Air Base
- Owner: Ministry of Defence
- Operator: Russian Aerospace Forces
- Controlled by: Long-Range Aviation

Location
- Shown within Tambov Oblast Tambov (Russia)
- Coordinates: 52°42′10″N 41°22′25″E

Site history
- Built: 1954
- In use: 1954 - present

Airfield information
- Elevation: 169 metres (554 ft) AMSL
Runways
Direction	Length and surface
16/34	2,500 metres (8,202 ft) Concrete

Tambov is an air base in Russia located 4 km southwest of Tambov. It is a bomber training base with many Tupolev Tu-134UBL aircraft.

The base is home to the 27th Composite Aviation Regiment with the Antonov An-12 (ASCC: Cub), Antonov An-26 (ASCC: Curl) & Tupolev Tu-134UBL(UBSh) (ASCC: Crusty) which is part of the 43rd Guards Oryol Center for Combat Employment and Retraining of Long-Range Aviation Flight Personnel.

== History ==
Yefim Gordon's MiG-23/27 book refers to a 652 UAP (652nd Aviation Training Regiment) stationed at Tambov/Vostochnyy flying 96 Aero L-29 Delfín (ASCC: Maya).

Tambov used to be home to 4255 BRS flying Mikoyan-Gurevich MiG-23 (ASCC: Flogger) aircraft.

Tambov used to be the location of the 301st Aircraft Repair Factory (ARZ) which became the 3119th Aviation Base for the Storage and Disposal of Aviation Equipment in mid-2001. Hundreds of fast jets may have been stored for disposal here at sometime in the past.

== See also ==
- List of military airbases in Russia
