= Korenovsk =

Town in Krasnodar Krai, Russia

Korenovsk Кореновск
- Town
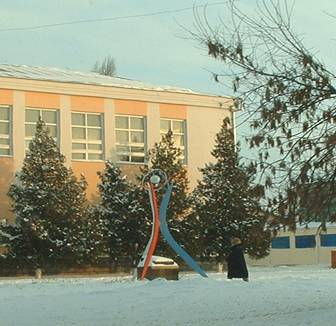
- A sign in Korenovsk marking the geographical center of Krasnodar Krai

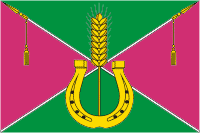
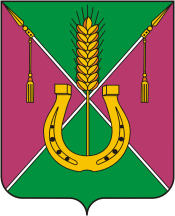
- Flag Coat of arms
- Interactive map of Korenovsk
- Location of Korenovsk Korenovsk (Krasnodar Krai)
- Coordinates: 45°28′07″N 39°27′07″E
- Country: Russia
- Federal subject: Krasnodar Krai
- Administrative district: Korenovsky District
- TownSelsoviet: Korenovsk
- Founded: 1794
- Town status since: 1961
- Elevation: 37 m (121 ft)

Population (2010 Census)
  - Total: 41,166
  - Estimate (2025): 40,944 (−0.5%)

Administrative status
  - Capital of: Korenovsky District, Town of Korenovsk

Municipal status
  - Municipal district: Korenovsky Municipal District
  - Urban settlement: Korenovskoye Urban Settlement
  - Capital of: Korenovsky Municipal District, Korenovskoye Urban Settlement
- Time zone: UTC+3 (MSK)
- Postal code: 353180 — 353187
- Dialing code: +7 86142
- OKTMO ID: 03621101001
- Website: korenovsk-gorod.ru

Korenovsk (Russian: Корено́вск) is a town and the administrative center of Korenovsky District of Krasnodar Krai, Russia, located on the Beysuzhyok Levy River (a tributary of the Beysug) 64 kilometers (40 mi) northeast of Krasnodar. Population: 42,418 (2020), 41,166 (2010 census); 40,844 (2002 census); 35,768 (1989 Soviet census).

== History ==
It was founded in 1794 by Cossacks of the Black Sea Cossack Army as Korenovskoye (Корено́вское), called so to commemorate a kurin of the same name in the Zaporozhian Host. Since the end of the 19th century, it had been known as the stanitsa of Korenovskaya (Корено́вская).

During the Great Patriotic War, local Jewish community was murdered by an Einsatzgruppe.

Town status was granted in 1961.

Korenovsk (air base), a Russian Aerospace Forces airbase is nearby.

== Administrative and municipal status ==
Within the framework of administrative divisions, Korenovsk serves as the administrative center of Korenovsky District. As an administrative division, it is, together with four rural localities, incorporated within Korenovsky District as the Town of Korenovsk. As a municipal division, the Town of Korenovsk is incorporated within Korenovsky Municipal District as Korenovskoye Urban Settlement.
