= Voronezh Malshevo (air base) =

Air base in Voronezh Oblast, Russia

Voronezh Malshevo
- Voronezh, Voronezh Oblast in Russia
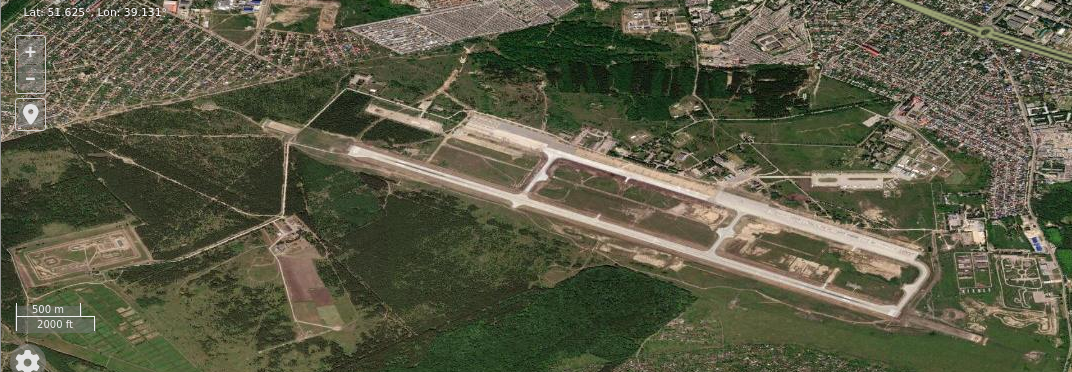
- Satellite imagery of Voronezh Malshevo air base

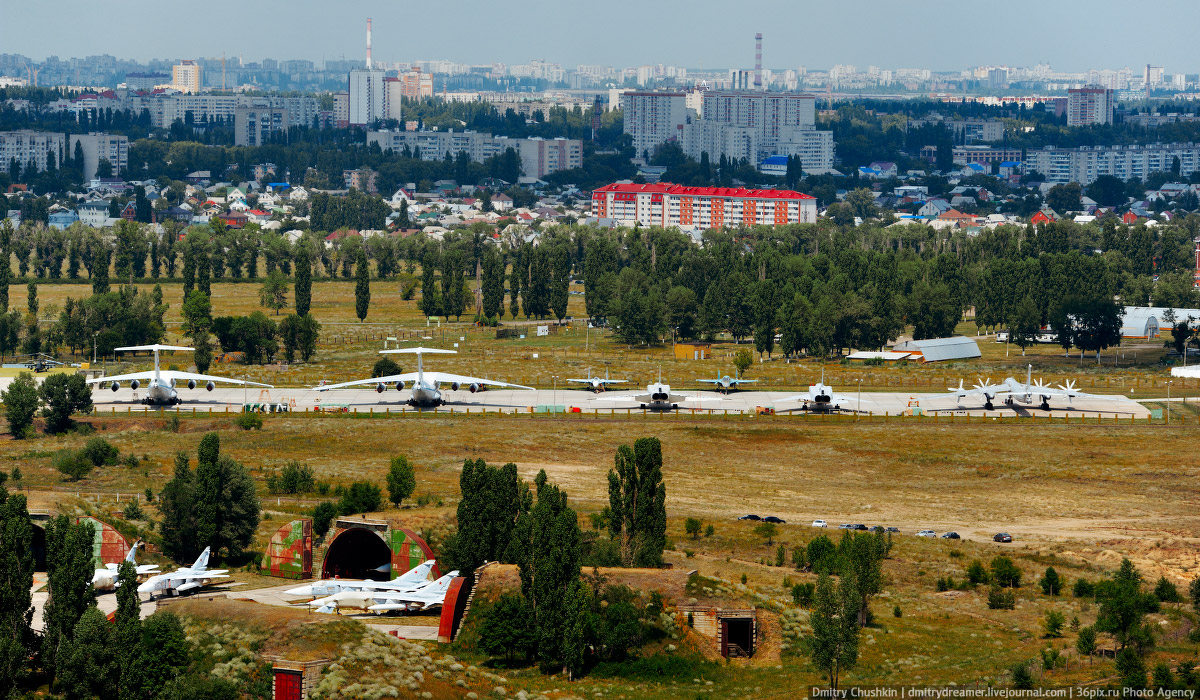

Site information
- Owner: Ministry of Defence
- Operator: Russian Aerospace Forces
- Controlled by: 6th Air and Air Defence Forces Army

Location
- Shown within Voronezh Oblast, Russia Voronezh Malshevo (Russia)
- Coordinates: 51°37′29″N 39°07′53″E

Site history
- In use: Unknown - present

Airfield information
- Identifiers: ICAO: UUOW
- Elevation: 153 metres (502 ft) AMSL
Runways
Direction	Length and surface
11/29	2,500 metres (8,202 ft) Concrete

Voronezh Malshevo is an air base in Voronezh Oblast of the Russian Aerospace Forces as part of the 6th Air and Air Defence Forces Army, Western Military District. The base is also known as Malshevo, Mal'shevo, Voronezh Southwest, Voronezh Baltimor and Baltimore. The base is home to the 47th Composite Guards Aviation Regiment which operates two squadrons of Sukhoi Su-34s (ASCC: Fullback).

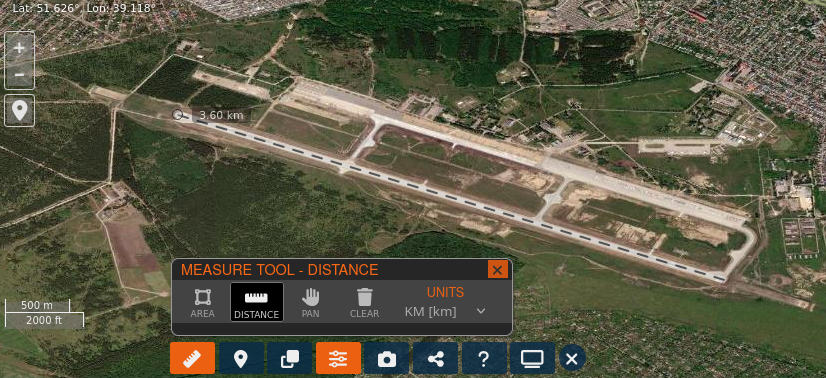
NASA's FIRMS shows runway 11/29 extended to 3.60 km

As of 2024 satellite imagery shows runway 11/29 extended to 3.60 km.

== History ==
Up until late 2009 it was the home of the 105th Composite Aviation Division and 455th Bomber Aviation Regiment, both with 16th Air Army/Special Purpose Command, the air forces command of the Moscow Military District. Following the air force reforms of 2009–10, it became the headquarters of the 7000th Air Base.

Warfare.ru says: "unit # 23326. 7000th Guard Borisov-Pomeransk Double Red Banner Order Suvorov Airbase. Address: 394055, Voronezh. ex 105 comb div + 455 bbr, 183, 47 recce, 89 attack rgts. Planned staff 2009: 24 Su-24M, 4 An-30, 1 Mi-8, ? 2 Su-34. 2010: 2 sqdn Su-24M, 1 sqdn Su-24MR, Mig-25RB + An-30. 20.10.2011 Su-24 crashed during landing in Amur distr, pilots dead."

The Natural Resources Defense Council listed it as a nuclear bomber base in a nuclear war study. However, no other sources on Long-Range Aviation list it as a bomber base.

On 9 November 2020 on the base a private allegedly killed an officer with an axe, used the officer's service pistol to fatally shoot two others and to wound a fourth before being detained. Accounts as to the background and motive include an altercation during an inspection, the suspect being beaten by his superiors and hazing.

== See also ==
- List of military airbases in Russia
