= Lipetsk air base =

Air base in Lipetsk Oblast, Russia

Lipetsk
- Lipetsk, Lipetsk Oblast in Russia
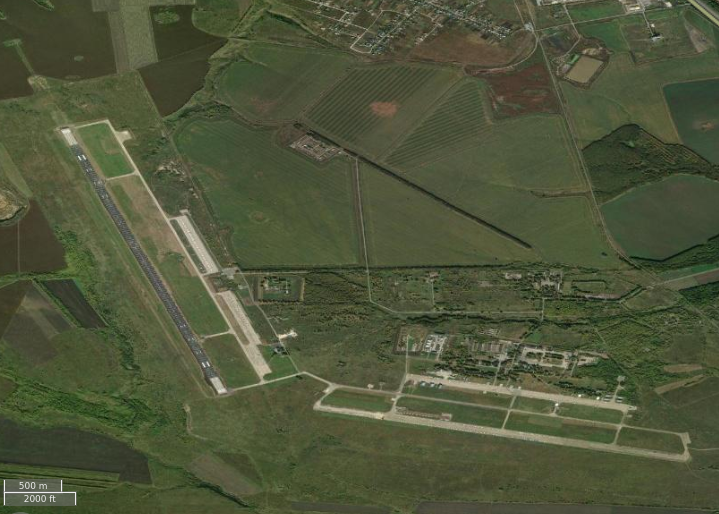
- Satellite imagery of Lipetsk air base

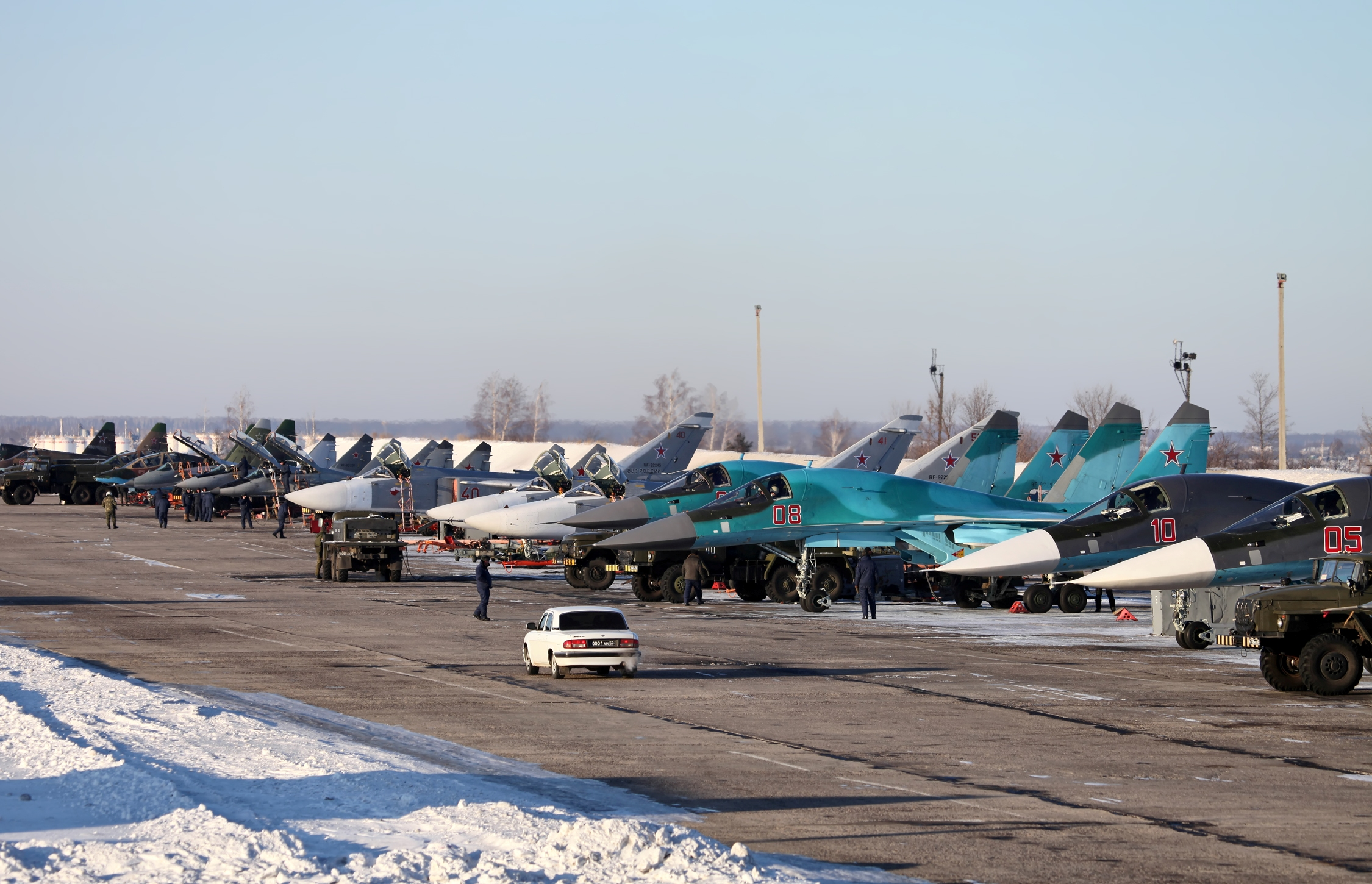
- Su-25SM, MiG-29UB, Su-24M2, Su-34 in 2012

Site information
- Type: Air Base
- Owner: Ministry of Defence
- Operator: Russian Aerospace Forces

Location
- Shown within Lipetsk Oblast Lipetsk (Russia)
- Coordinates: 52°38′6″N 39°26′42″E

Site history
- Built: 1960
- In use: 1960 - present

Airfield information
- Elevation: 194 metres (636 ft) AMSL
Runways
Direction	Length and surface
15/33	3,000 metres (9,843 ft) Concrete

Lipetsk Air Base (also given as Lipetskiy, Lipetsky, Lipetsk-2, Shakhm 10, and Lipetsk West) is an air base in Lipetsk Oblast, Russia located 12 km northwest of Lipetsk. It is the chief combat training center of the Russian Aerospace Forces, analogous to the United States Air Force's Nellis Air Force Base. The base is made up of two medium-sized airfields joined together.

The base is home to the 4th State Centre for Aircrew Training and Field Tests (4th GTsPAPVI), formerly the 4th Centre for Combat Application and Crew Training. Components of the 4th Centre include the 968th Instructor-Research Aviation Regiment (968th IISAP) and the 237th Air Force Display Centre of the Russian Air Force. I. N. Kozheduba - Russian Falcons.

== History ==
In 1925, the Soviet government allowed Weimar Republic Germany to open an air combat school at Lipetsk: Lipetsk fighter-pilot school. That permitted Germany to evade treaty restrictions on the development of military aviation, while the Soviet Air Forces received technical advice and access to test results. By 1933, the Soviets concluded that the arrangement was not worthwhile, and the new German government agreed (for different reasons). The school was closed.

The 4th Center of Combat Application and Conversion of Frontline Aviation, Russia's Top Gun school since around the 1960s, is the most well known unit on the base. Its chief, Col. Kharchevski, became famous after air combat exercises in the US and has become the personal pilot of President Putin.

From the 1960s to 1990, units stationed at Lipetsk include:

- 4th Centre for Combat Employment and Retraining of Personnel (4 TsBP i PLS)
- 760th Composite Training and Research Aviation Regiment (760 IISAP) flying 14 Mikoyan MiG-29E, 13 Sukhoi Su-17, 16 Sukhoi Su-25, and a number of Sukhoi Su-24, Sukhoi Su-27, and Mi-8 aircraft as of the early 1990s.
- 91st Training and Research Regiment (91 IIAP) flying Mikoyan-Gurevich MiG-23, 23 Mikoyan MiG-29, and 15 Sukhoi Su-27 aircraft as of the early 1990s

In 1992, the 968th Fighter Aviation Regiment arrived from Falkenberg in East Germany. It was flying Mikoyan-Gurevich MiG-23 and Mikoyan MiG-29 aircraft in the mid-1990s. In 1992-1993 it became first a Research-Instructor Fighter Aviation Regiment and then a Research-Instructor Mixed Aviation Regiment. Flying solely MiG-29s by 2004, it later also flew Sukhoi Su-24M aircraft.

=== Russo-Ukrainian War (2014/2022 – present) ===
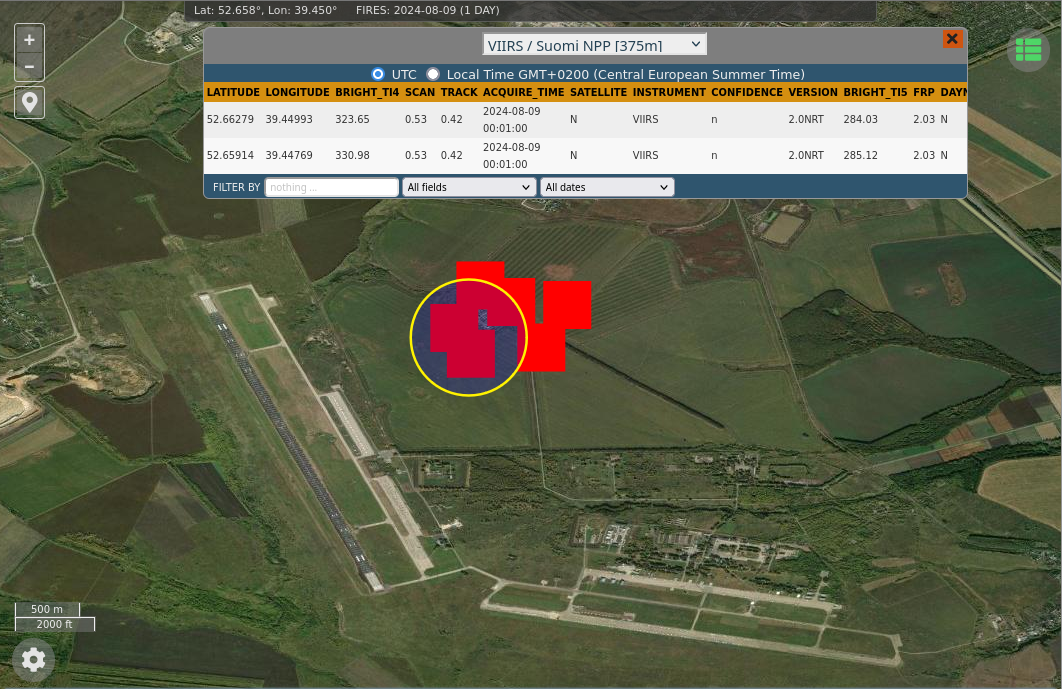
NASA's FIRMS detected extensive fire at a Lipetsk air base depot on 9 August 2024 00:01:00 (UTC)

On 8 August 2024, during the Russo-Ukrainian War, the airbase was struck by a large-scale Ukrainian drone attack that caused numerous explosions and fires. A warehouse containing guided aerial bombs and other facilities near the airbase were hit, with multiple sources of ignition resulting in a massive fire and multiple detonations, according to the Ukrainian general staff. Damage to the aircraft at the base was still being assessed the morning after the attack. The governor of Lipetsk reported detonations and said that six people had been injured. The fire at the air base facility was confirmed by NASA's FIRMS.

On 20 October 2024, the air base was attacked by Ukrainian drones with Ukrainian officials reporting that the attack was aimed at fuel, equipment and ammunition stored on the base.

According to information from the Main Directorate of Intelligence of Ukraine, on the night of 21 December 2025 an Su-30 and Su-27 were destroyed by long-distance drones on the base in an operation that had been planned for two weeks.

== Gallery ==
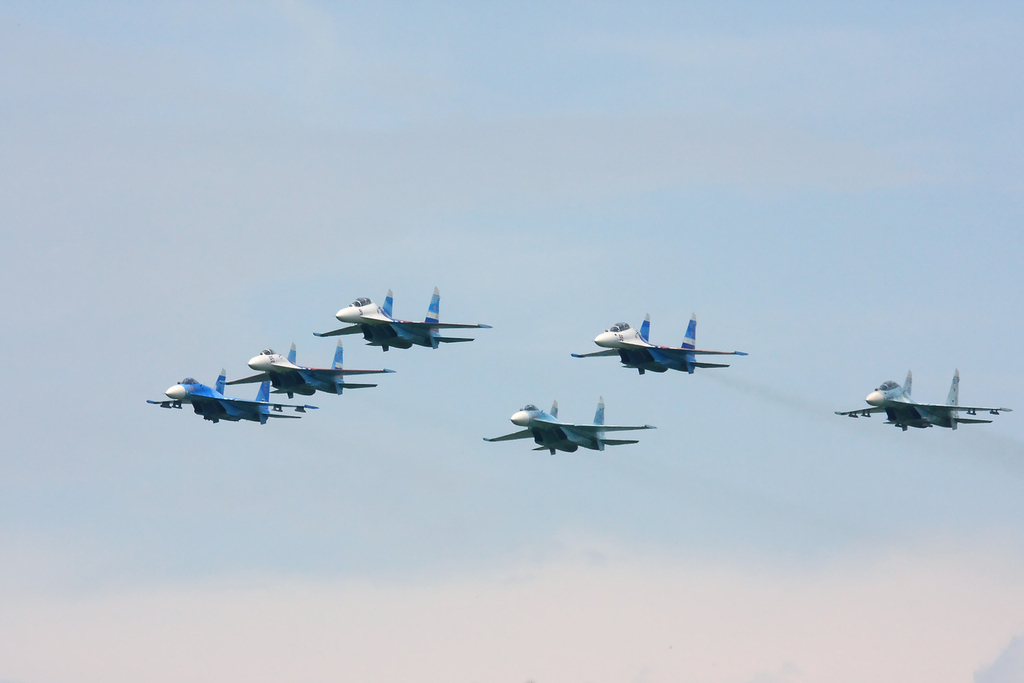
Falcons of Russia aerobatic team from Lipetsk Air Base

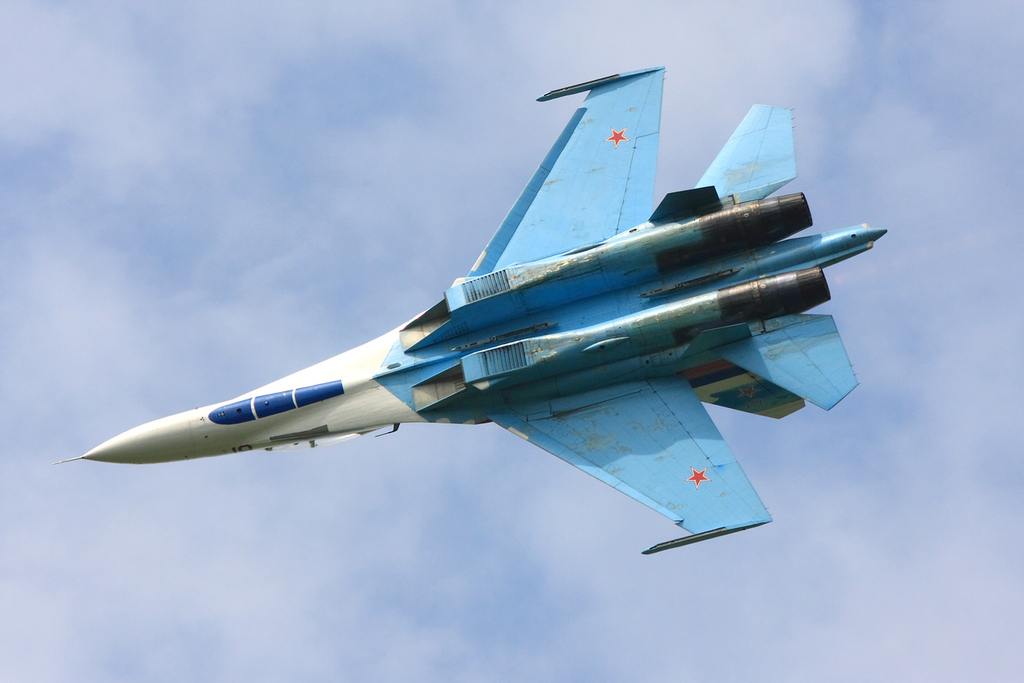
Falcons of Russia solo aerobatics during Tambov 2008 airshow

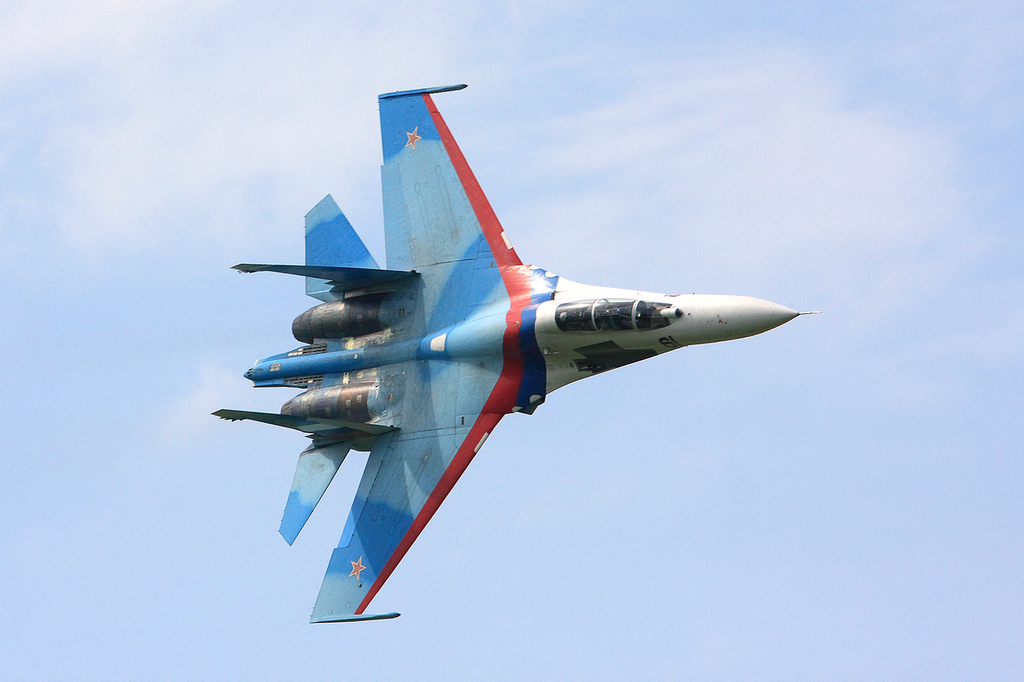
Falcons of Russia solo aerobatics during Tambov 2008 airshow

== See also ==
- List of military airbases in Russia
