= Chernigovka =

Chernigovka (Russian: Черниговка) is the name of several rural localities in Russia:

- Chernigovka, Arkharinsky District, Amur Oblast, a selo in Chernigovsky Rural Settlement of Arkharinsky District of Amur Oblast
- Chernigovka, Svobodnensky District, Amur Oblast, a selo in Zheltoyarovsky Rural Settlement of Svobodnensky District of Amur Oblast
- Chernigovka, Chishminsky District, Republic of Bashkortostan, a selo in Arovsky Selsoviet of Chishminsky District of the Republic of Bashkortostan
- Chernigovka, Davlekanovsky District, Republic of Bashkortostan, a village in Polyakovsky Selsoviet of Davlekanovsky District of the Republic of Bashkortostan
- Chernigovka, Ilansky District, Krasnoyarsk Krai, a village in Dalaysky Selsoviet of Ilansky District of Krasnoyarsk Krai
- Chernigovka, Karatuzsky District, Krasnoyarsk Krai, a village in Amylsky Selsoviet of Karatuzsky District of Krasnoyarsk Krai
- Chernigovka, Lipetsk Oblast, a selo in Rogozhinsky Selsoviet of Zadonsky District of Lipetsk Oblast
- Chernigovka, Chanovsky District, Novosibirsk Oblast, a village in Chanovsky District, Novosibirsk Oblast
- Chernigovka, Ust-Tarksky District, Novosibirsk Oblast, a village in Ust-Tarksky District, Novosibirsk Oblast
- Chernigovka, Kormilovsky District, Omsk Oblast, a selo in Chernigovsky Rural Okrug of Kormilovsky District of Omsk Oblast
- Chernigovka, Tavrichesky District, Omsk Oblast, a village in Leninsky Rural Okrug of Tavrichesky District of Omsk Oblast
- Chernigovka, Penza Oblast, a village in Zasechny Selsoviet of Mokshansky District of Penza Oblast
- Chernigovka, Primorsky Krai, a selo in Chernigovsky District of Primorsky Krai
- Chernigovka, Rostov Oblast, a khutor in Pervomayskoye Rural Settlement of Kasharsky District of Rostov Oblast
- Chernigovka, Vladimir Oblast, a village in Sudogodsky District of Vladimir Oblast
- Chernigovka (air base), a airbase in Primorsky Krai, Russia

== See also ==
- Chernihiv
