= List of corps and divisions of the Russian Air Force =

This is an incomplete list of corps and Aviation Divisions of the Russian Air Force and Russian Air Defence Force (PVO) active from 1992 to the present.

Corps/Division	Type	Headquarters	Formation	Equipment	Remarks
1st Air Defence Corps	KPVO	Balashikha	16th Air Army	surface-to-air missiles only	
1st Air Defense Division	dPVO	Severomorsk	45th Air and Air Defense Army		
1st Guards Composite Aviation Division	SAD	Krasnodar	4th Air Army	Su-24/Su-25/L-39	Disbanded 2009
2nd Air Defense Division	dPVO				
3rd Air Defense Division	dPVO		45th Air and Air Defense Army		
4th Air Defense Division	dPVO				
5th Air Defense Division	dPVO				
7th Air Defence Division	dPVO	Kursk	Moscow Order of Lenin Air Defence District	Fighters, radars, SAMs	1994 Reorganization of the 7th Air Defence Corps, Disbanded 1998
8th Special Purpose Aviation Division	ADON	Chkalovsky Airport, Moscow Oblast	HQ VVS	transport aircraft	
5th Separate Air Defence Corps		Urals	HQ VVS		Redesignation of 4th Independent Air Defence Army, 1994. Amalgamated into 5th Army of VVS and PVO, 1998.
8th Air Defence Corps	KPVO	Komsomolsk-na-Amure	11th Independent Air Defence Army	Fighters, radars, SAMs	2001 renamed 25th Air Defence Division; 2009 11th Aerospace Defence Brigade.
9th Fighter Aviation Division	IAD	Kubinka (air base)	Air Forces of the Moscow Military District	Fighters	Activated 1 February 1951. Disbanded 1993.
9th Air Defence Division	dPVO	Moscow Military District	1st Air Defence Corps	Surface to air missiles	May include S-400 units
12th Military Transport Aviation Division	VTAD	Migalovo	61st Air Army	Il-76/An-22/An-124	
16th Guards Fighter Aviation Division	IAD	Millerovo	4th Air Army	Fighters - arrived from GSFG 1993	
19th Air Defence Corps	KPVO	Chelyabinsk	4th Independent Air Defence Army	Fighters, radars, SAMs	Disbanded 1994
20th Air Defence Corps	KPVO	Perm	4th Air Defence Army		Disbanded 1994.
21st Air Defence Corps	KPVO	Severomorsk	6th Air Army	SAMs, radars, Su-27/MiG-31	2009 renamed 1st Aerospace Defence Brigade.
21st Mixed Aviation Division	SAD	Dzhida	14th Air Army	Su-24M/Su-25/Su-24MR	
22nd Guards Heavy Bomber Aviation Division	TBAD	Engels-2, Engels	37th Air Army	Tu-22M3/Tu-95MS/Tu-160	
22nd Air Defence Corps	KPVO	Arkhangelsk	10th Independent Air Defence Army	1993 renamed 22 AD Corps; 1994 renamed 22 AD Div.	Disbanded 1.5.02.
23rd Air Defence Corps	KPVO	Vladivostok	11th Independent Air Defence Army	Su-27/MiG-25PU/MiG-31	2001 renamed 93rd ADD; 2009 renamed 12th Aerospace Defence Brigade.
22nd Guards Air Defense Division	dPVO				
25th Air Defence Division	dPVO	Komsomolsk-on-Amur	11th Air and Air Defense Army	Su-27	
26th Guards Air Defence Division	dPVO	Chita	11th Air and Air Defense Army		
28th Air Defense Division	dPVO				Created in 1963 on the basis of the former 25h Air Defense Corps, disbanded in 1998. Reformed as 76th Air Defense Division
31st Air Defense Division	dPVO				
32nd Air Defense Division	dPVO	Rzhev	6th Air and Air Defense Army		
32nd Air Defence Corps	KPVO	Rzhev	Special Purpose Command	Su-27/MiG-31/MiG-25U	Renamed 32nd Air Defense Division
38th Air Defence Corps	KPVO	Novosibirsk	14th Independent Air Defence Army	Fighters, SAMs, radars	1994 renamed 41st Air Defence Division
41st Air Defense Division	dPVO				
44th Air Defense Division	dPVO				
50th Guards Air Defence Corps	KPVO	Atamanovka, Chita Oblast	14th Independent Air Defence Army		1.12.98 renamed 26th Guards ADD; 2009 renamed 10th Gds Aerospace Defence Brigade.
51st Air Defence Corps	KPVO	Rostov on Don	4th Air Army	Su-27/MiG-29	1992 renamed 51st Air Defence Corps. Also SAMs, radars
51st Air Defense Division	dPVO	Novocherkassk	4th Air and Air Defense Army		
54th Air Defence Corps	KPVO	Taytsy, Leningrad Oblast	6th Air Army	Su-27	2009 renamed 2nd Aerospace Defence Brigade.
56th Air Defence Corps	KPVO	Semipalatinsk	14 OA PVO	Fighters, SAMs, radars	Disbanded 1994.
72nd Air Defence Corps	KPVO	Petropavlovsk-Kamchatka	11 OA PVO	Fighters, SAMs, radars	1990 merger of 6 and 24 Air Defence Divisions; August 1994 renamed 6th Air Defence Division. May 1998 renamed VVS and PVO OKVS (VVS and PVO Northeast Russian Federation).
76th Air Defense Division	dPVO	Samara	14th Air and Air Defense Army		
93rd Air Defense Division	dPVO	Vladivostok	11th Air and Air Defense Army		
94th Air Defence Division	KPVO	Irkutsk	14th Independent Air Defence Army	Fighters, SAMs, radars	Fmr 39 ADC (2/88). 1998 merged with 50th Gds ADC, became 26 Gds ADD.
105th Composite Aviation Division	SAD	Voronezh	Special Purpose Command	Su-24/Su-25	
149th Mixed Aviation Division	SAD	Smuravyevo	76th Air Army	Su-24	Disbanded 1998
303rd Mixed Aviation Division		Khurba	11th Air and Air Defense Army	Mig-31, SU-35, SU-34	
326th Heavy Bomber Aviation Division	TBAD	Ukrainka	37th Air Army	Tu-22M3/MR, Tu-95MS	

== Index of abbreviations ==
- дПВО (dPVO) - Air Defence Division (Diviziya Protivo-Vozdushnaya Oborona)
- KPVO - Air Defence Corps (Korpus Protivo-Vozdushnaya Oborona)
- OA PVO - Independent Army of the Air Defence Forces
- SAD - Composite Aviation Division (Smeshannaya Aviatsionnaya Diviziya)
- TBAD - Heavy Bomber Aviation Division (Tiazholaya Bombardirovochnaya Aviatsionnaya Diviziya)
- VTAD - Military Transport Aviation Division (Voyenno-Transportnaya Aviatsionnaya Diviziya)
