= 18th Guards Assault Aviation Regiment =

- 18-й гвардейский штурмовой авиационный полк
- Active: 19 June 1938 - present
- Country: Soviet Union (until 1991); Russia
- Branch: Soviet Air Forces (until 1991); Russian Air Force
- Type: Attack aircraft
- Role: Ground Attack
- Size: Regiment
- Part of: 303rd Composite Aviation Division
- Garrison/HQ: Chernigovka Air Base
- Engagements: World War II; Korean War; Syrian Civil War
- Decorations: Guards; Order of the Red Banner; Order of Suvorov; Order of the Legion of Honour
- Honorifics: Vitebsk; Normandie-Niemen

Commanders
- Notable commanders: Vladimir Balandin; Vasily Barsukov; Anatoly Golubov; Nikolai Danilenko; Nikolai Pinchuk; Vasily Seregin; Semyon Sibirin; Yevgeny Stelmakh; Alexander Smorchkov; Lev Shchukin; Roman Filipov; Yevgeny Osipov

Insignia
- Identification symbol

Aircraft flown
- Attack: Su-25SM
- Trainer: Su-25UB

The 18th Guards Assault Aviation Vitebsk twice Red Banner, the Order of Suvorov and the French Cross of the Order of the Legion of Honor Regiment "Normandie-Niemen" (18-й гвардейский штурмовой авиационный полк; 18th Guards ShAP) was a military unit of the Soviet Air Forces. It is now part of the Russian Aerospace Forces.

The regiment was originally formed as the 6th Fighter Aviation Regiment on 19 June 1938.

It was originally organised from the 6th Fighter Aviation Regiment between 28 February and 15 May 1942 as in the Siberian Military District. It was given the status of a Guards unit in accordance with a Prikaz of the NKO, No. 70 оf 07.03.1942. It fought in the Great Patriotic War, winning fame in France as it incorporated the Normandie-Niemen Free French flyers, and in the Korean War, later entering the Armed Forces of the Russian Federation. From March 1952 it was based at Galenki, Primorskiy Krai [44 05 49N, 131 48 12E] in the Russian Far East.

Its most recent form dates from March 1993 when it was reorganised as a штурмовой (literally "ground attack") unit, Military Unit Number 21806, being previously equipped with the Mikoyan-Gurevich MiG-27 "Flogger." During the 1990s and 2000s it was part of the 11th Air and Air Defence Forces Army.

In 2019 it was reported as including two squadrons of Sukhoi Su-25 "Frogfoot."

== History ==
=== Soviet Union ===
The 6th Fighter Aviation Regiment was formed on 19 June 1938 in Khabarovsk as a component of the Special Far Eastern Army and later the Far Eastern Front. By 1941 the regiment consisted of four squadrons armed with Polikarpov I-16 and Polikarpov I-15bis fighters.

==== World War II ====
With the start of the German invasion of the Soviet Union, the regiment began moving west. On 20 July 1941, the regiment consisting of 64 aircraft reached Borisoglebsk, where it was divided into the 6th Fighter Aviation Regiment of the Northwestern Front and the 6th Fighter Aviation Regiment of the Southwestern Front. The 6th IAP of the Northwestern Front departed for combat in the Novgorod direction. In August 1941, the regiment saw combat in the northwestern direction. The regiment operated in the direction of Novgorod, Staraya Russa and Demyansk until 8 February 1942 when it was withdrawn to the 5th Reserve Brigade in Novosibirsk for reorganisation with the Yak-7 and Yak-1. Over its period of combat, the regiment carried out 4,420 combat missions, took part in 217 battles, shot down 61 aircraft and destroyed 6 on the ground.

On 17 March 1942, the regiment was reorganised as the 18th Guards Fighter Aviation Regiment. Having been reformed and rearmed, the regiment arrived at Ramenskoye near Moscow on 1 June, where it was attached to the 1st Air Army. The regiment saw combat in the Kozelsk and Rzhev direction, carrying out 1,735 sorties. Amidst heavy losses in August 1942, the regiment was withdrawn to the rear once more. From 24 August 1942 to 22 February 1943, the regiment did not conduct combat operations while reforming, while remaining part of the 234th Fighter Aviation Division.

From 22 February 1943 the regiment was attached to the newly formed 303rd Fighter Aviation Division, equipped with Yak-7 and Yak-1 fighters. This included 10 Yak-7b aircraft built with funds from workers of Soviet Latvia, as well as soldiers of the Latvian Rifle Division. These aircraft were marked "Latviesu strelnieks" meaning Latvian Riflemen.

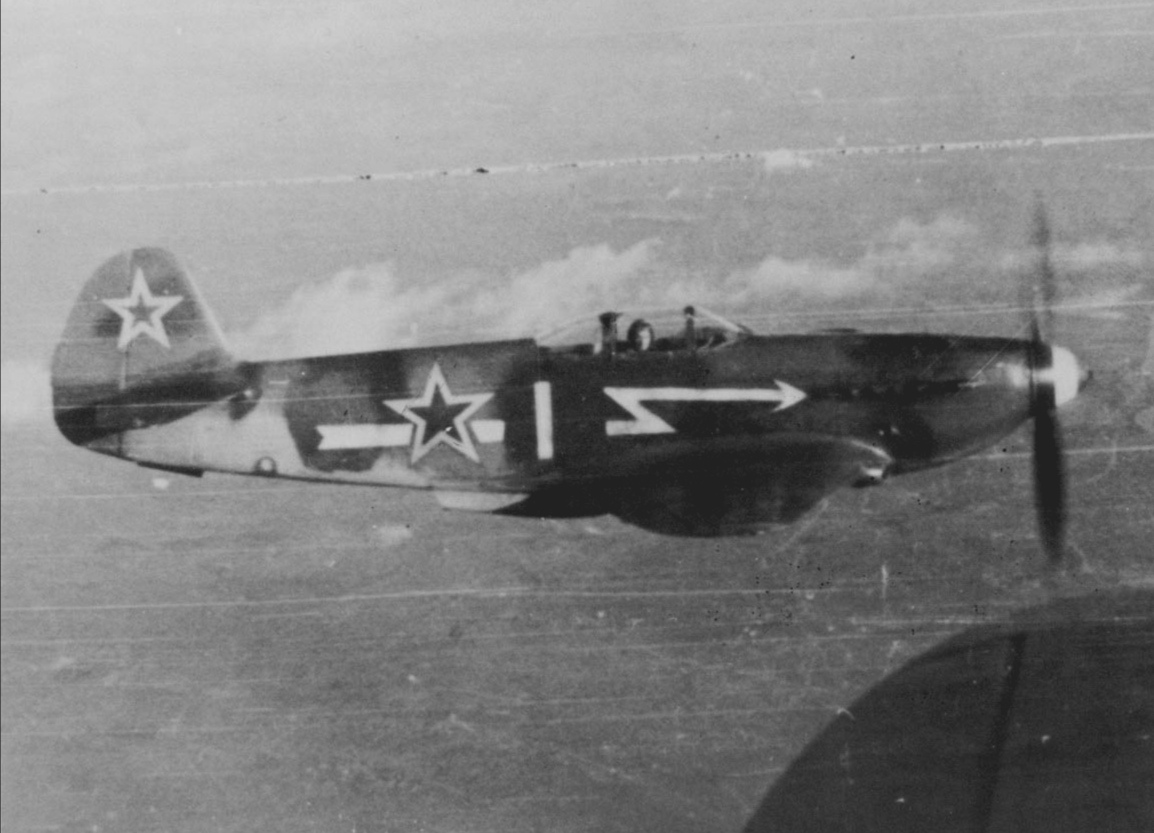
French Ace Roger Sauvage with his Yak-3, 1945

With the War in Europe over, a decree by Joseph Stalin in June 1945 stated that the Normandie-Niemen Squadron could return to France with their 38 Yak-3 aircraft. On 20 June 1945, the squadron arrived at Paris–Le Bourget Airport, and their aircraft paraded down the Champs-Élysées. Soviet Chief Marshal Alexander Novikov wrote,

The gift of the Regiment Normandie-Niémen of all the aircraft on which they flew demonstrated the sincere friendship between the French and Soviet people ... In giving the pilots of Normandie-Nièmen the honour of keeping their arms and allowing them to return to their homeland on their combat aircraft, the Soviet Union offered them the highest compensation.

In July 1945 the regiment left its base in Kobrin, Belarus for the Far East to take part in the Manchurian Strategic Offensive Operation against Japan. The regiment was involved in the capture of Harbin, Port Arthur and Dalian. Following the Surrender of Japan, the regiment returned to Kobrin.

Due to the short service like of the Yak-3, the regiment received a batch of Yak-9 fighters in late 1945.

Combat statistics for the 18th GvIAP during the Great Patriotic War
Combat Missions	Air-to-air kills	Enemy aircraft destroyed	Friendly aircraft losses	Total friendly KIA	Friendly KIA (Air-to-air)	Friendly KIA (Anti-air)	Friendly KIC	Friendly MIA
12,704	407	427	99	73	28	6	12	27

For outstanding service during the war, the following pilots were awarded the title of Hero of the Soviet Union:
- Anatoly Golubov
- Vasily Barsukov
- Vladimir Balandin†
- Nikolai Danilenko
- Nikolai Pinchuk
- Semyon Sibirin
- Vasily Seregin

In 1948 the 303rd Fighter Aviation Division was transferred to the Soviet Air Defence Forces. The regiment was temporarily re-equipped with Yakovlev Yak-9 fighters, before receiving the Mikoyan-Gurevich MiG-9 turbojet fighter.

==== Korean War ====
In 1950, the 18th Guards Fighter Aviation Regiment at Dyatkovo were among the first in the Soviet Air Forces to receive the transonic Mikoyan-Gurevich MiG-15 fighter jet. In 1951 the regiment deployed to Mukden (now known as Shenyang) in China to support forces of the Korean People's Army during the Korean War. On 18 May 1951 the regiment would be forward deployed in order to reinforce the 324th Fighter Aviation Division.

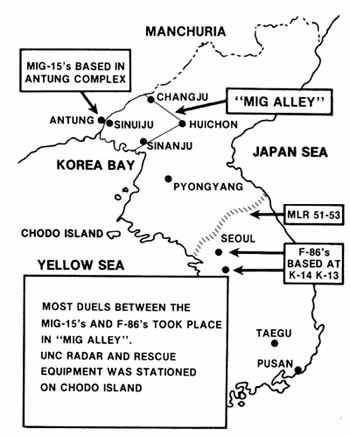
MiG Alley

On 1 June 1951, Yevgeny Stelmakh shot down one B-29 Superfortress and damaged another. After the engagement, Stelmakh was himself shot down by either a B-29 gunner or an F-86 and was forced to eject. After landing in what he mistakenly believed was enemy territory, Stelmakh shot himself. His body was retrieved by friendly forces and was buried in the Russian cemetery in Lüshun (now Dalian, China).

On 1 June 1951, Lev Shchukin shot down a USAF F-51D over MiG Alley. A few days later on 6 June, Shchukin downed a F-80 Shooting Star near Sonchon. On 17 June, Shchukin was downed after shooting down a F-86 Sabre, returning to service two months later after being rescued by Chinese forces. On 29 August Shchukin severely damaged an RAAF Gloster Meteor over Chongju. During a battle alongside Alexander Smorchkov, another F-80 piloted by Lewis Pleiss was downed. In October 1951, Shchukin is credited with damaging or destroying an F-86, F-80, F-84, Meteor and an RF-80. After being shot down on 11 January 1952, Shchukin was rescued by a nearby Soviet anti-aircraft crew. In total Shchukin flew 121 sorties and was credited with at least 15 solo victories.

On 22 October 1951 a USAF B-29 Superfortress of the 19th Bomb Wing was shot down near Seoul by Alexander Smorchkov flying a MiG-15. In the same engagement, Smorchkov additionally engaged a F-84 Thunderjet. In total, Smorchkov made 150 combat missions and was credited with at least 13 solo victories.

Stelmakh (posthumous), Shchukin and Smorchkov were awarded the title of Hero of the Soviet Union.

Combat statistics for the 18th GvIAP during the Korean War
Combat missions	Air battles	Enemy fighter kills	Enemy bomber kills	Enemy fighter-bomber kills	Total enemy aircraft losses	Friendly aircraft losses	Friendly KIA
4,304	105	49	8	39	96	18	8

In 1952, the regiment returned from China, being relocated to Galenki in Primorye, where it would remain until 2009. The following year, it would be re-equipped with the Mikoyan-Gurevich MiG-17. In 1959 the regiment would be redesignated the 18th Guards Fighter-Bomber Aviation Regiment. However, this would be short lived, as it was again renamed the 18th Guards Fighter Aviation Regiment a year later.

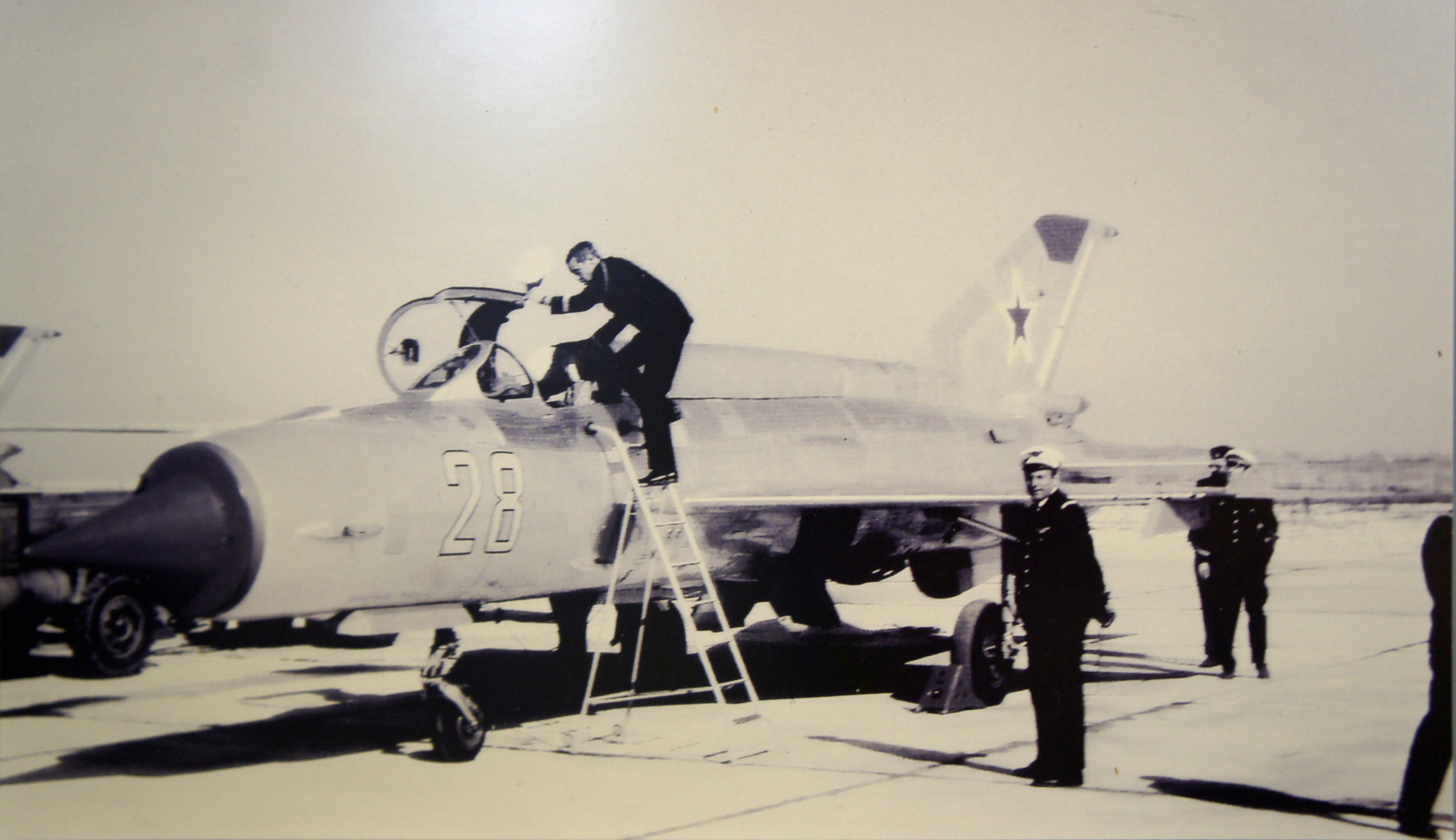
Mikoyan-Gurevich MiG-21

In 1966, the regiments now outdated MiG-17s were replaced with the new Mikoyan-Gurevich MiG-21. These were later supplemented by upgraded variants of the aircraft.

In 1981, while still operating the MiG-21, the unit was redesignated as the 18th Guards Fighter-Bomber Aviation Regiment. In 1989, the regiment began conversion training for the Mikoyan MiG-27 (MiG-27K/D/M). The aircraft were equipped with the characteristic Normandy lions and lightning bolt.

=== Russian Federation ===
In 1993, following the Dissolution of the Soviet Union, the vast Soviet Armed Forces no longer possessed the ability to maintain its predecessors large standing formations. On 1 July 1993 the Air Force decreed that single-engine attack aircraft such as the MiG-27 were to be phased out. The regiment at Galenki replaced its Mikoyan MiG-27's with the Sukhoi Su-25.

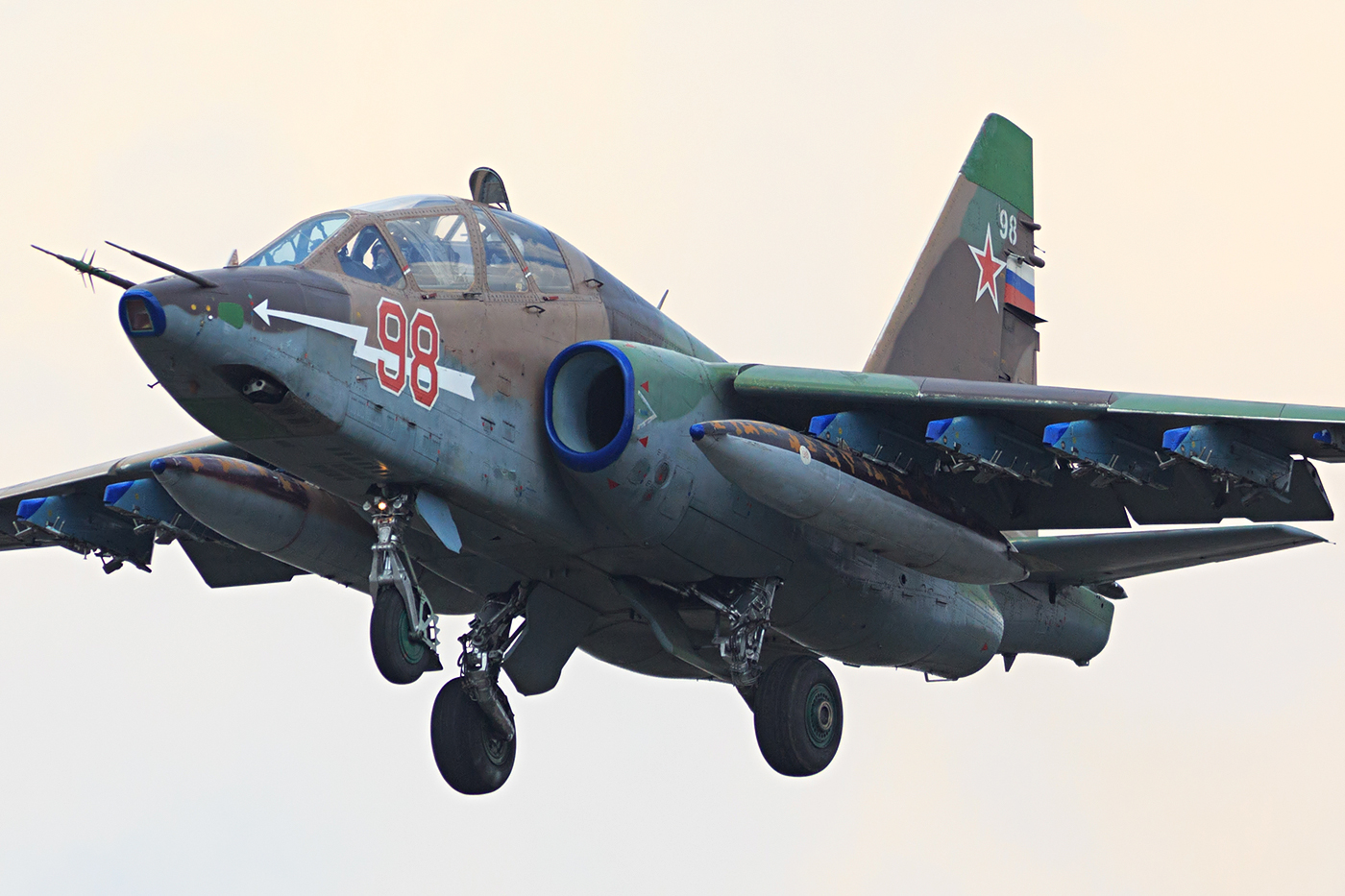
Su-25UB with characteristic "lightning bolt" paint scheme

In line with the change in aircraft, the regiment was renamed the 18th Assault Aviation Regiment. In 1995, the regiment was awarded the honorific "Normandie-Niemen", with increased cooperation between Russia and France. For the first time, a French delegation visited Galenki in 1994. 18 ShAP became a separate regiment following the disbandment of the 303rd Fighter Aviation Division.

However, amid the turmoil of the 1990s, the regiment would only be operational in 1998.

In December 2005 the President of France Jacques Chirac formally awarded the Legion of Honour to the regiment. In 2006 a memorial was unveiled at the Musée de l'air et de l'espace in Le Bourget by leaders Jacques Chirac and Vladimir Putin.

==== Disbandment ====
In line with the 2008 Russian military reforms, the regiment was disbanded on 11 November 2009, with its remaining assets alongside the 187th Assault Aviation Regiment transferred to the 6983rd Guards Aviation Base at Galenki.

==== Reactivation ====
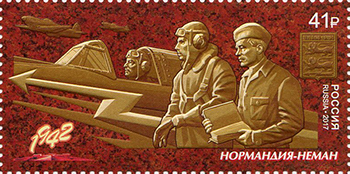
Stamp commemorating the 75th anniversary of the regiment, 2017

On 1 December 2013, the regiment was reactivated as the 18th Assault Aviation Regiment based in Chernigovka as part of the 303rd Composite Aviation Division, 11th Air and Air Defence Forces Army. On 7 February 2014, the regiments honorific of "Normandie-Niemen" was restored. The regiment was equipped with modernised Sukhoi Su-25SM attack aircraft, bearing camouflage and marking of the 121st Aviation Repair Plant.

In 2014 the regiment took part in the joint Shanghai Cooperation Organisation Peace Mission 2014 military exercise at the Zhurihe Training Base in China. In September, dispersal exercises were also carried out, with flights taking place from highways in Primorsky Krai. Later in the month, the regiment was deployed to Sakhalin to take part in Vostok-2014.

In 2015, in commemoration of the 70th anniversary of Victory in the Great Patriotic War, the awards and honorary titles of the unit were restored, gaining the full title of the 18th Guards Assault Aviation Vitebsk twice Red Banner, the Order of Suvorov and the French Cross of the Order of the Legion of Honor Regiment "Normandie-Niemen".

==== Syria ====
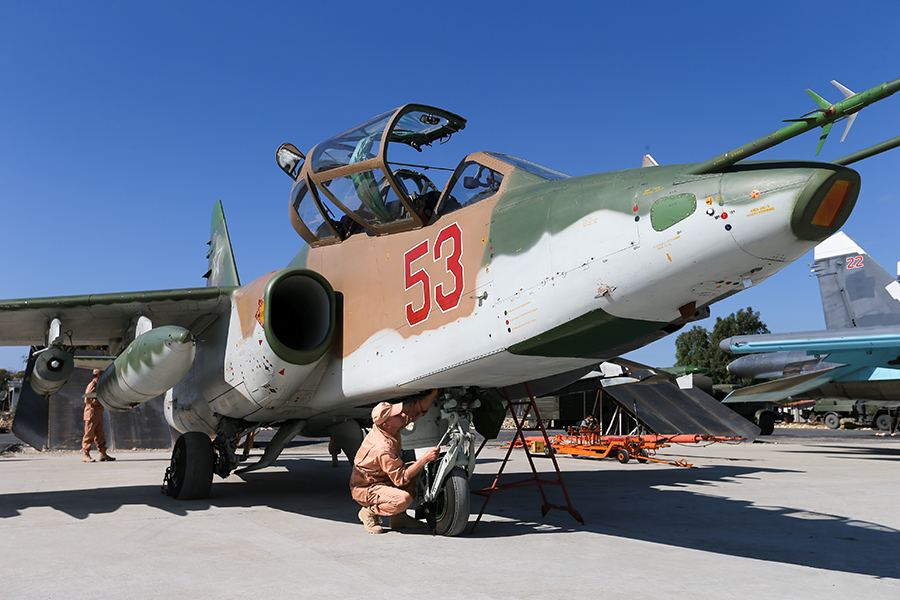
Sukhoi Su-25SM of the 18th Assault Aviation Regiment at Khmeimim Air Base, Syria

In September 2015, several aircraft of the 18th Assault Aviation Regiment were deployed to the newly constructed Russian air base at Khmeimim, located on the grounds of Bassel al-Assad International Airport in Latakia as part of the Russian intervention force. In January 2016, the first joint missions took place, consisting of Syrian Air Force MiG-29 fighter jets, and Russian Air Force Su-25 ground attack aircraft. In March 2016, Su-25 aircraft of the 18th and 960th ShAP supported ground forces during the Palmyra offensive, successfully capturing the ancient city of Palmyra from the Islamic State. The aircraft were used once more during the Syrian Army push to relieve the besieged city of Deir ez-Zor, with aircraft forward deployed to the T-4 air base in 2017. Aircraft were employed in both "free-hunting" combat sorties in more isolated segments of the Syrian desert with significant presence of the Islamic State, or were guided by ground based forward air controllers for guided close air support.

Aircraft of the regiment based from Khmeimim Air Base provided air support for the Syrian Armed Forces during the Northwestern Syria campaign (October 2017 – February 2018) against forces of the Islamic State (IS) as well as Hay'at Tahrir al-Sham (HTS). The offensive, which initially began as a response to an offensive started by the Islamic State, operations were focused on northeastern Hama, southeastern Idlib, and southwestern Aleppo governorates, allowing Syria to regain substantial territory and strategic assets such as Abu ad Duhur Air Base.

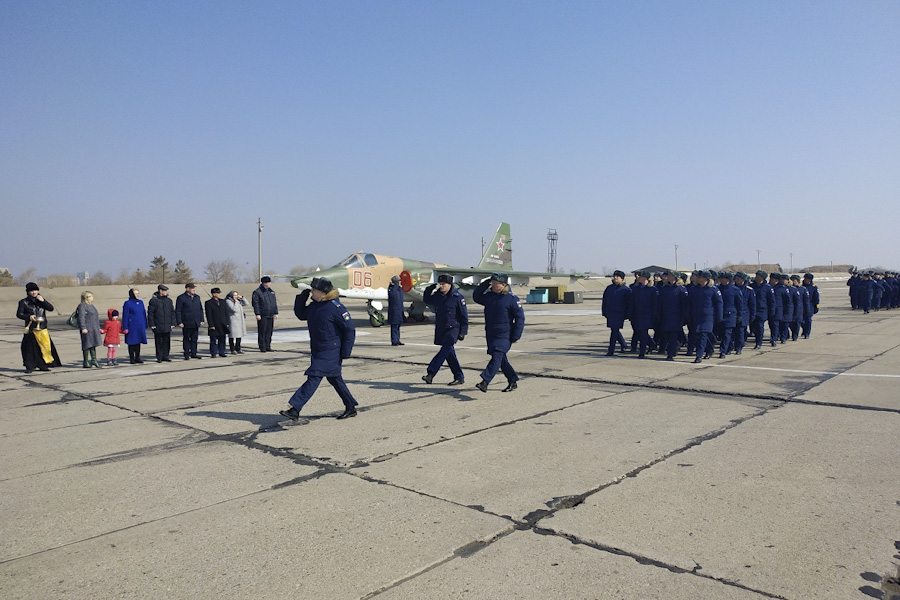
Su-25SM named after Hero of the Russian Federation Roman Filipov at Chernigovka Air Base.

On 3 February 2018, while supporting operations in the vicinity of Idlib, a Su-25 piloted by Roman Filipov was shot down by jihadist forces of Hay'at Tahrir al-Sham near Saraqib, by either a heavy caliber anti-aircraft gun or a man-portable air defence system. Filipov was able to successfully eject from the aircraft, but was surrounded by rebel forces. A gun battle ensued, with Filipov firing back at the attackers with a Stechkin pistol, with his wingman providing support from the air. However, after being surrounded, Filipov blew himself up using a grenade. On the same day, Russian forces retaliated by firing Kalibr missiles targeting rebel positions in Idlib province responsible for the downing, killing at least 30 rebel fighters. The body of Filipov was subsequently repatriated by Spetznaz and Syrian special forces units. Filipov was posthumously awarded the title of Hero of the Russian Federation.

== Lineage ==
=== Aircraft ===
- Mikoyan-Gurevich MiG-9, 1948–1950
- Mikoyan-Gurevich MiG-15, 1950–1953
- Mikoyan-Gurevich MiG-17, 1953–1966
- Mikoyan-Gurevich MiG-21, 1966–1989
- Mikoyan-Gurevich MiG-27, 1989–1993
- Sukhoi Su-25, 1993–2009
- Sukhoi Su-25SM, 2013-present
