= 11th Air and Air Defence Forces Army =

- Great emblem
- Active: 1998–2009; 2015–present
- Country: Russia
- Branch: Russian Aerospace Forces
- Part of: Main Command of the Russian Aerospace Forces and Eastern Military District
- HQ: Khabarovsk
- Decorations: Order of the Red Banner

Commanders
- Current commander: Major General Vladimir Tikhonov

The 11th Red Banner Air and Air Defence Forces Army (Russian: 11-я Краснознамённая армия ВВС и ПВО) is a formation of the Russian Aerospace Forces, located in the Russian Far East, whose zone of responsibility covers the Eastern Military District. The 11th Army Air Force and Air Defense Army was reformed within the Eastern Military District on 14 August 2015.

The designation "11" for an aviation formation of this size in the Far East was introduced during the Second World War. In August 1942 the Air Forces of the 2nd Red Banner Army were redesignated the 11th Air Army. But this formation only last less than two and a half years, because in December 1944 the formation was reduced to the 18th Aviation Corps, which in June 1945 joined the 10th Air Army.

In April 1960 the designation "11" was taken up again by redesignation of the independent Far Eastern Air Defence Army. For decades thus the aviation forces in the area consisted of the 1st Air Army of the Air Forces, reformed on 1 July 1957 by merger of two existing armies when the higher command arrangements in the Far East were reorganised, and the 11th Air Defence Army of the Soviet Air Defence Forces. In 1998, six years after the fall of the Soviet Union, the two were merged into the 11th Air and Air Defence Forces Army, covering the Far Eastern Military District. Russian Naval Aviation also handed over a regiment of Mikoyan MiG-31 interceptor aircraft on the Kamchatka Peninsula which was included in the new force.

The 11th Army of VVS and PVO was disbanded in 2009 by being redesignated the 3rd Air and Air Defence Forces Command. The army was reformed once again in 2015 from the command.

== 11th Independent Army of the Air Defence Forces ==
The army traces its lineage back to the formation of the Far Eastern Air Defence Zone on 11 August 1941. The zone was broken up in spring 1945 to form the Priamur and Primorsky Air Defence Armies. Postwar, in October, the Priamur Air Defense Army was renamed the Far Eastern Air Defence Army, and soon reorganized as the Far Eastern Air Defense District (okrug PVO) in 1946. The Far Eastern Air Defence District took over responsibility for air defence east of Lake Baikal, including the old sector of the Primorsky Air Defence Army. In a February 1949 reorganization, the Far Eastern Air Defense District (raion PVO) was formed as a raion of the 1st (okrug) category, and the headquarters of the former Far Eastern Air Defence District became that of the Komsomolsk-Khabarovsk Air Defense District (raion PVO). The Amur Air Defence Army, headquartered at Khabarovsk, was formed in December 1954 during PVO restructuring from the Komsomolsk-Khabarovsk Air Defense District and the 50th Fighter Aviation Corps PVO, merging anti-aircraft and interceptor units. The army was reorganized as the Independent Far Eastern Air Defence Army in December 1956, its responsibilities expanded with the takeover of air defense units previously under naval control. The army was numbered in March 1960 as the 11th Independent Air Defence Army (or 11th Army of the Air Defence Forces (11 OA PVO). The army was awarded the Order of the Red Banner on 30 April 1975. Under the Ogarkov reforms, the army headquarters was disbanded in May 1980 and its units placed under the air force and air defence forces of the Far Eastern Military District. These changes were reversed in May 1986 and the army headquarters reformed, receiving a new battle flag.

During the Soviet period, the 11th Air Defence Army gained headlines due to the defection of Viktor Belenko in September 1976, and the KAL 007 shootdown in 1983. The KAL 007 shootdown occurred on 1 September 1983. After a protracted ground-controlled interception, three Su-15 fighters from Dolinsk-Sokol airbase and a MiG-23 from Smirnykh Air Base managed to make visual contact with the Boeing 747 and later shot it down.

In the late 1980s the 11th Independent Air Defence Army of the Voyska PVO, controlled two corps (23rd in Vladivostok & 8th in Komsomolsk) and four divisions (24th in Petropavlovsk, 29th in Blagoveshchensk, 6th in Okhotsk, and 25th in Chukotka) with 12 fighter aviation regiments (IAPs), 19 SAM brigades and regiments and ten radio-technical (radar) brigades/regiments. The army underwent dramatic reductions during the 1990s, leaving it with only the 8th and 23rd Air Defence Corps. A 1990 reorganization eliminated the 24th and 25th Air Defence Division headquarters, with the units in Sakhalin and Chukotka coming directly under the 72nd Air Defence Corps, formed from the 6th Air Defence Division in Kamchatka. The corps reverted to the 6th Air Defense Division in 1994 when the last Chukotka air defense units were eliminated. The 29th Air Defence Division was eliminated in 1994. By mid-1998, the 6th Air Defence Division was abolished after the last units in Sakhalin disbanded and its units became part of the new Aviation and Air Defence of the Joint Command of Troops and Forces in Northeast Russia.

In 2001 the 8th and 23rd Air Defence Corps were renamed the 25th and 93rd Air Defence Divisions, respectively, and in 2009 became the 11th and 12th Aerospace Defence Brigades.

24th Air Defence Division was activated 5.60 in Yuzhno-Sakhalinsk (Khomutovo), Sakhalin Oblast.

=== 23rd Air Defence Corps 1988 ===
HQ Vladivostok

- 22nd Guards Fighter Aviation Regiment PVO (Tsentralnaya Uglovaya, Primorskiy Kray)(Uglovaya/Tsentralnye| Угловое - Russian Airfield Index)(http://eagle-rost.livejournal.com/310734.html)
- 47th Fighter Aviation Regiment PVO (Zolotaya Dolina (Unashi), Primorskiy Kray) (disbanded 1998)
- 530th Fighter Aviation Regiment PVO (Chuguevka, Primorskiy Kray)
- 821st Fighter Aviation Regiment PVO (Spassk-Dalny, Primorskiy Kray) (disbanded 1994)
- 130th Anti-Aircraft Missile Brigade (Vladivostok, Primorskiy Kray)
- 150th Anti-Aircraft Missile Brigade (Zolotaya Dolina (Unashi), Primorskiy Kray)
- 267th Anti-Aircraft Missile Brigade (Filino, Primorskiy Kray)
- 639th Anti-Aircraft Missile Regiment (Vasilevka, Primorskiy Kray)
- 749th Anti-Aircraft Missile Regiment (Timofeevka, Primorskiy Kray)
- 1133rd Anti-Aircraft Missile Regiment (Lipovtsy, Primorskiy Kray)
- 10th Radio-Technical Brigade (Artem, Primorskiy Kray)
- 123rd Radio-Technical Regiment (Timofeevka, Primorskiy Kray)

=== 6th Air Defence Division 1988 ===
HQ Petropavlovsk-Kamchatsky, Kamchatka Oblast

- 865th Fighter Aviation Regiment PVO (Petropavlovsk-Kamchatsky Airport (Yelizovo), Kamchatka Oblast)
- 191st Anti-Aircraft Missile Brigade (Petropavlovsk-Kamchatka, Kamchatka Oblast)
- 60th Radio-Technical Regiment (Koryaki, Kamchatka Oblast)
- 124th Radio-Technical Regiment (Ust-Kamchatsk, Kamchatka Oblast)

Formed from 222nd Fighter Aviation Division PVO May 1960; disbanded 1998.

=== 24th Air Defence Division 1988 ===
HQ Yuzhno-Sakhalinsk (Khomutovo)

- 121st Communications Center (Yuzhno-Sakhalinsk (Khomutovo), Sakhalin Oblast)
- 41st Fighter Aviation Regiment PVO (Burevestnik, Iturup Island)
- 528th Fighter Aviation Regiment PVO (Smirnykh, Sakhalin Oblast)
- 777th Fighter Aviation Regiment PVO (Dolinsk-Sokol, Sakhalin Oblast)
- 328th independent Transport Aviation Squadron (Dolinsk-Sokol, Sakhalin Oblast)
- 140th Anti-Aircraft Missile Regiment (Poronaysk, Sakhalin Oblast)
- 752nd Anti-Aircraft Missile Regiment (Yuzhno-Sakhalinsk (Khomutovo), Sakhalin Oblast)
- 891st Anti-Aircraft Missile Regiment (Okha, Sakhalin Oblast)
- 38th Radio-Technical Regiment (Smirnykh, Sakhalin Oblast)
- 39th Radio-Technical Regiment (Dolinsk, Sakhalin Oblast)
- 125th Radio-Technical Regiment (Goryachiye Klyuchi, Kurilsky District, Sakhalin Oblast (Iturup Island)

== 11th Air Force and Air Defence Forces Army ==
Following the amalgamation of the 11th Air Defence Army and the 1st Air Army, in 2007 the 11th Army included two regiments of Su-27 fighter aircraft, one of MiG-31 interceptors, two of Su-24 tactical bombers, two of Su-25 attack aircraft and one reconnaissance regiment of Su-24MRs. The anti-aircraft component is much less powerful, including just three regiments of surface-to-air missiles, located in Khabarovsk, Komsomolsk and Vladivostok. The 23rd Fighter Aviation Regiment, located at Dzemgi (Komsomolsk-on-Amur), was the first Russian Air Force unit armed with the upgraded Su-27SM fighters.

The 303rd Fighter Aviation Division fought with the 64th Fighter Aviation Corps of the Air Defence Forces during the Korean War, flying Mikoyan-Gurevich MiG-15s, though it is not certain that the current 303rd Division is the same unit that fought during that war. The 303rd Fighter Aviation Division fought during Operation Bagration, and included the Normandie-Niemen regiment for a period.

In 2007 the commanding officer was General-Lieutenant Valeriy Ivanov (equivalent to a major-general), former commander of the 1st Air Defence Corps.

The most notable unit of the 11th Army in 2007 was the 18th Guards Vitebsk Normandie-Niemen Assault Aviation Regiment, stationed at Galyonki, which has been twice awarded the Red Banner and the Order of Suvorov. In 1943, during World War II, the regiment included the Normandie squadron of French pilots, which later became the independent regiment known as Normandie-Niemen. On 9 May 1995 (Victory Day), to commemorate these events, the 18th ShAP received the name Normandie-Niemen. Since March 1993, the unit operates the Sukhoi Su-25 attack aircraft.

=== Structure after 2007 ===
- 11th Air Army - Khabarovsk
  - 23rd Air Defence Corps - HQ at Vladivostok;
    - 22nd Guards Fighter Aviation Regiment - HQ at Tsentralnaya Uglovaya - Su-27; - 1.12.09 renamed 6989th Guards Aviation Base. [303 GSAD, other regt was 120 at Domna]
    - 530th Fighter Aviation Regiment - HQ at Chuguyevka (air base) (AFM 2007: 'Sokolovka') - MiG-25PU, MiG-31; - disbanded 1 December 2009.
  - 25th Air Defence Division - HQ at Komsomolsk-na-Amure
    - 23rd Fighter Aviation Regiment - HQ at Dzemgi - Su-27; former 60th IAP. 2000 amalgamated with the 404th Fighter Aviation Regiment, and renamed 23rd Fighter Aviation Regiment. [303 GSAD]
  - 303rd Composite Aviation Division - HQ at Ussuriysk
    - 277th Bomber Aviation Regiment - HQ at Khurba - Su-24; 1 September 2009 renamed 6988th Aviation Base.
    - 302nd Bomber Aviation Regiment - HQ at Verino - Su-24; - 1 September 2009 absorbed by the 6988th Aviation Base.
    - 18th Guards Normandie-Niemen Assault Aviation Regiment - HQ at Galenki - Su-25 - disbanded June 2009;
    - 187th Assault Aviation Regiment - HQ at Chernigovka - Su-25, merged September 2009 into 6983rd Guards Aviation Base.
    - 799th Reconnaissance Aviation Regiment - HQ at Varfolomeyevka - Su-24MR, MiG-25RB(?);
  - 257th Independent Composite Aviation Regiment - HQ at Khabarovsk-Bolshoy - An-12, An-26, Mi-8;
  - Army Aviation component;
    - Unknown Independent Helicopter Regiment - HQ at Dolinsk-Sokol (Dolinsk) - Mi-8;
    - 319th Independent Helicopter Regiment for Battle Control - HQ at Chernigovka - Mi-24;
    - 364th Independent Helicopter Regiment - HQ at Srednebelaya - Mi-8, Mi-24, Mi-26;
    - 825th Independent Helicopter Regiment - HQ at Garovka-2 - Mi-6, Mi-8, Mi-26;

=== 2023 Structure ===
- Headquarters, 11th Air and Air Defence Forces Army
  - 25th Air Defence Division 'Red Banner Komsomolskaya' (Komsomolsk-on-Аmur, Khabarovsk Krai)
    - 1529th Anti-Aircraft Missile Regiment (Khabarovsk - S-400 SAM)
    - 1530th Anti-Aircraft Missile Regiment (Bolshaya Kartel, Khabarovsk Krai) - S-400 surface-to-air missile systems (as of 2018)
    - 38th Air Defence Brigade (Birobidzhan) (S-300V4 surface-to-air missiles from the brigade reported deployed on Iturup Island)
  - 26th Air Defence Division (Chita (Zabaykalsky Krai)
    - 1723rd Anti-Aircraft Missile Regiment (Kashtak - S-300PS SAM)
  - 53rd Air Defense Division (Yelizovo)
    - 1532nd SAM Regiment (S-400 SAM as of 2018)
  - 93rd Air Defence Division (Vladivostok, Primorsky Krai)
    - 1533rd Anti-Aircraft Missile Regiment (Vladivostok - S-400/S-300V/Pantsir-S2 SAM systems)
    - 589th Anti-Aircraft Missile Regiment (Nakhodka - S-400/Pantsir SAMs)
  - 1724th Anti-Aircraft Missile Regiment (Yuzhno-Sakhalinsk, Sakhalin Oblast - S-400 SAM reported)
  - 303rd Composite Aviation Division (Khurba), Khabarovsk Krai)
    - 23rd Guards Fighter Aviation Regiment (Dzyomgi Airport) (Two squadrons: Su-35S fighters; one flight deployed at Yasny air base on Iturup Island - as of 2019)
    - 22nd Fighter Aviation Regiment (Uglovoye (airfield)) (Two squadrons: Mig-31BM/BSM; One squadron: Su-35S - 2019)
    - 277th Guards Bomber Aviation Regiment (Khurba) (Two squadrons: Su-34 - 2019)
    - 18th Guards Assault Aviation Regiment (Chernigovka (air base)) (reformed 2013 at Chernigovka; two squadrons of Sukhoi Su-25 "Frogfoot" in 2019)
    - 120th Independent Guards Fighter Aviation Regiment (Domna, Zabaykalsky Krai): (Two squadrons: Su-30SM - 2019)
    - 266th Assault Aviation Regiment (Step (air base)) (Two squadrons Sukhoi Su-25 - 2019)
    - 799th Reconnaissance Aviation Squadron (Vozdvizhenka (air base) (Sukhoi Su-24 - 2019)
  - 18th Army Aviation Brigade (formerly 573rd Aviation Base of Army Aviation (Second Rank) (Bolshoy airfield (Khabarovsk-Tsentralny), Khaborovsk, Khaborovsk Krai))
  - 112th Independent Helicopter Regiment (Chita Northwest (air base))
  - 319th Independent Helicopter Regiment (formerly 575th Aviation Base of Army Aviation (Second Rank) (Chernigovka (air base)))

Additional MiG-31BM fighters in the Eastern Military District are deployed as part of the Pacific Fleet's naval aviation forces.

Tu-95MS and Tu-22M3 bombers (including with Kh-47M2 Kinzhal ASM) deployed as part of Russian Long-Range Aviation, including based at Ukrainka in the Eastern Military District (as of 2016).

== Commanders ==
- Generál-leytenánt Uruzmag Ogoev (07.1998 - 2000);
- Generál-leytenánt av Nogovitsyn Anatoly Alekseevich (2000-2002);
- Generál-leytenánt av Sadofiev Igor Vasilievich (2002 - 05.2007);
- Generál-leytenánt Valery Ivanov (05.2007 - 2010);
- general-mayor Sergey Dronov (2010-2013);
- Generál-leytenánt Alexander Tatarenko (2013 - 12.2015);
- general-mayor Viktor Afzalov (07.2017 – 07.2018);

== See also ==
- List of military airbases in Russia
