= 25th Air Defence Division =

Russian Aerospace Forces formation

25th Red Banner Air Defence Division
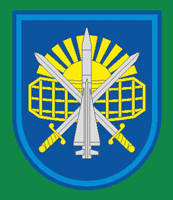
- Shoulder insignia of the division, post-2015
- Active: 1960–present
- Country: Soviet Union; Russia
- Branch: Soviet Air Defence Forces; Russian Air Defence Forces; Russian Air Force
- Type: Air defence
- Garrison/HQ: Komsomolsk-on-Amur
- Anniversaries: 30 April (formation)
- Equipment: S-400 missile system
- Decorations: Order of the Red Banner

Insignia
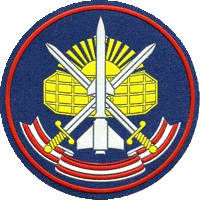
- Shoulder insignia of the 11th Aerospace Defence Brigade

The 25th Red Banner Air Defence Division (Russian: 25-я Краснознамённая дивизия ПВО; Military Unit Number 54912) is a division of the Russian Aerospace Forces, part of the 11th Air and Air Defence Forces Army. Headquartered at Komsomolsk-on-Amur, the division controls S-400 surface-to-air missile and radar units covering Khabarovsk Krai and Sakhalin.

The division was formed from the 8th Air Defence Corps of the Soviet Air Defence Forces and then the Russian Air Force, active from 1960. It was part of the 11th Air Defence Army, and subsequently the 11th Army of Air Forces and Air Defence Forces. In 2001 the 8th Air Defence Corps was renamed the 25th Air Defence Division, and in 2009 renamed the 11th Aerospace Defence Brigade. The brigade returned to its division designation in 2015.

== History ==
The 8th Air Defence Corps was formed on 30 April 1960 from the Komsomolsk and Sovetskaya Gavan Air Defence Divisions of the Separate Far Eastern Air Defence Army (ODVA PVO), when the latter was renamed the 11th Separate Air Defence Army. The Komsomolsk Air Defence Division was formed in 1958 as part of the ODVA PVO from the 168th Fighter Aviation Division PVO. The 168th had been renumbered in 1949 from the 250th Red Banner Fighter Aviation Division, formed in 1942 and decorated for its performance in the Soviet–Japanese War. The Sovetskaya Gavan Air Defence Division of the ODVA PVO was formed in January 1957 by the merger and transfer to the Air Defence Forces of the Pacific Fleet's 12th Air Defense Base District, controlling the anti-aircraft guns of the Sovetskaya Gavan Naval Base, and the 15th Fighter Aviation Division with the interceptors defending the base.

Headquartered at Komsomolsk-on-Amur, the corps was responsible for the air defence of Khabarovsk Krai, the Jewish Autonomous Oblast, and Magadan Oblast, and initially included three interceptor regiments, four surface-to-air missile regiments, and two radar (radio-technical) regiments in addition to separate radio-technical battalions. The surface-to-air missile and radar units were subsequently strengthened. The Order of the Red Banner awarded to the 250th Fighter Aviation Division was transferred to the 8th Air Defence Corps on 3 May 1965. By the end of the Cold War, in 1991, the three surface-to-air missile brigades and one regiment of the corps controlled between them thirteen S-75, ten S-125, six S-200, and four S-300 battalions. During the 1993–1994 and 1997–1998 reductions of air defence units, the corps took over units from disbanded neighbouring air defense headquarters. The corps became part of the 11th Air and Air Defence Forces Army in early 1998 when the Air Defence Forces were merged into the Air Force. It retained corps status until 2001, when it was redesignated as the 25th Air Defense Division.

The last interceptor unit of the corps, the 60th IAP at Dzyomgi, was merged with the disbanded 404th Fighter Aviation Regiment in August 2000 and inherited the latter's traditions to become the 23rd Fighter Aviation Regiment. In addition to the 23rd IAP, the division was reduced to two S-300P surface-to-air missile regiments near Komsomolsk-on-Amur and Khabarovsk, and a radio-technical brigade headquartered at Khabarovsk. The division, then commanded by Major General Andrey Yudin, included the 23rd Fighter Aviation Regiment with Su-27SM at Dzyomgi, the 1529th Guards Anti-Aircraft Missile Regiment at Khabarovsk (S-300P), the 1530th Anti-Aircraft Missile Regiment at Komsomolsk-on-Amur (S-300P), and the 45th Radio-Technical Brigade at Khabarovsk in 2008.

Under the Serdyukov reforms, the division was reorganized as the 11th Aerospace Defence Brigade in 2009, with the 23rd IAP becoming a component of an aviation base. At the same time, the 11th Air and Air Defence Forces Army was reorganized as the 3rd Air and Air Defence Forces Command. The 203rd Anti-Aircraft Missile Brigade of the Ground Forces at Birobidzhan was transferred to the 11th Aerospace Defence Brigade under the reforms, reorganized as the 1724th Anti-Aircraft Missile Regiment and equipped with the S-300V4. The reforms were partially reversed in 2015 with the reversion of the brigade to its division designation and the command to its army designation, but the 23rd remained under the 303rd Mixed Aviation Division. Open source data from this period records that the 1529th Guards and 1530th Regiments both had three battalions with a total of 24 S-300PS launchers per regiment, and the 1724th two battalions of S-300V. The brigade also included the 39th Radio-Technical Regiment at Khomutovo, Yuzhno-Sakhalinsk on Sakhalin.

In 2018, it included the 1529th Guards (Khabarovsk), 1530th (Komsomolsk-on-Amur) and 1724th (Birobidzhan) Anti-Aircraft Missile Regiments, and the 343rd Radio-Technical Regiment at Khabarovsk. That year, the 1724th was relocated to Sakhalin, where it received the S-400 by 2021. This completed the rearmament of the three regiments of the division with the S-400.

The division has been commanded by Colonel (promoted to Major General 18 February 2021) Igor Valeryevich Nikitin since 2019.

== 1988 structure ==
In 1988, the 8th Air Defence Corps included the following units:

- 60th Fighter Aviation Regiment PVO (Dzyomgi, Khabarovsk Krai)
- 301st Fighter Aviation Regiment PVO (10-й участок, Kalinka, Khabarovsk Krai), disbanded 1994
- 308th Fighter Aviation Regiment PVO (Postovaya, Khabarovsk Kray) - disbanded 1994.
- 109th Anti-Aircraft Missile Brigade (Knyaze-Volkonskoye-1, near Khabarovsk), reorganized as 1529th Guards Anti-Aircraft Missile Regiment 1994, inherited Guards status from disbanded 237th Guards Anti-Aircraft Missile Regiment (5 S-75, 7 S-125, 3 S-200 battalions)
- 118th Anti-Aircraft Missile Brigade (Komsomolsk-on-Amur, Khabarovsk Kray), reorganized as 1530th Anti-Aircraft Missile Regiment 1994 (5 S-75, 3 S-125, 3 S-200 battalions)
- 345th Anti-Aircraft Missile Brigade (Sovetskaya Gavan, Khabarovsk Kray), formerly 192nd Anti-Aircraft Missile Brigade, disbanded 1998 (2 S-200, 4 S-300 battalions)
- 1251st Anti-Aircraft Missile Regiment (Magadan, Magadan Oblast), disbanded 1992 (3 S-75 battalions)
- 55th Radio-Technical Brigade (Bochin, near Komsomolsk-on-Amur), renamed 2nd Radio-Technical Regiment 1994
- 9th Radio-Technical Regiment (Vanino)
- 213th Radio-Technical Regiment (Okhotsk)
- 48th Radio-Technical Regiment (Ilyinka, near Khabarovsk)
