= Chita Northwest air base =

Russian 112th independent Regimental Air Base

Chita-2 (UIAI)
- Chita, Zabaykalsky Krai in Russia
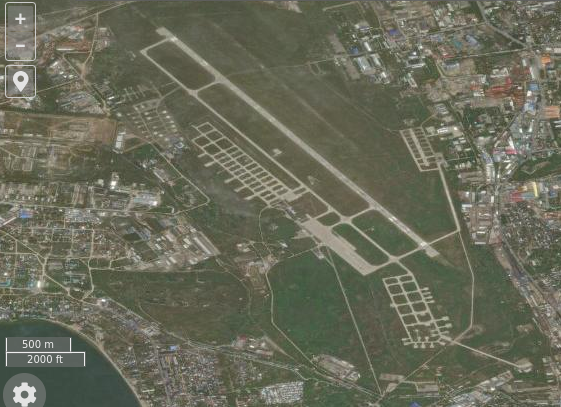
- Satellite imagery of Chita Northwest air base

Site information
- Type: Air Base
- Owner: Ministry of Defence
- Operator: Russian Aerospace Forces

Location
- Shown within Zabaykalsky Krai Chita-2 (Russia)
- Coordinates: 52°4′0″N 113°26′0″E

Site history
- Built: 1920s
- In use: -present

Airfield information
- Identifiers: ICAO: UIAI
- Elevation: 677 metres (2,221 ft) AMSL
Runways
Direction	Length and surface
15/33	2,500 metres (8,202 ft) Concrete

Chita Northwest is an air base in Russia located 5 km northwest of Chita. It is also informally called "Cheryomushki". Located on Chita's north side, this base contains a number of hangars and ramp areas. It is not to be confused with Chita Kadala Airport 10 km to its southwest. It is the home of the 112th Independent Helicоpter Regiment.

The runway was reconstructed in 2014.

== History ==
The airport was initially built in the late 1920s and previously hosted civilian aircraft. During Second World War, units of the 12th Air Army were stationed at Chita Northwest.

In 2002 the 112th Independent Helicopter Regiment came under the control of the 11th Air and Air Defence Forces Army and arrived at the airfield. The regiment had been created on 29 July 1968 from the previous 172nd Independent Helicopter Squadron. From 1967 the regiment carried the Military Unit Number (v/ch) 21812. As a squadron and as a regiment, up until 2002, it had been part of the 36th Combined Arms Army of the Transbaikal Military District. It had been based at Nerchinsk, Chita Oblast. In 1981 it was redesignated as the 112th independent transport and combat helicopter regiment. Initially, the regiment used Mil Mi-4 multi-purpose and Mil Mi-6 heavy transport helicopters, then the formation received Mi-8, since 1981 Mi-24 attack helicopters. The regiment also had Mi-10PP jamming helicopters.

During the reform of the Russian Armed Forces in 2010, the 112th Regiment was reorganized into the 439th Army Aviation Base of the 3rd Air and Air Defence Forces Command.

In 2014, the runway was reconstructed.

Insignia of the 112th Independent Helicopter Regiment

In 2017, the 439th Army Aviation Base was reorganized back into the 112th Independent Helicopter Regiment.

On March 14, 2020 a Mi-8 military helicopter (according to other data Mi-35M) from the Cheryomushki airfield became irritated by a residential building and fired a 23-mm cannon at it. There were no injuries as a result of the incident, and no major destruction.

The 2nd Independent Aviation Squadron of the National Guard of Russia was based at the field in 2022, operating Mil Mi-8MTV-2 helicopters as part of the service's Siberian Regional Command. The base was also home to the 810 Aviation Repair Plant in 2022, which performs aviation maintenance on helicopters.

== See also ==
- List of airports in Russia
- List of military airbases in Russia
