= Orlovka (air base) =

Airport in Amur Oblast, Russia

Orlovka
- Svobodny, Amur Oblast in Russia
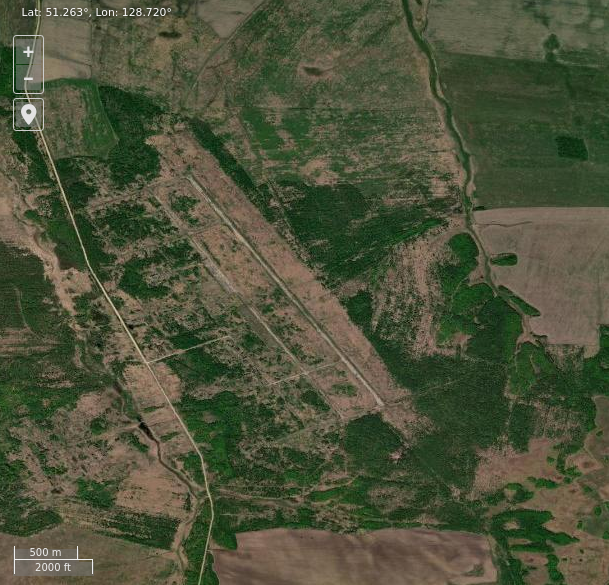
- Satellite imagery of former Orlovka air base

Site information
- Type: Air Base
- Owner: Ministry of Defence
- Operator: Russian Air Force

Location
- Shown within Amur Oblast Orlovka (Russia)
- Coordinates: 51°15′48″N 128°43′12″E

Site history
- In use: 1960 - 2001

Airfield information
- Identifiers: ICAO: XHBO
- Elevation: 259 metres (850 ft) AMSL
Runways
| Direction | Length and surface |
|---|---|
| 15/33 | 2,500 metres (8,202 ft) Concrete |

Orlovka (also given as Orlovke or Vernoye) was an airbase of the Soviet Air Defence Forces in Amur Oblast, Russia located 8 km north of Vernoye, in the Svobodny, Amur Oblast area. It is close to Ukrainka, a Long Range Aviation strategic bomber base. In the 1960s Orlovka was a deployment and dispersal airfield, then was upgraded in the early 1970s following an increase in military forces near the Chinese border after the Sino-Soviet split. Orlovka is a hardened airfield with a large central tarmac area.

The base was closed in 2001 and is since abandoned.

Units stationed at Orlovka included:

- 404th Fighter Aviation Regiment (404 IAP) equipped with Mikoyan-Gurevich MiG-23P (ASCC: Flogger) and then Sukhoi Su-27 (ASCC: Flanker). The regiment moved in from Ozernaya Pad - Kremovo, Primorskiy Kray in 1973; it was established originally in 1944. The regiment was disbanded in 2001 and its awards and honors transferred to the 23rd Fighter Aviation Regiment at Dzemgi.

== See also ==
- List of military airbases in Russia
