= Vozdvizhenka (air base) =

Military airport in Primorsky Krai, Russia

Vozdvizhenka
- Ussuriysk, Primorsky Krai in Russia
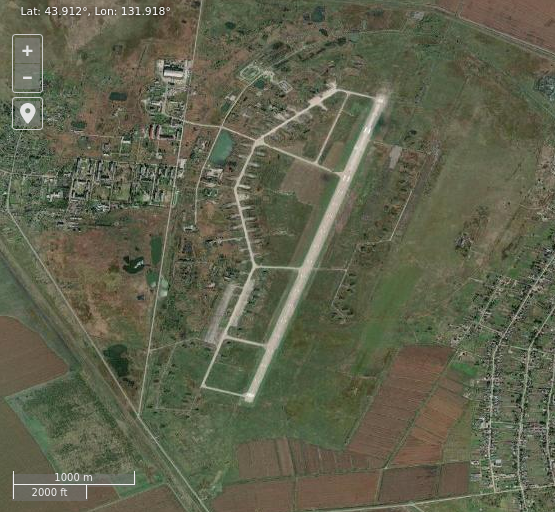
- Satellite imagery of Vozdvizhenka air base

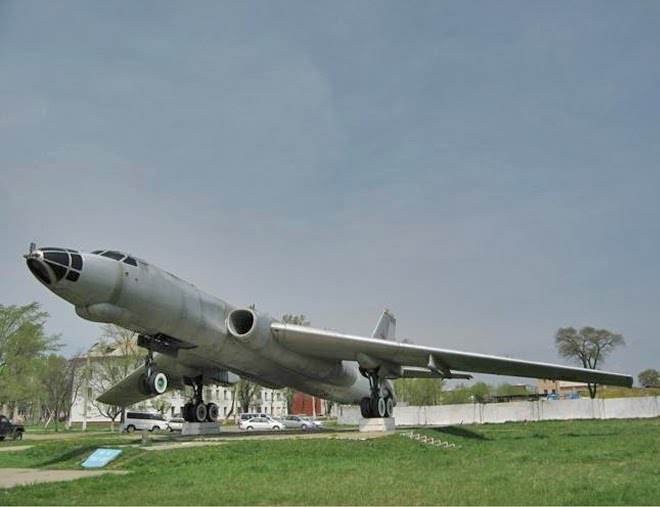
- Tupolev Tu-16 at Vozdvizhenka

Site information
- Type: Air Base
- Owner: Ministry of Defence
- Operator: Russian Aerospace Forces

Location
- Shown within Primorsky Krai Vozdvizhenka (Russia)
- Coordinates: 43°54′44″N 131°55′04″E

Site history
- Built: 1933
- In use: April 1933 - present

Airfield information
- Elevation: 40 metres (131 ft) AMSL
Runways
| Direction | Length and surface |
|---|---|
| 03/21 | 3,000 metres (9,843 ft) Concrete |

Vozdvizhenka (also known as Ussuriysk and before the 1960s Voroshilov) is an air base in Primorsky Krai located close to the village of Vozdvizhenka. This base was dedicated to Pacific heavy long-range bomber fleet, housing the 444th Berlin Order of Kutuzov 3rd degree and Alexander Nevsky Heavy Bomber Aviation Regiment, part of the 326th Heavy Bomber Aviation Division, 37th Air Army.

A declassified CIA document from 1969 showed this was the only base east of the Urals that had the Tupolev Tu-22 Blinder aircraft. Later in the 1970s onward the regiment consisted of supersonic long-range Tu-22M3 bombers.

The 444th Regiment was disbanded in 2009, with some aircraft transferred to the Belaya air base, and others dismantled (removed engines, equipment, and with holes cut in the fuselage). The aircraft carcasses are awaiting final metal cutting. Currently based at the airfield is the aviation commandant of Khurba airbase and the 322 Aircraft Repair Factory (322 ARZ).

== History ==
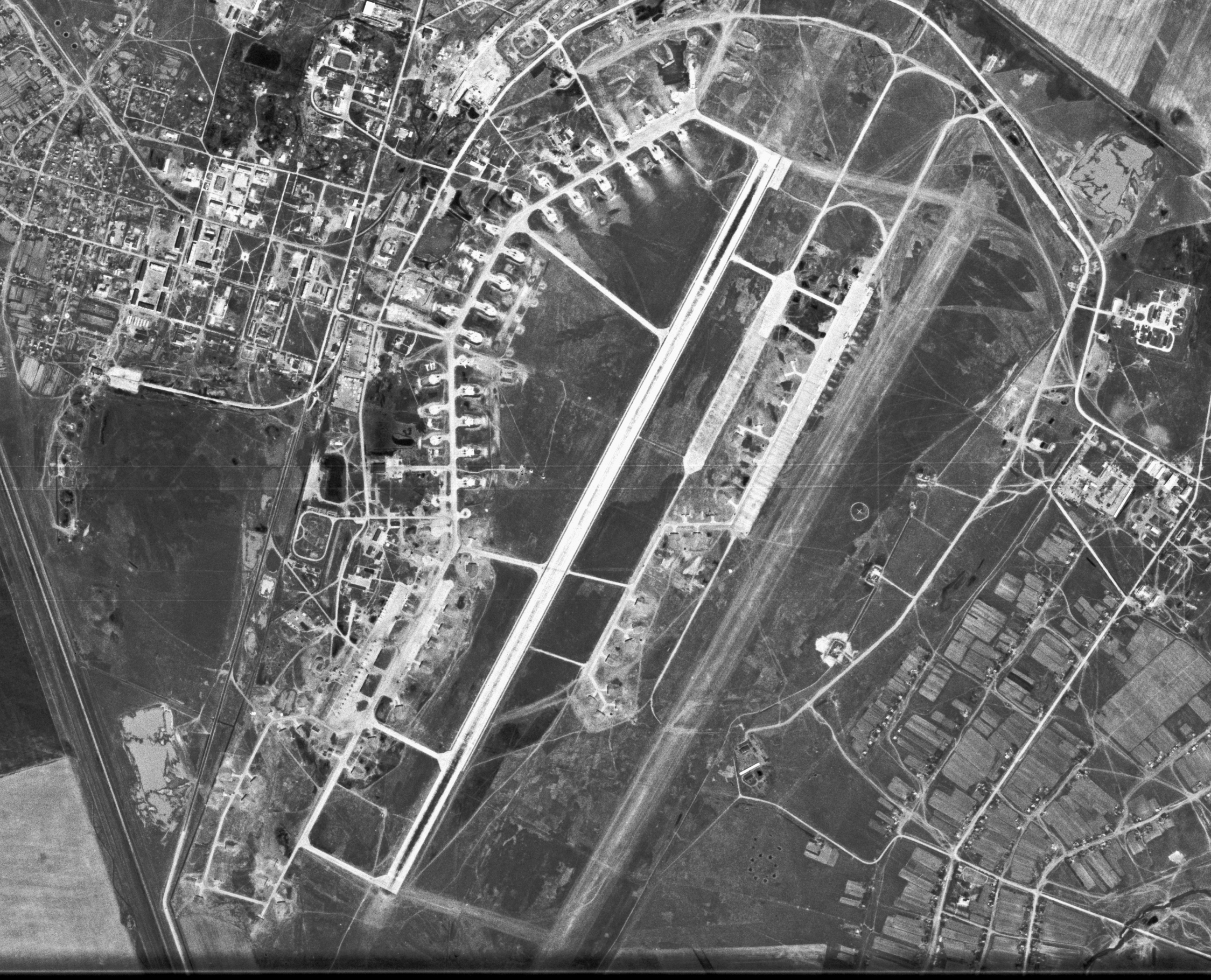
Vozdvizhenka, April 1972, KH-4 satellite image.

On Saturday, April 18, 1942, a North American B-25 Mitchell under Captain York landed here after participating in the U.S. Doolittle Raid on Tokyo. In doing so, it became the only one of the 16 launched B-25s that did not crash or was ditched. The aircraft was confiscated and its crew was interned and interviewed by the commander of the base at that time, Col. Kovalev. They were moved from the base the next morning.

Stationed at the airbase were:

- 523rd Red Orshansky Orders of Suvorov and Kutuzov and Alexander Nevsky Aviation Regiment Fighter-Bombers (APIB), 303rd Aviation Division, equipped with Sukhoi Su-17s. The regiment was disbanded in September–October 1994.
- 444th Berlin Order of Kutuzov 3rd degree and Alexander Nevsky Heavy Bomber Aviation Regiment (disbanded in 2009).

Piotr Butowski writes that the 444th Heavy Bomber Aviation Regiment was stationed in North Korea (Holm says Khanko-2 (Hamsung), North Korea, 9.1945 - 7.1948) until its return to Pozdeevka, Amur Oblast, where it was stationed from July 1948 - 1953. In 1953 the 444th Regiment moved to Vozdvizhenka. It operated Tupolev Tu-4s from September 1951 to 1957 (exact dates Holm), and from that time until 1991-92 Tupolev Tu-16 variants. The Tu-16K was in service from 1975.

As of 1991 444th TBAP was part of the 55th Heavy Bomber Air Division, 30th Air Army, with Tu-16K aircraft in service.

Butowski and Holm's sources disagree on what happened to the regiment in 1991–92. Butowski writes that it was disbanded, while Holm says that it was reequipped with Tu-22Ms. Butowski and a range of other sources, including AFM 2007, say the regiment came into existence again, possibly by 1997 by renaming the 132nd Heavy Bomber Aviation Regiment. Holm says instead that on 29 January 1997, the 132nd Heavy Bomber Aviation Regiment instead absorbed the 444th Regiment. However, most available sources (AFM and others, including Kommersant-Vlast, 2005) have listed the 444th Regiment in existence until c. 2009. The regiment reportedly became known as "444th Berlin Order of Kutuzov 3rd degree and Alexander Nevsky Bomber Aviation Regiment».

In 2009 as part of the extensive reorganisation of the Air Force the 444th Regiment was disbanded, and dismantlement of some aircraft began. Others were reportedly transferred to an air base at Belaya. As of 2012, there are no longer any strategic bombers in Primorskiy Krai; the nearest Long Range Aviation base seems now to be the 6952nd Air Base at Ukrainka, in Amur Oblast.

About 9 kilometres north of the base is a RTB, repair and technical base; language used exclusively for nuclear weapons maintenance, storage, and assembly. The unit is still active, despite the bomber base being closed. References to Military Unit 23477 (в/ч 23477) mention being posted to "Garrison Vozdvizhenka-2" (Гарнизон Воздвиженка-2); likely an offshoot of the former Vozdvizhenka airbase. в/ч 23477 is part of the 12th Chief Directorate of the Ministry of Defense of Russia (12-е Главное управление Министерства обороны России); the directorate which is "responsible for nuclear security and technical support".

== See also ==
- List of military airbases in Russia
