= Nikolai Pinchuk (pilot) =

Soviet fighter pilot and flying ace during the Second World War

- Николай Григорьевич Пинчук
- Born: 4 February 1921; Budyonovka village (located within present-day Babruysk District, Belarus
- Died: 12 January 1978 (aged 56); Minsk, USSR
- Military career
- Allegiance: Soviet Union
- Branch: Soviet Air Force
- Service years: 1940—1975
- Rank: Colonel
- Unit: 18th Guards Assault Aviation Regiment
- Conflicts: World War II
- Awards: Hero of the Soviet Union

Nikolai Grigoryevich Pinchuk (Russian: Николай Григорьевич Пинчук; 4 February 1921 — 12 January 1978) was a Soviet fighter pilot and flying ace during World War II who totaled 20 solo and 2 shared aerial victories.
