= 23rd Guards Fighter Aviation Regiment =

Russian military unit

- 23-й гвардейский истребительный авиационный полк
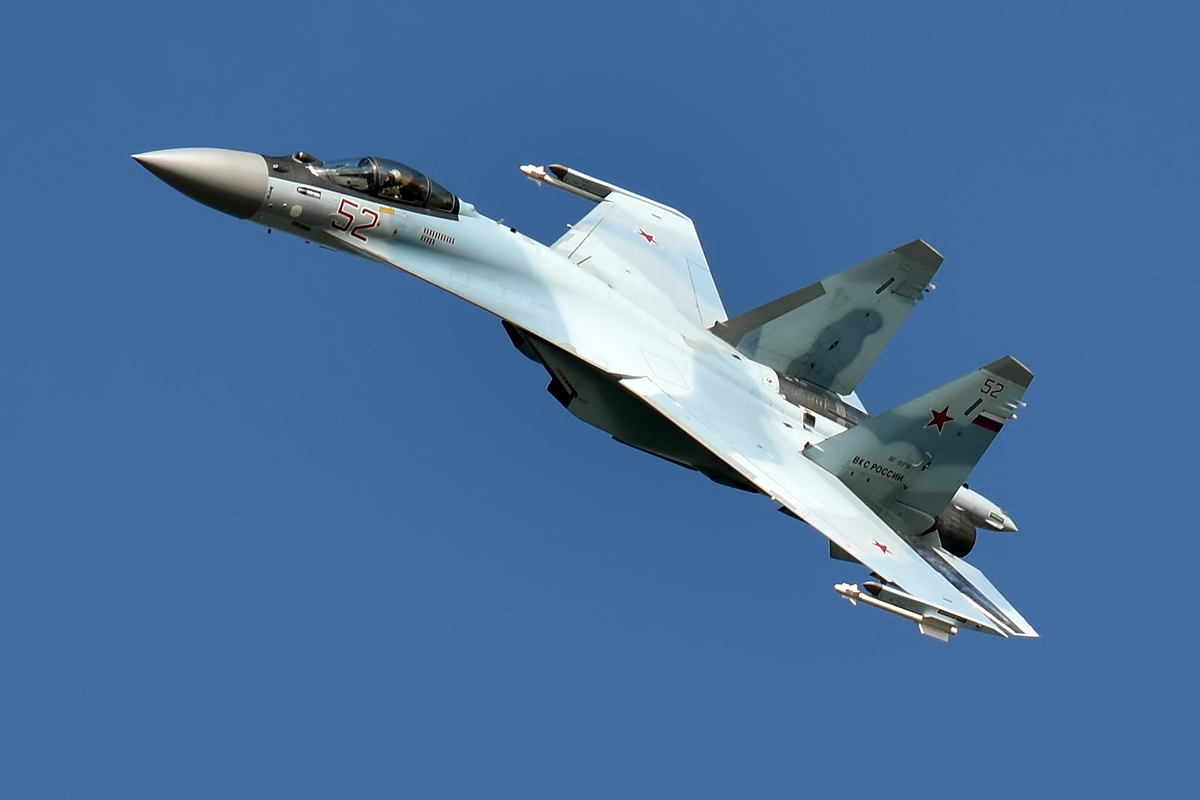
- A Sukhoi Su-35 of the regiment, 2019
- Active: 2000-present
- Country: Russia
- Branch: Russian Air Force
- Type: Regiment
- Role: Fighter
- Part of: 11th Air and Air Defence Forces Army: 303rd Composite Aviation Division
- Garrison/HQ: Dzyomgi, Komsomolsk-on-Amur
- Decorations: Guards
- Honourifics: Tallinn

Aircraft flown
- Fighter: Sukhoi Su-27, Sukhoi Su-30, Sukhoi Su-35, Sukhoi Su-57

The 23rd Guards Tallinn Fighter Aviation Regiment (Russian: 23-й гвардейский истребительный авиационный Таллинский полк; Military Unit Number 77984) is a fighter aviation regiment of the Russian Aerospace Forces. Based at Dzyomgi, the regiment is part of the 303rd Mixed Aviation Division of the 11th Air and Air Defense Forces Army. Flying the Sukhoi Su-35S, the regiment participated in the Russian invasion of Ukraine.

In 2023, the unit became the first operational regiment equipped with the Sukhoi Su-57 air superiority fighter.

== History ==
The 23rd Fighter Aviation Regiment was formed at Dzyomgi Air Base on 1 August 2000 following the amalgamation of the 60th Fighter Aviation Regiment PVO and the 404th Fighter Aviation Regiment as a result of the 1997 Russian military reform.

In December 2009, the 23rd Fighter Aviation Regiment was reorganized as a result of the 2008 Russian military reform, becoming the 6987th Aviation Base.

On 29 January 2018, the regiment was reformed once more as part of the 303rd Composite Aviation Division of the 11th Air and Air Defence Forces Army, receiving the honorific "Tallinn" perpetuating the traditions of the 404th Fighter Aviation Regiment. In Estonia, the addition of "Tallinn" to the regiment's name was characterized as "provocative".

Beginning in early August 2018, a flight from the regiment was stationed at Yasny air base on Iturup in the Kuril Islands.

The regiment participated in aerial warfare in the 2022 Russian invasion of Ukraine. Regimental navigator Major Viktor Anatolyevich Dudin was awarded the title Hero of Russia on 4 March for downing a Ukrainian Su-27 during the invasion, becoming the first pilot to receive the award during the war. Regimental deputy commander Lieutenant Colonel Ilya Andreevich Sizov received his Hero of Russia medal on 21 July, credited by state media with the destruction of eleven Ukrainian aircraft and thwarting an attempt to recapture Snake Island. For "mass heroism and courage in battle," the regiment received the Guards designation on 17 November 2022 as a reward for its performance in the Russian invasion of Ukraine.

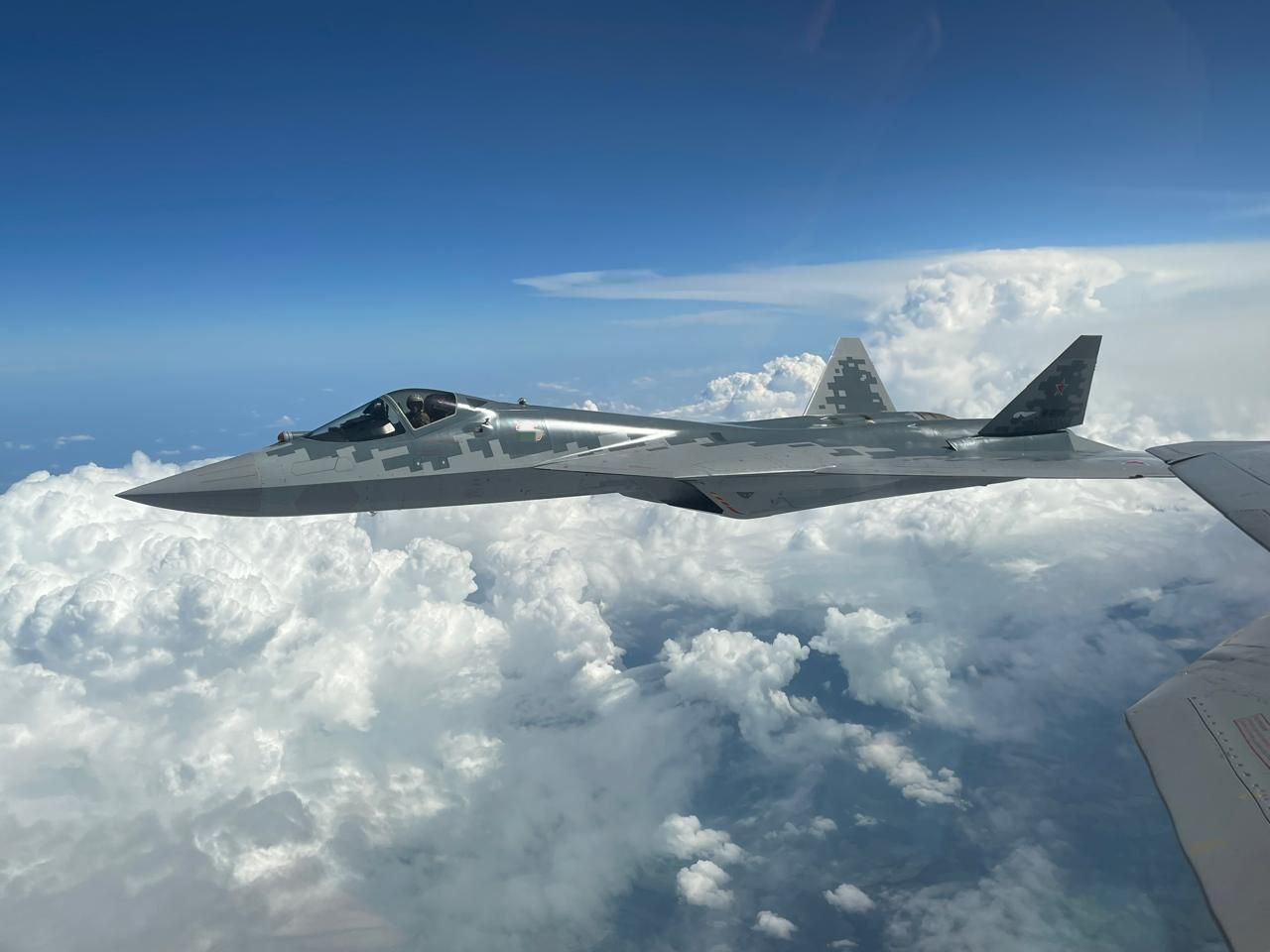
Sukhoi Su-57 in formation, 2025

In November 2022, Lieutenant Colonel Ilya Sizov, in an interview with the newspaper Suvorovsky Natisk, stated that pilots of the unit were undergoing conversion training for the fifth-generation Sukhoi Su-57 at the 4th Center for Combat Employment and Retraining of Personnel, with the regiment to become the first operational fighter unit to operate the type. Echoing the initial deployment of the Sukhoi Su-35, the regiment is co-located with the Komsomolsk-on-Amur Aircraft Plant to allow for easier logistical support, maintenance and technical assistance during the initial phase of the deployment of the new aircraft.
