= Uglovoye (airfield) =

Air base near Artyom, Russia

Uglovoye Tsentralnaya Uglovaya
- Центральная Угловая
- Artyom, Primorsky Krai in Russia
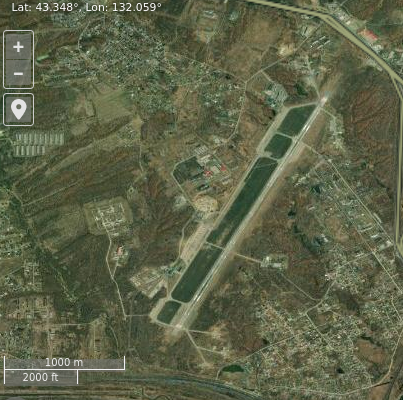
- Satellite imagery of Uglovoye air base

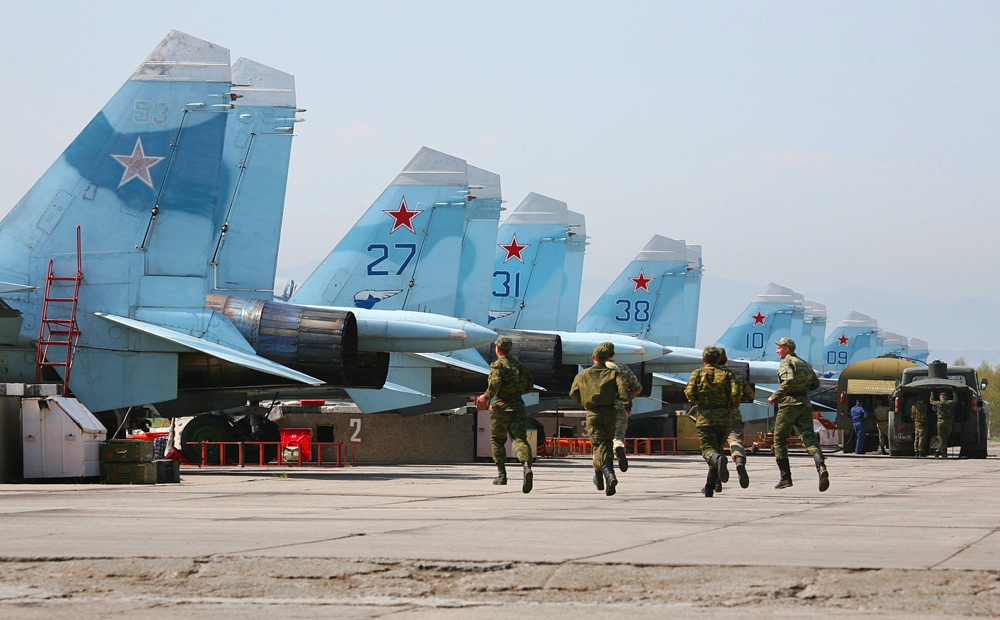

Site information
- Type: Air Base
- Owner: Ministry of Defence
- Operator: Russian Aerospace Forces
- Controlled by: 11th Air and Air Defence Forces Army

Location
- Shown within Primorsky Krai Uglovoye (Russia)
- Coordinates: 43°20′54″N 132°03′33″E

Site history
- Built: 1945
- In use: 1945 - present

Airfield information
- Identifiers: ICAO: UHIU
- Elevation: 29 metres (95 ft) AMSL
Runways
Direction	Length and surface
03/21	2,500 metres (8,202 ft) Concrete

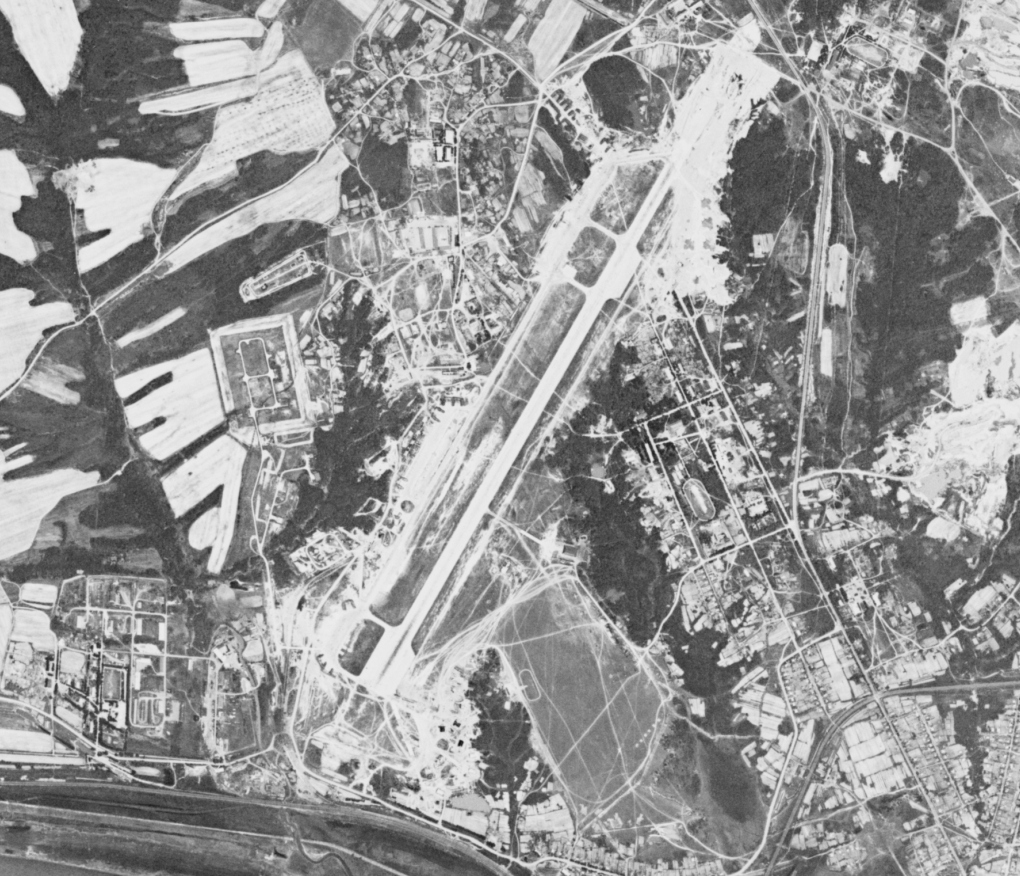
Uglovoye, 1970, from KH-4B satellite.

Uglovoye (Russian: Центральная Угловая, Tsentralnaya Uglovaya, "Central Corner"), known in the US intelligence community as Uglovoye Northwest, is an air base in Primorsky Krai located close to the town of Artyom, Russia. This is the primary air defense base for the Vladivostok area, and it was home to the PVO Strany division headquarters for the Vladivostok region

The base is home to the 22nd Guards Fighter Aviation Regiment of the 303rd Composite Aviation Division.

Michael Holm's site, relying on recently available Russian sources, writes that the 6th Fighter Aviation Regiment VVS VMF, arrived at the airfield in September 1945, and on 26 September 1945 became the 22nd Guards Fighter Aviation Regiment (22 Gv IAP) VVS VMF. The regiment became a Guards unit "For the courage shown in the battles with the Japanese imperialists, for their steadfastness and courage, discipline and organization, for the heroism of their personnel". The regiment was transferred to the Soviet Air Defence Forces in February 1957, retaining its number. It joined the 23rd Air Defence Corps of the 11th Independent Air Defence Army. In February 1968 it was awarded the Order of the Red Banner.

A declassified CIA document from 1971 showed that the base was home to one interceptor regiment, the 22nd Guards Fighter Aviation Regiment, equipped with Sukhoi Su-9 Fishpot, Yakovlev Yak-27 Flashlight, and the Mikoyan-Gurevich MiG-17 Fresco. An October 1972 satellite assessment revealed 13 Sukhoi Su-9 (ASCC "Fishpot"), 14 Yakovlev Yak-27 (ASCC "Flashlight"), and 4 Sukhoi Su-17 (ASCC "Fitter,") with small numbers of other fighters, transports, and helicopters. In 1977, the interceptor regiment replaced the aging Su-9 with the MiG-23M (ASCC "Flogger-B"). This was one of the first bases to replace the Su-9 with the MiG-23, emphasizing the priority of placing look-down shoot-down interception assets in the Vladivostok area.

Satellite imagery from 2016 shows the base to be active, with 36 Sukhoi Su-35 Flanker aircraft based on the field. Air International's April 2017 issue confirmed the 22nd Guards Fighter Aviation Regiment was still flying Su-27 variants.

Vladivostok International Airport is located 9 km (5 miles) to the northeast.

== See also ==
- List of military airbases in Russia
