= Atamanovka =

Atamanovka may refer to:

- Atamanovka, Zabaykalsky Krai, an urban-type settlement in Zabaykalsky Krai, Russia

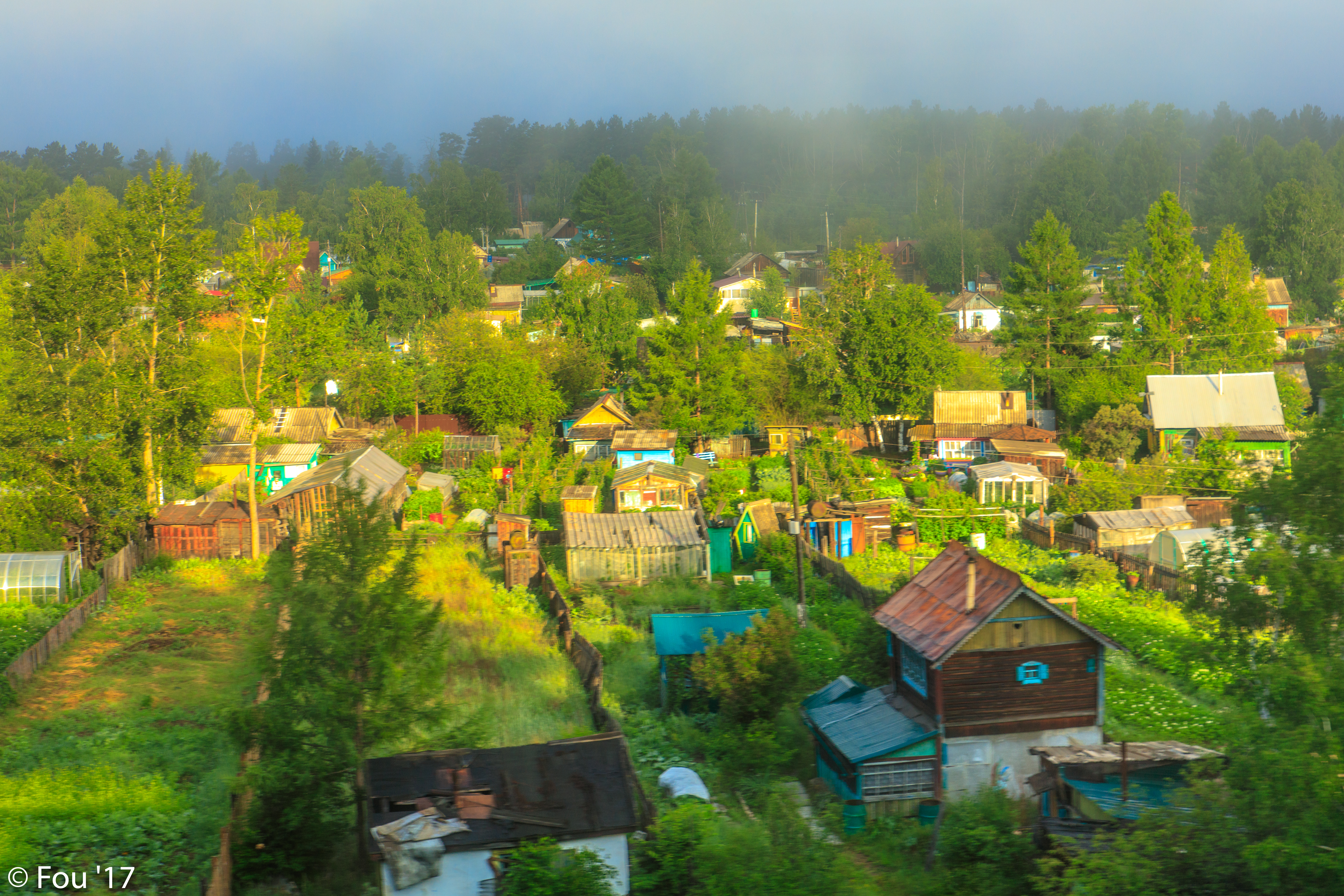
Atamanovka on the Ingoda River

- Atamanovka, Republic of Bashkortostan, a village (selo) in the Republic of Bashkortostan, Russia
- Atamanovka, name of several other rural localities in Russia
