= Kalinka Airfield =

Russian airfield

Kalinka Airfield (Blagodatnoye)
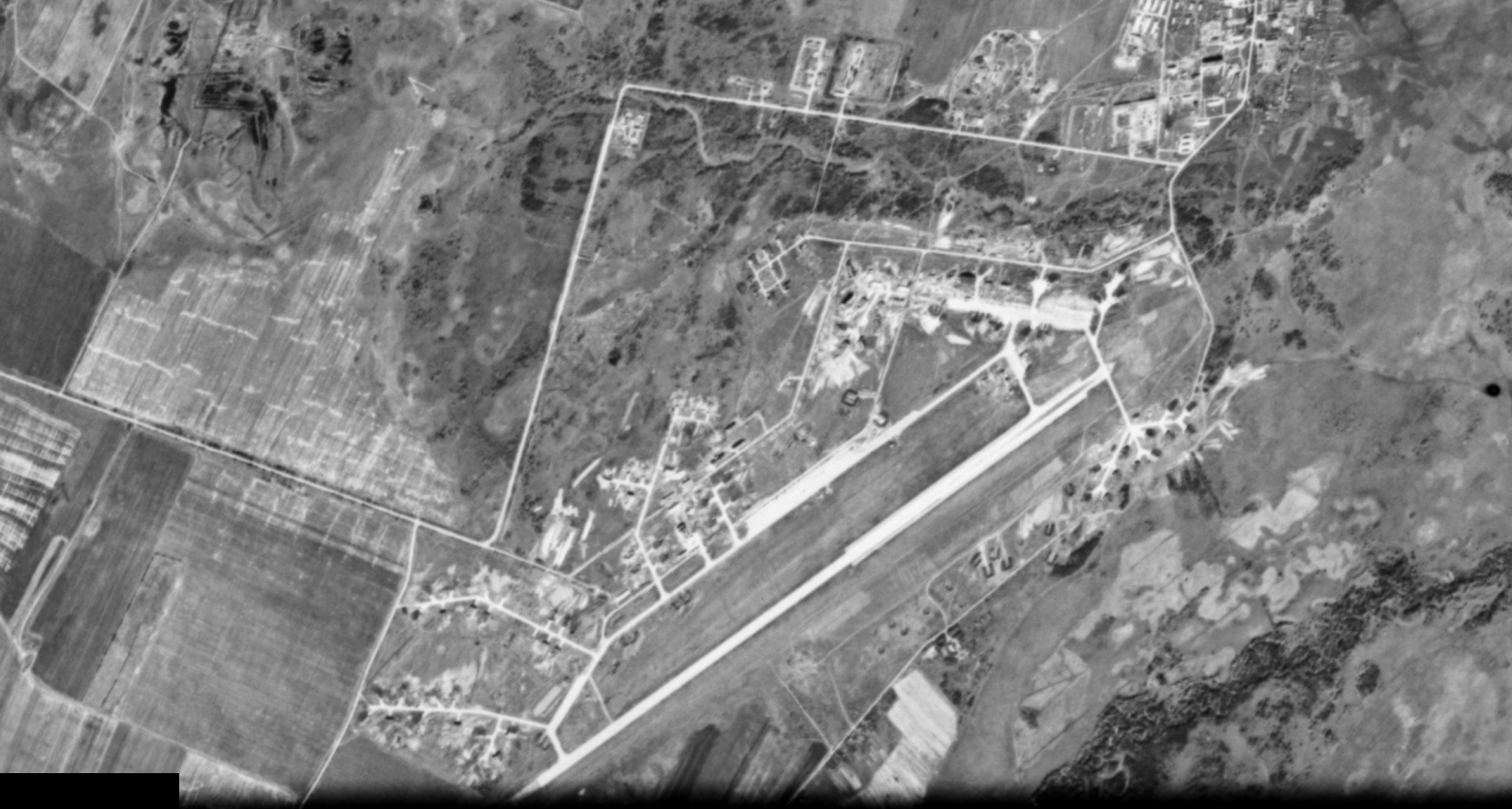
- US KH-4B satellite image of Blagodatnoye, 1971
- IATA: none; ICAO: UHHS

Summary
- Location: Blagodatnoye
- Elevation AMSL: 151 ft / 46 m
- Coordinates: 48°24′37″N 135°25′03″E

Map
- Shown within Khabarovsk Krai Kalinka (Russia)

Runways
Direction	Length		Surface
Direction	ft	m	Surface
05/23	2,600	800	Concrete
05/23 (closed)	8,202	2,500	Concrete

Kalinka Airfield is a civilian airfield located in Khabarovsk Krai, Russia located 23 km east of Khabarovsk near the town of Kalinka.

It was originally Blagodatnoye (Russian: 10-й участок, Kalinka) a former Russian military airbase and was part of the 11th Independent Air Defence Army, Soviet Air Defence Forces and hosted an interceptor regiment flying Sukhoi Su-9 (NATO: Fishpot) and Mikoyan-Gurevich MiG-17 (NATO: Fresco) aircraft. It was closed as a military base in 2009.

It is used by light aircraft.

== History ==
From November 1948 to October 1952, the 582nd Fighter Aviation Regiment was stationed on aircraft flying Lavochkin La-7 (1948-1950), Lend-Lease Bell P-63 Kingcobra (1950) and the Mikoyan-Gurevich MiG-15 (1950-1952). In October 1950, the regiment relocated to the airfield Denshahe (China).

From June 1948 until its disbandment in 1994, the 301st Fighter Aviation Regiment was based on Yakovlev Yak-9, Yakovlev Yak-11, P-63 Kingcobra (1953-1953), MiG-15 (March 1953 to 1955), Mikoyan-Gurevich MiG-17 (September 1953 to 1962), Sukhoi Su-9 (February 1962 to 1976), and the Mikoyan-Gurevich MiG-23MLD (1976 to 1994).

From 1968 until its disbandment in 1988, the 26th Guards Aviation Regiment of fighter-bombers (26th Guards Bomber Aviation Regiment since 1979) was based on the Sukhoi Su-7 (1968–1972) and Sukhoi Su-17 (1972) aircraft (until 1979), and the Sukhoi Su-24 (1979 to 1988).

From 1988 to 1991, the 216th Fighter Aviation Regiment was based at the airfield, using Sukhoi Su-27 aircraft. In 1991 it moved to Komsomolsk-na-Amure.

From 2010 onward, the airfield was no longer used for military purposes. Civilian operators include the Federation of Aviation Sports of the Far East, ChelAvia-Vostok, Representative Office of the Khabarovsk Regional Branch of AOPA-Russia. Satellite imagery shows the maintained portion of the runway was shortened to 800 m (2600 ft).

== See also ==
- List of airports in Russia
- List of military airbases in Russia
