= Chernigovka (air base) =

Russian Aerospace Forces airbase

Chernigovka
- Chernigovka, Primorsky Krai in Russia
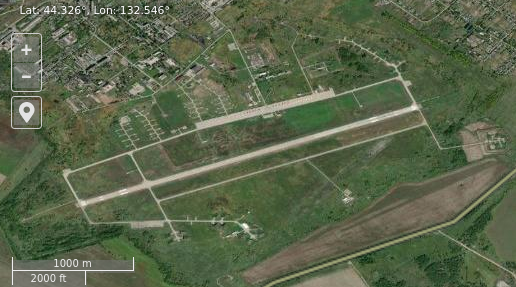
- Satellite imagery of Chernigovka air base

Site information
- Type: Air Base
- Owner: Ministry of Defence
- Operator: Russian Aerospace Forces
- Controlled by: 11th Air and Air Defence Forces Army

Location
- Shown within Primorsky Krai Chernigovka (Russia)
- Coordinates: 44°19′33″N 132°32′44″E

Site history
- In use: -present
- Battles/wars: 2022 Russian invasion of Ukraine

Airfield information
- Identifiers: ICAO: UHII
- Elevation: 92 metres (302 ft) AMSL
Runways
Direction	Length and surface
07/25	Concrete

Chernigovka is a Russian Aerospace Forces airbase located near Chernigovka, Primorsky Krai, Russia.

The base is home to the 18th Guards Red Banner Assault Aviation Regiment which flies the Sukhoi Su-25SM under the 303rd Composite Aviation Division, alongside the 319th Independent Helicopter Regiment which flies the Kamov Ka-52 and the Mil Mi-8AMTSh.

The 18th deployed to Luninets Air Base in Belarus with their Sukhoi Su-25's as part of the 2022 Russian invasion of Ukraine.

== See also ==
- List of military airbases in Russia
