= Chernigovsky District =

Chernigovsky District Черниговский район (Russian)
- District
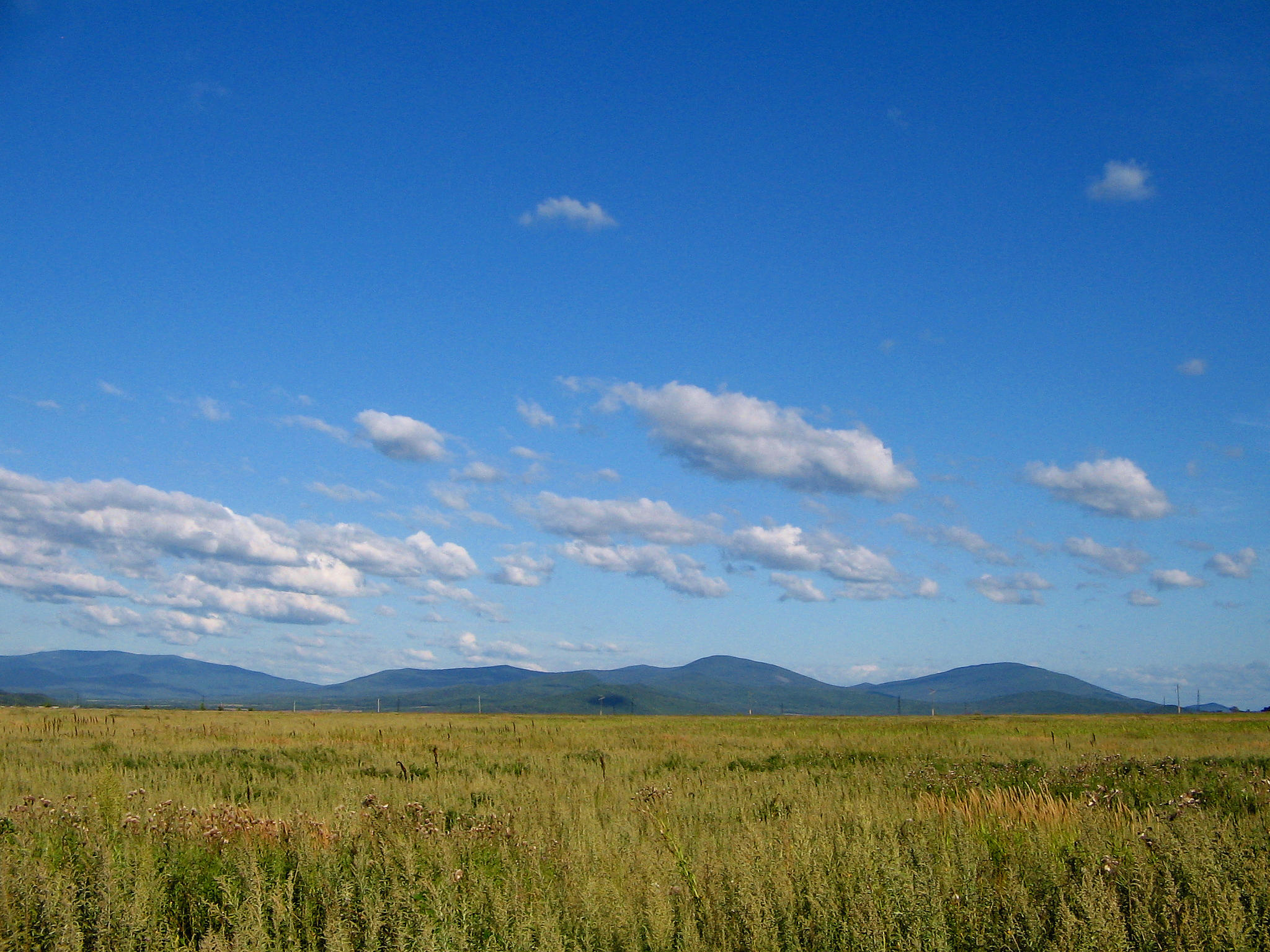
- Landscape in Chernigovsky District

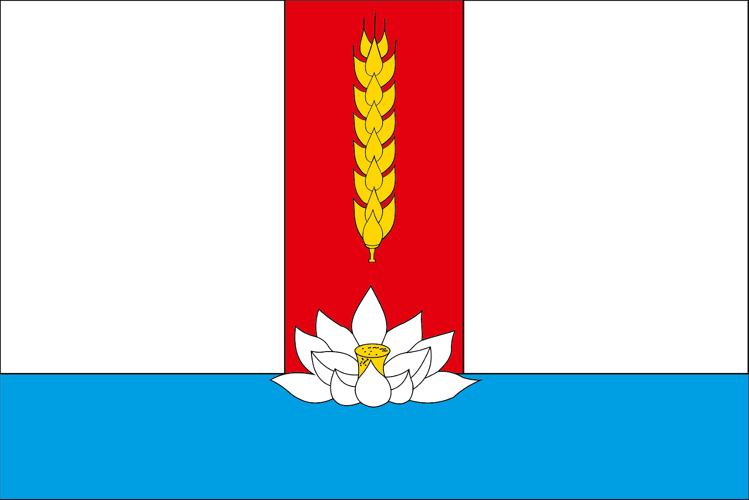
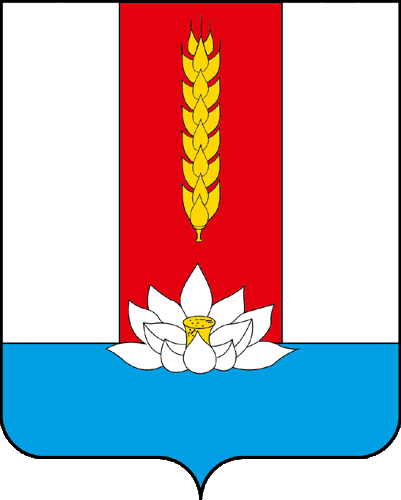
- Flag Coat of arms
- Location of Chernigovsky District in Primorsky Krai
- Coordinates: 44°12′N 132°27′E
- Country: Russia
- Federal subject: Primorsky Krai
- Administrative center: Chernigovka

Area
  - Total: 1,840.4 km^{2} (710.6 sq mi)

Population (2010 Census)
  - Total: 36,230
  - Density: 19.69/km^{2} (50.99/sq mi)
  - Urban: 24.1%
  - Rural: 75.9%

Administrative structure
  - Inhabited localities: 1 urban-type settlements, 24 rural localities

Municipal structure
  - Municipally incorporated as: Chernigovsky Municipal District
  - Municipal divisions: 1 urban settlements, 4 rural settlements
- Time zone: UTC+10 (MSK+7)
- OKTMO ID: 05653000
- Website: http://chernigovka.org/

Chernigovsky District (Russian: Черни́говский райо́н) is an administrative and municipal district (raion), one of the twenty-two in Primorsky Krai, Russia. It is located in the southwest of the krai. The area of the district is 1,840.4 square kilometers (710.6 sq mi). Its administrative center is the rural locality (a selo) of Chernigovka. Population: 36,230 (2010 census); 39,554 (2002 census); 45,782 (1989 Soviet census). The population of Chernigovka accounts for 36.0% of the district's total population.

== Notable residents ==
- Denis Kniga (born 1992 in Chernigovka), football player
