= Galyonki =

Village in Russian Far East

Coordinates: 44°02′N 131°46′E

Galyonki (Russian: Галёнки) is a rural locality (a selo) in Oktyabrsky District of Primorsky Krai, Russia. Population: 4,279 (2010 census); 5,356 (2002 census).

== History ==
It was founded in 1880.

== Military ==
The 18th Guards Vitebsk Normandie-Niemen Attack Air Regiment of the 3rd Air and Air Defence Forces Command (former 11th Air Army) was stationed at a military airfield in the vicinity, Galenki (air base), before its 2009 disbandment.
