= Chernigovka, Chishminsky District, Republic of Bashkortostan =

Chernigovka Черниговка
- Selo
- Location within Bashkortostan Location within Russia
- Coordinates: 54°35′N 55°35′E
- Country: Russia
- Region: Bashkortostan
- District: Chishminsky District
- Time zone: UTC+5:00

Chernigovka (Russian: Черниговка) is a rural locality (a selo) in Arovsky Selsoviet, Chishminsky District, Bashkortostan, Russia. As of 2010, the population was 115 in this rural locality which has 14 streets.

== Geography ==
Chernigovka is located 21 km east of Chishmy, the district's administrative centre. Bochkaryovka is the nearest rural locality.
