= Chernigovka, Primorsky Krai =

Rural locality in Primorsky Krai, Russia

Chernigovka
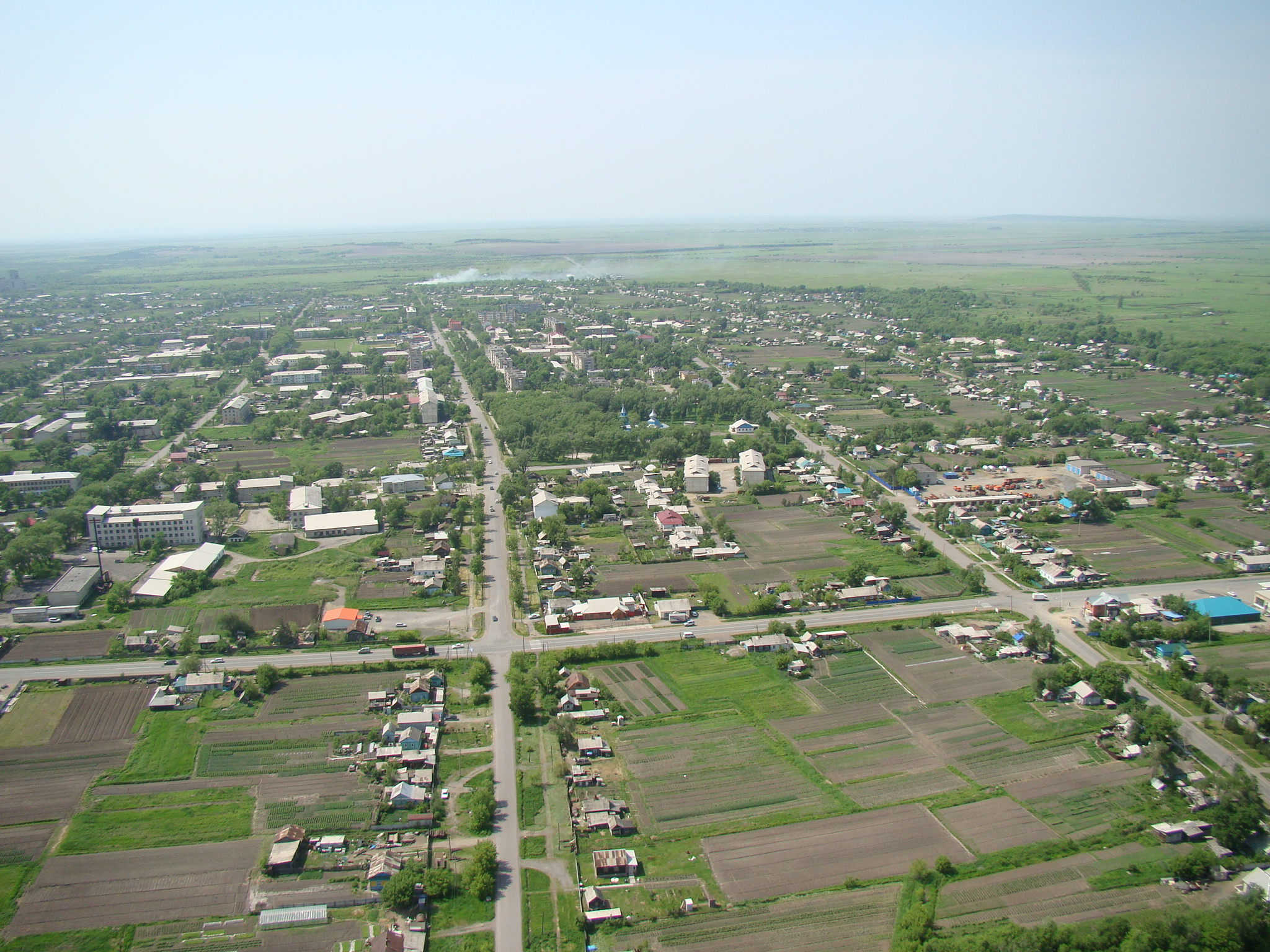
- Aerial view of Chernigovka

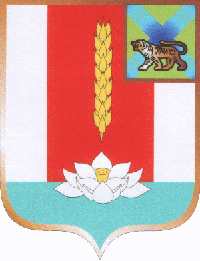
- Coat of arms
- Interactive map of Chernigovka
- Location of Chernigovka Chernigovka (Primorsky Krai)
- Coordinates: 44°20′26″N 132°34′08″E
- Country: Russia
- Federal subject: Primorsky Krai
- Founded: 1886

Population (2010 Census)
  - Total: 10,124
  - Estimate (2021): 10,124 (0%)

Municipal status
  - Municipal district: Chernigov
- Time zone: UTC+10 (MSK+7)
- Postal code: 692373
- Dialing code: +7 42351
- OKTMO ID: 05653425101
- Website: chernigovka.org

Chernigovka (Russian: Черниговка) is a rural locality (a selo) and the administrative center of Chernigovsky District, Primorsky Krai, Russia. Population: 13,046 (2010 census); 14,310 (2002 census); 15,842 (1989 Soviet census).

== History ==
Chernigovka was established in 1886 by a group of 25 families from the village of Mutin in Krolevetsky Uyezd of Chernigov Governorate. The migrants chose a comfortable plain surrounded by wooded hills and a small river, and named the village after their former home, Chernigov Governorate.

Chernigovka is the second most populous village in the Russian Far East.

It is located at the junction of the Prikhankaiskaya Plain from the west and the Sikhote-Alin Mountains from the east, which is why the climate here differs from Vladivostok in the direction of sharply continental. Winters are frostier, summers are hotter.

== Population ==
Population size
Year	Population
1897	1393
1900	1235
1912	2267
1915	3167
1926	4064
1939	11 088
1959	10 699
1970	12 848
1979	14 350
1989	15 842
2002	14 310
2008	13 820
2010	13 046
2021	10 124

According to the 1926 census for the Far Eastern region, the settlement had 921 households and 4,064 residents (2,034 men and 2,030 women), of which the predominant nationality was Ukrainian (690 households).

The national composition of Chernigovka according to the 1939 census: Russians - 66.7% or 7,400 people, Ukrainians - 29.8% or 3,301 people.

== Economy ==
Chernigovka has developed agriculture, food industry and mechanical engineering. Agriculture is represented by dairy and beef cattle breeding, production of soybeans, vegetables and potatoes.

The Trans-Siberian Railway (Muchnaya station) and the federal highway "Ussuri" Vladivostok - Khabarovsk pass through the village.

== Airbase ==
At the Chernihovka "VETRYAK" military airfield, two aviation regiments were stationed until 2009: the 319th Separate Red Banner Helicopter Regiment named after V. I. Lenin, operating Mi-24 and Mi-8 helicopters, and, since 1985, the 187th Assault Aviation Regiment on Su-25 attack aircraft, which, as a result of the 2009 military reorganization, were disbanded, and a first-class aviation base was formed, incorporating the former 319th Separate Helicopter Regiment and the 187th Assault Aviation Regiment, as well as personnel from the disbanded 18th Guards Assault Aviation Regiment "Normandie-Niemen" (Galyonki), in 2010, the first-class aviation base underwent another reorganization, the base was disbanded, separating the army aviation into the independent 575th Army Aviation Base and the assault aviation into the assault aviation group of the 6983rd Aviation Base (headquartered at Khurba Airfield, Khabarovsk Krai, after Army General S. K. Shoigu took over as Minister of Defense, a decision was made to restore the former names of the distinguished regiments, and since 2013, the 18th Assault Aviation Regiment "Normandie-Niemen," part of the 303rd Guards Mixed Aviation Division, and the 319th Separate "Lenin" Helicopter Regiment have been stationed at the Chernihovka airfield.
