= Chernigovka, Arkharinsky District, Amur Oblast =

Chernigovka Черниговка
- Selo
- Location within Amur Oblast Location within Russia
- Coordinates: 49°37′N 129°56′E
- Country: Russia
- Region: Amur Oblast
- District: Arkharinsky District
- Time zone: UTC+9:00

Chernigovka (Russian: Черниговка) is a rural locality (a selo) and the administrative center of Chernigovsky Selsoviet of Arkharinsky District, Amur Oblast, Russia. The population was 149 as of 2018. There are six streets.

== Geography ==
Chernigovka is located near the Trans-Baikal Railway, 30 km north of Arkhara (the district's administrative centre) by road. Domikan is the nearest rural locality.
