= Chernigovka, Davlekanovsky District, Republic of Bashkortostan =

Chernigovka Черниговка
- Village
- Location within Bashkortostan Location within Russia
- Coordinates: 54°20′N 54°59′E
- Country: Russia
- Region: Bashkortostan
- District: Davlekanovsky District
- Time zone: UTC+5:00

Chernigovka (Russian: Черниговка) is a rural locality (a village) in Polyakovsky Selsoviet, Davlekanovsky District, Bashkortostan, Russia. The population was 107 as of 2010. There is 1 street.

== Geography ==
Chernigovka is located 22 km north of Davlekanovo (the district's administrative centre) by road. Polyakovka is the nearest rural locality.
