= Lev Shchukin =

Lev Kirillovich Shchukin
- Лев Кириллович Щукин
- Born: 29 October 1923; Noginsk, USSR
- Died: 2 May 2009 (aged 85); Minsk, Belarus
- Military career
- Allegiance: Soviet Union
- Branch: Soviet Air Force
- Service years: 1941 – 1959
- Rank: Colonel
- Unit: 18th Guards Fighter Aviation Regiment
- Conflicts: World War II; Korean War
- Awards: Hero of the Soviet Union

Lev Kirillovich Shchukin (Russian: Лев Кириллович Щукин; 29 October 1923 – 2 May 2009) was a Soviet MiG-15 flying ace during early phase of the Korean War. After being badly injured from bailing out of his stricken plane he continued to serve as an officer in the Soviet Air Force and was sent to various communist countries as a military adviser.

== Early life ==
Shchukin was born on 29 October 1923 to a working-class family in Noginsk. They soon moved to Krasnodar, where he entered a local aeroclub in 1939, which he graduated from in June 1941. Continuing his aviation career, he went on to graduate from the Odessa Higher Military School of Pilots in 1944 as a junior lieutenant. However, he did not see combat in World War II since he was a flight instructor and later assigned to a reserve regiment until August 1945.

== Korean war ==
Serving with the 18th Guards Fighter Aviation Regiment, he gained his first shootdown on 1 June 1951, after he attacked a group of F-51s. The plane he shot down was an F-51D belonging to Harry C. Moore, who was killed. A few days later on 6 June he scored his first shared victory, an F-80C. The pilot, Francis E. Johnson, survived and was rescued.

On 17 June 1951 he participated in combat between 25 F-86s and 30 MiG-15s of his unit, and after shooting down one F-86, he was also downed, possibly by Captain Samuel Pesacreta. During the engagement he suffered shrapnel wounds, but was able to return to combat in less than two months since he was rescued by the Chinese and taken to a hospital. He made his first flight after the injuries on 29 August, during which he surprised a group of RAAF Gloster Meteors of the 77th Squadron, hitting the A77-616 Gloster Meteor of squadron leader Wilson; however, Wilson was able to fly back to his airbase.

On 20 September 1951 F-80C No. 49-862 piloted by Lewis P. Pleiss was shot down, probably by Shchukin. During the dogfight Alexander Smorchkov also claimed aerial victories. Pleiss was killed in action.

On 2 October 1951 he badly damaged the F-86E Sabre "Lady Frances" (No. 51-2746) which was often flown by Colonel Francis Gabreski, Executive Officer of the 4th Fighter Wing; some historians credit the attack as an aerial victory, although the aircraft was eventually repaired before being destroyed from combat on 21 November 1951.

Later in October he was credited with aerial victories of: an F-80C (No. 49-695) on 22 October piloted by Louis Esposito, who was killed; an F-84E (No. 50-1220) on 23 October piloted by John Shewmaker, who died; an RAAF Meteor (No. A77-316) piloted by Hamilton Foster on 24 October, which was damaged but repaired; and an RF-80A (No. 44-84849) piloted by Grant Madsen who was killed on 30 October.

In a postwar interview Shchukin claimed that he and his colleagues shot down two F-84s and damaged another on 18 November, but American records indicate the loss of just one F-84 (No. 51-542); however, some historians believe that one was shot down by him. Other sources indicate the plane he shot down that day to have been an F-86.

After being shot down on 11 January 1952, Shchukin sustained three compression fractures on his spine due to parachuting onto rocks. Multiple American pilots claimed to have shot him down that day, including Gabreski. Shchukin expected to die upon landing and sustaining the injuries, but he was discovered by nearby Soviet anti-aircraft gunners on the ground. During the Korean War he was shot down twice, flew 121 combat sorties, had flight hours totaling 99 hours and 49 minutes, participated in 37 aerial battles and was credited with at least 15 solo air victories, making him the third-highest scoring Soviet ace of the war.

=== Final tally ===
Estimates of Shchukin's tally include: at least 10; 15 solo shootdowns; and 15 solo plus 2 shared.

== Postwar ==
After the war Shchukin remained in the military until 1977. He graduated from the Air Force Academy in 1956, after which he held a variety of command posts as served as a military adviser in Vietnam and Egypt in addition to assisting in the training of soldiers from Warsaw pact states. Because of his injuries from the war he was initially prohibited from flying jets by the medical commission, but after much persistence he managed to get the restrictions down to just a ban on parachuting. During his career he flew the Po-2, I-16, Yak-1, Yak-3, Yak-7, Yak-9, Yak-15, MiG-15, MiG-17, and MiG-21, accumulating over 2700 flight hours. He died in Minsk on 1 May 2009.

== Awards ==
- Hero of the Soviet Union (13 November 1951)
- Two Order of Lenin (13 November 1951 and 22 September 1952)
- Order of the Red Banner (10 October 1951)
- Order of the Red Star (30 December 1956)
- Medal "For Battle Merit" (19 November 1951)

== See also ==
- List of Korean War flying aces
