= Chernigovka, Svobodnensky District, Amur Oblast =

Chernigovka Черниговка
- Selo
- Location within Amur Oblast Location within Russia
- Coordinates: 51°27′N 128°15′E
- Country: Russia
- Region: Amur Oblast
- District: Svobodnensky District
- Time zone: UTC+9:00

Chernigovka (Russian: Черниговка) is a rural locality (a selo) in Chernigovsky Selsoviet of Svobodnensky District, Amur Oblast, Russia. The population was 459 as of 2018. There are 11 streets.

== Geography ==
Chernigovka is located 22 km northeast of Svobodny (the district's administrative centre) by road. Yukhta-3 is the nearest rural locality.
