= Galenki (air base) =

Russian Air Force base

Galenki
- Галёнки
- Galyonki, Primorsky Krai in Russia
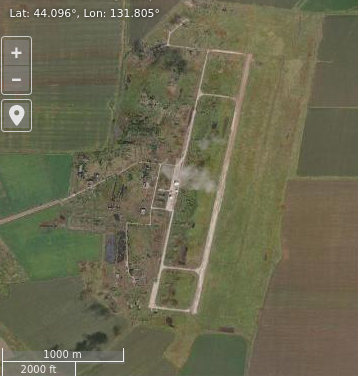
- Satellite imagery of the former Galenki air base

Site information
- Type: Air Base
- Owner: Ministry of Defence
- Operator: Russian Air Force

Location
- Shown within Primorsky Krai Galenki (Russia)
- Coordinates: 44°05′46″N 131°48′19″E

Site history
- Built: 1952
- In use: 1952 - 2010

Airfield information
- Identifiers: ICAO: XHIG
- Elevation: 24 metres (79 ft) AMSL
Runways
| Direction | Length and surface |
|---|---|
| 02/20 | 2,500 metres (8,202 ft) Concrete |

Galenki (Russian: Галёнки) is a former Russian Air Force base in Primorsky Krai, Russia.

From January 5, 1942 to October 1945, the 582nd Fighter Aviation Regiment (582 IAP) was based at the aerodrome, taking part in the Soviet-Japanese war with Lavochkin La-5 aircraft.

Beginning in September 1950, the 18th independent Guards Assault Aviation Regiment.Vitebsk was stationed at Galenki, armed initially with Mikoyan-Gurevich MiG-15 (ASCC: Fagot) jets, but upgrading in the 1950s and 1960s to the Mikoyan-Gurevich MiG-17 (ASCC: Fresco) and Mikoyan-Gurevich MiG-21 (NATO: Fishbed). In 1982, the fighter aviation regiment was transformed into an aviation regiment of fighter-bombers.

In May 1989, the regiment re-equipped the MiG-27K and MiG-27D, then in March 1993, the regiment received Sukhoi Su-25 (ASCC: Frogfoot) airplanes and was transformed into an assault aircraft unit.

On December 1, 2009, the regiment and airfield support units were transformed into the 6983rd Guards Aviation Base of the first category (military unit 62231). At the end of 2010, the headquarters of the 6983rd was transferred to the Khurba-2 garrison. The air attack aircraft unit was relocated to Chernigovka in Primorsky Krai, where it merged with the remnants of the local 187th Assault Air Regiment.

According to Google Maps satellite maps for 2017, at the Galenki airfield, a radar dome was built in the middle of the main taxiway, so the use of the airfield for its intended purpose seems deeply doubtful.

== See also ==
- List of military airbases in Russia
