= Atamanovka, Republic of Bashkortostan =

Atamanovka Атамановка
- Selo
- Location within Bashkortostan Location within Russia
- Coordinates: 55°34′N 56°42′E
- Country: Russia
- Region: Bashkortostan
- District: Karaidelsky District
- Time zone: UTC+5:00

Atamanovka (Russian: Атамановка) is a rural locality (a selo) in Kirzinsky Selsoviet, Karaidelsky District, Bashkortostan, Russia. The population was 104 as of 2010. There are 5 streets.

== Geography ==
Atamanovka is located 57 km southwest of Karaidel (the district's administrative centre) by road. Khoroshayevo is the nearest rural locality.
