= Dzyomgi Airport =

Dzyomgi Airport (Komsomolsk na Amure/Dzemgi) Аэропорт Дзёмги
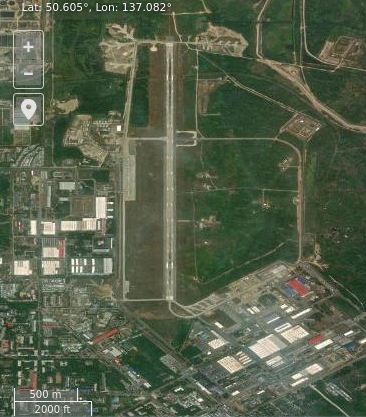
- Satellite imagery of Dzyomgi air base

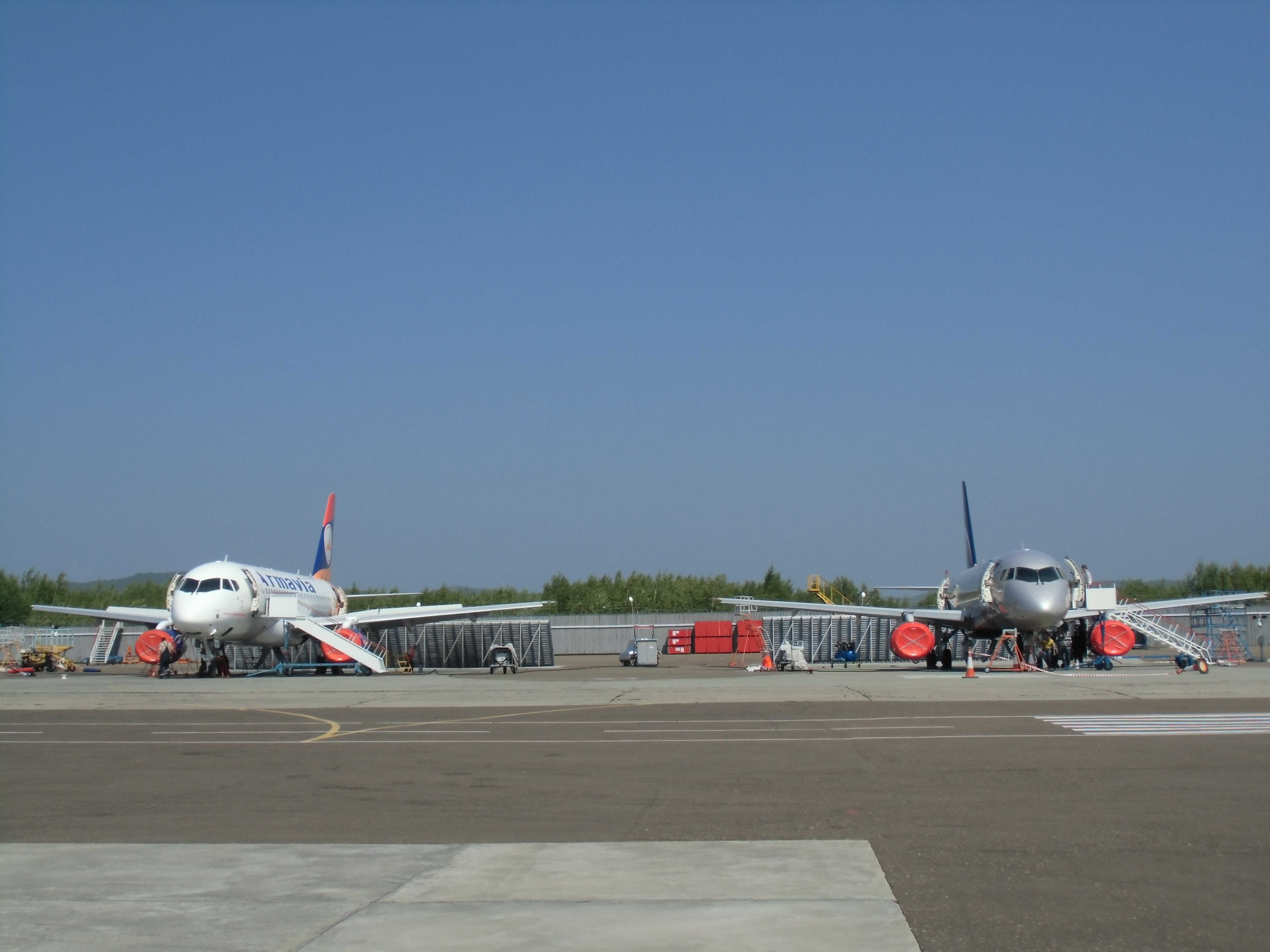
- IATA: none; ICAO: UHKD

Summary
- Airport type: Military
- Operator: Russian Aerospace Forces
- Location: Komsomolsk-na-Amure
- Elevation AMSL: 89 ft / 27 m
- Coordinates: 50°36′18″N 137°4′54″E

Map
- Location in Khabarovsk Krai Dzyomgi Airport (Komsomolsk na Amure/Dzemgi); Аэропорт Дзёмги (Russia) Dzyomgi Airport (Komsomolsk na Amure/Dzemgi); Аэропорт Дзёмги (Asia)

Runways
| Direction | Length | | Surface |
| Direction | ft | m | Surface |
|---|---|---|---|
| 01/19 | 8,136 | 2,480 | Concrete |

Dzyomgi Airport (Russian: Аэропорт Дзёмги) (ICAO: UHKD) is an air base in Khabarovsk Krai, Russia, located 8 kilometres (5 mi) northeast of Komsomolsk-na-Amure. Dzyomgi is Komsomolsk-na-Amure's northeast side airport, handling small airliner traffic.

On May 7, 1939, at the airfield, the formation of the 60th Fighter Aviation Regiment began on I-16 aircraft.

From 2000-2001 the base has been home to the 23rd Fighter Aviation Regiment (23 IAP) which flies the Sukhoi Su-30M2/SM and the Sukhoi Su-35S under the 303rd Composite Aviation Division. After the beginning of the 2022 Russian invasion of Ukraine, the regiment received Guards status as the 23rd Guards Fighter Aviation Regiment.

The airport is also the site of a major Sukhoi plant (GAZ 126), built in 1934, where the Sukhoi Su-7 and later models have been built. In September 2007, Sukhoi unveiled a passenger jet, the Superjet 100, at the airport. Beginning in January 2010, the new fifth generation stealth fighter jet the Sukhoi PAK FA (T-50) was built at Dzyomgi Airport.

The airfield has been reported as the factory airfield of the Komsomolsk-on-Amur Aircraft Plant (KnAAPO).

== Military use ==
60th Fighter Aviation Regiment (60 IAP) was active at this airfield from 1945, flying Su-27 aircraft from June 1985. After the war it took on the Military Unit Number 45010. It was part of the 8th Air Defence Corps of the 11th Independent Air Defence Army. In 2000-2001, it was merged with the 404 IAP at Orlovka to become the 23rd Fighter Aviation Regiment.

Google Earth high-resolution satellite imagery accessed in 2006 showed a rare glimpse of over 40 interceptor aircraft distributed across the airfield on a webwork of interceptor alert pads, much as Soviet PVO bases would have operated during the peak of the Cold War. Although some of the aircraft are probably operational, others are probably simply parked and awaiting depot maintenance at the airfield's Sukhoi facility.

== See also ==
- List of airports in Russia
- List of military airbases in Russia
- Komsomolsk-na-Amure/Khurba air base - south of Komsomolsk-on-Amur
