= Komsomolsk-on-Amur Airport =

Airport in Russia

Komsomolsk-na-Amur Khurba Комсомольск-на-Амуре Хурба
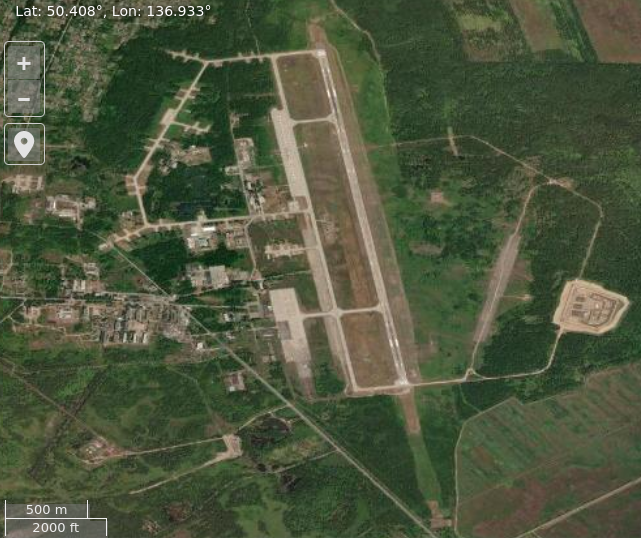
- Satellite imagery of Komsomolsk-on-Amur Airport

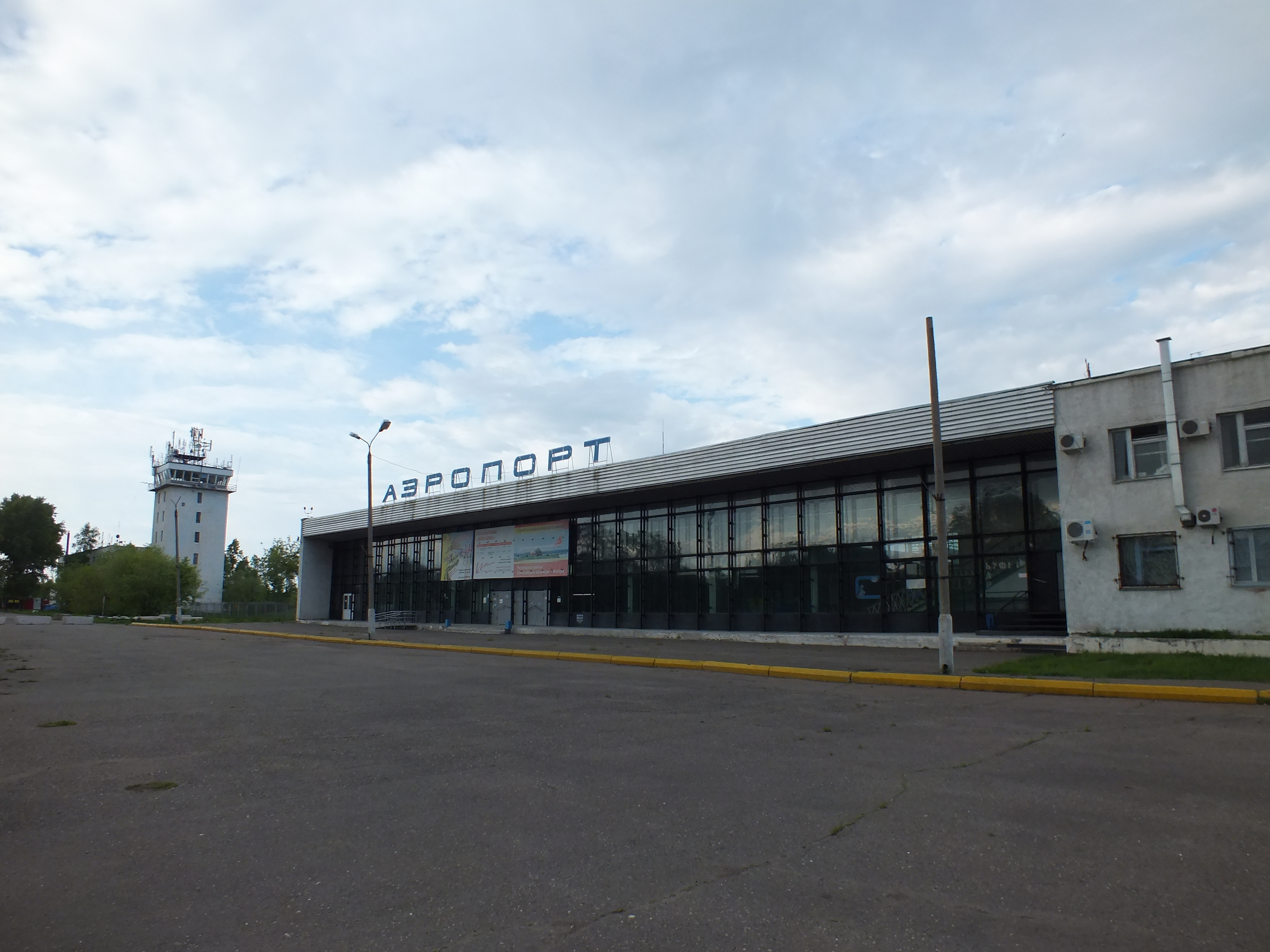
- IATA: KXK; ICAO: UHKK; LID: КСЛ

Summary
- Airport type: Public/Military
- Operator: Russian Aerospace Forces
- Location: Komsomolsk-na-Amure
- Elevation AMSL: 92 ft / 28 m
- Coordinates: 50°24′30″N 136°56′0″E
- Website: www.airksl.ru

Map
- Location of airport in Khabarovsky Krai

Runways
Direction	Length		Surface
Direction	ft	m	Surface
18/36	8,202	2,500	Concrete

Khurba Airport (also given as Komsomolsk South, Khurba, Uchastok, and Kalinovka) (IATA: KXK, ICAO: UHKK) is an air base (also used for public (Russian: Аэропорт Хурба)) in Khabarovsk Krai, Russia 17 kilometres (11 mi) south of Komsomolsk-on-Amur. This medium-sized base has considerable tarmac space and an extended area of revetments. It handles medium-sized airliners.

The 277th Guards Bomber Aviation Regiment (277 Gv BAP) is currently changing from flying Sukhoi Su-24M2s in the 1990-2000s to the Sukhoi Su-34 (AFIP "Fullback") with the first 10 delivered.

The regiment was deployed to Lida (air base) in Belarus as part of the 2022 Russian invasion of Ukraine

== History ==
Khurba Airport began as a military airfield garrison Khurba-2. The airfield was built during the Second World War with its old original runway with length of 810 meters is not currently in use. At the airport deployed:

- From November 1948 to June 1962: 311th Fighter Regiment defense on the Yak-9, MiG-15, MiG-17 and Su-9. Disbanded at the airport June 21, 1962.
- From October 1970 to September 1, 2009: 277th Bomber Aviation Regiment Mlavsky Red Banner on the Sukhoi Su-24M
- From 1991 to 1998: 216th Fighter Aviation Regiment (216 IAP) with Sukhoi Su-27 airplanes

Later, the garrison was reorganized to the 6988th Air Base circa 2008. The airfield was built for the Ministry of Defense standards with scattered parking, arched reinforced concrete shelters for aircraft and reserve a dirt runway parallel to the concrete.

The airport regularly worked in Soviet times with daily flying international flights for the Far East region.

=== 1990s to 2000s ===
From the late 1990s to late 2000s, the airport was effectively closed to passenger traffic, in the summer time (periodically) flying to Moscow JSC "Krasnoyarsk airlines" airplanes Tu-154 with a stopover in Krasnoyarsk (once a week). In summer 2009, after a decade flights began to perform again in Moscow - the carriage is performed airline "Vladivostok Avia" in the aircraft Tu-204-300. In late 2011, "Vladivostok Avia" was purchased by Aeroflot, whose leadership has recognized the flights to and from Komsomolsk-on-Amur are unprofitable, and a major industrial center of the Far East was again left without a direct air link to the capital.

=== 2010s ===
In 2016 the airport was privatized with its shares sold for 70.15 million ruble to a St. Petersburg "EVM Property". It is planned to resume air service between Komsomolsk-on-Amur and cities such as Khabarovsk, Yuzhno-Sakhalinsk, Nikolayevsk-on-Amur, Okhotsk, Vladivostok, Petropavlovsk-Kamchatsky and Irkutsk. In the future, it will be established air communication with Moscow. It is expected that the airport will open at least five regional flights a week.

== Airlines and destinations ==
Airlines	Destinations
Aurora	Vladivostok

== See also ==
- List of airports in Russia
- List of military airbases in Russia
- Komsomolsk-na-Amure Dzyomgi Airport, which is north of the city
