= Vladimirovka, Russia =

Vladimirovka (Russian: Влади́мировка) is the name of a number of rural localities in Russia.

== Modern localities ==
=== Altai Krai ===
As of 2010, one rural locality in Altai Krai bears this name:

- Vladimirovka, Altai Krai, a selo under the administrative jurisdiction of the town of krai significance of Slavgorod

=== Altai Republic ===
As of 2010, one rural locality in the Altai Republic bears this name:

- Vladimirovka, Altai Republic, a selo in Korgonskoye Rural Settlement of Ust-Kansky District

=== Amur Oblast ===
As of 2010, one rural locality in Amur Oblast bears this name:

- Vladimirovka, Amur Oblast, a selo in Ust-Ivanovsky Rural Settlement of Blagoveshchensky District

=== Astrakhan Oblast ===
As of 2010, one rural locality in Astrakhan Oblast bears this name:

- Vladimirovka, Astrakhan Oblast, a selo in Vladimirovsky Selsoviet of Yenotayevsky District

=== Republic of Bashkortostan ===
As of 2010, four rural localities in the Republic of Bashkortostan bear this name:

- Vladimirovka, Blagoveshchensky District, Republic of Bashkortostan, a village in Staronadezhdinsky Selsoviet of Blagoveshchensky District
- Vladimirovka, Buzdyaksky District, Republic of Bashkortostan, a village in Gafuriysky Selsoviet of Buzdyaksky District
- Vladimirovka, Sharansky District, Republic of Bashkortostan, a village in Pisarevsky Selsoviet of Sharansky District
- Vladimirovka, Sterlitamaksky District, Republic of Bashkortostan, a village in Pervomaysky Selsoviet of Sterlitamaksky District

=== Belgorod Oblast ===
As of 2010, three rural localities in Belgorod Oblast bear this name:

- Vladimirovka, Ivnyansky District, Belgorod Oblast, a selo in Ivnyansky District
- Vladimirovka, Starooskolsky District, Belgorod Oblast, a selo in Starooskolsky District
- Vladimirovka, Volokonovsky District, Belgorod Oblast, a khutor in Golofeyevsky Rural Okrug of Volokonovsky District

=== Bryansk Oblast ===
As of 2010, five rural localities in Bryansk Oblast bear this name:

- Vladimirovka, Gordeyevsky District, Bryansk Oblast, a settlement in Smyalchsky Selsoviet of Gordeyevsky District
- Vladimirovka, Komarichsky District, Bryansk Oblast, a settlement in Khlebtovsky Selsoviet of Komarichsky District
- Vladimirovka, Mglinsky District, Bryansk Oblast, a settlement in Velzhichsky Selsoviet of Mglinsky District
- Vladimirovka, Rognedinsky District, Bryansk Oblast, a village in Vladimirovsky Selsoviet of Rognedinsky District
- Vladimirovka, Surazhsky District, Bryansk Oblast, a settlement in Vyukovsky Selsoviet of Surazhsky District

=== Chelyabinsk Oblast ===
As of 2010, one rural locality in Chelyabinsk Oblast bears this name:

- Vladimirovka, Chelyabinsk Oblast, a selo in Kulevchinsky Selsoviet of Varnensky District

=== Irkutsk Oblast ===
As of 2010, one rural locality in Irkutsk Oblast bears this name:

- Vladimirovka, Irkutsk Oblast, a village in Tulunsky District

=== Jewish Autonomous Oblast ===
As of 2010, one rural locality in the Jewish Autonomous Oblast bears this name:

- Vladimirovka, Jewish Autonomous Oblast, a selo in Smidovichsky District

=== Kaliningrad Oblast ===
As of 2010, one rural locality in Kaliningrad Oblast bears this name:

- Vladimirovka, Kaliningrad Oblast, a settlement in Kutuzovsky Rural Okrug of Guryevsky District

=== Khabarovsk Krai ===
As of 2010, two rural localities in Khabarovsk Krai bear this name:

- Vladimirovka, imeni Lazo District, Khabarovsk Krai, a selo in imeni Lazo District
- Vladimirovka, imeni Poliny Osipenko District, Khabarovsk Krai, a selo in imeni Poliny Osipenko District

=== Krasnodar Krai ===
As of 2010, one rural locality in Krasnodar Krai bears this name:

- Vladimirovka, Krasnodar Krai, a selo under the administrative jurisdiction of Primorsky City District of the City of Novorossiysk

=== Krasnoyarsk Krai ===
As of 2010, two rural localities in Krasnoyarsk Krai bear this name:

- Vladimirovka, Bogotolsky District, Krasnoyarsk Krai, a village in Bogotolsky Selsoviet of Bogotolsky District
- Vladimirovka, Nazarovsky District, Krasnoyarsk Krai, a village in Krasnopolyansky Selsoviet of Nazarovsky District

=== Kursk Oblast ===
As of 2010, two rural localities in Kursk Oblast bear this name:

- Vladimirovka, Kastorensky District, Kursk Oblast, a selo in Orekhovsky Selsoviet of Kastorensky District
- Vladimirovka, Pristensky District, Kursk Oblast, a village in Verkhneploskovsky Selsoviet of Pristensky District

=== Leningrad Oblast ===
As of 2010, three rural localities in Leningrad Oblast bear this name:

- Vladimirovka, Lomonosovsky District, Leningrad Oblast, a village in Nizinskoye Settlement Municipal Formation of Lomonosovsky District
- Vladimirovka, Priozersky District, Leningrad Oblast, a logging depot settlement in Gromovskoye Settlement Municipal Formation of Priozersky District
- Vladimirovka, Vyborgsky District, Leningrad Oblast, a logging depot settlement in Polyanskoye Settlement Municipal Formation of Vyborgsky District

=== Lipetsk Oblast ===
As of 2010, one rural locality in Lipetsk Oblast bears this name:

- Vladimirovka, Lipetsk Oblast, a village in Timiryazevsky Selsoviet of Zadonsky District

=== Republic of Mordovia ===
As of 2010, one rural locality in the Republic of Mordovia bears this name:

- Vladimirovka, Republic of Mordovia, a selo in Aleksandrovsky Selsoviet of Lyambirsky District

=== Moscow Oblast ===
As of 2010, three rural localities in Moscow Oblast bear this name:

- Vladimirovka, Klinsky District, Moscow Oblast, a village in Vozdvizhenskoye Rural Settlement of Klinsky District
- Vladimirovka, Lotoshinsky District, Moscow Oblast, a village in Mikulinskoye Rural Settlement of Lotoshinsky District
- Vladimirovka, Ramensky District, Moscow Oblast, a village in Rybolovskoye Rural Settlement of Ramensky District

=== Nizhny Novgorod Oblast ===
As of 2013, five rural localities in Nizhny Novgorod Oblast bear this name:

- Vladimirovka, Diveyevsky District, Nizhny Novgorod Oblast, a village in Diveyevsky Selsoviet of Diveyevsky District
- Vladimirovka, Kstovsky District, Nizhny Novgorod Oblast, a village in Chernukhinsky Selsoviet of Kstovsky District
- Vladimirovka, Lukoyanovsky District, Nizhny Novgorod Oblast, a village in Lopatinsky Selsoviet of Lukoyanovsky District
- Vladimirovka, Lyskovsky District, Nizhny Novgorod Oblast, a village in Berendeyevsky Selsoviet of Lyskovsky District
- Vladimirovka, Pilninsky District, Nizhny Novgorod Oblast, a village in Bolsheandosovsky Selsoviet of Pilninsky District

=== Novgorod Oblast ===
As of 2010, one rural locality in Novgorod Oblast bears this name:

- Vladimirovka, Novgorod Oblast, a village in Gorskoye Settlement of Soletsky District

=== Novosibirsk Oblast ===
As of 2010, two rural localities in Novosibirsk Oblast bear this name:

- Vladimirovka, Bagansky District, Novosibirsk Oblast, a selo in Bagansky District
- Vladimirovka, Toguchinsky District, Novosibirsk Oblast, a selo in Toguchinsky District

=== Omsk Oblast ===
As of 2010, two rural localities in Omsk Oblast bear this name:

- Vladimirovka, Kolosovsky District, Omsk Oblast, a village in Lamanovsky Rural Okrug of Kolosovsky District
- Vladimirovka, Lyubinsky District, Omsk Oblast, a village in Veselopolyansky Rural Okrug of Lyubinsky District

=== Orenburg Oblast ===
As of 2010, three rural localities in Orenburg Oblast bear this name:

- Vladimirovka, Krasnogvardeysky District, Orenburg Oblast, a selo in Zalesovsky Selsoviet of Krasnogvardeysky District
- Vladimirovka, Ponomaryovsky District, Orenburg Oblast, a settlement in Nizhnekuzlinsky Selsoviet of Ponomaryovsky District
- Vladimirovka, Tyulgansky District, Orenburg Oblast, a selo in Chapayevsky Selsoviet of Tyulgansky District

=== Primorsky Krai ===
As of 2010, two rural localities in Primorsky Krai bear this name:

- Vladimirovka, Kirovsky District, Primorsky Krai, a selo in Kirovsky District
- Vladimirovka, Oktyabrsky District, Primorsky Krai, a selo in Oktyabrsky District

=== Ryazan Oblast ===
As of 2010, two rural localities in Ryazan Oblast bear this name:

- Vladimirovka, Korablinsky District, Ryazan Oblast, a village in Amanovsky Rural Okrug of Korablinsky District
- Vladimirovka, Alexandro-Nevsky District, Ryazan Oblast, a village in Blagovsky Rural Okrug of Alexandro-Nevsky District

=== Sakha Republic ===
As of 2010, one rural locality in the Sakha Republic bears this name:

- Vladimirovka, Sakha Republic, a selo in Khatassky Rural Okrug of Yakutsk

=== Sakhalin Oblast ===
As of 2010, one rural locality in Sakhalin Oblast bears this name:

- Vladimirovka, Sakhalin Oblast, a selo in Alexandrovsk-Sakhalinsky District

=== Samara Oblast ===
As of 2010, five rural localities in Samara Oblast bear this name:

- Vladimirovka, Bezenchuksky District, Samara Oblast, a selo in Bezenchuksky District
- Vladimirovka, Isaklinsky District, Samara Oblast, a village in Isaklinsky District
- Vladimirovka, Khvorostyansky District, Samara Oblast, a selo in Khvorostyansky District
- Vladimirovka, Klyavlinsky District, Samara Oblast, a village in Klyavlinsky District
- Vladimirovka, Yelkhovsky District, Samara Oblast, a village in Yelkhovsky District

=== Saratov Oblast ===
As of 2010, four rural localities in Saratov Oblast bear this name:

- Vladimirovka, Krasnokutsky District, Saratov Oblast, a selo in Krasnokutsky District
- Vladimirovka, Novouzensky District, Saratov Oblast, a khutor in Novouzensky District
- Vladimirovka, Pugachyovsky District, Saratov Oblast, a selo in Pugachyovsky District
- Vladimirovka, Yekaterinovsky District, Saratov Oblast, a village in Yekaterinovsky District

=== Smolensk Oblast ===
As of 2010, two rural localities in Smolensk Oblast bear this name:

- Vladimirovka, Khislavichsky District, Smolensk Oblast, a village in Vladimirovskoye Rural Settlement of Khislavichsky District
- Vladimirovka, Pochinkovsky District, Smolensk Oblast, a village in Lysovskoye Rural Settlement of Pochinkovsky District

=== Stavropol Krai ===
As of 2010, two rural localities in Stavropol Krai bear this name:

- Vladimirovka, Levokumsky District, Stavropol Krai, a selo in Vladimirovsky Selsoviet of Levokumsky District
- Vladimirovka, Turkmensky District, Stavropol Krai, a settlement in Vladimirovsky Selsoviet of Turkmensky District

=== Sverdlovsk Oblast ===
As of 2010, one rural locality in Sverdlovsk Oblast bears this name:

- Vladimirovka, Sverdlovsk Oblast, a village in Tavdinsky District

=== Tambov Oblast ===
As of 2010, one rural locality in Tambov Oblast bears this name:

- Vladimirovka, Tambov Oblast, a village in Troitsky Selsoviet of Muchkapsky District

=== Republic of Tatarstan ===
As of 2010, three rural localities in the Republic of Tatarstan bear this name:

- Vladimirovka, Aksubayevsky District, Republic of Tatarstan, a village in Aksubayevsky District
- Vladimirovka, Almetyevsky District, Republic of Tatarstan, a village in Almetyevsky District
- Vladimirovka, Aznakayevsky District, Republic of Tatarstan, a village in Aznakayevsky District

=== Tula Oblast ===
As of 2010, three rural localities in Tula Oblast bear this name:

- Vladimirovka, Bogoroditsky District, Tula Oblast, a village in Malevsky Rural Okrug of Bogoroditsky District
- Vladimirovka, Kimovsky District, Tula Oblast, a village in Aleksandrovsky Rural Okrug of Kimovsky District
- Vladimirovka, Kireyevsky District, Tula Oblast, a village in Bogucharovsky Rural Okrug of Kireyevsky District

=== Tuva Republic ===
As of 2010, one rural locality in the Tuva Republic bears this name:

- Vladimirovka, Tuva Republic, a selo in Aryg-Bazhy Sumon (Rural Settlement) of Tandinsky District

=== Vladimir Oblast ===
As of 2010, one rural locality in Vladimir Oblast bears this name:

- Vladimirovka, Vladimir Oblast, a village in Sobinsky District

=== Vologda Oblast ===
As of 2010, one rural locality in Vologda Oblast bears this name:

- Vladimirovka, Vologda Oblast, a village in Sudsky Selsoviet of Cherepovetsky District

=== Voronezh Oblast ===
As of 2010, six rural localities in Voronezh Oblast bear this name:

- Vladimirovka, Ertilsky District, Voronezh Oblast, a settlement in Pervoertilskoye Rural Settlement of Ertilsky District
- Vladimirovka, Liskinsky District, Voronezh Oblast, a selo in Petropavlovskoye Rural Settlement of Liskinsky District
- Vladimirovka, Novokhopyorsky District, Voronezh Oblast, a settlement in Pykhovskoye Rural Settlement of Novokhopyorsky District
- Vladimirovka, Ostrogozhsky District, Voronezh Oblast, a khutor in Dalnepolubyanskoye Rural Settlement of Ostrogozhsky District
- Vladimirovka, Rossoshansky District, Voronezh Oblast, a khutor in Lizinovskoye Rural Settlement of Rossoshansky District
- Vladimirovka, Verkhnekhavsky District, Voronezh Oblast, a settlement in Maloprivalovskoye Rural Settlement of Verkhnekhavsky District

== Renamed localities ==
- Vladimirovka, name of Yuzhno-Sakhalinsk, Russia in 1882–1905

== Abolished localities ==
- Vladimirovka, Perevozsky District, Nizhny Novgorod Oblast, a former rural locality (a village) in Dzerzhinsky Selsoviet of Perevozsky District, Nizhny Novgorod Oblast; abolished in July 2013
