= List of MiG-27 operators =

List of countries operating the MiG-27 attack aircraft

This is a list of Mikoyan-Gurevich MiG-27 operators. As of late 2023, the MiG-27 has been fully retired.

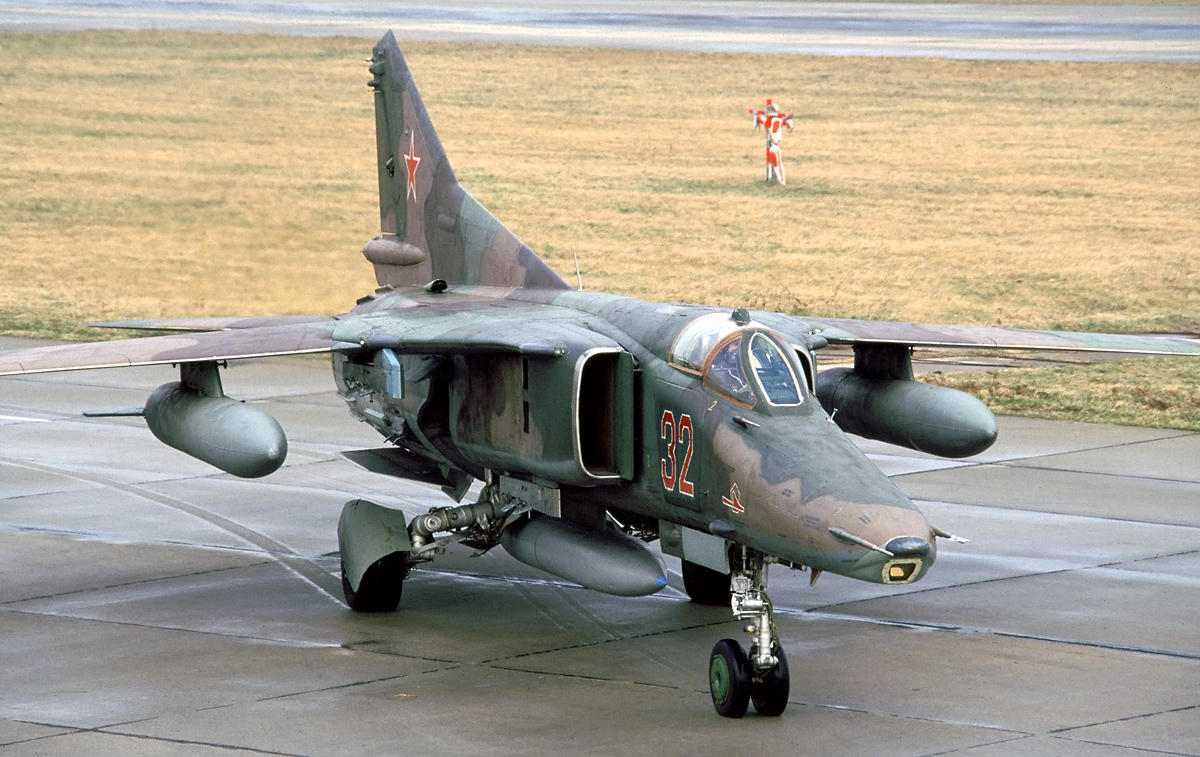
MiG-27 of the Soviet Air Force

== Operators ==
As of 2023, the MiG-27 has been fully retired from active military service.

=== Belarus ===
The Belarusian Air Force inherited a small number of MiG-27s of the 911th APIB, based at Lida, after the dissolution of the Soviet Union. These aircraft were scrapped at Baranovichi.

- 911th APIB at Lida, MiG-27K

=== India ===
The Indian Air Force operated the largest MiG-27 fleet (165 aircraft) outside the Soviet Union from 1988 to 2020.

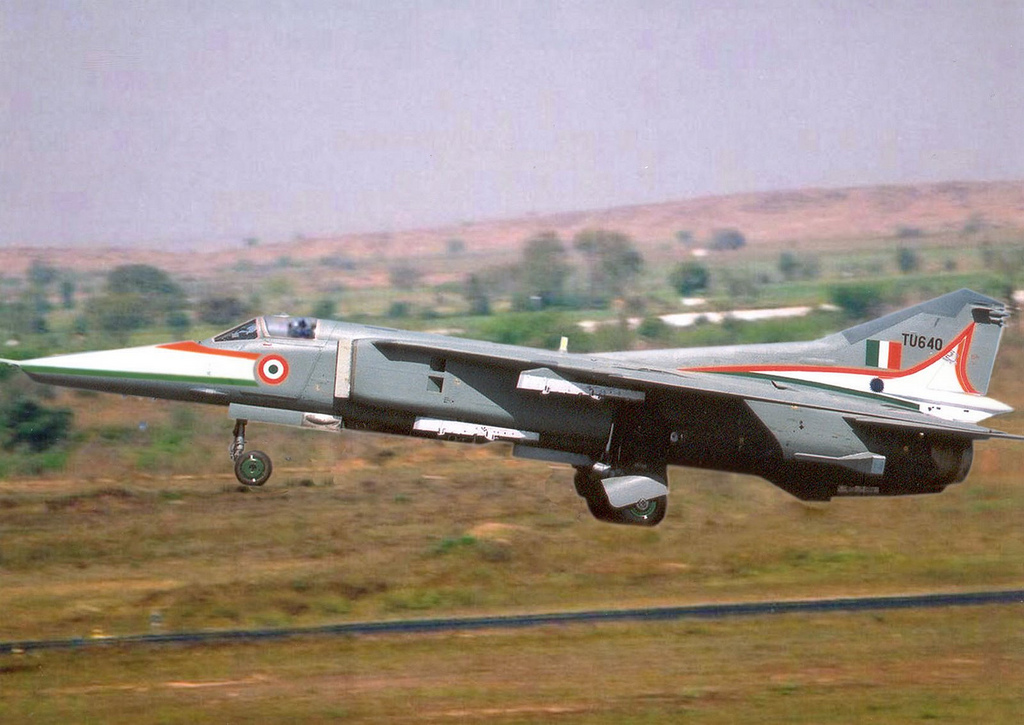
Indian MiG-27 taking off

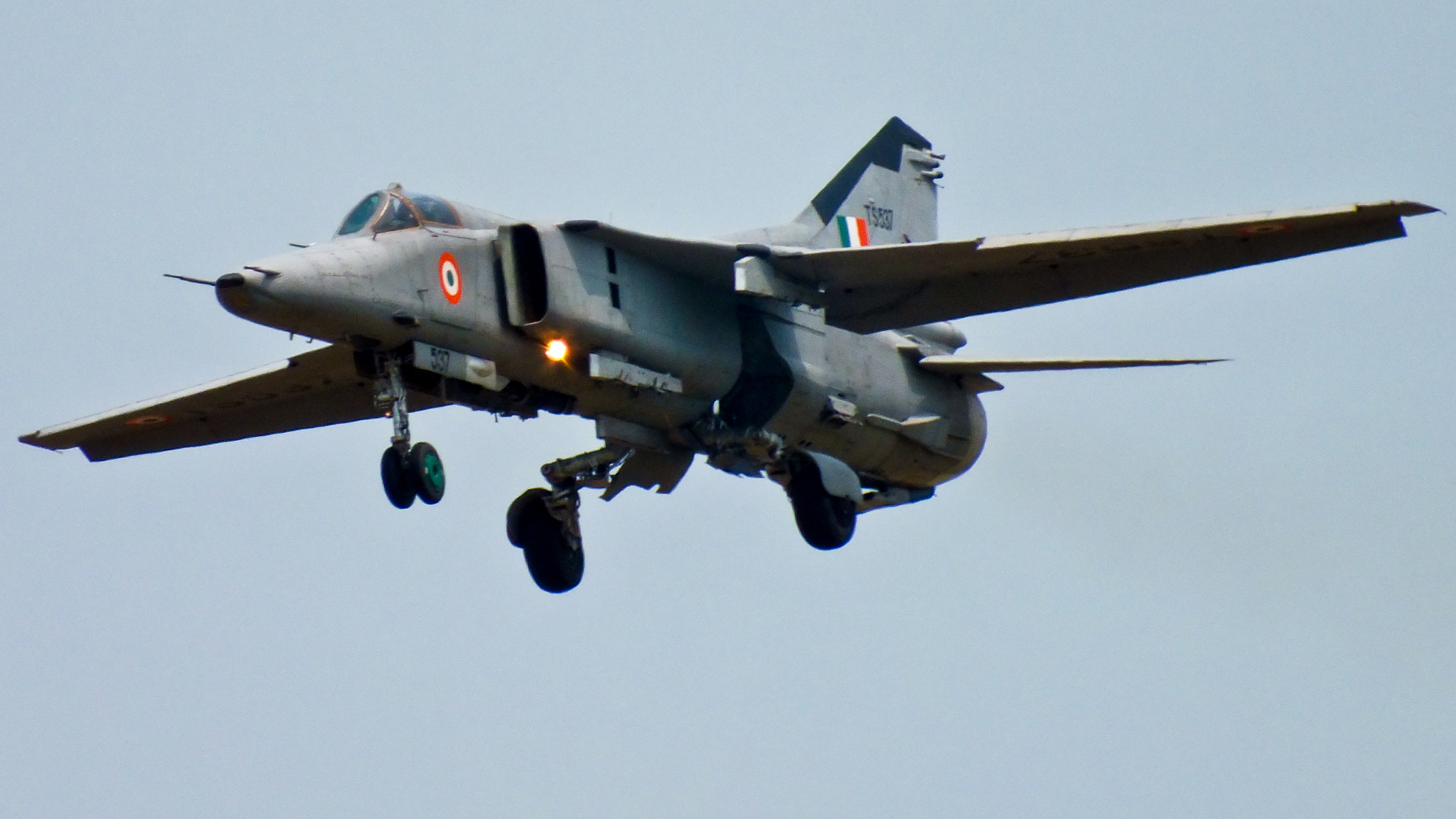
MiG-27 from No. 18 Squadron IAF

- Eastern Air Command
  - No.2 Squadron 'Winged Arrows', Kalaikunda
  - No.9 Squadron 'Wolfpack', Hindan
  - No.10 Squadron 'Daggers', Jodhpur
  - No.18 Squadron 'Flying Bullets', Hindon, moved to Kalaikunda in 1996
  - No.22 Squadron, 'Swifts', Hasimara
  - No. 29 Squadron 'Black Scorpions', Jodhpur
  - No. 222 Squadron 'Tigersharks', Hasimara
  - Aircraft and Systems Testing Establishment, Bengaluru
  - Tactics and Air Combat Development Establishment, Jamnagar

=== Kazakhstan ===
The Kazakhstan Air Force operated 12 MiG-27s until 2023, when they were retired, and put up for auction. In April 2024, it was reported that 81 aircraft were sold to the USA and were speculated to be transferred to Ukraine for use as spare parts sources and/or decoys. In a later statement, the Kazakh state-owned weapons importer and exporter Kazspetexport denied such claims, saying that foreign companies were not allowed to bid.

- 129th APIB - Soviet Air Force regiment operating MiG-27s from Taldykorgan Air Base in Kazakh territory when the Soviet Union collapsed, MiG-27M
- 134th APIB - Another Soviet unit based at Zhangiztobe Air Base, MiG-27M
- 60th IAP
- 604th Aviation Base at Taldykorgan, formed out of the 60th, 129th and 134th regiments, MiG-27M

=== Russia ===
The Russian Air Force inherited most of the remaining MiG-27s after the collapse of the USSR. However, these were quickly retired in favour of the Su-24 and Su-25.

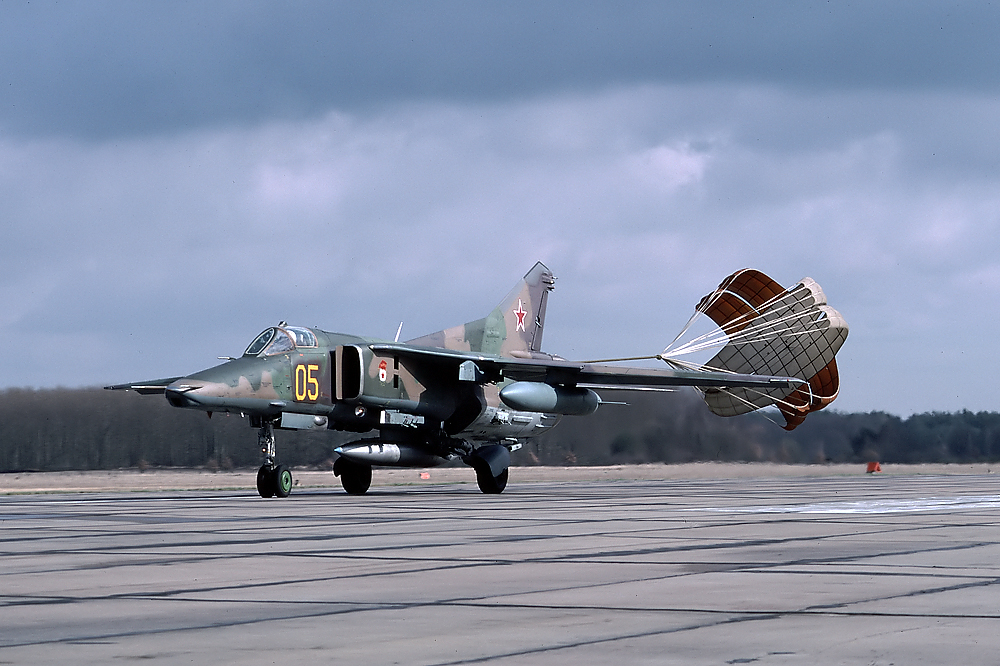
A Russian Air Force machine in Lärz, Germany

=== USSR ===
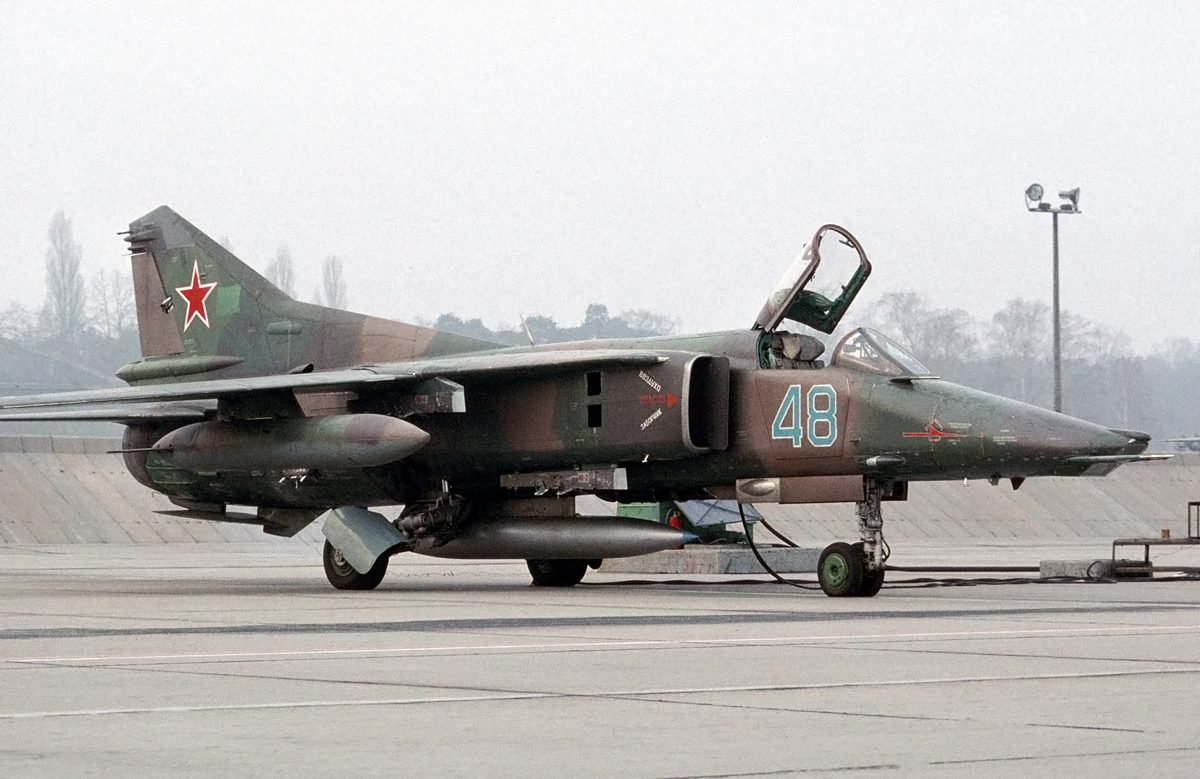
MiG-27 (12142275643)

==== Direct Reporting Units ====
- 4th TsBP, Lipetsk
  - 91st IISAP, Lipetsk-2
  - 760th IIAPIB, Lipetsk-2
- 1080th UATs PLS, Borisoglebsk
  - 707th IAPIB / 1st GvIAPIB, Lebyazhye
- GNIKI VVS, Akhtubinsk
  - 333rd OIAP, Vladimirovka?
    - 929th GLITs
- 4020th BRS, Lipetsk-2
- 4215th BRS, Dmitriyevka

==== Baltic Military District ====
- 15th Air Army (Latvian Soviet Socialist Republic), Riga
  - 53rd GvAPIB, Šiauliai, Lithuanian Soviet Socialist Republic
  - 88th APIB, Suurkyul, Estonian Soviet Socialist Republic
  - 321st APIB, Suurkyul
  - 372nd APIB, Lotsaki, Daugavpils, Latvian Soviet Socialist Republic
  - 899th APIB, Lielvārde

==== Belorussian Military District ====
- 26th Air Army, Minsk
  - 1st GvADIB
    - 911th APIB, Lida (transferred to Western Group of Forces 1989)
    - 940th APIB, Postavy Air Base

==== Carpathian Military District ====
- 15th Air Army
  - 289th ADIB, L'vov
    - 236th APIB, Chortkiv
    - 314th APIB, Cherlyany

==== Central Asian Military District ====
- 73rd Air Army, Tashkent
  - 10th IAD, Ucharal
    - 134th APIB, Zhangiztobe
  - 24th SAD, Taldy-Kurgan
    - 129th APIB, Taldy-Kurgan

==== Far Eastern Military District ====
- 1st Air Army, Khabarovsk
  - 33rd ADIB
    - 300th APIB, Pereyaslavka
  - 303rd ADIB, Ussuriysk
    - 18th 'Vitebskiy' GvIAP, Galyonki
    - 224th APIB, Ozornaya Pad

==== Kiev Military District ====
- 17th Air Army, Kiev
  - 88th APIB, Kanatovo

==== Leningrad Military District ====
- 76th Air Army, Leningrad
  - 722nd OIBAP/OAPIB, Smuravyevo

==== Odessa Military District ====
- 5th Air Army, Odessa
  - 642nd GvOIBAP/GVOAPIB, Matynovka Air Base, Voznesensk

==== Transbaikal Military District ====
- 23rd Air Army, Chita
  - 30th ADIB, Step
    - 58th IBAP/APIB, Step
    - 266th APIB, Step

==== Volga Military District ====
- 281st IAPIB, Totskoye-2

==== Central Group of Forces (Czechoslovakia) ====
- 131st SAD, Milovice
  - 236th APIB, Hradčany-Mimoň

==== Southern Group of Forces ====
- 36th Air Army, Budapest
- 1st GvAPIB, Kunmadaras
- 88th GvAPIB, Debrecen (both this unit and the 1st GvAPIB reported directly to HQ Southern Group in Budapest)

==== Western Group of Forces ====
- 16th Air Army, Wünsdorf
  - 105th APIB, Großenhain
    - 296th APIB, Altenburg, moved to Großenhain
    - 559th 'Mozyrskiy' APIB, Fürstenwalde
    - 911th APIB, Brand (later withdrawn to Lida, Belarus)
  - 125th GvADIB, Rechlin
    - 19th GvAPIB, Lärz

==== Group of Soviet Forces in Mongolia ====
- 23rd Air Army, Choibolsan
  - 44th SAK, Choibolsan
    - 29th ADIB, Choibolsan
      - 266th APIB, Nalaïh

==== Soviet Naval Aviation ====
- Northern Fleet
  - 88th OMAPIB

=== Sri Lanka ===
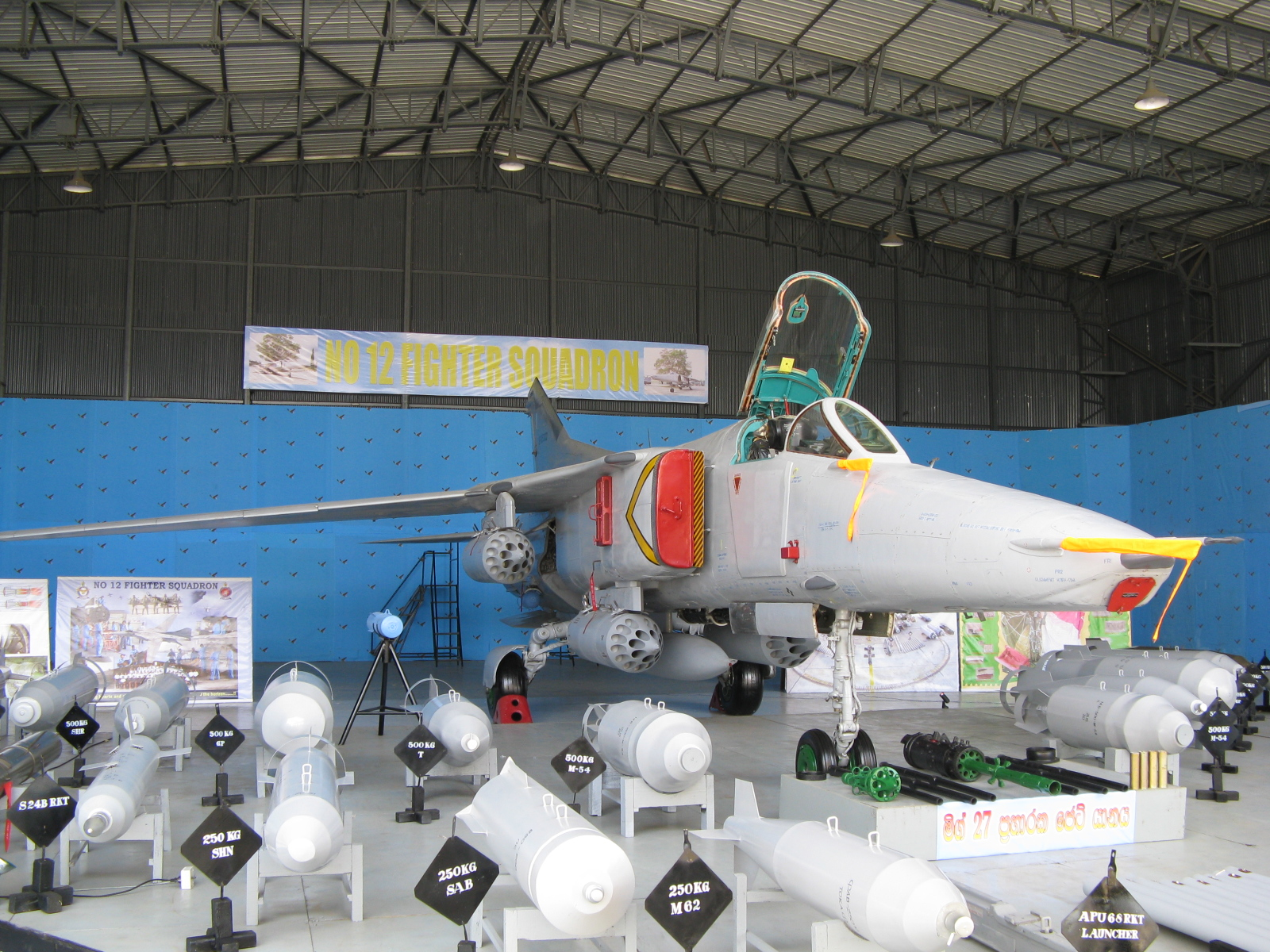
Sri Lankan Air Force MiG-27

The Sri Lankan Air Force (SLAF) purchased five MiG-27s from Ukraine in 2000. These were used in the Sri Lankan Civil War.

- No.5 Squadron, Katunayake
- No.12 Squadron, Colombo

=== Ukraine ===
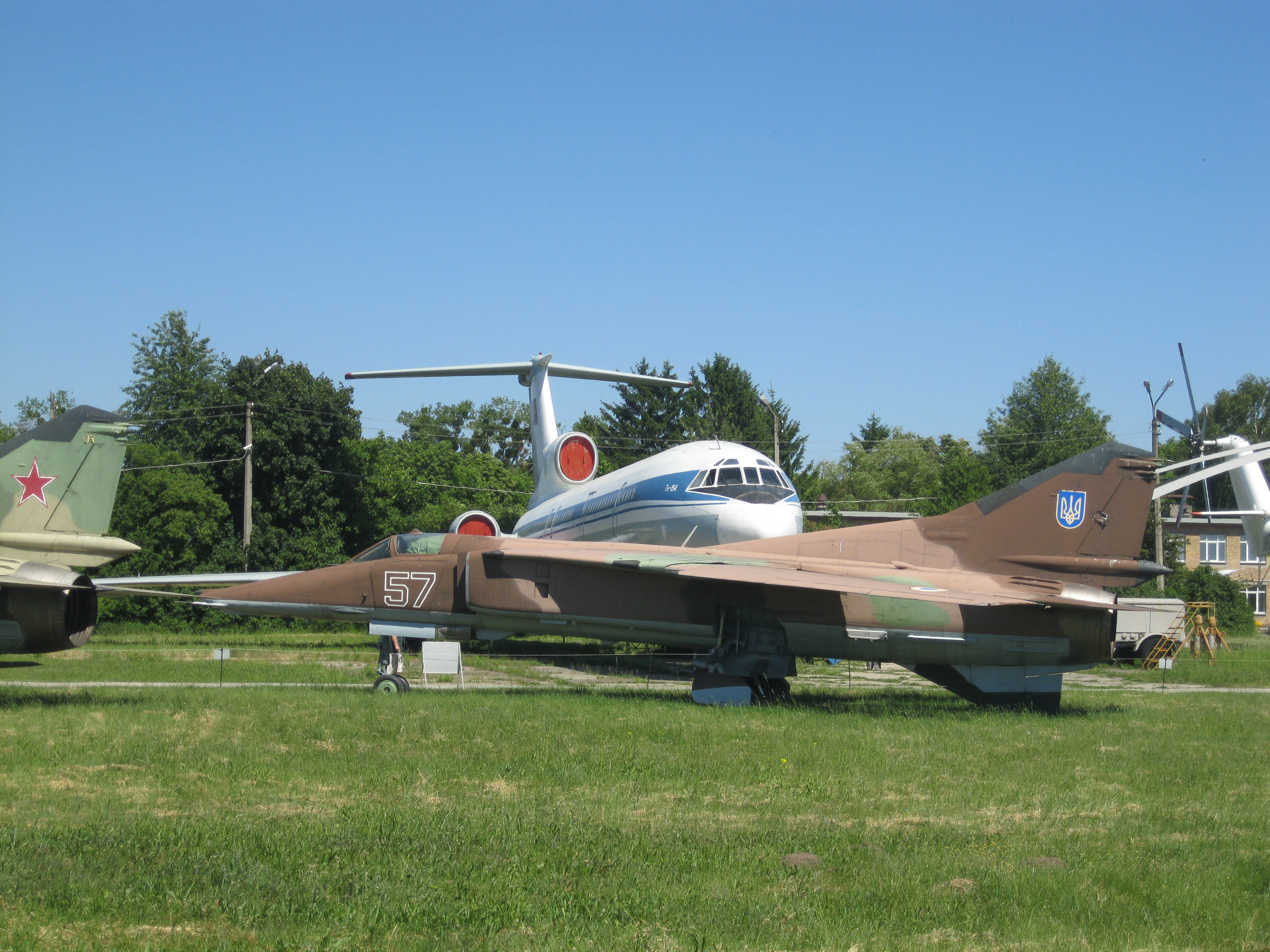
Ukrainian MiG-27

Although the Soviet Air Force had not based any MiG-27 regiments in Ukraine, when the Soviet Union fell 49 MiG-27s of various models were undergoing maintenance in Ukraine.

- 117th ARZ, Lvіv-Sknyliv
- 562nd ARZ, Odesa
- 536th ARZ, Chuhuiv
- 805th ARZ, Dnipro
- 6221st BLAT, Ovruch

== Bibliography ==
- Gordon, Y. and Komissarov, D., 'Mikoyan MiG-23 & MiG-27', Crecy Publishing, Manchester, 2019 ISBN 978-1-910809-31-0
