= Kupino =

Kupino (Russian: Купино) may refer to:

Urban localities

- Kupino, Novosibirsk Oblast, a town in Kupinsky District of Novosibirsk Oblast

Rural localities

- Kupino, Belgorod Oblast, a selo in Shebekinsky District of Belgorod Oblast
- Kupino, Samara Oblast, a selo in Bezenchuksky District of Samara Oblast

Other

- Kupino (air base)
