= 940th Fighter-Bomber Aviation Regiment =

Air Force Regiment

940th Fighter-Bomber Aviation Regiment (1960–1988) 940th Fighter Aviation Regiment (1942–1960)
- Active: 1942–1988
- Country: Soviet Union
- Branch: Soviet Air Force
- Type: Aviation Regiment
- Garrison/HQ: Postavy
- Engagements: World War II: Soviet invasion of Manchuria; Korean War

Commanders
- Notable commanders: Lev Schukin

Aircraft flown
- MiG-15 MiG-17; Su-7 MiG-27

The 940th Fighter-Bomber Aviation Regiment (940th IBAP/APIB since 1976) was an aviation regiment of the Soviet Air Force. It was formed in 1942 in the Soviet Far East and fought in the Soviet invasion of Manchuria. During the last months of the Korean War, the regiment was relocated to China, but did not fight in combat due to the end of the war. After the end of the latter it was transferred to Belarus, where it served for the remainder of the Cold War, being converted into a fighter-bomber regiment in 1960.

== History ==
=== World War II ===
The 940th Fighter Aviation Regiment (IAP) was formed on 5 August 1942 at the 3rd Rail Siding airfield in Chita Oblast from the personnel of the 24th Reserve Aviation Regiment and 541st Short-Range Bomber Aviation Regiment, equipped with the then-obsolete Polikarpov I-16 fighter. The regiment was part of the 245th Fighter Aviation Division of the Air Force of the Transbaikal Front. Ten days after its formation, the 245th became part of the 12th Air Army in the same front. On 5 December, the regimental commander led a detachment transferring to the Eastern Front, where it became part of the 160th Fighter Aviation Regiment. The 245th transferred to the 9th Air Army on 8 July 1943. In November, the division became part of the 12th Air Army again, and a month later, the regiment received newer Yakovlev Yak-9 fighters.

On 14 April 1945, Colonel Pavel Dolzhenko took command of the regiment, which he led until 25 January 1947. From August 1945, the regiment was based in Mongolia. On 8 August, it had 38 Yak-9s and fought in the Soviet Invasion of Manchuria, which began the next day. During the Soviet invasion of Manchuria, which ended on 3 September, the regiment flew 256 sorties, 59 of which provided air cover from ground troops, 4 to escort transport planes, 67 reconnaissance, and 126 against Japanese airfields. The 940th did not see air combat, and lost a Yak-9 and a Yakovlev Yak-7V in operational accidents.

=== Postwar ===
On 24 September, the 245th was transferred back to the 9th Air Army in the Primorsky Military District. On 1 October, it was moved to Dalian. From July to September 1946, the regiment was reequipped with Lend-lease Bell P-63 Kingcobra aircraft. The regiment became part of the 153rd Fighter Aviation Division in February 1949. It became part of the 37th Fighter Aviation Division in November 1950 and moved to Lüshunkou. In 1952, it received Mikoyan-Gurevich MiG-15 jet fighters. The regiment moved to Mukden in June 1953, to become part of the 64th Fighter Aviation Corps, which oversaw Soviet air units involved in the Korean War. The regiment was commanded by Lieutenant Colonel Titov at this time. The regiment did not see combat action in the Korean War, as its inexperienced pilots were still being trained when the armistice was signed on 27 July.

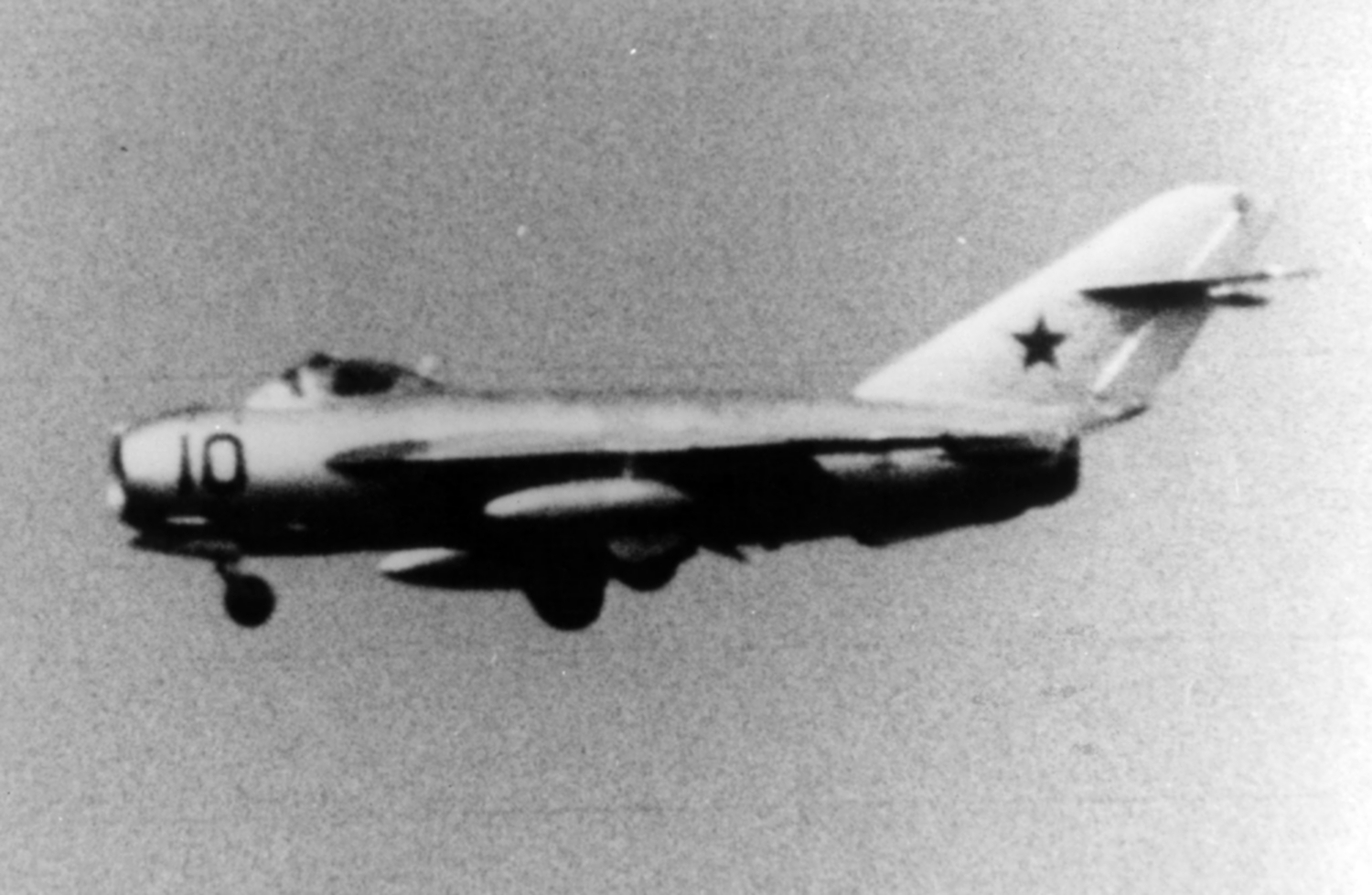
A MiG-17 of the type flown by the 940th for more than 20 years

In June 1954, it was moved to Ross, Grodno Oblast in Belarus and became part of the 95th Fighter Aviation Division. In 1955, the MiG-15s were replaced with the Mikoyan-Gurevich MiG-17. On 18 March 1960, the regiment was converted to a Fighter-Bomber Aviation Regiment and transferred to the 1st Guards Fighter-Bomber Aviation Division. It also changed its base to Postavy. Between 1962 and 1967 it was commanded by former deputy commander and highly decorated Korean War flying ace Lev Schukin. In 1976, the regiment received Sukhoi Su-7B and Su-7BMK aircraft. In 1979, it received its first Su-7BKL aircraft. In 1982, the Su-7s were replaced with Mikoyan MiG-27D and MiG-27M aircraft. The regiment was disbanded in May 1988. Its aircraft and equipment were transferred to the 129th Fighter-Bomber Aviation Regiment.

== Aircraft operated ==
Aircraft operated by 940th IAP (940th IBAP from 1960, APIB from 1976), data from
From	To	Aircraft	Version
August 1942	1944	Polikarpov I-16	
December 1944	1946	Yakovlev Yak-9	
July 1946	1952	Bell P-63 Kingcobra	
1952	1955	Mikoyan-Gurevich MiG-15	
1955	1976	Mikoyan-Gurevich MiG-17	
1976	1982	Sukhoi Su-7	Su-7B/BMK
1979	1982	Sukhoi Su-7	Su-7BKL
1982	1988	Mikoyan-Gurevich MiG-27	MiG-27D/M
