= Tatarenko =

Tatarenko (Russian: Татаренко, Ukrainian: Татаренко) is a surname of Slavic-language origin. Notable people with this surname include:

- Alexander Tatarenko (1925 - 1999), Russian painter, restorer, and art teacher
- Alexander Tatarenko (general) (born 1960), Russian lieutenant general
