= 14th Air and Air Defence Forces Army =

14th Air and Air Defence Forces Army (1998–2009, 2015–present) 2nd Air and Air Defence Forces Command (2009–2015)
- Active: 1998–2009; 2015–present
- Country: Russia
- Branch: Russian Air Force
- Type: Air army
- Part of: Central Military District
- Garrison/HQ: Yekaterinburg

Commanders
- Current commander: Major General Vladimir Sergeyevich Melnikov
- Notable commanders: Alexander Zelin; Viktor Bondarev

The 14th Air and Air Defence Forces Army (Russian: 14-я армия ВВС и ПВО) is an air army of the Russian Aerospace Forces, part of the Central Military District and headquartered at Yekaterinburg.

It was formed in 1998 from the 14th Independent Air Defence Army when the Russian Air Force was reorganized to combine both Air Force and Air Defence Forces units.

It was redesignated as the 2nd Air and Air Defence Forces Command when the Russian Air Force reorganized its armies into commands in 2009, but returned to its original name in 2015 when the commands became armies again.

== History ==
In the summer and fall of 1948, for the defence of strategic targets within Soviet territory, air defence districts were created, which included the Omsk and Novosibirsk Air Defence Districts, referred to as districts of the 3rd category. In a July 1952 reorganization by directive of the Commander of the Air Defence Forces, the area of responsibility of the Novosibirsk Air Defence District was somewhat expanded, becoming an Air Defence District of the 3rd category. As a result, 1 July 1952 became considered the date of formation of the Novosibirsk air defence units.

On 1 May 1953, with the elimination of the Omsk Air Defence District headquarters during reorganization, the Novosibirsk Air Defence District included 3,900 personnel and 170 anti-aircraft guns in two anti-aircraft regiments. During reorganization in July and August 1954 the Novosibirsk Air Defence District became the Novosibirsk Air Defence Division. In accordance with a 19 March 1956 Central Committee of the Communist Party of the Soviet Union decree directing the strengthening of air defence in Siberia and the Urals, in addition to the interceptor air defence units, dozens of radio-technical and surface-to-air missile units were formed, and along the northern Arctic Ocean coast a network of long-range radar stations was created to detect enemy aviation. In accordance with a 2 October 1956 directive of the General Staff, the Novosibirsk Air Defence Division was reorganized as the Novosibirsk Air Defence Corps, which included the 186th Amur Fighter Aviation Division PVO.

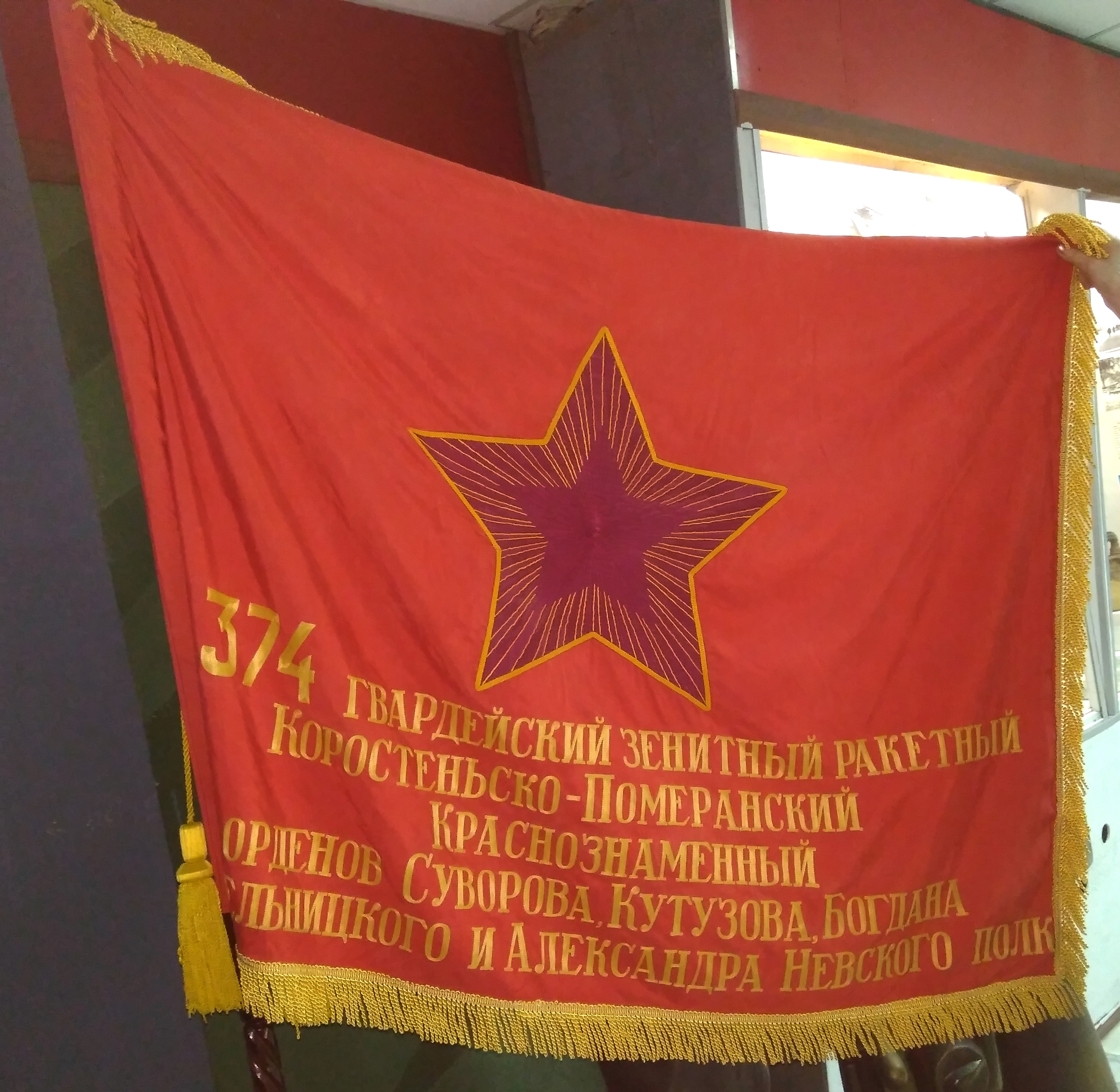
Battle flag of the 374th Guards Anti-Aircraft Rocket Regiment, 33rd Air Defence Division, from its time serving in the Central Asian Military District.

During the spring and summer of 1960, the headquarters of the corps was reorganized into that of the 14th Independent Air Defence Army (14-й Краснознамённая армия ПВО). The new army included the 20th Amur Air Defence Division at Tolmachevo near Novosibirsk, formed from the 186th, the 26th Mukden Air Defence Division in Irkutsk, formed from the 246th Fighter Aviation Division PVO, and the new 33rd Air Defence Division at Semipalatinsk. The 20th Air Defence Division controlled units from western Siberia east to Krasnoyarsk Krai, the 26th Air Defence Division was responsible for air defence units based in Irkutsk, Chita, and Yakutia, and the 33rd Air Defence Division was responsible for air defence units based in Omsk Oblast and northeast Kazakhstan. The army was expanded in 1969 by the creation of the 22nd Air Defence Division headquarters at Norilsk to take over control of the radar station network along the northern Arctic coast.

As a result of the 1980 reorganization, the army included the 38th and 39th Air Defence Corps and the 22nd Air Defence Division. In spring 1980, the 33rd Air Defence Division headquarters was relocated to the Transbaikal Military District and the units formerly part of the division fell under the new 56th Air Defence Corps at Semipalatinsk, which became part of the Central Asian Military District. During the same reorganization, the 20th and 26th Air Defence Divisions became the 38th and 39th Air Defence Corps, respectively. The responsibilities of the 39th Air Defence Corps were accordingly changed to Irkutsk, Yakutsk, and Krasnoyarsk. In spring 1986, the 56th Air Defence Corps at Semipalatinsk returned to control of the army. The 39th Air Defence Corps reverted to division status as the 94th Air Defence Division in spring 1988. The 50th Guards Air Defence Corps at Atamanovka, responsible for Transbaikalia, became part of the army in early 1989 after the Soviet withdrawal from Mongolia.

In 1988 five fighter regiments were part of the army.

Fighter Regiments of the 14th Army PVO 1988 (Source Feskov et al. 2004)

Regiment	Base	Equipment	Remarks
64th Fighter Aviation Regiment	Omsk-Chakalovsky	MiG-31	56th Air Defence Corps
350th Fighter Aviation Regiment	Bratsk	MiG-31	Formed 1945
356th Fighter Aviation Regiment PVO	Zhaneysmey (Semipalatinsk Airport)	MiG-31	Formed March 1944; 56th Air Defence Corps.
712th Guards Fighter Aviation Regiment	Kansk	Sukhoi Su-15	39 ADC (became 94 ADD February 1988)
849th Fighter Aviation Regiment PVO	Kupino	MiG-23MLD	38th Air Defence Corps

Also in 1988 as part of the army was the 197th independent Transport Aviation Regiment at Tolmachevo Airport outside Novosibirsk in Novosibirsk Oblast. It flew An-12/24/26, and Mi-8s. The regiment had been formed as the 43rd independent Transport Aviation Squadron in 1969, and was upgraded into a regiment in 1988. It survived until May 1998, but was downgraded again into a squadron in 1996.

In accordance with a December 1994 directive, the 14th Independent Air Defence Army was reorganized as the 6th Independent Air Defence Corps.

=== 14th Air and Air Defence Forces Army ===
The 14th Air and Air Defence Forces Army (14 A VVS i PVO) traces its lineage to the Novosibirsk Air Defence Division (March 1954); the Novosibirsk Air Defence Corps (11/15/1956); the 14th Independent Air Defence Army (3/24/1960); and then the 6th Independent Air Defence Corps (ru:6-й_отдельный_корпус_ПВО)(6/10/1994). The 6th Independent Corps comprised the 16th Guards, 20th, and 94th Mukden Air Defence Divisions.

The 14th Air and Air Defence Forces Army was formed in 1998, from the 6th Independent Air Defence Corps of the Russian Air Defence Forces at Novosibirsk; the 23rd Air Army of the Russian Air Forces from Chita; and the 50th Independent Air Defence Corps also from Chita. The new army was given the title of 14th Army of the Air Force and Air Defence. Its zone of responsibility covered the huge area of the Siberian Military District, Air Forces Monthly (AFM) said, and its headquarters was located in Novosibirsk. AFM also said that the aircraft were concentrated in the southern part of the territory, along the border with Kazakhstan and Mongolia. In 2007 the commander of the new army, AFM also reported, was General-Lieutenant Nikolay Danilov.

The 50th Guards Air Defence Corps was consolidated into the 26th Guards Air Defence Division in November 1998.

The most important force, AFM noted, within the army was the 21st Composite Air Division (21st SAD), which operated a Sukhoi Su-24M tactical bomber regiment, a Su-24MR reconnaissance regiment and a Su-25 attack aircraft regiment. The 21st SAD appears to date from the establishment of the 21st Bomber Aviation Division (Military Unit Number 17954) as part of the 23rd Air Army in 1979 at Dzhida. The division was stationed in the eastern part of the army's area of responsibility, near the Chinese border.

The army was disbanded in 2009 by being redesignated as the 2nd Air and Air Defence Forces Command.

The 21st Separate Aviation Division amalgamated with 2 BAP circa 2010 to become the 6980th Guards Aviation Base of the 1st Rank. The new base (Military Unit Number 69806) was equipped with Sukhoi Su-24M bombers and Su-24MR reconnaissance aircraft and stationed at Chelyabinsk Shagol Airport.

The army was reformed in August 2015. Lieutenant General Alexander Tatarenko took command in January 2016. Tatarenko was released from duty and dismissed from military service upon reaching the age limit in August 2020.

Over three years later, Tatarenko was reported as killed by Ukrainian media during a missile strike on Belbek air base in Crimea on 30-31 January 2024, but this has not been independently confirmed. Despite having been dismissed from military service over three years before, Tatarenko may have been commanding the Belbek airbase in the Russian-occupied Crimea.

== Commanders ==
- Lieutenant General Valery Nechayev (June 1998–December 2000)
- Lieutenant General Aleksandr Zelin (December 2000–June 2001)
- Lieutenant General Nikolay Danilov (June 2001–July 2007)
- Lieutenant General Aleksandr Belevich (July 2007–June 2008)
- Lieutenant General Viktor Bondarev (June 2008–August 2009)
- Lieutenant General Viktor Sevostyanov (August 2015–January 2016)
- Lieutenant General Aleksandr Tatarenko† (12 January 2016–August 2020)
- Major General Vladimir Melnikov (August 2020–present)

== Structure ==
=== Structure 2007 ===
- 14th Air and Air Defence Forces Army - Novosibirsk
  - 21st Composite Aviation Division - HQ at Dzhida;
    - 2nd Bomber Aviation Regiment - HQ at Dzhida - Su-24M;
    - 266th Assault Aviation Regiment - HQ at Step, Olovyannaya - Su-25;
    - 313th Reconnaissance Aviation Regiment - HQ at Bada - Su-24MR;
  - 120th Guards Fighter Aviation Regiment - HQ at Domna - MiG-29;
  - 712th Guards Fighter Aviation Regiment - HQ at Kansk - MiG-25PU, MiG-31;
  - 137th Independent Composite Aviation Squadron - HQ at Novosibirsk Tolmachevo Airport - An-26;
  - Army Aviation component
    - 337th Independent Helicopter Regiment - HQ at Berdsk (later at Tolmachevo) - Mi-8, Mi-24;
    - 112th Independent Helicopter Regiment - HQ at Chita - Mi-8, Mi-24;
  - Two SAM regiments and four radar units

=== Structure 2020-21 ===
- Headquarters 14th Air and Air Defence Forces Army - Yekaterinburg
  - 21st Guards Composite Aviation Division (HQ: Chelyabinsk Shagol airbase)
    - 712th Guards Fighter Aviation Regiment; Two Squadrons: MiG-31BM Fighters (Kansk-Yuzhniy air base), to receive MiG-31K till 2024
    - 764th Fighter Aviation Regiment; Two Squadrons: MiG-31BM/BSM Fighters (Perm air base)
    - 2nd Guards Mixed Aviation Regiment (ru:2-й_гвардейский_смешанный_авиационный_полк); One squadron: Su-24MR Fencer strike aircraft; Two squadrons: Su-34 strike fighters (Chelyabinsk Shagol airbase), to receive three squadrons of Su-34
  - 999th Aviation Base (Kant airbase, Kyrgyzstan; directly subordinate to 14th Air and Air Defence Forces Army); One Squadron: Sukhoi Su-25SM "Frogfoot" aircraft
  - 76th Air Defence Division (HQ: Samara)
    - 185th Anti-Aircraft Missile Regiment (Beryozovsky): S-400 surface-to-air missile system.
    - 511th Guards Anti-Aircraft Missile Regiment (Engels air base): S-400/Pantsir surface-to-air missiles
    - 568th Anti-Aircraft Regiment (Samara): S-300PS SAMs
  - 28th Anti-Aircraft Missile Brigade (Mirny): S-300V4 SAMs
  - 41st Air Defence Division (HQ: Novosibirsk)
    - 590th Anti-Aircraft Missile Regiment (Novosibirsk): S-400/Pantsir SAMs
    - 388th Anti-Aircraft Missile Regiment (Achinsk): S-300P SAMs (may be upgrading to PM2 variant as of November 2021)
    - 24th Anti-Aircraft Missile Brigade (Abakan): S-300P? SAMs
    - 1534th Anti-Aircraft Missile Regiment (Angarsk Belaya air base region): S-300PM SAMs
  - 17th Guards Brigade of Army Aviation (Kamensk-Uralsky (air base)) The brigade was given the status of a Guards unit by an Ukaz of President Vladimir Putin in June-July 2022. Also units reported at Uprun.
  - 337th Independent Helicopter Regiment (Tolmachevo Airport, near Novosibirsk)

Under separate command, the command of Russian Long Range Aviation, there are long-range bomber units based at Engels and Belaya air bases within the geographical boundaries of the Central Military District.

== See also ==
- List of military airbases in Russia
