= Shindand SuperCobra incident =

1988 Soviet Afghan war incident with Iran

- Part of Soviet Afghan war
Date	26 September 1988
Location	Shindand, Herat Province, Afghanistan
Result	Soviet victory

Belligerents
Iran	Soviet Union

Commanders and leaders
(Iran) Hossein Hassani Sa'di	(Soviet Union) V. Astakhov (Soviet Union) B. Gavrilov

Units involved
Islamic Republic of Iran Army Ground Forces: Islamic Republic of Iran Army Aviation	Soviet Air Forces: 120th Guards Fighter Aviation Regiment

Casualties and losses
2 Bell AH-1 SuperCobras shot down At least 3 personnel killed	None

The Shindand SuperCobra incident involved the downing of two Iranian Bell AH-1 SuperCobras by Soviet forces near Shindand, Herat Province. It was the only air to air engagement between Soviet and Iranian forces in the Soviet-Afghan War that took place inside Afghanistan.

== Background ==
During the Soviet-Afghan War, Iran supported the Shia Mujahideen, namely the Persian speaking Shiite Hazaras. One of these groups was the Tehran Eight, a political union of Afghan Shi'a. They were supplied predominantly by the Islamic Revolutionary Guard Corps. This further strained the already tense relations between Soviet Union and Iran.

== Shootdown ==
On 26 September 1988 two Iranian Air force Bell AH-1 SuperCobras intruded into Afghan airspace southeast of Shindand, Herat Province. Two Soviet MiG-23ML of the 120th Guards Fighter Aviation Regiment piloted by B. Gavrilov and V. Astakhov were dispatched. The MiGs fired R-24 missiles at the SuperCobras, destroying both and killing at least 3 personnel on board.

== Aftermath ==
The incident was the last air-to-air kill by Soviets in the Soviet Afghan war. Soon after, the Soviets retreated from Afghanistan. The Tehran Eight also attacked Soviet forces more frequently after the incident.
