= 849th Fighter Aviation Regiment PVO =

- Active: 1942–1998
- Country: Soviet Union; Russia
- Branch: Soviet Air Forces; Soviet Air Defense Forces; Russian Air Defense Forces
- Type: Interceptor (from 1956)
- Garrison/HQ: Kupino (1962–1998)
- Engagements: Soviet invasion of Manchuria

The 849th Fighter Aviation Regiment PVO (Russian: 849-й истребительный авиационный полк ПВО (849 иап); Military Unit Number 35441) was an interceptor regiment of the Soviet Air Defense Forces during the Cold War.

== History ==
The regiment was formed as the 849th Light Bomber Aviation Regiment in April 1942 as part of the Air Forces of the Transbaikal Front. It was converted into the 849th Transport Aviation Regiment in December of that year. In accordance with directives dated April and May 1943, the regiment was reorganized as the 849th Assault Aviation Regiment (ShAP) during June and July 1943 at the Smolenka airfield, receiving the Ilyushin Il-2 ground attack aircraft. 2 July 1943 was celebrated as the unit anniversary. The regiment became part of the 316th Assault Aviation Division, based in Chita Oblast. The division was moved forward to Mongolia for the Soviet invasion of Manchuria, with the regiment based at Point 418 from 18 June. During the invasion, the regiment supported the actions of the Transbaikal Front ground troops against the Japanese, moving forward to Vanemyao in August, and returning to Domna, Chita Oblast in October after the Japanese surrender.

The regiment was re-equipped with the upgraded Ilyushin Il-10 ground attack aircraft during 1946 and 1947, and would operate them until 1956. It relocated to Bezrechnaya in 1946 and to Step in 1948. The 849th ShAP was transferred to the 253rd Assault Aviation Division in July 1947. The 253rd ShAD was renumbered as the 186th in January 1949. It was sent to China in 1950 to train People's Liberation Army Air Force pilots on the Il-10, being based in Xuzhou. Returning from China with the division in 1951, the regiment was based at Shonguy. The division was converted into the 186th Fighter Aviation Division PVO in mid-1956 and under this reorganization the regiment became the 849th Fighter Aviation Regiment PVO in June 1956, being relocated to Leninsk-Kuznetsky, receiving the MiG-15bis and the MiG-17. From 1958, the regiment, which began to operate the MiG-19, was located at Tolmachevo. From there in 1959, the pilots of the 849th IAP flew new Sukhoi Su-9 interceptors including airframes manufactured at the nearby Novosibirsk Aircraft Plant.

Under the 1960 PVO reorganization, the 186th IAD PVO was reorganized as the 20th Air Defense Division incorporating missile units, with the 849th IAP continuing as part of the division. Both became part of the 14th Independent Air Defence Army. In early 1960, two squadrons of the regiment were converted to the Su-9, and the 3rd squadron continued to operate the MiG-17PF until mid-1974. The joint basing of military aircraft at the civil Tolmachevo airport was discontinued by requirements of the Minister of Civil Aviation and the regiment was accordingly relocated to the training airfield of Kupino in 1962. The runway of the latter had to be lengthened to accommodate jets and a major reconstruction was carried out in 1977 and 1978. The regiment continued to fly Su-9s until being re-equipped with the MiG-23ML in August and September 1980. The 849th IAP went on alert duty with the new fighters on 1 October, now with the 38th Air Defense Corps reorganized from the 20th Air Defense Division earlier that year. Its aircraft were later upgraded to the MiG-23MLD standard.

After the dissolution of the Soviet Union, the 849th IAP became part of the Russian Air Defense Forces. The regiment received its last group of pilots in 1996 and was disbanded in mid-1998 due to military reductions forced by budget cuts.
