= Akhlystino =

Akhlystino Ахлыстино
- Selo
- Location within Bashkortostan Location within Russia
- Coordinates: 55°07′N 56°31′E
- Country: Russia
- Region: Bashkortostan
- District: Blagoveshchensky District

Population (2010)
  - Total: 344
- Time zone: UTC+5:00
- Postal code: 453437

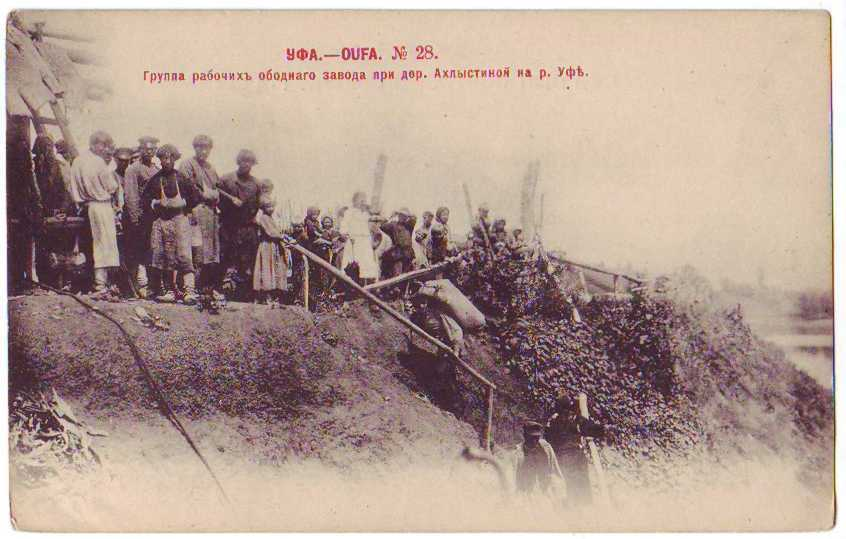
A postcard of Ufa from the early 20th century.

Akhlystino (Russian: Ахлыстино) is a rural locality (a selo) in Staronadezhdinsky Selsoviet, Blagoveshchensky District, Bashkortostan, Russia. The population was 344 as of 2010. There are 4 streets.

== Geography ==
Akhlystino is located 51 km northeast of Blagoveshchensk (the district's administrative centre) by road. Vladimirovka is the nearest rural locality.
