= Mikhail Babichev =

Belarusian professional footballer

Personal information
- Full name: Mikhail Anatolyevich Babichev
- Date of birth: 2 February 1995 (age 31)
- Place of birth: Postavy, Vitebsk Oblast, Belarus
- Height: 1.87 m (6 ft 1 1/2 in)
- Position: Defensive midfielder

Youth career
- 2009–2012: PMC Postavy
- 2012–2014: Rubin Kazan

Senior career*
Years	Team	Apps	(Gls)
2013–2014	Rubin Kazan	0	(0)
2014–2015	Kras	0	(0)
2015	Orsha	8	(0)
2016–2017	Vitebsk	55	(3)
2018	Torpedo-BelAZ Zhodino	14	(0)
2019	Neman Grodno	14	(1)
2020	RFS	15	(0)
2021–2023	Nõmme Kalju	70	(1)

International career
2016	Belarus U21	5	(0)
2017	Belarus B	1	(0)
- * Club domestic league appearances and goals as of 26 November 2023

Mikhail Anatolyevich Babichev (Belarusian: Міхаіл Анатолевіч Бабічаў; Russian: Михаил Анатольевич Бабичев; born 2 February 1995) is a Belarusian professional footballer who last played for Nõmme Kalju.
