= Postavy (air base) =

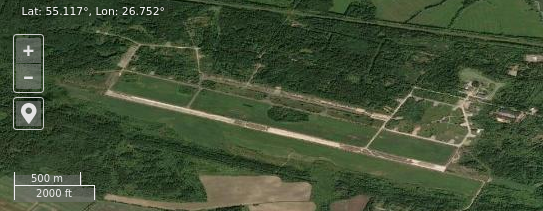
- Satellite imagery of the former Postavy air base
- IATA: none; ICAO: XMMP

Summary
- Location: Postavy
- Elevation AMSL: 472 ft / 144 m
- Coordinates: 55°7′0″N 26°45′7″E

Map
- Shown within Belarus

Runways
Direction	Length		Surface
Direction	ft	m	Surface
11/29	8,202	2,500	Concrete
- Tim Vasquez, Postavy

Postavy is a former air base in Belarus located 5 km west of Pastavy. It is a medium-sized air base. There are three loop areas with 15 revetments each, and central tarmac area.

It was home to 305th Bomber Aviation Regiment (305 BAP), 1st Guards Bomber Aviation Division, flying the Su-24. The regiment was activated in 1976, withdrawn to Krasnodar, Krasnodar Krai, and disbanded in 1993. From 1960 to 1988, the base was also home to the 940th Fighter-Bomber Aviation Regiment of the same aviation division.
