= 245th Fighter Aviation Division =

The 245th Fighter Aviation Division was a fighter aircraft unit of the Red Air Force and then the Soviet Air Forces, which transferred to the Soviet Air Defence Forces in 1951 and disbanded in 1958.

On formation it became part of the Air Forces of the Transbaikal Front, but quickly became part of the newly formed 12th Air Army.

On 5 August 1942, the 940th Fighter Aviation Regiment (IAP) was formed on 5 August 1942 at the 3rd Rail Siding airfield in Chita Oblast from the personnel of the 24th Reserve Aviation Regiment and 541st Short-Range Bomber Aviation Regiment. It was equipped with the then-obsolete Polikarpov I-16 fighter. On formation it joined the 245th Fighter Aviation Division.

In February 1949 it was redesignated the 153rd Fighter Aviation Division. The 153rd Fighter Aviation Division was transferred to the Soviet Air Defence Forces in 1951 and disbanded in 1958 in the Far East.
