= Uprun Air Base =

Airport in Chelyabinsk Oblast, Russia

Uprun Uprun/Troitsk Yuzhno-Uralskiy Uvelsky Uvelskiy
- Упрун/Троицк (Uvelskiy)
- Troitsk, Chelyabinsk Oblast in Russia
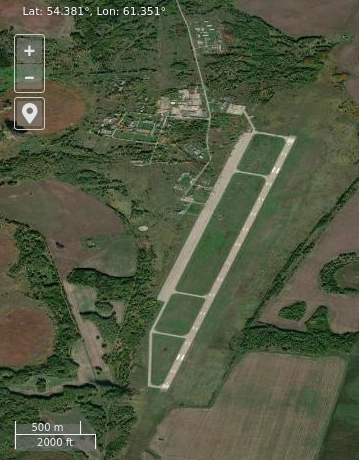
- Satellite imagery of Uprun air base

Site information
- Type: Air Base
- Owner: Ministry of Defence
- Operator: Russian Aerospace Forces
- Controlled by: 14th Air and Air Defence Forces Army

Location
- Shown within Chelyabinsk Oblast Uprun (Russia)
- Coordinates: 54°22′53″N 61°21′05″E

Site history
- In use: present

Airfield information
- Identifiers: ICAO: USCU
- Elevation: 238 metres (781 ft) AMSL
Runways
Direction	Length and surface
18/36	2,500 metres (8,202 ft) Concrete

Uprun is an airbase of the Russian Aerospace Forces located 20 miles north of Troitsk, Chelyabinsk Oblast, Russia.

The base is home to the Aviation Group, 17th Guards Brigade of Army Aviation of the 17th Guards Army Aviation Brigade.

The base has also been used by the 607th Training Aviation Regiment between 1982 and 1998.

== See also ==
- List of military airbases in Russia
