= Kamensk-Uralsky (air base) =

Airport in Sverdlovsk Oblast, Russia

Kamensk-Uralsky Kamensk-Uralskii/Traviany
- Kamensk-Uralsky, Sverdlovsk Oblast in Russia
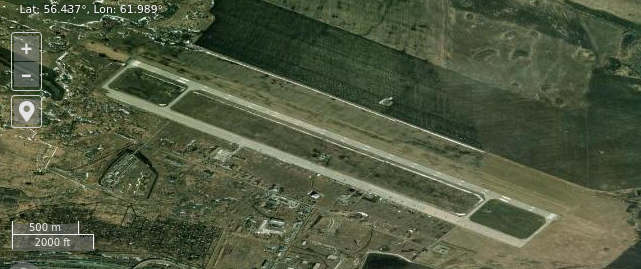
- Satellite imagery of Kamensk-Uralsky air base

Site information
- Type: Air Base
- Owner: Ministry of Defence
- Operator: Russian Aerospace Forces
- Controlled by: 14th Air and Air Defence Forces Army

Location
- Shown within Sverdlovsk Oblast Kamensk-Uralsky (Russia)
- Coordinates: 56°26′12″N 61°59′12″E

Site history
- In use: present

Airfield information
- Identifiers: ICAO: XSSU
- Elevation: 153 metres (502 ft) AMSL
Runways
Direction	Length and surface
11/29	Concrete

Kamensk-Uralsky, also known as Travyany, is a military air base near the village of Travyanskoye in the vicinity of the city of Kamensk-Uralsky, in the Sverdlovsk Oblast.

From 1948 to 1998(?) it was home to the 605th Training Aviation Regiment (UchSH Li-2(?); Il-28; Tu-124Sh; Tu-134Sh; Tu-16) of the Chelyabinsk Higher Military Aviation School of Navigators.

The base is home to the 17th Guards Army Aviation Brigade.

The call sign for the airfield is 'Welcome' (Russian: Радушный). In December 2018, the aviation brigade station at the base was reorganized and equipped with Mil Mi-24 attack helicopters, around which a new squadron was formed. Previously the base had been equipped with Mi-8 MTV-5 and Mi-8 MTV-5-1. The airport is notable as one of only two units in Russia that deal with the provision of space flights.

== See also ==
- List of military airbases in Russia
