= Andrey Arkhipaw =

Belarusian footballer (born 1995)

Personal information
- Date of birth: 6 February 1995 (age 31)
- Place of birth: Postavy, Vitebsk Oblast, Belarus
- Height: 1.76 m (5 ft 9 in)
- Position: Defender

Team information
- Current team: Kalwarianka Kalwaria
- Number: 21

Youth career
- –2012: PMC Postavy
- 2013: BATE Borisov

Senior career*
Years	Team	Apps	(Gls)
2014–2018	Luch Minsk	89	(1)
2019	Wiślanie Jaśkowice	15	(0)
2019	Bocheński KS	13	(0)
2020	Lida	18	(0)
2021	Podlasie Biała Podlaska	16	(0)
2023–2024	LKS Jawiszowice	43	(1)
2024–2025	Sparta Kazimierza Wielka	47	(0)
2026–	Kalwarianka Kalwaria	14	(0)
- * Club domestic league appearances and goals as of 09:50, 15 June 2026 (UTC)

Andrey Arkhipaw (Belarusian: Андрэй Архіпаў; Russian: Андрей Архипов; born 6 February 1995) is a Belarusian professional footballer who plays as a defender for Polish club Kalwarianka Kalwaria Zebrzydowska.

== Honours ==
Sparta Kazimierza Wielka

- IV liga Świętokrzyskie: 2024–25
