= 120th Guards Fighter Aviation Regiment =

Fighter aviation regiment of the Russian Aerospace Forces

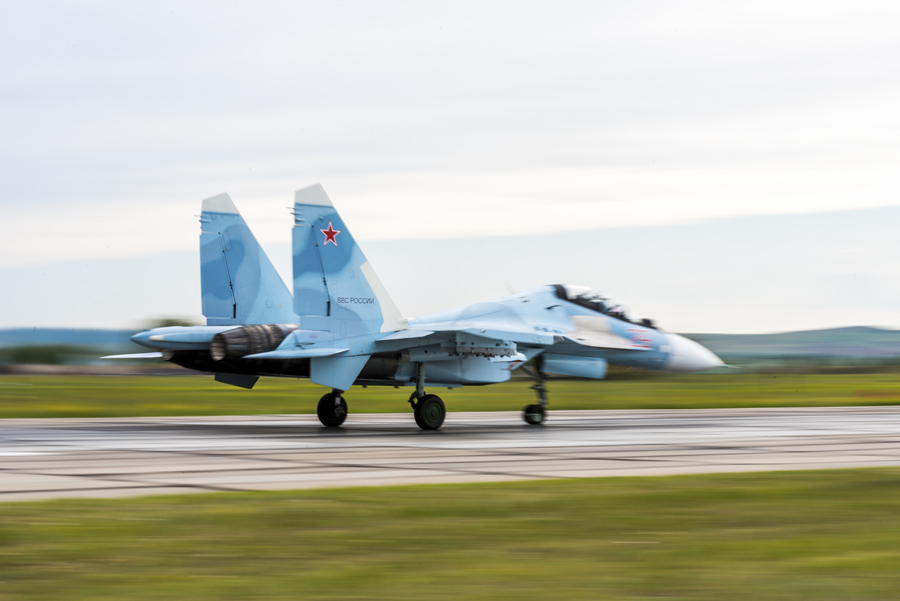
- A Sukhoi Su-30SM of the regiment, 2015
- Active: 1969–2009; 2015–present
- Country: Soviet Union; Russia
- Branch: Soviet Air Force; Russian Aerospace Forces
- Type: Fighter aviation regiment
- Part of: 11th Air and Air Defense Forces Army
- Garrison/HQ: Domna
- Engagements: Soviet–Afghan War; Syrian Civil War; Russo-Ukrainian War
- Decorations: Guards; Order of Suvorov 3rd class
- Honorifics: Brest

Insignia
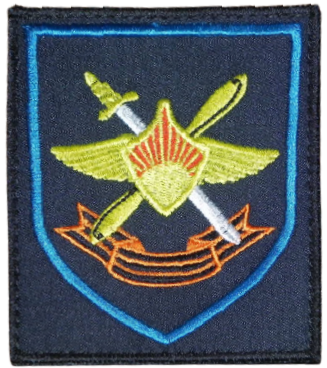
- Post-2018 regimental sleeve insignia

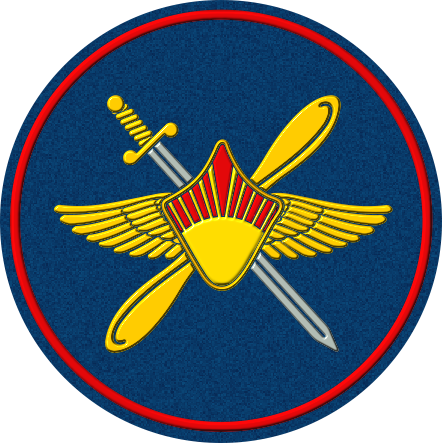
- Insignia of the 412th Aviation Base

Aircraft flown
- Fighter: Sukhoi Su-30SM

The 120th Separate Guards Brest Order of Suvorov 3rd Class Fighter Aviation Regiment (Russian: 120-й отдельный гвардейский истребительный авиационный полк; Military Unit Number 63559) is a fighter aviation regiment of the Russian Aerospace Forces. Based at Domna, the regiment is part of the 11th Air and Air Defense Forces Army and flies the Sukhoi Su-30SM.

Formed in Belarus beginning in 1969 as the 120th Fighter Aviation Regiment of the Soviet Air Force due to Sino-Soviet tensions, the regiment relocated to Domna near the border with China two years later and served there under the 23rd Air Army, operating the MiG-21 and then the MiG-23. Receiving high ratings in training exercises, the regiment was deployed to fight in the Soviet–Afghan War in 1988 and was the last Soviet aviation regiment to withdraw from Afghanistan when it departed in early 1989. Re-equipped with the MiG-29 during the 1990s, the regiment inherited the traditions of the disbanded 189th Guards Bomber Aviation Regiment in 1998, becoming the 120th Guards Fighter Aviation Regiment. After its disbandment in 2009 during the reform of the Russian Air Force, the aircraft and pilots of the regiment became part of the 320th and then the 412th Aviation Base. They began to convert to the Su-30SM in 2013 as further reorganizations resulted in the renaming of the base as the 120th Separate Composite Aviation Regiment. Several Su-30SM of the regiment were committed to the Russian military intervention in the Syrian civil war in 2015. Fully equipped with the Su-30SM, the regiment was renamed the 120th Separate Fighter Aviation Regiment in 2015 and received its current title in 2018. Its fighters have been deployed to participate in the 2022 invasion of Ukraine.

== Cold War ==
The 120th Fighter Aviation Regiment (IAP) began forming as part of the Soviet military buildup in response to tensions with China on 24 September 1969. It shares a number but no lineage with a regiment formed in 1940 which became the 12th Guards Fighter Aviation Regiment PVO.

Initially based at the Osovtsy airfield in Berezovsky district of Brest Oblast, Belarus, the regiment was part of the 26th Air Army of the Belorussian Military District. The 1st Aviation Squadron was formed from pilots of the 927th and 968th IAPs of the 26th Air Army, while the 2nd and 3rd Aviation Squadrons were formed from pilots transferred from other Air Force units and recent graduates of flying schools. Under the command of Lieutenant Colonel Solomon Zeltser, it was equipped with the MiG-21S. Following the completion of its formation in late 1970, the 120th IAP was relocated to Domna in the Transbaikal Military District in July 1971 in order to strengthen the Soviet air component on the border with China, its pilots making the flight in their aircraft. At Domna, the regiment joined the 23rd Air Army and began air defense operations late that year, receiving the upgraded MiG-21bis within the next several years. On 2 April 1972, the regiment received its battle flag.

Between February and March 1975, the regiment flew to Mary, Turkmenistan and spent a month there training. At the end of the year, the regiment was rated excellent and was awarded the right to be called a leader. On 7 February 1978, the regiment flew its first flights on the new Mikoyan-Gurevich MiG-23ML, its planes delivered directly from the aircraft factories. The aircraft of the regiment were upgraded to the MiG-23MLD standard by 1982. In 1979, the regiment was awarded the Ministry of Defense Pennant for placing first among leader regiments. From 25 February to 17 March 1982, the 120th IAP conducted a long-range flight to Mary, where all 40 of its aircraft participated in readiness tests involving evaluations of its flying skills, and firing missiles at La-17 target drones, in which it received a rating of excellent. In recognition of this achievement, the regiment received the Transferable Red Banner of the Central Committee of the Komsomol. During the same year, all flight personnel of the regiment were qualified as 1st class military pilots and sniper military pilots. In August 1986, the regiment was awarded a new battle flag.

=== Soviet–Afghan War ===
On 8 August 1988, the personnel of the 120th IAP forming two squadrons, maintenance personnel, and the regimental group under the command of regimental commander Colonel Valentin Burakov began deploying to Afghanistan during the Soviet–Afghan War. The regiment was one of the last air units sent to the country as Soviet forces had begun their withdrawal from it several months earlier. The 120th IAP arrived at Bagram on 19 August, and its structure differed from previous MiG-23 regiments sent to Afghanistan in that its squadrons were reinforced, with the 1st squadron numbering nineteen MiG-23MLD and two MiG-23UB, while the 2nd Squadron had fourteen MiG-23MLD and two MiG-23UB. The regiment was based at Bagram airfield except for a flight from the 2nd Squadron detached to Shindand airfield, located in a relatively calm region. The flight at Shindand escorted Su-17M4 and MiG-27D ground attack aircraft operating near Kandahar. Subsequently, the fighters were tasked with escorting Su-24, Tu-16, and Tu-22M3 bombers. To meet the bombers operating from airfields in Turkmenistan and Uzbekistan at the far end of their range, the MiG-23 of the regiment replaced their missiles with drop tanks on such missions. The increased number of aircraft placed additional burdens on the personnel of the regiment, and as a result four flights of pilots and a full complement of mechanics from the 32nd Guards IAP were flown in to reinforce it on 17 September, becoming the 3rd squadron of the regiment under the command of an officer from the 32nd. In Afghanistan, the MiG-23s of the 2nd squadron were painted on the nose with a distinctive shark mouth insignia, while those of the 1st squadron bore a soaring vulture, in a departure from traditional Soviet camouflage practices that did not include unit insignia.

The fighters of the 120th IAP flew their first independent sortie on 20 August 1988, the day after they arrived. The MiG-23s were tasked with airstrikes to hold back the mujahideen and prevent their advance along roads that were being used for the Soviet withdrawal. This mission was carried out by systematically area bombing selected grid squares, resulting in the expenditure of 129,000 bombs by the regiment in 1988. The MiG-23s of the 120th typically carried a pair of 250 kg or 500 kg bombs on these missions. 80 percent of the regimental sorties in 1988 were bombing missions, while only 15 percent were traditional fighter patrol or escort missions and four percent reconnaissance. The standby flight at Bagram provided air patrols over the airfield and was on alert for special missions, such as covering the airspace of Kabul during the visit of Soviet foreign minister Eduard Shevardnadze to Kabul in January 1989.

On several occasions its aircraft tangled with Pakistan Air Force aircraft entering Afghan airspace, including the downing of a Pakistani helicopter by Major V. Astakhov on 26 September. The regiment withdrew from Afghanistan and were relocated to Chirchiq airfield on 25 January 1989; it was the last Soviet aviation regiment to depart the country. On the day of the withdrawal, the final MiG-23s of the regiment left Bagram and the mechanics of the regiment began to leave the base. However, one of the MiG-23s developed engine failure and had to return to the base. Three pilots of the regiment volunteered to stay behind to fix the engine to prevent the aircraft from capture by the Mujahideen. Under fire, the pilots repaired the engine and did not leave the base until the aircraft had taken off. In five months of operations, the regiment flew 3,950 combat sorties in 2,350 flight hours, of which 529 sorties were providing escort to aircraft, 121 were air reconnaissance, and 3,300 were airstrikes. For their actions, six personnel of the 120th IAP were awarded the Order of the Red Banner, 30 the Order of the Red Star, 31 the Order "For Service to the Homeland in the Armed Forces of the USSR" 3rd class, 91 the Medal "For Battle Merit", and one received the Medal "For Distinction in Military Service".

== Russian service ==
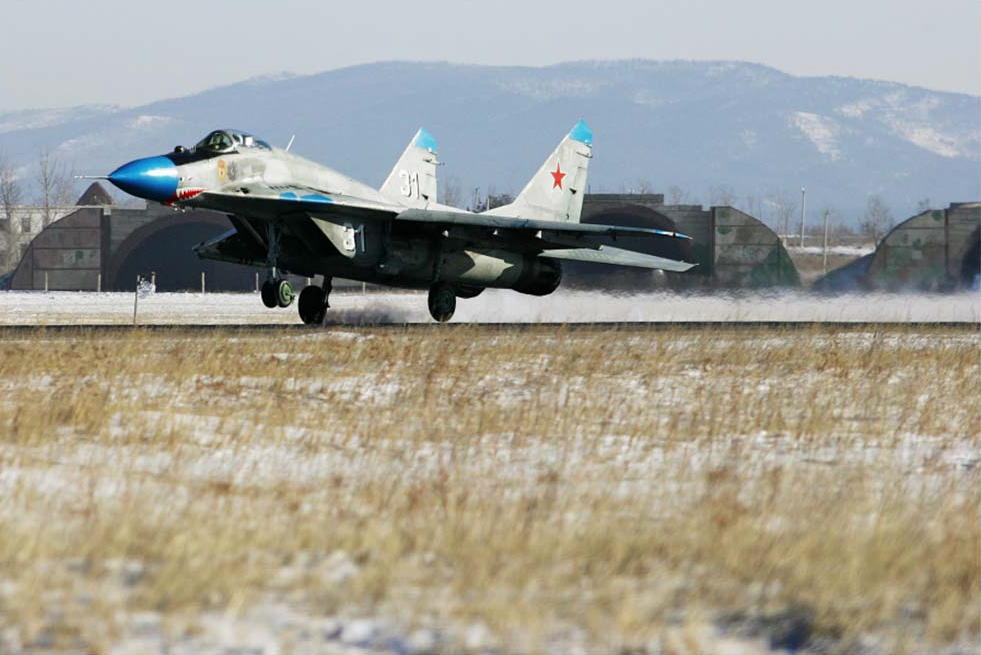
A MiG-29 of the aviation base at Domna, 2012, displaying the shark mouth insignia

After the dissolution of the Soviet Union at the end of 1991, the 120th IAP continued in service with the Russian Air Force. An October 1992 directive slated the 120th for conversion to the original production version of the Mikoyan MiG-29, handed over from the disbanded 176th IAP at Bagay-Baranovka. The transfer of aircraft did not begin until January 1993, and the regiment suffered from an initial shortage of ground equipment for the MiG-29s, abandoned by the 176th in its hasty withdrawal from newly independent Georgia. The MiG-29s were flown from Bagay-Baranvoka with several stops for refueling and by April the 120th IAP received all of the aircraft. Several newer MiG-29S from the 343rd Instructor IAP at Bagay-Baranovka were also transferred to the regiment. Its old MiG-23MLDs were sent to the Step air base for storage. The first flight of the regiment on the MiG-29 took place on 25 January, and the regiment continued the shark mouth tradition with the new aircraft. Over the next year, regiment continued familiarization and mastery of the MiG-29, with one disadvantage of the MiG-29 compared to the MiG-23 being the difficulty of operating the former in extremely cold winter conditions, addressed by warming up the engines hours before flights.

A fatal collision revealed training issues in the regiment: during a mock interception in early June, the canopy of the MiG-29 flown by deputy regimental commander for flight training Lieutenant Colonel Vyacheslav Rubel struck the tail section of the MiG-29 of squadron commander Major Vladimir Krivoshapko. Rubel was killed instantly, but Krivoshapko ejected safely. Both pilots were experienced and the accident occurred in clear weather; investigators faulted inadequate interception training for pilots, lack of communication between ground control and pilots, and the failure of the ground control officer to use radar altitude control which resulted in the approach being aborted too late to avoid the accident. Another fatal MiG-29 crash occurred during air show rehearsals over Chita Airport on 22 August 1995 when the pilot lost control and dived into the ground. Two more MiG-29s were lost on 4 March 1996 when they collided with each other while performing aerobatics, although their pilots escaped. The incident was blamed on the lack of rear- and side-view mirrors in early model MiG-29s. The last of the 120th's crashes of the 1990s was a fatal MiG-29 crash on 25 September 1998 caused by a worn-out engine catching fire during a training flight.

The 120th IAP became the 120th Guards Brest Order of Suvorov 3rd class Fighter Aviation Regiment on 28 April 1998 when it received the traditions of the nearby disbanded 189th Guards Bomber Aviation Regiment, a unit whose origins dated back to World War II. The regiment became part of the 14th Air and Air Defense Forces Army earlier that year when the Russian Air Force was reorganized. During the reform of the Russian Air Force on 1 December 2009, the regiment was reorganized into the fighter aviation squadron of the 320th Aviation Base. The 320th Aviation Base also included squadrons formed from the 266th Assault Aviation Regiment, 112th Separate Helicopter Regiment, and 36th Separate Composite Aviation Regiment stationed in the region. On 1 December 2010, the 412th Aviation Base of the 2nd category was formed at Domna and Cheryomushki as part of the 3rd Air and Air Defense Forces Command; it excluded the transport aircraft of the former 36th Separate Composite Aviation Regiment. The 412th included the squadron formed from the 120th GIAP, which was split into two MiG-29 squadrons at Domna. The personnel and equipment of the aviation group of the 6980th Aviation Base of the 2nd category also became part of the 412th Aviation Base, which included the assault and helicopter elements of the 320th. The base included the 1st and 2nd aviation squadrons with the Su-25, 3rd and 4th aviation squadrons with the MiG-29, the 5th helicopter squadron with the Mi-24, and the 6th helicopter squadron with the Mi-8. The helicopter squadrons remained at Cheryomushki, but the Su-25 squadrons transferred to Domna from Step.

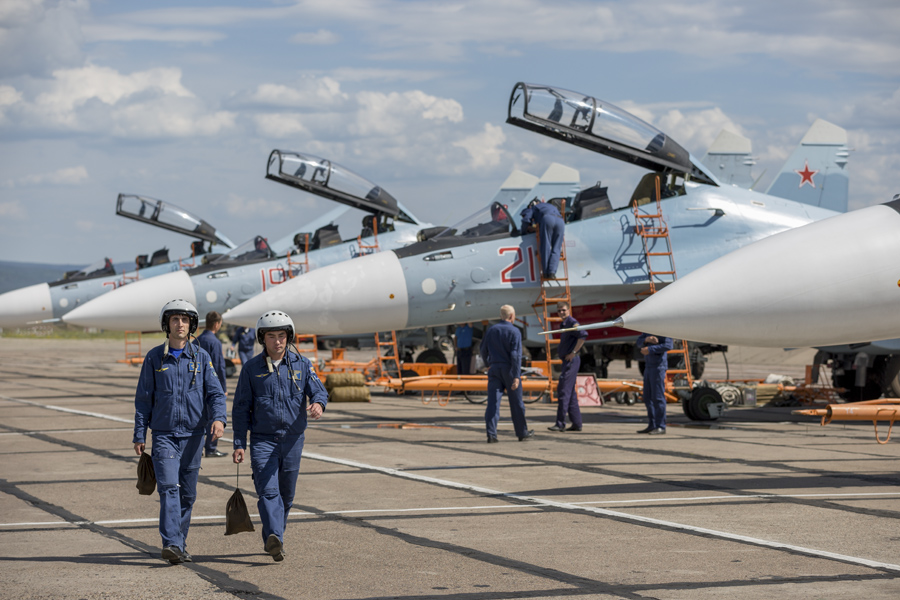
Personnel of the regiment during operations at Domna, 2015

In the span of less than two months between October and December 2008, two MiG-29s of the 120th IAP crashed, one fatally; both were attributed to mechanical failures in the aging MiG-29s of the regiment. The original MiG-29s of the regiment were replaced and cannibalized for spare parts for slightly newer MiG-29S airframes transferred east from the disbanded 28th Guards Fighter Aviation Regiment in 2009. The aircraft of the regiment had not been overhauled or modernized during their service. A September 2012 crash that killed squadron commander Lieutenant Colonel Albert Khadzhiyarov was attributed to mechanical failure, resulting in a temporary suspension of MiG-29 flights.

In May 2013 the personnel of the MiG-29 squadrons went to Lipetsk for retraining on the Sukhoi Su-30SM. In November 2013 the first ten Su-30SMs began arriving at Domna from the Irkutsk Aviation Plant. Ten more aircraft followed in 2014, and by the end of that year almost all of the pilots of the 120th completed training on the new airframe. Meanwhile, further organizational changes occurred as the Russian Air Force transitioned back to a regimental structure: the aviation base was reorganized into the 120th Separate Composite Aviation Regiment under the 3rd Air and Air Defense Forces Command on 1 December 2013. The regiment included four squadrons at Domna, two of which were equipped with the Sukhoi Su-25 and the other two with the MiG-29 and Su-30SM. Four Su-30SMs of the regiment were first relocated to Mozdok under the cover of exercises and on 18 September 2015 flew through Azerbaijani, Iranian, and Iraqi airspace to join other Russian aviation units at Khmeimim Air Base, where they participated in the Russian military intervention in the Syrian civil war. Although reports of their presence in Syria, first detected from photographs by Syrian social media users, were officially denied, two pilots of the regiment were decorated in March 2016 for their actions in Syria.

On 1 November 2015, the regiment was reorganized as the 120th Separate Fighter Aviation Regiment of the 11th Air and Air Defense Forces Army, with the Su-25s returning to the reformed 266th Assault Aviation Regiment. By 2017 the MiG-29s of the regiment had been retired and replaced by the Su-30SM, of which the regiment fielded 24 aircraft according to open-source data. On 8 November 2018, the Guards title of the regiment was restored by official decree, and it became the 120th Separate Guards Fighter Aviation Regiment.

For the 2022 Russian invasion of Ukraine, several Su-30SMs from the regiment were sent to Baranovichi air base in Belarus in late January, together with a mixed aviation group that also included Su-35s from the 22nd and 23rd IAPs of the 11th Air and Air Defense Forces Army. They participated in the invasion from the first day, and after the Russian withdrawal from Kyiv Oblast in April relocated to the Voronezh Baltimor air base in southwest Russia, from which they continued to fly missions in support of the invasion.

== Awards ==
The decorations and honorifics of the regiment were inherited in 1998 from those earned by the 189th Guards Bomber Aviation Regiment's predecessor 189th Guards Assault Aviation Regiment during World War II.

- The honorary title Brest was awarded to the 946th Assault Aviation Regiment, predecessor of the 189th Guards Assault Aviation Regiment on 10 August 1944 in recognition of its role in the capture of the city of Brest.
- The 946th Assault Aviation Regiment received Guards unit status on 27 October 1944 and was accordingly redesignated as the 189th Guards Assault Aviation Regiment.
- The Order of Suvorov, 3rd class, was awarded to the 189th Guards on 4 June 1945 in recognition of its contributions to the capture of the island of Rügen.
