= Vladimirovka, Liskinsky District, Voronezh Oblast =

Vladimirovka Владимировка
- Selo
- Location within Voronezh Oblast Location within Russia
- Coordinates: 50°49′N 39°52′E
- Country: Russia
- Region: Voronezh Oblast
- District: Liskinsky District
- Time zone: UTC+3:00

Vladimirovka (Russian: Владимировка) is a rural locality (a selo) in Petropavlovskoye Rural Settlement, Liskinsky District, Voronezh Oblast, Russia. The population was 460 as of 2010. There are 9 streets.

== Geography ==
Vladimirovka is located 48 km southeast of Liski (the district's administrative centre) by road. Petropavlovka is the nearest rural locality.
