= Vladimirovka, Sterlitamaksky District, Republic of Bashkortostan =

Vladimirovka Владимировка
- Village
- Location within Bashkortostan Location within Russia
- Coordinates: 53°48′N 55°31′E
- Country: Russia
- Region: Bashkortostan
- District: Sterlitamaksky District
- Time zone: UTC+5:00

Vladimirovka (Russian: Владимировка) is a rural locality (a village) in Pervomaysky Selsoviet, Sterlitamaksky District, Bashkortostan, Russia. The population was 40 as of 2010. There is 1 street.

== Geography ==
Vladimirovka is located 41 km northwest of Sterlitamak (the district's administrative centre) by road. Begenyash is the nearest rural locality.
