= Kupino, Novosibirsk Oblast =

Town in Novosibirsk Oblast, Russia

Kupino Купино
- Town
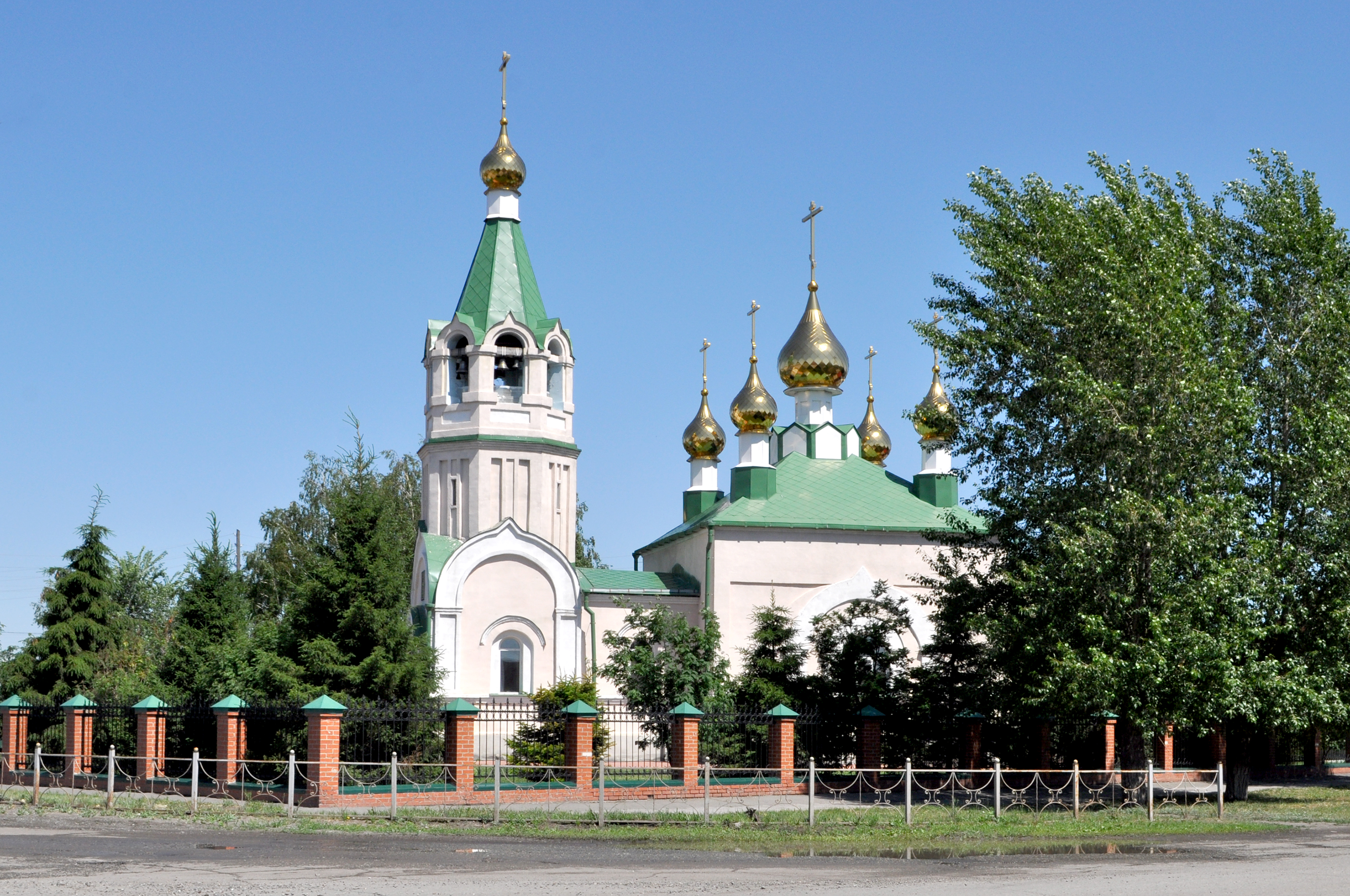
- Church in Kupino

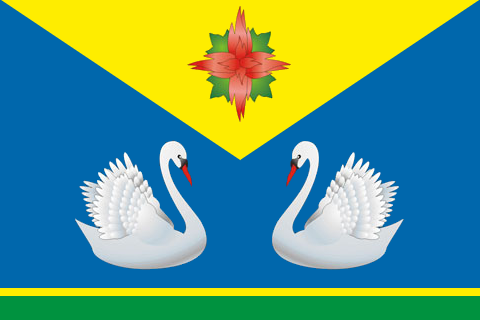
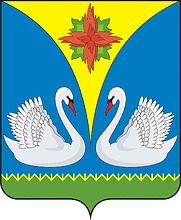
- Flag Coat of arms
- Interactive map of Kupino
- Location of Kupino Kupino (Novosibirsk Oblast)
- Coordinates: 54°22′N 77°18′E
- Country: Russia
- Federal subject: Novosibirsk Oblast
- Administrative district: Kupinsky District
- TownSelsoviet: Kupino
- Founded: 1886
- Town status since: 1944
- Elevation: 115 m (377 ft)

Population (2010 Census)
  - Total: 14,893
  - Estimate (2021): 15,065 (+1.2%)

Administrative status
  - Capital of: Kupinsky District, Town of Kupino

Municipal status
  - Municipal district: Kupinsky Municipal District
  - Urban settlement: Kupino Urban Settlement
  - Capital of: Kupinsky Municipal District, Kupino Urban Settlement
- Time zone: UTC+7 (MSK+4)
- Postal code: 632730–632735
- OKTMO ID: 50632101001

Kupino (Russian: Ку́пино) is a town and the administrative center of Kupinsky District in Novosibirsk Oblast, Russia, located 581 kilometers (361 mi) west of Novosibirsk, the administrative center of the oblast. Population: 14,893 (2010 census); 16,878 (2002 census); 19,518 (1989 Soviet census).

== History ==
It was founded in 1886 and was granted town status in 1944.

During the Cold War, Kupino air base was operated by the Soviet Air Force east of the town.

== Administrative and municipal status ==
Within the framework of administrative divisions, Kupino serves as the administrative center of Kupinsky District. As an administrative division, it is incorporated within Kupinsky District as the Town of Kupino. As a municipal division, the Town of Kupino is incorporated within Kupinsky Municipal District as Kupino Urban Settlement.
