= Kupino (air base) =

Airport in Novosibirsk Oblast, Russia

Kupino
- Kupino, Novosibirsk Oblast in Russia
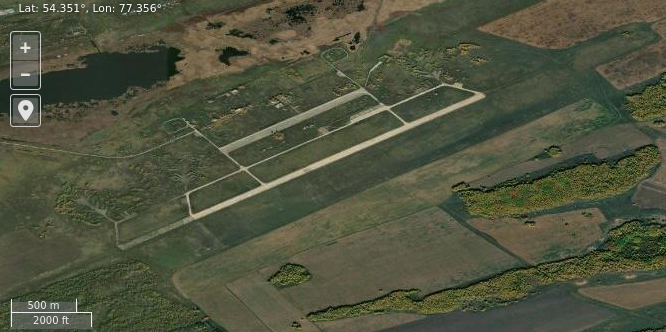
- Satellite imagery of the former Kupino airbase

Site information
- Type: Air Base
- Owner: Ministry of Defence
- Operator: Russian Air Force

Location
- Shown within Novosibirsk Oblast Kupino (Russia)
- Coordinates: 54°21′04″N 77°21′21″E

Site history
- Built: 1962
- In use: 1962 - 1998

Airfield information
- Identifiers: ICAO: XNNK
- Elevation: 112 metres (367 ft) AMSL
Runways
Direction	Length and surface
04/22	2,500 metres (8,202 ft) Concrete

Kupino is a former military air base in Novosibirsk Oblast, Russia. It is located 4 km southeast of the town of the same name. It largely served the interceptor air defense role for the Soviet Air Force.

Kupino was initially observed in the late 1950s by Western Lockheed U-2 overflights and was originally a training airfield. The 849th Fighter Aviation Regiment PVO, 14th Independent Air Defence Army, was based there from 1962. A 1966 satellite mission identified 30 Sukhoi Su-9 (NATO: Fishpot), confirming its role as an interceptor base, as well as first-generation interceptors that included 16 Mikoyan-Gurevich MiG-15 (NATO: Fagot) and 9 Yakovlev Yak-25 (NATO: Flashlight). An air warning radar facility was identified 1 mile northwest of the runway.

The regiment continued to operate the Su-9 into the 1970s. The regiment replaced it in 1980 with the MiG-23P (NATO: Flogger-G).

The base was closed after the end of the Cold War and the aviation regiment was disbanded in 1998.

== See also ==
- List of airports in Russia
- List of military airbases in Russia
