= Vladimirovka, Volokonovsky District, Belgorod Oblast =

Vladimirovka Владимировка
- Khutor
- Location within Belgorod Oblast Location within Russia
- Coordinates: 50°20′N 37°53′E
- Country: Russia
- Region: Belgorod Oblast
- District: Volokonovsky District
- Time zone: UTC+3:00

Vladimirovka (Russian: Владимировка) is a rural locality (a khutor) in Volokonovsky District, Belgorod Oblast, Russia. The population was 72 as of 2010. There are 2 streets.

== Geography ==
Vladimirovka is located 19 km southeast of Volokonovka (the district's administrative centre) by road. Ovchinnikovo is the nearest rural locality.
