= Alexander Tatarenko (general) =

Russian Lieutenant General of Aviation (born 1960)

- Александр Юрьевич Татаренко
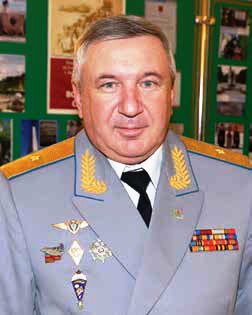
- Tatarenko in 2016
- Born: Alexander Yuryevich Tatarenko; 16 July 1960 (age 66); Izobilny, Stavropol Krai, Soviet Union
- Military career
- Allegiance: Soviet Union; Russia
- Branch: Soviet Air Forces; Russian Air Force
- Service years: 1975–2020
- Rank: Lieutenant general

Alexander Yuryevich Tatarenko (Russian: Александр Юрьевич Татаренко; born 16 July 1960) is a Russian lieutenant general who was the commander of the 14th Air and Air Defence Forces Army of the Central Military District (2016–2020), commander of the 11th Air and Air Defence Forces Army of the Eastern Military District (2013–2015). His rank was Lieutenant General (2015).

== Biography ==
In 1981 he graduated from the Stavropol Higher Military Aviation School of Pilots and Navigators PVO, in 1994 he graduated from the Zhukov Air and Space Defence Academy, in 2007 he graduated from the Military Academy of the General Staff of the Armed Forces of Russia.

He served in the Far East, the Urals, Siberia and the northern regions of Russia. He passed all positions from pilot to commander of the Air Force and Air Defense Association (until 2006 he was a chief of staff and first deputy commander of the 21st Air Force and Air Defense Corps), since August 2013 he was commander of the 3rd Air Force and Air Defense Command (from 2015 he served at the 11th Air and Air Defence Forces Army) Eastern Military District.

By decree of the President of the Russian Federation of January 12, 2016, he was appointed commander of the 14th Air and Air Defence Forces Army of the Central Military District.

Released from duty and dismissed from military service upon reaching the age limit in August 2020.

He was reported as killed by Ukrainian media during a missile strike on Belbek air base in Crimea on 30–31 January 2024, but this has not been independently confirmed.

== See also ==
- List of Russian generals killed during the Russian invasion of Ukraine
