= Vladimirovka, Astrakhan Oblast =

Vladimirovka Владимировка
- Selo
- Location within Astrakhan Oblast Location within Russia
- Coordinates: 47°10′N 47°01′E
- Country: Russia
- Region: Astrakhan Oblast
- District: Yenotayevsky District
- Time zone: UTC+4:00

Vladimirovka (Russian: Владимировка) is a rural locality (a selo) in Vladimirovsky Selsoviet of Yenotayevsky District, Astrakhan Oblast, Russia. The population was 910 as of 2010. There are 13 streets.

== Geography ==
Vladimirovka is located 12 km south of Yenotayevka (the district's administrative centre) by road. Vostok is the nearest rural locality.
