= Kupino, Belgorod Oblast =

Kupino Купино
- Selo
- Location within Belgorod Oblast Location within Russia
- Coordinates: 50°31′N 37°01′E
- Country: Russia
- Region: Belgorod Oblast
- District: Shebekinsky District
- Time zone: UTC+3:00

Kupino (Russian: Купино) is a rural locality (a selo) and the administrative center of Kupinskoye Rural Settlement, Shebekinsky District, Belgorod Oblast, Russia. The population was 1,296 as of 2010. There are 8 streets.

== Geography ==
Kupino is located 29 km northeast of Shebekino (the district's administrative centre) by road. Repnoye is the nearest rural locality.
