= Pastavy =

Town in Vitebsk Region, Belarus

Pastavy Паставы (Belarusian) Поставы (Russian)
- Town
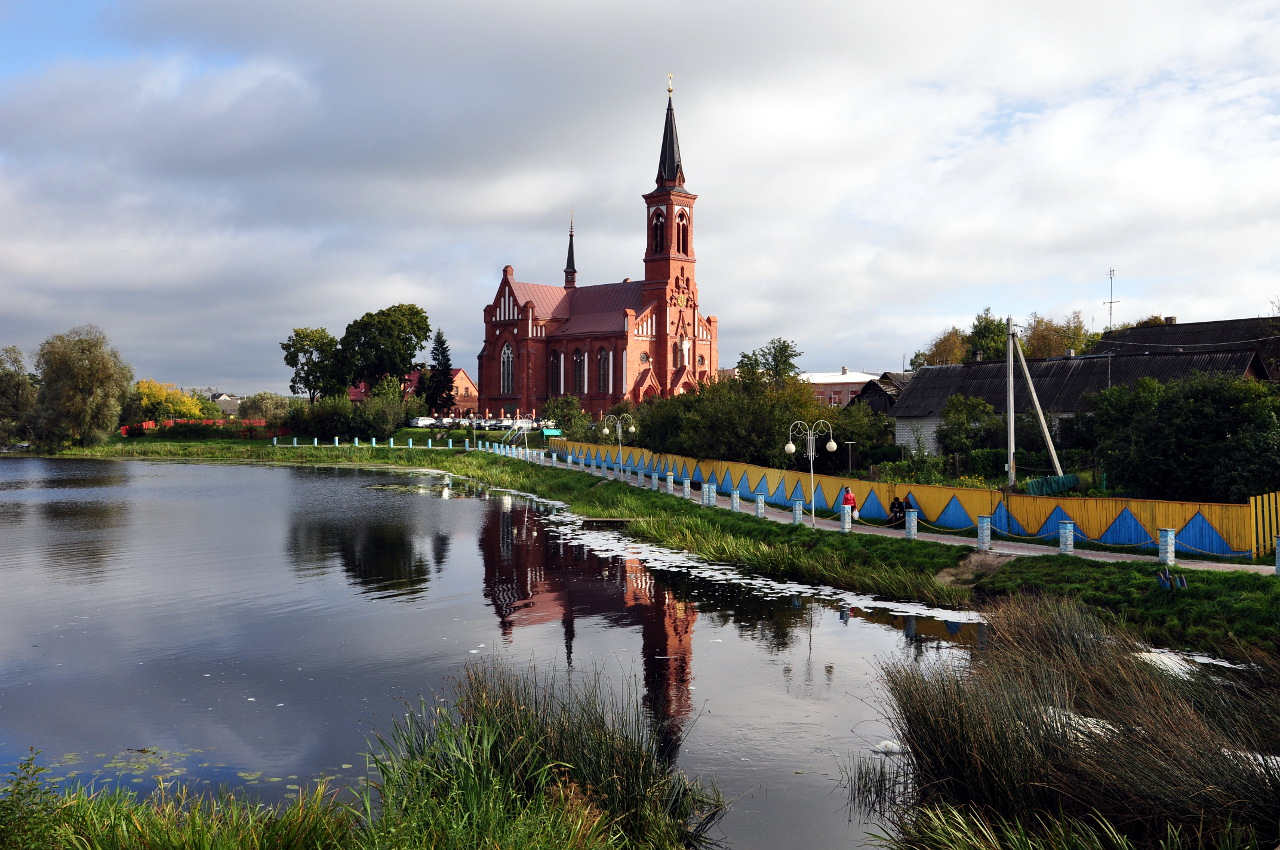

- Flag Coat of arms

- Location within Belarus
- Coordinates: 55°07′N 26°50′E
- Country: Belarus
- Region: Vitebsk Region
- District: Pastavy District
- First mentioned: 1409

Population (2025)
  - Total: 18,450
- Time zone: UTC+3 (MSK)
- Postal code: 211875
- Area code: +375 2155
- License plate: 2
- Website: http://postavy.vitebsk-region.gov.by/

Pastavy (Belarusian: Паставы; Russian: Поставы, romanized: Postavy; Polish: Postawy) is a town in Vitebsk Region, Belarus. It serves as the administrative center of Pastavy District. As of 2025, it has a population of 18,450.

== Location ==
Pastavy is located on the river Myadelka. Postavy Air Base is located 5 km west of Pastavy.

== Amenities ==
Pastavy has a station on the railway line between Vitebsk and Vilnius, Lithuania.

== History ==
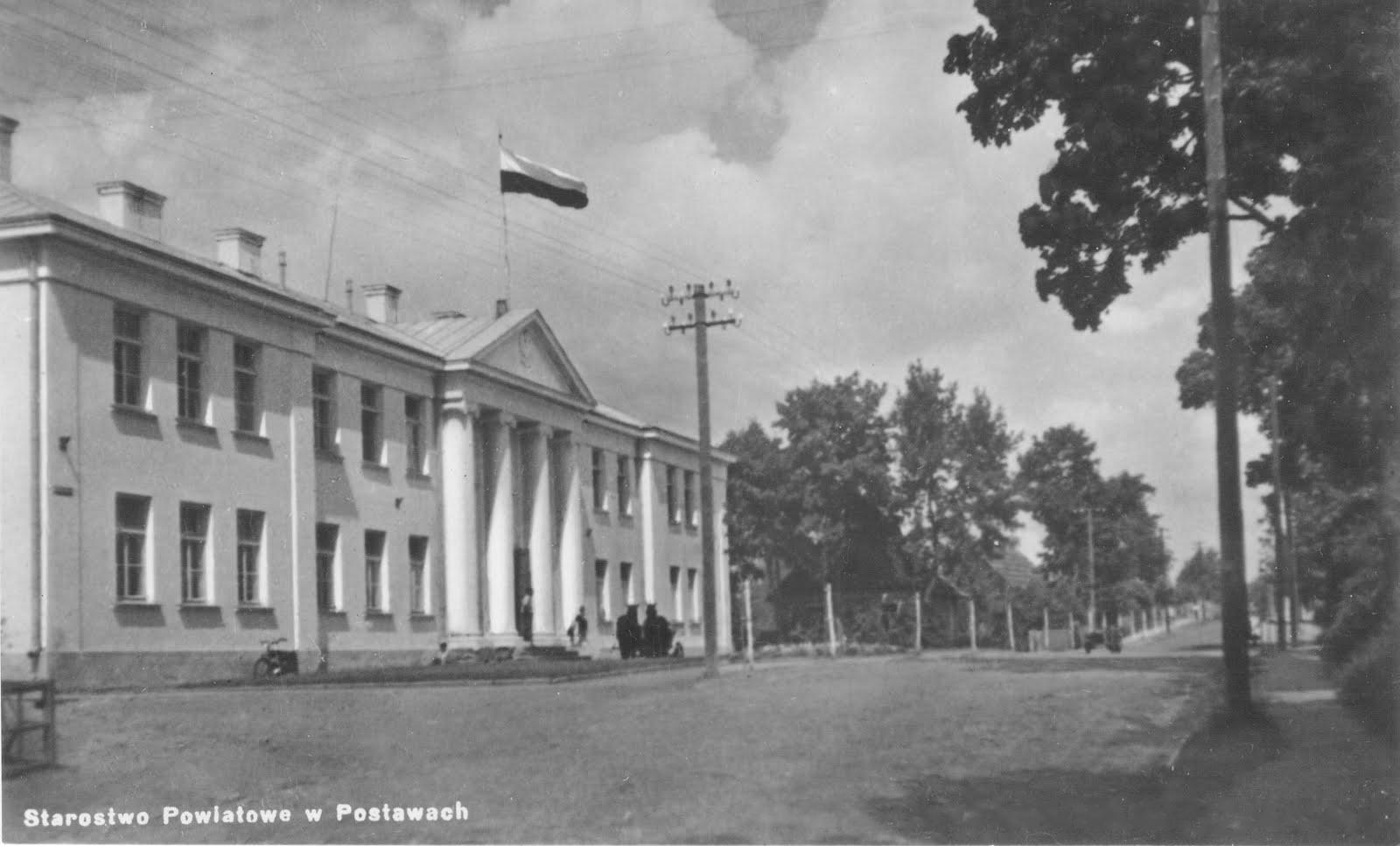
County Office in the interbellum

Pastavy has several historic buildings including 18th-century houses and 19th-century church. In 2009, Pastavy celebrated its 600th anniversary.

Within the Grand Duchy of Lithuania, Pastavy was part of Vilnius Voivodeship. In 1793, Pastavy was acquired by the Russian Empire as a result of the Second Partition of Poland.

From 1921 until 1939, Pastavy was part of the Second Polish Republic. In the 1921 census, 43.3% people declared Polish nationality, 34.8% declared Jewish nationality, and 21.7% declared Belarusian nationality.

In September 1939, the town was occupied by the Red Army and, on 14 November 1939, incorporated into the Byelorussian SSR. From 6 July 1941 until 5 July 1944, Pastavy was occupied by Nazi Germany and administered as a part of Generalbezirk Weißruthenien of Reichskommissariat Ostland.

== Notable people ==
- Andrey Arkhipaw (born 1995), footballer
- Mikhail Babichev (born 1995), footballer
- Aleksandr Brazevich (born 1973), football manager
- Siarhei Navumchyk (born 1961), journalist
- Koppel Pinson (1904-1961), historian
- Israel Pliner (1896-1938), Soviet officer
- Aleksander Rayevsky (1957-2008), test pilot
