= Vladimirovka, Sharansky District, Republic of Bashkortostan =

Vladimirovka Владимировка
- Village
- Location within Bashkortostan Location within Russia
- Coordinates: 54°58′N 54°02′E
- Country: Russia
- Region: Bashkortostan
- District: Sharansky District
- Time zone: UTC+5:00

Vladimirovka (Russian: Владимировка) is a rural locality (a village) in Pisarevsky Selsoviet, Sharansky District, Bashkortostan, Russia. The population was 37 as of 2010. There is 1 street.

== Geography ==
Vladimirovka is located 30 km north of Sharan (the district's administrative centre) by road. Sakty is the nearest rural locality.
