= Domna (air base) =

Airport in Zabaykalsky Krai, Russia

Domna
- Chita, Zabaykalsky Krai in Russia
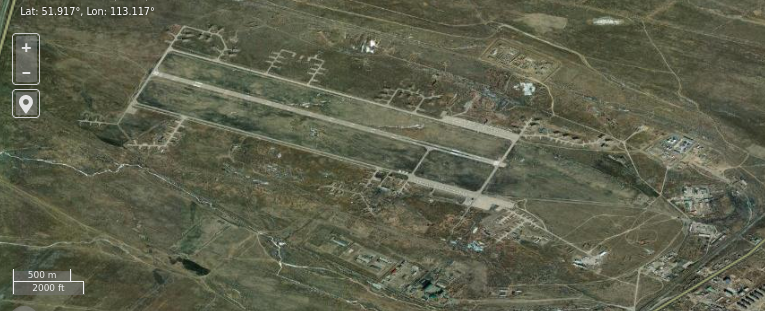
- Satellite imagery of Domna air base

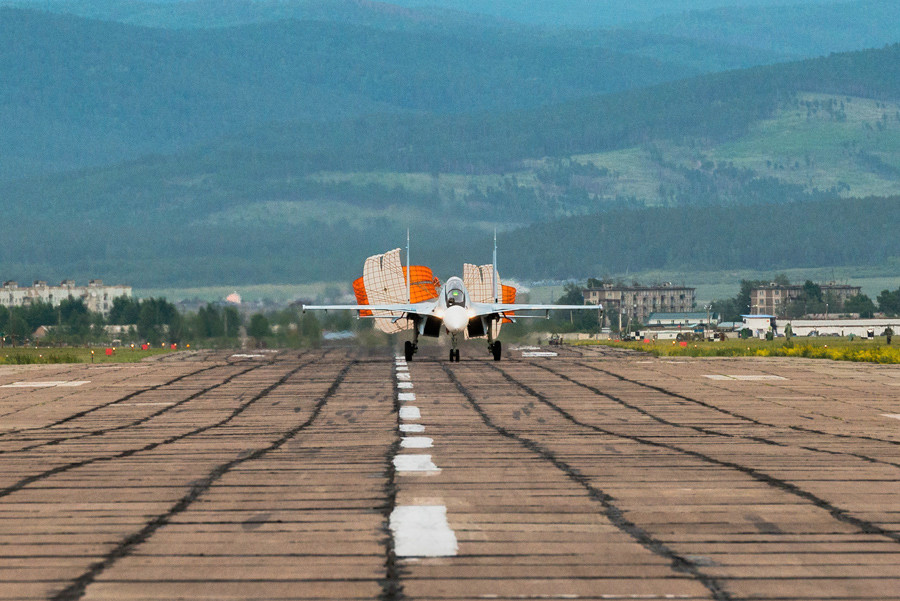
- Su-30SM at Domna

Site information
- Type: Air Base
- Owner: Ministry of Defence
- Operator: Russian Aerospace Forces
- Controlled by: 4th Air and Air Defence Forces Army

Location
- Shown within Zabaykalsky Krai Domna (Russia)
- Coordinates: 51°55′0″N 113°7′0″E

Site history
- In use: 1971 - present

Airfield information
- Identifiers: ICAO: UIAD
- Elevation: 695 metres (2,280 ft) AMSL
Runways
Direction	Length and surface
12/30	2,500 metres (8,202 ft) Concrete

Domna is a Russian Aerospace Forces airbase in Chita, Zabaykalsky Krai, Russia located 27 km southwest of Chita. It is a large, hardened facility with six areas of revetments probably holding 50 fighter aircraft. MiG-23 aircraft from Domna were deployed to Shindand, Afghanistan in the late 1980s.

The base is home to the 120th Composite Aviation Regiment, flying Mikoyan MiG-29s and Sukhoi Su-25s.

In 1937–1938, the personnel of the TB-3 heavy bomber aviation squadron, based in the Domna garrison, were the first in the country to undergo retraining and master the most modern aircraft of that time - SB high-speed bombers.

In 1939, the 38th High-Speed Bomber Aviation Regiment, based at the airfield, took part in the Battle of Khalkhin Gol. With the outbreak of war on June 22, 1941, the regiment, which was armed with 45 SB aircraft, began dismantling the aircraft and from June 22 to 26 was sent to the front in five echelons. Under regiment commander Mikhail Moiseevich Svinarev (1910 - 08/04/1942), the regiment was part of the 28th Aviation Division.

== Based units ==
Units stationed at Domna include:

- 733rd Bomber Aviation Regiment (733 BAP) flying Sukhoi Su-24 aircraft from 1975 to 1987. The regiment arrived at Domna in July 1966. Su-24M aircraft arrived in 1984. The regiment was disbanded in July 1987.
- 120th Fighter Aviation Regiment (120 IAP) The regiment was established in 1969 at Bereza-Osovitsy, Brest Oblast. In July 1971, possibly as part of the buildup against the People's Republic of China, it was moved to Domna. In 1978 it converted to the Mikoyan-Gurevich MiG-23, and in 1993 to the Mikoyan MiG-29. It was part of the 23rd Air Army from 1988 to 1998, the 14th Air and Air Defence Forces Army from 1998 to circa 2009, the 3rd AF & AD Command 2009–2015, and now the 11th Air and Air Defence Forces Army.
- 125 Gv ORAP (125th Guards Independent Reconnaissance Aviation Regiment) flying Su-17M3R in the late 1980s and as many as 26 Su-24MR aircraft around 1990.
- 114 BAP (114th Bomber Aviation Regiment) flying Sukhoi Su-24 aircraft; decommissioned around 1992.

The units at the base are now part of the 11th Air and Air Defence Forces Army of the Eastern Military District.

Four Su-30SM fighter aircraft from Domna were deployed to Khmeimim Air Base, Syria, on September 18, 2015.

Domna means "blast furnace" in Russian.

== See also ==
- List of military airbases in Russia
