= Vladimirovka, Altai Republic =

Vladimirovka Владимировка
- Selo
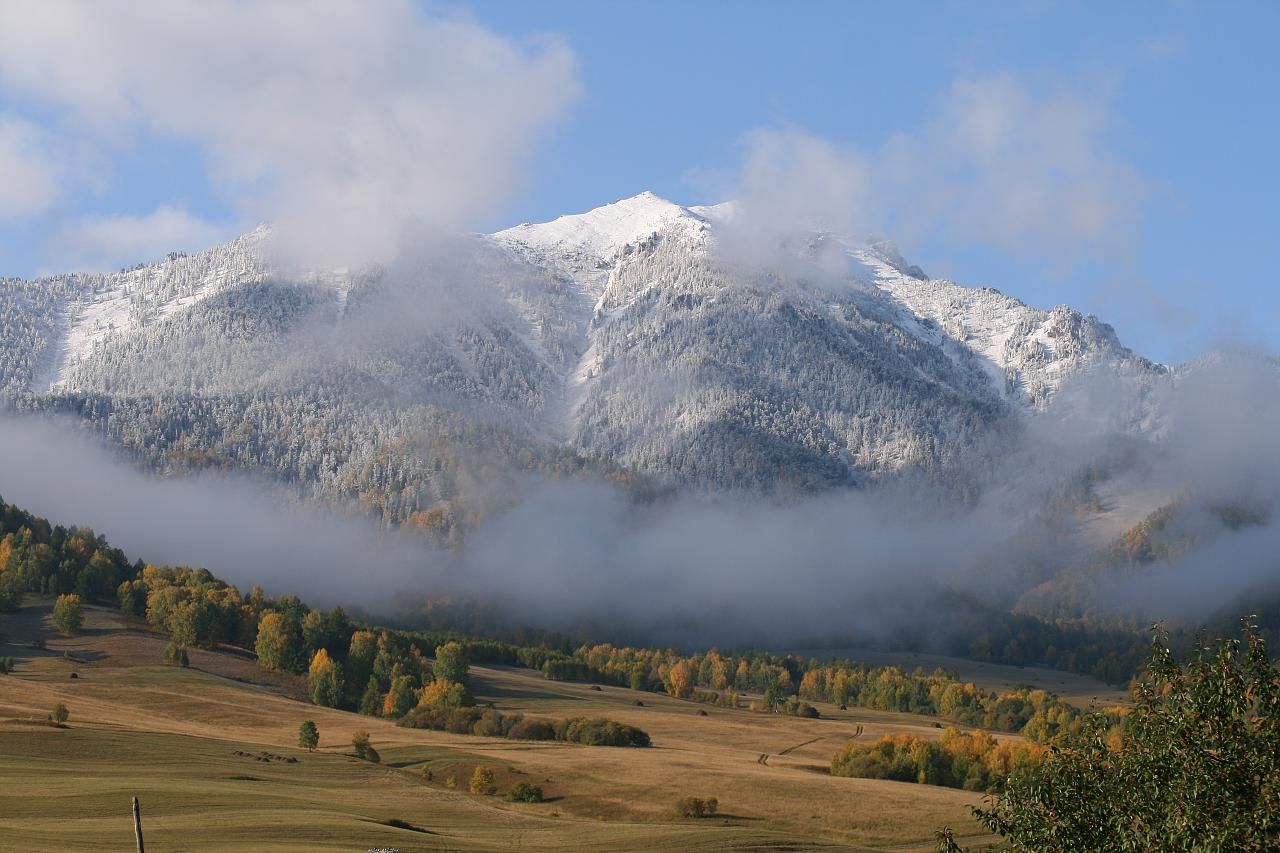
- Altai mountains

- Location within Altai Republic Location within Russia
- Coordinates: 51°02′N 84°12′E
- Country: Russia
- Region: Altai Republic
- District: Ust-Kansky District
- Time zone: UTC+7:00

Vladimirovka (Russian: Владимировка; Altay: Шуҥмары, Şuñmarı) is a rural locality (a selo) in Ust-Kansky District, the Altai Republic, Russia. The population was 203 as of 2016. There are 2 streets.

== Geography ==
Vladimirovka is located 44 km northwest of Ust-Kan (the district's administrative centre) by road. Ust-Kumir is the nearest rural locality.
