= Vladimirovka, Ostrogozhsky District, Voronezh Oblast =

Vladimirovka Владимировка
- Khutor
- Location within Voronezh Oblast Location within Russia
- Coordinates: 50°40′N 38°58′E
- Country: Russia
- Region: Voronezh Oblast
- District: Ostrogozhsky District
- Time zone: UTC+3:00

Vladimirovka (Russian: Владимировка) is a rural locality (a khutor) in Dalnepolubyanskoye Rural Settlement, Ostrogozhsky District, Voronezh Oblast, Russia. The population was 152 in 2010. There are four streets.

== Geography ==
Vladimirovka is located 36 kilometres (22 mi) southwest of Ostrogozhsk (the district's administrative centre) by road. Dalnyaya Polubyanka is the nearest rural locality.
