= Vladimirovka, Amur Oblast =

Vladimirovka Владимировка
- Selo
- Location within Amur Oblast Location within Russia
- Coordinates: 50°18′N 127°38′E
- Country: Russia
- Region: Amur Oblast
- District: Blagoveshchensky District
- Time zone: UTC+9:00

Vladimirovka (Russian: Владимировка) is a rural locality (a selo) in Ust-Ivanovsky Selsoviet of Blagoveshchensky District, Amur Oblast, Russia. The population was 1,031 as of 2018. There are 77 streets.

== Geography ==
Vladimirovka is located on the left bank of the Zeya River, 12 km east of Blagoveshchensk (the district's administrative centre) by road. Blagoveshchensk is the nearest rural locality.
