= 23rd Air Army =

Soviet and Russian Air Force formation

The 23rd Air Army was an Air army of the Soviet Air Forces and the Russian Air Forces, active from the 1960s to the 1990s. It traced its origins to the 12th Air Army, formed during World War II, and served in the Transbaikal region for the entirety of its existence.

== History ==
Originally the 12th Air Army had been activated by NKO decree of July 1942 on 15 August 1942, from the Air Forces of the Transbaikal Military District. Its initial units included the 30th and 247th Bomber Aviation Divisions, 245th and 246th Fighter Aviation Divisions, and the 248th Assault Aviation Division. From 1942 to 1945 it was part of the Transbaikal Front, and from 1945 to 1947 part of the Transbaikal-Amur Military District before becoming part of the Transbaikal Military District in 1949. In February 1949 the army was redesignated the 45th Air Army (decree of 10 January 1949). In July 1957 the army was redesignated the Air Forces of the Transbaikal Military District. In 1962 it was a very small force, only comprising an independent reconnaissance aviation regiment and an independent composite ('mixed') aviation squadron.

In late 1967 it was redesignated the 23rd Air Army. Three new aviation divisions were formed in the army between 1967 and 1972. In 1961 or 1969 the 189th Guards Fighter-Bomber Aviation Regiment arrived from Poland to Chindant-2 (likely the base also known as Borzya-2) in the Chita Oblast. In 1971 the 120th Fighter Aviation Regiment arrived from the Belorussian SSR (26th Air Army) at Domna (27 km from Chita) and became part of the army as an independent regiment. In 1980 the army was again redesignated the Air Forces of the Tranbaikal Military District.

In May 1988 VVS ZabVO was redesignated the 23rd Air Army.

The 313th Independent Reconnaissance Aviation Regiment joined 23rd Air Army in December 1993-January 1994, arriving from Georgia to Chindant-2 / Borzya-2. Already in place was the 30th Fighter-Bomber Aviation Division at Step, but the division was disbanded in 1990. Another reconnaissance aviation regiment in the area was the 101st at Borzya-2.

The army was disbanded by amalgamation with the 14th Independent Air Defence Army in 1998 to form the 14th Air and Air Defence Forces Army.
