= Vladimirovka, Blagoveshchensky District, Republic of Bashkortostan =

Vladimirovka Владимировка
- Village
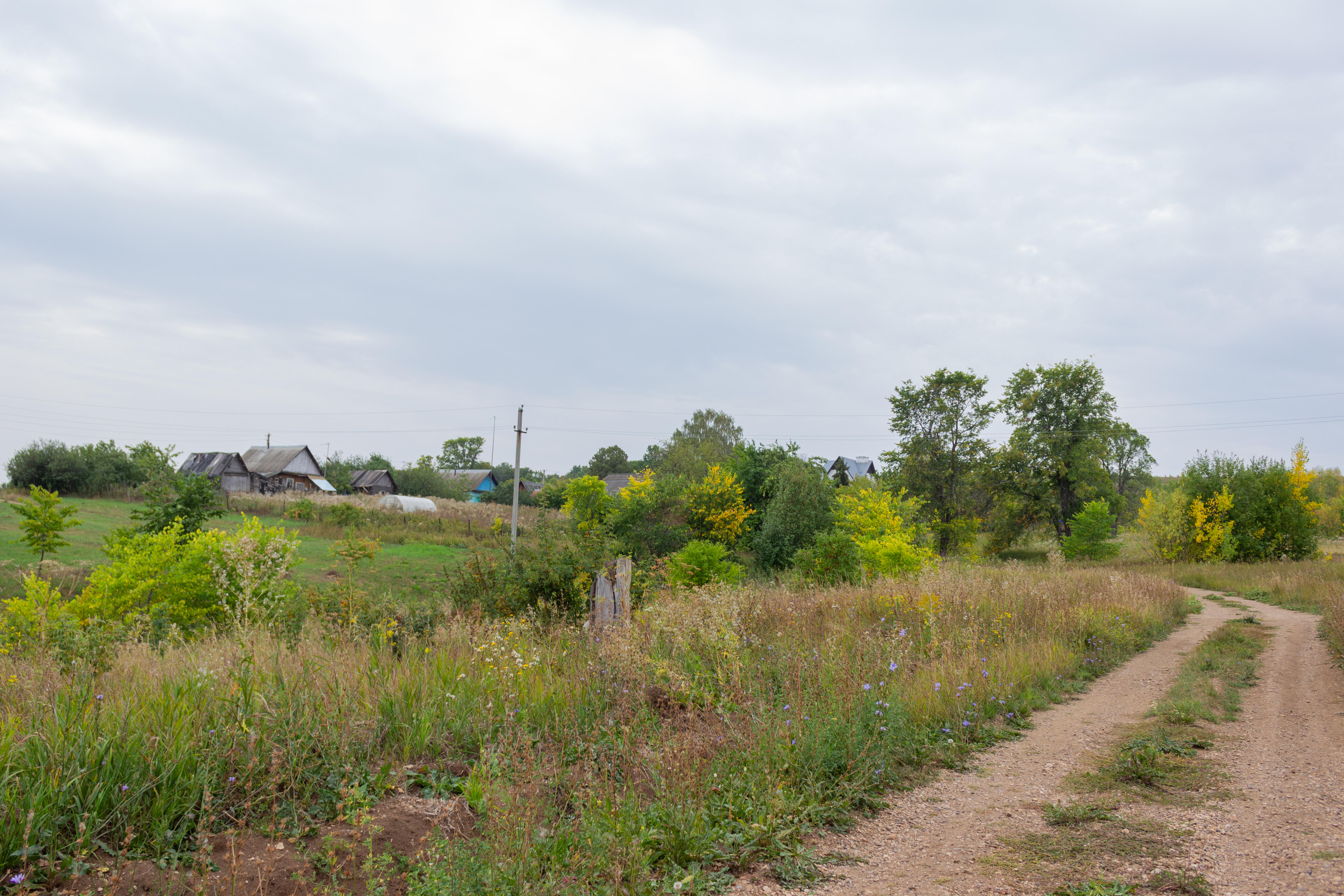
- Vladimirovka village

- Location within Bashkortostan Location within Russia
- Coordinates: 55°07′N 56°29′E
- Country: Russia
- Region: Bashkortostan
- District: Blagoveshchensky District
- Time zone: UTC+5:00

Vladimirovka (Russian: Владимировка) is a rural locality (a village) in Staronadezhdinsky Selsoviet, Blagoveshchensky District, Bashkortostan, Russia. The population was 24 as of 2010. There are 2 streets.

== Geography ==
Vladimirovka is located 52 km northeast of Blagoveshchensk (the district's administrative centre) by road. Akhlystino is the nearest rural locality.
