= Step (air base) =

Airport in Zabaykalsky Krai, Russia

Step Olovyannaya
- Chita, Zabaykalsky Krai in Russia
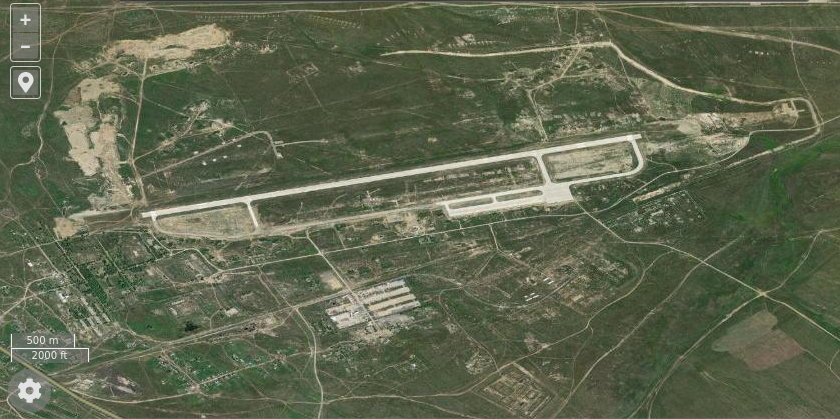
- Satellite imagery of Step air base

Site information
- Type: Air Base
- Owner: Ministry of Defence
- Operator: Russian Aerospace Forces
- Controlled by: 11th Air and Air Defence Forces Army

Location
- Shown within Zabaykalsky Krai Step (Russia)
- Coordinates: 51°1′0″N 115°26′0″E

Site history
- Built: 1948
- In use: 1948 - present

Airfield information
- Identifiers: ICAO: XIAS
Runways
Direction	Length and surface
09/27	2,500 metres (8,202 ft) Concrete

Step (also Olovyannaya) is an air base in Chita, Russia located 14 km northwest of Yasnogorsk. It is a large air base with two revetment areas and numerous military fortifications. It is near an SS-11 missile field that was dismantled in the mid-1990s.

The 849th Assault Aviation Regiment, part of the 253rd Assault Aviation Division, was stationed at Step up until 1956.

Units stationed at Step/Olovyannaya include:

- 6th Aviation Regiment of Fighter-Bombers (6 APIB) flying Sukhoi Su-17 in the late 1980s; under 23rd Air Army, Transbaikal Military District.
- 58th Fighter-Bomber Aviation Regiment (58 APIB) flying Su-17M3 and L-29 aircraft in the late 1980s, and receiving MiG-27 in the early 1990s. It was under 23rd Air Army (Trans-Baikal).
- 266th Independent Shturmovik Aviation Regiment (266th Assault Aviation Regiment, 266 OShAP) flying Sukhoi Su-25 aircraft. Disbanded circa 2009.

The base appears to have been closed after a boiler room fire in December 2009. Thereafter, the base was reopened and the 266th Independent Shturmovik Aviation Regiment was reformed with at least two squadrons of Sukhoi-25s in 2019. The regiment by this time had been shifted into the Eastern Military District's 11th Air and Air Defence Forces Army.

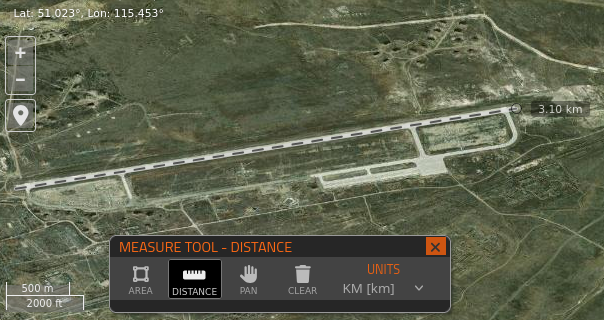
NASA's FIRMS shows runway 09/27 to be 3.10 km

As of 2024 satellite imagery shows runway 09/27 to be 3.10 km.

== See also ==
- List of military airbases in Russia
