= List of squadrons and detachments of the Russian Air Force 2007 =

This is a list of reported active squadrons and detachments of the Russian Air Force in 2007.

Squadron/Detachment	Type	Headquarters	Locations	Formation	Equipment
5th Independent Long-range Reconnaissance Aviation Detachment	ODRAO	Kubinka, Moscow Oblast	55°36′29″N 36°37′57″E	NA	Antonov An-30
76th Independent Military Transport Aviation Squadron	OVTAE	Migalovo, Tver Oblast	56°49′39″N 35°45′33″E	12th VTAD	Antonov An-22
78th Independent Military Transport Aviation Squadron	OVTAE	Klin-5, Moscow Oblast	56°21′56″N 36°43′19″E	61st Air Army	Antonov An-26/Antonov An-12/Tupolev Tu-134
85th Independent Helicopter Squadron	OVE	Alakurtti, Murmansk Oblast	66°58′13″N 30°21′44″E	6th Air Army	Mil Mi-8/Mil Mi-24
92nd Research Instructor Helicopter Squadron	IIVE	Sokol, Magadan Oblast	59°54′52″N 150°41′52″E	NA	Mi-8/Mi-24
118th Independent Helicopter Squadron	OVE	Chebenki, Orenburg Oblast	51°58′39″N 55°32′32″E	NA	Mil Mi-6/Mil Mi-8
128th Independent Composite Aviation Squadron	OSAE	Koltsovo, Sverdlovsk Oblast	56°44′51″N 60°49′31″E	5th Air Army	An-26
137th Independent Composite Aviation Squadron	OSAE	Tolmachevo, Novosibirsk Oblast	55°00′17″N 84°41′19″E	14th Air Army	An-26
147th Independent Helicopter Squadron of Electronic Warfare	OVE REB	Pushkin, Leningrad Oblast	59°41′12″N 30°19′45″E	6th Air Army	Mi-8PPA
181st Independent Aviation Squadron	OAE	Irkutsk, Irkutsk Oblast	54°54′44″N 103°34′10″E	37th Air Army	Antonov An-12/Antonov An-30
223rd Aviation Detachment	LO	Chkalovsky, Moscow Oblast	55°52′52″N 38°02′09″E	NA	An-12/Ilyushin Il-18/Ilyushin Il-62/Il-76/Tu-134/Tupolev Tu-154
224th Air Detachment of Military Transport Aviation	LO VTA	Migalovo, Tver Oblast	56°49′39″N 35°45′33″E	61st Air Army	Antonov An-124 Ruslan/Ilyushin Il-76MD
237th Independent Helicopter Squadron	OVE	Bobrovka, Samara Oblast	53°08′42″N 50°42′51″E	5th Air Army	Mi-8/Mi-24
320th Independent Aviation Squadron of Search & Rescue	OTAE PSS	Troitsk, Chelyabinsk Oblast	54°06′38″N 61°32′26″E	5th Air Army	Mi-8
386th Independent Composite Aviation Squadron	OSAE	Nalchik, Kabardino-Balkaria	43°30′42″N 43°38′34″E	NA	An-12

== Index of abbreviations ==
- IIVE - Research Instructor Helicopter Squadron (Issledovatelskiy Instruktorskiy Vertoliotniy Eskadrilya)
- LO - Aviation Detachment (Lyotnyi Otriad)
- LO VTA - Aviation Detachment of Military Transport Aviation (Lyotnyi Otriad Voyenno-Transportnoy Aviatsii )
- ODRAO - Independent Long-range Reconnaissance Aviation Detachment (Otdelnyi Dalniy Razvedyvatelnyi Aviatsionnyi Otriad)
- OSAE - Independent Composite Aviation Squadron (Otdelnaya Smeshannaya Aviatsionnaya Eskadrilya)
- OTAE PSS - Independent Transport Aviation Squadron (Otdelnaya Transportnaya Aviatsionnaya Eskadrilya Poiskovo-Spasatelnoy Sluzhby)
- OVE - Independent Helicopter Squadron (Otdelnaya Vertoliotnaya Eskadrilya)
- OVE REB - Independent Helicopter Squadron of Electronic Warfare(Otdelnaya Vertoliotnaya Eskadrilya Radio-Elektronnoy Bor'by)
- OVTAE - Independent Military Transport Aviation Squadron (Otdelnaya Voyenno-Transportnaya Aviatsionnaya Eskadrilya)
- VTAD - Military Transport Aviation Division (Voyenno-Transportnaya Aviatsionnaya Diviziya)

== Sources ==
- Piotr Butowski. Force report:Russian Air Force, Air Forces Monthly, July & August 2007 issues.
