= Orenburg (air base) =

Orenburg Orenburg-2 Оренбург-2
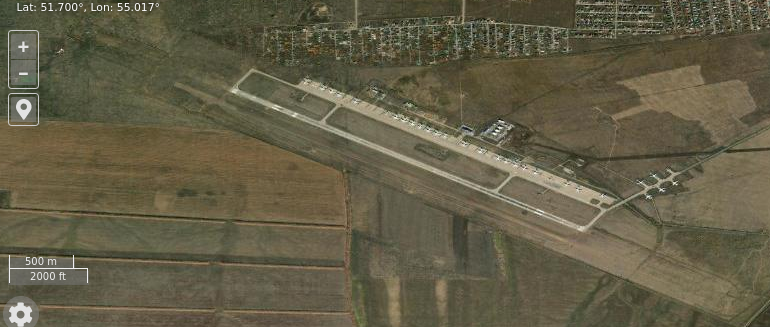
- Satellite imagery of Orenburg air base
- IATA: none; ICAO: XWON

Summary
- Airport type: Military
- Operator: Russian Aerospace Forces - Military Transport Aviation
- Location: Orenburg, Orenburg Oblast
- Elevation AMSL: 112 m / 367 ft
- Coordinates: 51°42′0″N 55°1′0″E
- Interactive map of Orenburg; Orenburg-2; Оренбург-2

Runways
Direction	Length		Surface
Direction	m	ft	Surface
11/29	2,500	8,202	Concrete

Orenburg (also given as Orenburg Southwest) is a Military Transport Aviation base in Russia located 9 km southwest of Orenburg. It has a large tarmac and revetments for 35 large transports. It is sometimes erroneously referred to as Chalovskiy Airport. .

The base is home to the 117th Military Transport Aviation Regiment as part of the 18th Guards Military Transport Aviation Division.

The 128th Guards Military Transport Air Regiment (128 Gv TAP) flying Ilyushin Il-76M arrived from Panevėžys Air Base in newly independent Lithuania in 1992. It was subordinated to 18th Guards Military Transport Aviation Division. The regiment was disbanded in 1998.

Until 1996, the 336th Aircraft Repair Plant of the Ministry of Defense - military unit 13814 (which repaired An-26 aircraft, previously Il-28) operated at the airfield. In 1998, a number of its facilities located in Orenburg, Aviagorodok-2 (Pristantsionny village) were transferred to municipal ownership.

117th Berlin Order of Kutuzov III degree Independent Aviation Regiment for Electronic Warfare flying Antonov An-12PPS aircraft arrived from Siauliai in Lithuania in 1994. It was then redesignated a Military Transport Aviation Regiment (117 OVTAP) and starting flying the Ilyushin Il-76. It was part of the 12th Military Transport Aviation Division. In 2009-2010 the regiment was redesignated the 6956th Aviation Base but was reverted in 2014.

Also based at the airport is the 102nd Separate Mixed Aviation Squadron (102nd OSAE), part of the 31st Missile Army, Strategic Rocket Forces. It is equipped with Antonov An-26 aircraft and Mil Mi-8 helicopters. Previously the base also hosted units of the now disbanded Orenburg Higher Military Aviation School of Pilots.

Chebenki airbase is also located in the vicinity of Orenburg.

== See also ==
- List of military airbases in Russia
