= Soviet Air Forces =

Aerial warfare branch of the Soviet Union's armed forces

- Военно-Воздушные Силы СССР; Voenno-Vozdushnye Sily SSSR
- Flag of the Soviet Air Force
- Founded: 24 May 1918
- Disbanded: 14 February 1992
- Country: Russian SFSR (1918–1922); Soviet Union (1922–1991); CIS (1991–1992)
- Size: 10,101 aircraft (1973); 7,859 aircraft (1990)
- Part of: Soviet Armed Forces
- Main staff: Moscow
- March: "March of the Pilots"

Commanders
- Commander-in-Chief of the Soviet Air Forces: See list

Insignia
- Roundel and fin flash

Aircraft flown
- Attack: Su-25
- Bomber: Il-28, Su-24, Tu-16, Tu-22, Tu-22M, Tu-95, Tu-160
- Electronic warfare: A-50, Tu-126
- Fighter: La-15, MiG-9, MiG-15, MiG-17, MiG-19, MiG-21, MiG-23, MiG-27, MiG-29, Su-7, Su-17, Su-27, Yak-15, Yak-17
- Helicopter: Mi-2, Mi-8, Mi-14, Mi-17
- Attack helicopter: Mi-24
- Interceptor: MiG-25, MiG-31, Su-9, Su-11, Su-15, Tu-128, Yak-25, Yak-27, Yak-28P
- Transport: An-12, An-22, An-124, Il-76
- Tanker: Il-78

The Soviet Air Forces (Russian: Военно-Воздушные Силы Союза Советских Социалистических Республик, romanized: Voenno-Vozdushnye Sily Soyuza Sovetskih Sotsialisticheskih Respublik, lit. 'Military Air Forces of the Union of Soviet Socialist Republics'; abbr. VVS SSSR; sometimes referred to as the "Red Air Force") was one of two air forces belonging to the Soviet Union. The other was the Soviet Air Defence Forces. The Air Forces were formed from components of the Imperial Russian Air Service in 1917, and faced their greatest test during World War II. The groups were also involved in the Korean War, and dissolved along with the Soviet Union itself in 1991–92. Former Soviet Air Forces' assets were subsequently divided into several air forces of former Soviet republics, including the new Russian Air Force. The "March of the Pilots" was its marching song.

== Origins ==
The first military aviation branch of Russia, or any of the Soviet Union's constituent states was the short-lived Imperial Russian Air Service, founded in 1912 and disbanded in 1917 with the onset of the Bolshevik Revolution and the Russian Civil War. Some former IRAS personnel joined the White Russian side, but unlike the Reds, the Whites never created an official air force.

The first Red move toward creating a military aviation branch was the All-Russia Collegium for the Direction of the Air Forces of the Old Army (translation is uncertain), formed on 20 December 1917. This was a Bolshevik aerial headquarters initially led by Konstantin Akashev. Along with a general postwar military reorganisation, the collegium was reconstituted as the "Workers' and Peasants' Red Air Fleet" (Glavvozduhflot), established on 24 May 1918 and given the top-level departmental status of "Main Directorate".

Approximately 1300 aircraft were inherited from the Imperial Russian Air Service, but as the majority of these planes originated from nations that backed the White Russian side, the actual number of aircraft that flew for the Red side was around 300. 216 Red aviators received the Order of the Red Banner for heroism, 16 of them receiving it twice. The Reds ultimately won the Russian Civil War, breaking the last serious White opposition and effectively ending the conflict by 25 October 1922. Their fledgling air force became known as the Directorate of the USSR Air Forces on 28 March 1924, and then the Directorate of the Workers-Peasants Red Army Air Forces on 1 January 1925.

After the creation of the Soviet state many efforts were made in order to modernize and expand aircraft production, led by its charismatic and energetic commander, General Yakov Alksnis, an eventual victim of Joseph Stalin's Great Purge. Domestic aircraft production increased significantly in the early 1930s and towards the end of the decade, the Soviet Air Force introduced Polikarpov I-15 and I-16 fighters and Tupolev SB and Ilyushin DB-3 bombers.

=== 1927 structure ===
In March 1927, the organizational structure of the Red Army Air Force was as follows:

- Headquarters, VVS RKKA
  - Headquarters Air Forces of the Moscow Military District
    - Headquarters 10th Brigade
      - 25th Aviation Park 1st rank, 26th Aviation 2nd rank, 27th Aviation Park 3rd rank, 28th Aviation Park 3rd rank
      - 7th, 30th, and 40th Aviation Squadrons
      - 20th, 10th, 45th, and 3rd Separate Aviation Detachments
  - Headquarters Air Forces of the Leningrad Military District
    - Headquarters 1st Brigade
      - 1st Aviation Park 1st rank
      - 1st, 28th, 55th, and 57th Aviation Squadrons
      - 1st, 41st, and 85th Separate Aviation Detachments
    - Headquarters 3rd Brigade
      - 6th Aviation Park 1st rank
      - 11th, 33rd and 34th Aviation Squadrons
      - 21st Separate Aviation Detachment
  - Headquarters VVS Belorussian Military District
    - Headquarters 2nd Brigade
      - 11th Aviation Park 1st rank
      - 22nd and 43rd Aviation Squadrons
      - 4th and 43rd Separate Aviation Detachments
    - Headquarters 6th Brigade
      - 13th Aviation Park 1st rank
      - 5th, 9th and 18th Aviation Squadrons
      - 84th Separate Aviation Detachments
    - Headquarters 8th Brigade
      - 15th and 17th Aviation Parks 1st rank
      - 16th and 52nd Aviation Squadrons
      - 5th, 11th, 23rd and 27th Separate Aviation Detachments
  - Headquarters VVS Ukrainian Military District
    - 22nd Aviation Park 2nd rank
    - 24th Aviation Squadron
    - 30th Separate Aviation Detachment
    - Headquarters 5th Brigade
      - 20th Aviation Park 1st rank
      - 3rd, 20th, and 50th Aviation Squadrons
      - 14th, 17th, 37th, and 83rd Separate Aviation Detachments
    - Headquarters 7th Brigade
      - 21st Aviation Park 1st rank, 23rd Aviation Park 2nd rank
      - 31st and 36th Aviation Squadrons
      - 32nd and 8th Separate Aviation Detachments
  - Headquarters Air Forces of the North Caucasus Military District
    - 31st and 32nd Aviation Parks 3rd rank
    - 26th and 9th Separate Aviation Detachments
  - Headquarters VVS Central Asian Military District
    - 37th and 38th Aviation Parks 3rd rank
    - 35th and 40th Separate Aviation Detachments
  - Headquarters VVS Siberian Military District
    - 41st, 42nd, and 43rd Aviation Parks 3rd rank
    - 25th, 19th, and 6th Separate Aviation Detachments
  - Headquarters VVS Red Banner Caucasus Army
    - 34th and 35th Aviation Parks 3rd rank
    - 44th and 70th Separate Aviation Detachments
  - Headquarters VVS Volga Military District
    - 39th Aviation Park 3rd rank
    - 42nd Separate Aviation Detachment
  - Headquarters VVS Baltic Sea Fleet
    - 62nd and 66th Separate Aviation Detachments
  - Headquarters VVS Black Sea Fleet
    - 60th Aviation Squadron
    - 64th, 55th, 48th, 50th, and 53rd Separate Aviation Detachments

Units with honorifics were the 7th Dzerzhinsky, 9th Voroshilov, 16th Ultimatum, 20th Frunze, 24th Ilyich, 30th Red Moscow, and 40th Lenin Aviation Squadrons, and 6th Siberian Revolutionary Committee and 24th Far Eastern Ultimatum Separate Aviation Detachments.

=== Spanish Civil War ===
One of the first major tests for the VVS came in 1936 with the Spanish Civil War, in which the latest Soviet and German aircraft designs were employed against each other in fierce air-to-air combat. At first, the Polikarpov I-16 proved superior to any Luftwaffe or Spanish Nationalist fighters, and managed to achieve local air superiority wherever they were employed. However, the Soviets refused to supply the plane in adequate numbers, and their aerial victories were soon squandered because of their limited use.

The Nationalists, meanwhile, received steady and developing support from their fascist allies in Italy and Germany, who both directly supplied Nationalist flyers and sent their own aircraft and aircrews to fly under thinly veiled disguises, namely bearing Nationalist colours. The Soviet Union ultimately had no answer to the Messerschmitt Bf 109s delivered to Franco's Spanish Nationalist air forces. The 109 steadily won air superiority for the Nationalists, something they would never relinquish. Soviet efforts to back Republican aviators ended in failure in 1939 as the Nationalists won; Franco's far-right government would rule Spain for nearly 40 years.

On 19 November 1939, VVS headquarters was again titled the Main Directorate of the Red Army Air Forces under the WPRA HQ.

== 1930s aviation and propaganda ==
=== Positive heroism ===
The early 1930s saw a shift in ideological focus away from collectivist propaganda and towards "positive heroism." Instead of glorifying socialist collectivism as a means of societal advancement, the Soviet Communist Party began uplifting individuals who committed heroic actions that advanced the cause of socialism. In the case of aviation, the government began glorifying people who utilized aviation technology as opposed to glorifying the technology itself. Pilots such as Valery Chkalov, Georgy Baydukov, Alexander Belyakov, and Mikhail Gromov—as well as many others—were raised to the status of heroes for their piloting skills and achievements.

=== Transpolar flights of 1937 ===
In May 1937, Stalin charged pilots Chkalov, Baydukov, and Belyakov with the mission to navigate the first transpolar flight in history. On 20 June 1937, the aviators landed their ANT-25 in Vancouver, Washington. A month later, Stalin ordered the departure of a second crew to push the boundaries of modern aviation technology even further. In July 1937 Mikhail Gromov, along with his crew Sergei Danilin and Andrei Yumashev, completed the same journey over the North Pole and continuing on to Southern California, creating a new record for the longest nonstop flight.

The public reaction to the transpolar flights was euphoric. The media called the pilots "Bolshevik knights of culture and progress." Soviet citizens celebrated Aviation Day on 18 August with as much zeal as they celebrated the October Revolution anniversary. Literature including poems, short stories, and novels emerged celebrating the feats of the aviator-celebrities. Feature films like Victory, Tales of Heroic Aviators, and Valery Chkalov reinforced the "positive hero" imagery, celebrating the aviators' individuality within the context of a socialist government.

=== Folkloric themes in aviation propaganda ===
Soviet propaganda, newspaper articles, and other forms of media sought to connect Soviet citizens to relevant themes from daily life. For aviation, Stalin's propagandists drew on Russian folklore. Following the successes of the transpolar flights by Chkalov and Gromov in 1937, examples increased dramatically. Aviators were referred to symbolically as sokoly (falcons), orly (eagles), or bogatyr (warriors).

Newspapers told traditional Russian narratives (skazki) of fliers conquering time and space (prostranstvo), overcoming barriers and completing their missions in triumph. Even the story of each aviator suggests roots in old Russian storytelling and narratives—virtuous heroes striving to reach an end goal, encountering and conquering any obstacles in their path. By using folklore rhetoric, Stalin and Soviet propagandists connected aviation achievements to Russian heritage, making aviation seem more accessible to the Soviet population. Furthermore, the narratives emphasize the aviators' selflessness and devotion to a higher socialist ideal, pointing to Soviet leaders as inspirers and role models.

Soviet propagandists also exploited paternalism in aviation culture. The media presented Stalin as an example and inspiration, a father figure and role model to the most prominent Soviet pilots of the period. When recounting stories of meetings between Stalin and Chkalov, for example, Soviet newspapers spoke of Stalin's paternalism towards the young pilot. The paternal metaphor was completed with the addition of a maternal figure—Russia, the motherland, who had produced "father" Stalin's heroic sons such as Chkalov.

The use of familial metaphors not only evoked traditional hereditary pride and historic Russian patriotism, they boosted Stalin's image as a benevolent leader. Most importantly, paternalism served to promote the message of individual subordination to authority. Through his paternal relationships with Soviet pilots, Stalin developed an "ethos of deference and obedience" for Soviet society to emulate.

=== Aviation and the purges ===
The successful achievements in Soviet aviation also came during the worst days of the Great Purge. The transpolar flights in summer 1937 occurred following the arrest and execution of a large body of the Red Army officer corps. Fifteen of sixteen total army commanders were executed; more than three-fourths of the VVS senior officers were arrested, executed, or relieved of duty. News coverage of the arrests was relatively little compared to treatment of aviation exploits, deflecting attention away from the arrests.

== Early combat ==
Some practical combat experience had been gained in participating in the Spanish Civil War, and against Japan in the Far Eastern border conflicts. Shortly before the start of war with Germany a Soviet Volunteer Group was sent to China to train the pilots from the Republic of China Air Force for the continuing war with the Japanese. However, these experiences proved of little use in the Winter War against Finland in 1939, where scores of inexperienced Soviet bomber and fighter pilots were shot down by a relatively small number of Finnish Air Force pilots. The VVS soon learned established Soviet air defence procedures derived from the Spanish Civil War, such as forming defensive circles when attacked, did not work well against the Finns, who employed dive-and-zoom tactics to shoot down their Soviet opponents in great numbers.

On 1 January 1941, six months prior to Operation Barbarossa, the Air Forces of the Soviet Red Army had 363,900 serving personnel, accounting for 8.65% of all military force personnel of the Soviet Union. The first three Air Armies, designated Air Armies of Special Purpose, were created between 1936 and 1938. On 5 November 1940 these were reformed as the Long Range Bombardment Aviation of the High Command of the Red Army (until February 1942) due to lack of combat performance during the Winter War with Finland.

=== Early World War II aviation failures ===
1930s Soviet aviation also had a particular impact on the USSR's military failures in the beginning of World War II. By 1938, the Soviet Union had the largest air force in the world, but Soviet aeronautical design distinctly lagged behind Western technological advances. Instead of focusing on developing tactical aircraft, the Soviets engineers developed heavy bomber planes only good for long distance—in other words, planes that would be used for record-breaking flights like those of Chkalov's. The Soviet government's focus on showy stunts and phenomenal record-breaking missions drained resources needed for Soviet defense. When Nazi Germany attacked the Soviet Union in June 1941, it quickly became apparent that the Soviet Air Force was not prepared for war. Poor planning and lack of organization left planes sitting at airbases, allowing the Luftwaffe to destroy 4,000 Soviet planes within the first week.

== World War II ==
At the outbreak of World War II, the Soviet Armed Forces was not yet ready or suitable for winning a war: Joseph Stalin had said in 1931 Soviet industry was "50 to 100 years behind" the Western powers. By the end of the war, Soviet annual aircraft production had risen sharply, reaching 40,241 in 1944. Some 157,261 machines were produced during the war, 125,655 being of combat types.

Original star roundel in World War II

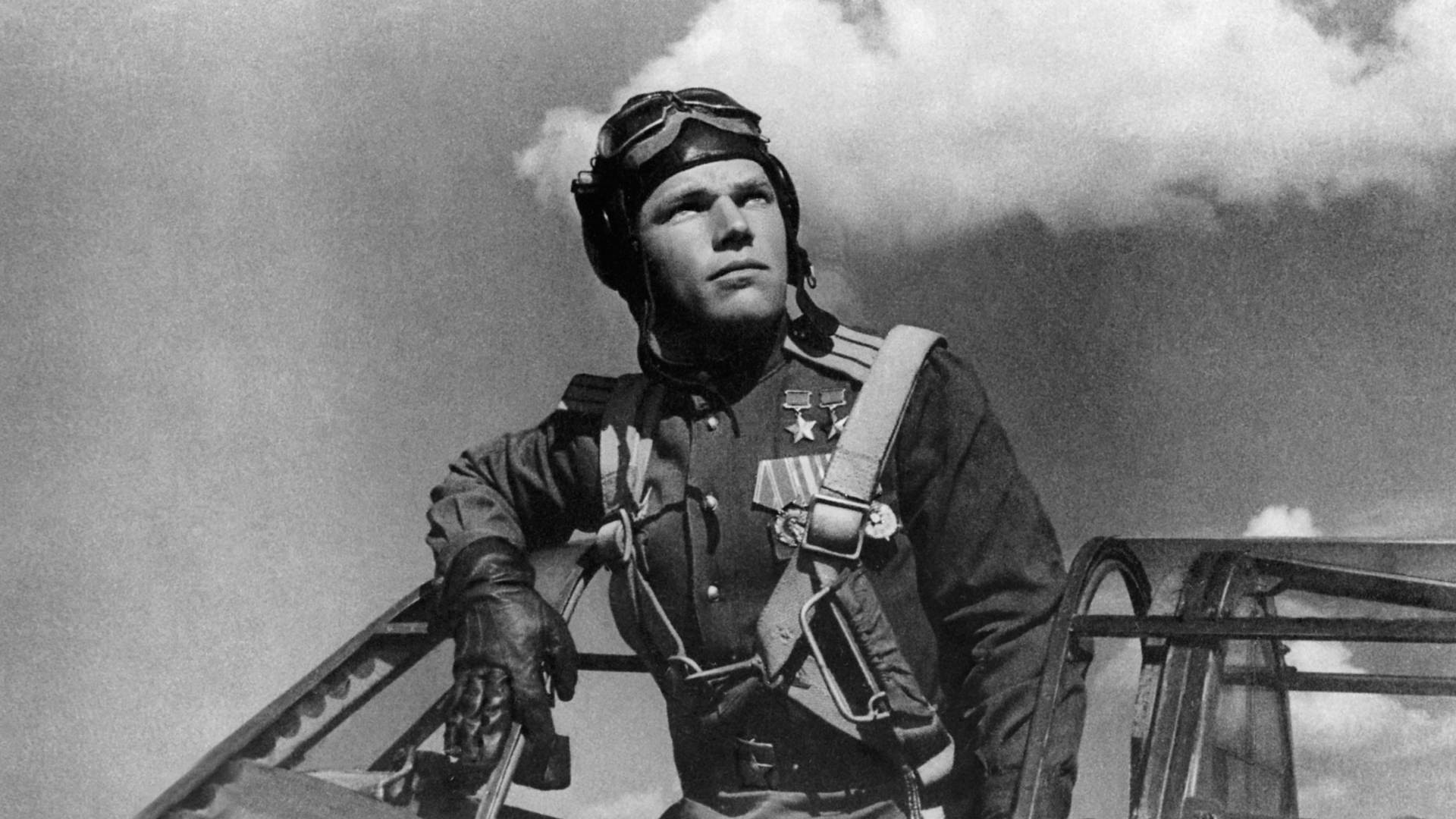
Pilot Ivan Kozhedub during the Second World War

On the outbreak of war the Red Army Air Force consisted of the Long-Range Bomber Aviation (Дальнебомбардировочная авиация); Frontal Aviation, serving the various land forces fronts; Army Aviation; and Force Aviation, all subordinate to the State Defence Committee's Main Directorate of the Air Force of the Red Army. By mid-1943 Frontal Aviation absorbed Army and Force Aviation.

One of the main reasons for the large aircraft losses in the initial period of war with Germany was not the lack of modern tactics, but the lack of experienced pilots and ground support crews, the destruction of many aircraft on the runways due to command failure to disperse them, and the rapid advance of Heer troops, forcing the Soviet pilots on the defensive during Operation Barbarossa, while being confronted with more modern German designs. In the first few days of the invasion of the Soviet Union, the Luftwaffe destroyed some 2,000 Soviet aircraft, most on the ground, at a loss of only 35 (of which 15 were non-combat-related).

The principal VVS aircraft during World War II were the Ilyushin Il-2 Shturmovik armored ground attack monoplane and the series of AS Yakovlev OKB-115 designed single-engined fighters, beginning with the Yak-1 and its successors. The Il-2 became (at 36,183 built) the most produced military aircraft of all time, with the four main versions of Yak fighters (the Yak-1, −3, −7 and −9) being slightly more numerous, at a total of 36,716 among them. These two main types together accounted for about half the strength of the VVS for most of the war. The Yak-1 was a modern 1940 design and had room for development, unlike the mature 1935-origin Messerschmitt Bf 109. The Yak-9 brought the VVS to parity with the Luftwaffe and eventually allowed it to gain the upper hand, until in 1944, many Luftwaffe pilots deliberately avoided combat with the last and best variant, the out-of-sequence numbered Yak-3. The other main VVS types were Lavochkin fighters (mainly the La-5), the Petlyakov Pe-2 twin engined attack-bombers, and a basic but functional and versatile medium bomber, the Ilyushin Il-4.

The 31st Bomber Aviation Regiment, equipped with Pe-2s, was one of the first Guards bomber units in the Air Forces – the 4th Guards Bomber Aviation Regiment. The title was conferred on the regiment for its actions on the Leningrad Front in November–December 1941 during defensive operations and the Soviet counterattack near Tikhvin.

=== Women ===
Alone among World War II combatants, the Soviet Air Force initiated a program to bring women with existing flying training into combat air groups. Marina Raskova, one of very few women in the VVS prior to the war, used her influence with Stalin to form three all-female air regiments: the 586th Fighter Aviation Regiment, the 587th Bomber Aviation Regiment, and the 588th Night Bomber Aviation Regiment (a.k.a. the Night Witches.) Women flew aircraft so heavy that sometimes two of them were required to haul back on the joystick on takeoff.

The latter two air force units were honored by being renamed Guards units. Beyond the three official regiments, individual Soviet women sometimes served alongside airmen in otherwise all-male groups. Women pilots, navigators, gunners, mechanics, armament specialists and other female ground personnel made up more than 3,000 members of the VVS. Women pilots flew 24,000 sorties.

=== Innovation and Lend-lease ===
While there were scores of Red Army divisions on the ground formed from specific Soviet republics, there appears to have been very few aviation regiments formed from nationalities, among them being the 1st Latvian Night Aviation Regiment.

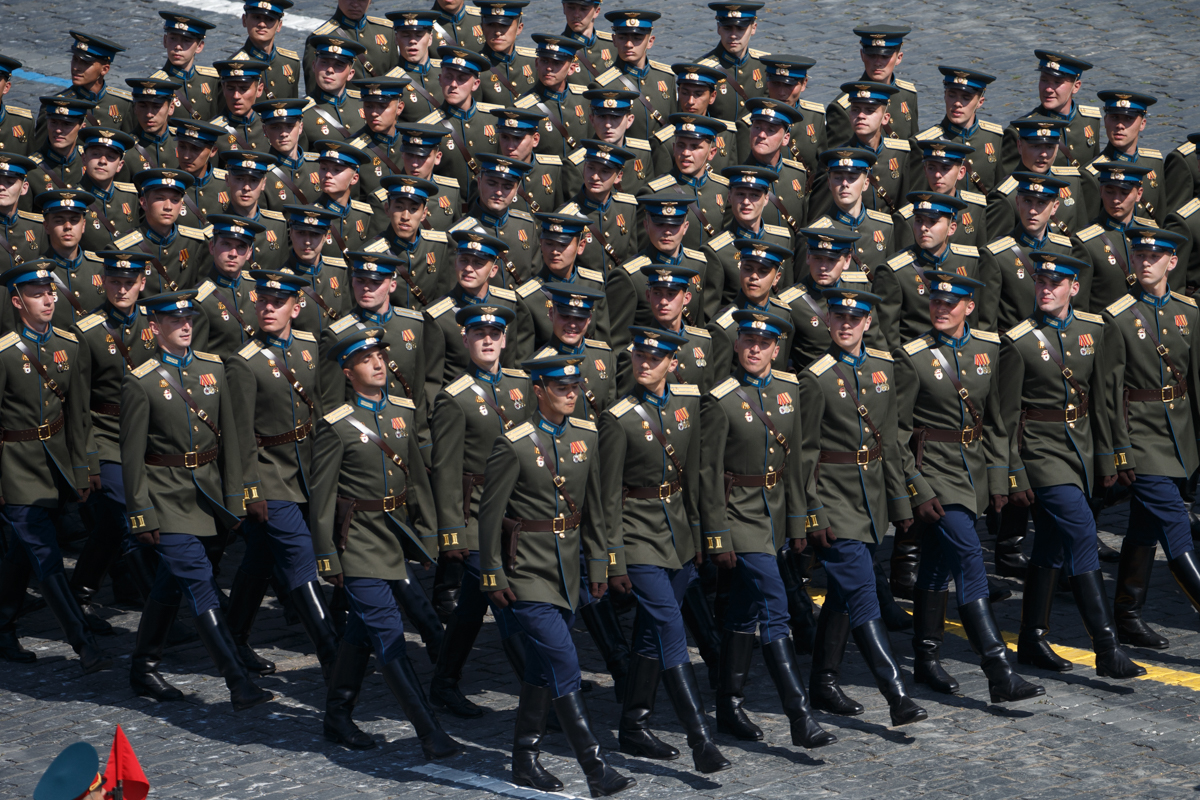
Soviet WWII airmen reenactors on parade in 2020.

Chief Marshal of Aviation Alexander Novikov led the VVS from 1942 to the end of the war, and was credited with introducing several innovations and weapons systems. For the last year of the war German military and civilians retreating towards Berlin were hounded by the presence of "low flying aircraft" strafing and bombing them, an activity in which even the ancient Polikarpov Po-2, a much produced flight training (uchebnyy) biplane of 1920s design, took part. However, this was but a small measure of the experience the Wehrmacht were receiving due to the sophistication and superiority of the Red Air Force. In one strategic operation alone, the Yassy-Kishinev Strategic Offensive, the 5th and 17th Air Armys and the Black Sea Fleet Naval Aviation aircraft achieved a 3.3 to 1 superiority in aircraft over Luftflotte 4 and the Royal Romanian Air Force, allowing almost complete freedom from air harassment for the ground troops of the 2nd and 3rd Ukrainian Fronts.

As with many Allied countries in World War II, the Soviet Union received Western aircraft through Lend-Lease and the Anglo-Soviet Agreement, mostly Bell P-39 Airacobras, Bell P-63 Kingcobras, Curtiss P-40 Kittyhawks, Douglas A-20 Havocs, Hawker Hurricanes, and North American B-25 Mitchells. Some of these aircraft arrived in the Soviet Union in time to participate in the Battle of Moscow, and in particular with the PVO or Soviet Air Defence Forces. Soviet fliers in P-39s scored the highest individual kill totals of any ever to fly a U.S. aircraft. Two air regiments were equipped with Supermarine Spitfire Mk.Vbs in early 1943 but immediately experienced unrelenting losses due to friendly fire as the British aircraft looked too much like the German Bf 109. The Soviet Union was then supplied with some 1,200 Spitfire Mk. IXs from 1943. Soviet pilots liked them but they did not suit Soviet combat tactics and the rough conditions at the forward airfields close to the front lines. Spitfires Mk. IXs were therefore assigned to air defense units, using the high altitude performance to intercept and pursue German bombers and reconnaissance aircraft. By 1944, the Spitfire IX was the main fighter used in this role and would remain so until 1947. Lend-Lease aircraft from the U.S. and UK accounted for nearly 12% of total Soviet air power.

The greatest Soviet fighter ace of World War II was Ivan Nikitovich Kozhedub, who scored 62 victories from 6 July 1943 to 16 April 1945, the top score for any Allied fighter pilot of World War II.

== Cold War ==
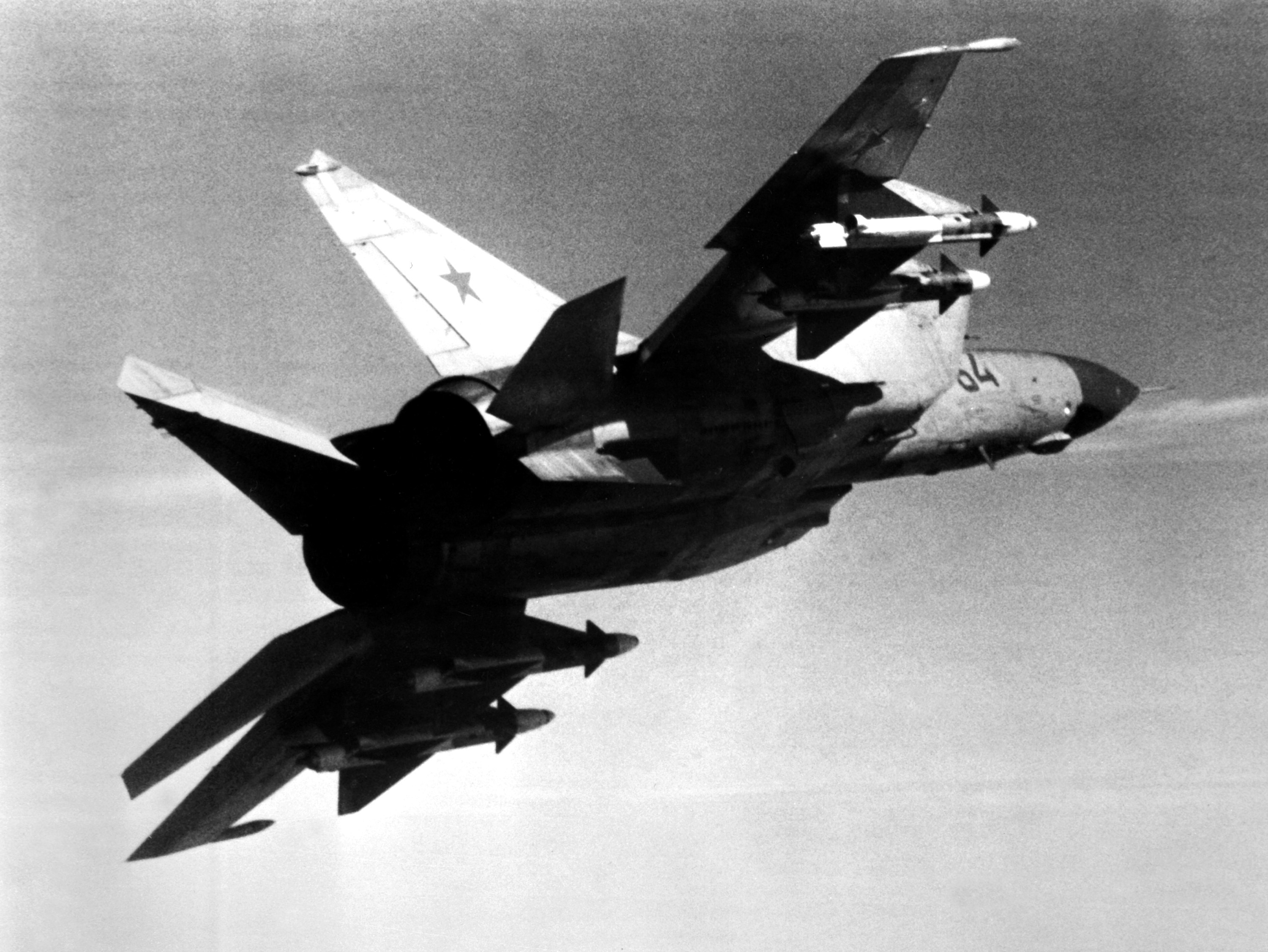
An air-to-air right underside rear view of a Soviet Mikoyan-Gurevich MiG-25 aircraft carrying four AA-6 Acrid missiles

In 1945–46, the WPKA Army Air Forces became the Soviet Air Forces once again. Its capabilities increased, helped by Western transfer of technology: the downed Boeing B-29 Superfortresses in the Far East, and British transfer of Rolls-Royce Nene jet engines. The force became one of the best services of the Soviet Armed Forces due to the various types of aircraft being flown and their capabilities and the strength and training of its pilots. Its air defence arm became an independent component of the armed forces in 1949, reaching full-fledged force status in 1954 as the Soviet Air Defence Force.

During the Cold War, the Soviet Air Force was rearmed, strengthened and modern air doctrines were introduced. At its peak in 1980, it could deploy approximately 10,000 aircraft, making it the world's largest air force of the time.

The Soviet Air Force covertly participated in the Korean War. Twelve fighter divisions of 26,000 pilots participated in air-to-air combat with the U.S. and other Allied air forces, inflicting significant casualties. The 64th Fighter Aviation Corps supervised the Soviet interceptor forces. In order to keep their involvement a secret, Joseph Stalin ordered the Soviet Air Force MiG-15s participating in the conflict to fly with the Korean People's Air Force and PLA Air Force markings, wear Chinese uniforms, and speak only Chinese phrases over radio in the air.

In 1977 the VVS and the Soviet Air Defence Forces were re-organised in the Baltic states and the Leningrad Oblast, as a trial run for the larger re-organisation in 1980 covering the whole country. All fighter units in the PVO were transferred to the VVS, the Air Defence Forces only retaining the anti-aircraft missile units and radar units. The 6th Independent Air Defence Army was disbanded, and the 15th Air Army became the Air Forces of the Baltic Military District. The experiment was then applied countrywide in 1980. Two of the three aviation schools in the Troops of National Air Defence were transferred to the Air Force.

Western analysts found that Soviet non-Slavs, including Jews, Armenians, and Asians were generally barred from senior ranks and from joining elite or strategic positions in the Air Force, Strategic Rocket Forces, and the Soviet Navy because of doubts regarding the loyalty of ethnic minorities. RAND analyst S. Enders Wimbush said, "Soldiers are clearly recruited in a way that reflects the worries of society. The average Russian citizen and Soviet decision maker have questions about the allegiance of the non-Slav, especially the Central Asian." Odom, writing eight years after the collapse of the USSR, noted that 97% of the officer corps was Russian, Ukrainian or Belarusian.

During the Cold War the VVS was divided into three main branches: Long Range Aviation (DA), with long-range bombers; Frontal Aviation (Frontovaya Aviatsiya – FA), focused on battlefield air defence, close air support, and interdiction; and Military Transport Aviation (Voenno-Transportnaya Aviatsiya – VTA), which controlled all transport aircraft. The Soviet Air Defence Force, which operated interceptor aircraft and surface to air missiles, was then a separate and distinct service within the Soviet military organisation. Yet another independent service was the Soviet Navy's air arm, the Soviet Naval Aviation under the Navy Headquarters.

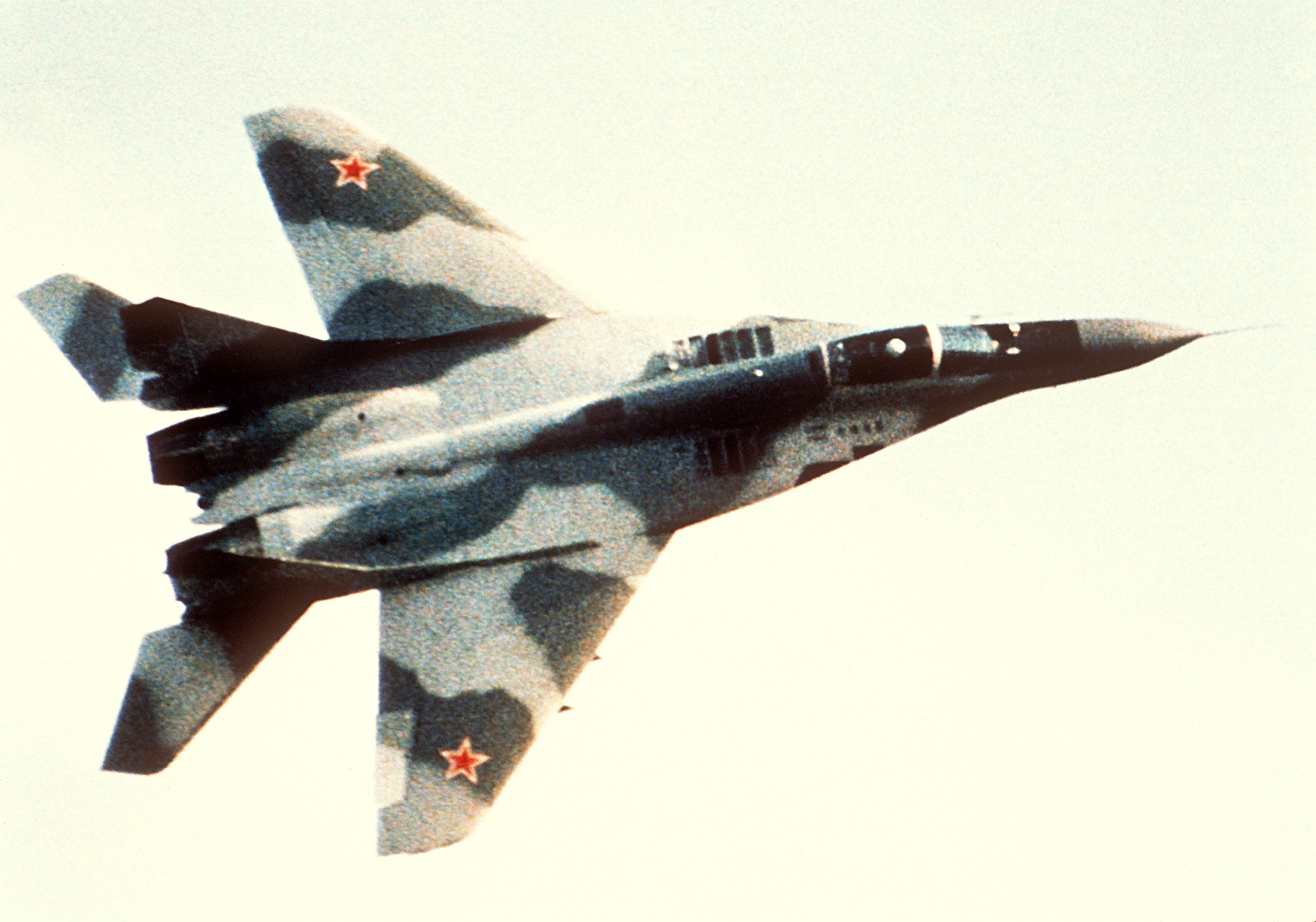
Soviet Mikoyan-Gurevich MiG-29 fighter aircraft in 1989

The official day of VVS was the Soviet Air Fleet Day, that often featured notable air shows meant to display Soviet air power advancements through the years, held in Moscow's Tushino airfield.

=== Breakup of the Soviet Union ===
Following the dissolution of the Soviet Union in December 1991 the aircraft and personnel of the Soviet VVS were divided among the newly independent states. Russia received the plurality of these forces, approximately 40% of the aircraft and 65% of the manpower, with these forming the basis for the new Russian Air Force.

=== Forces in the late 1980s ===
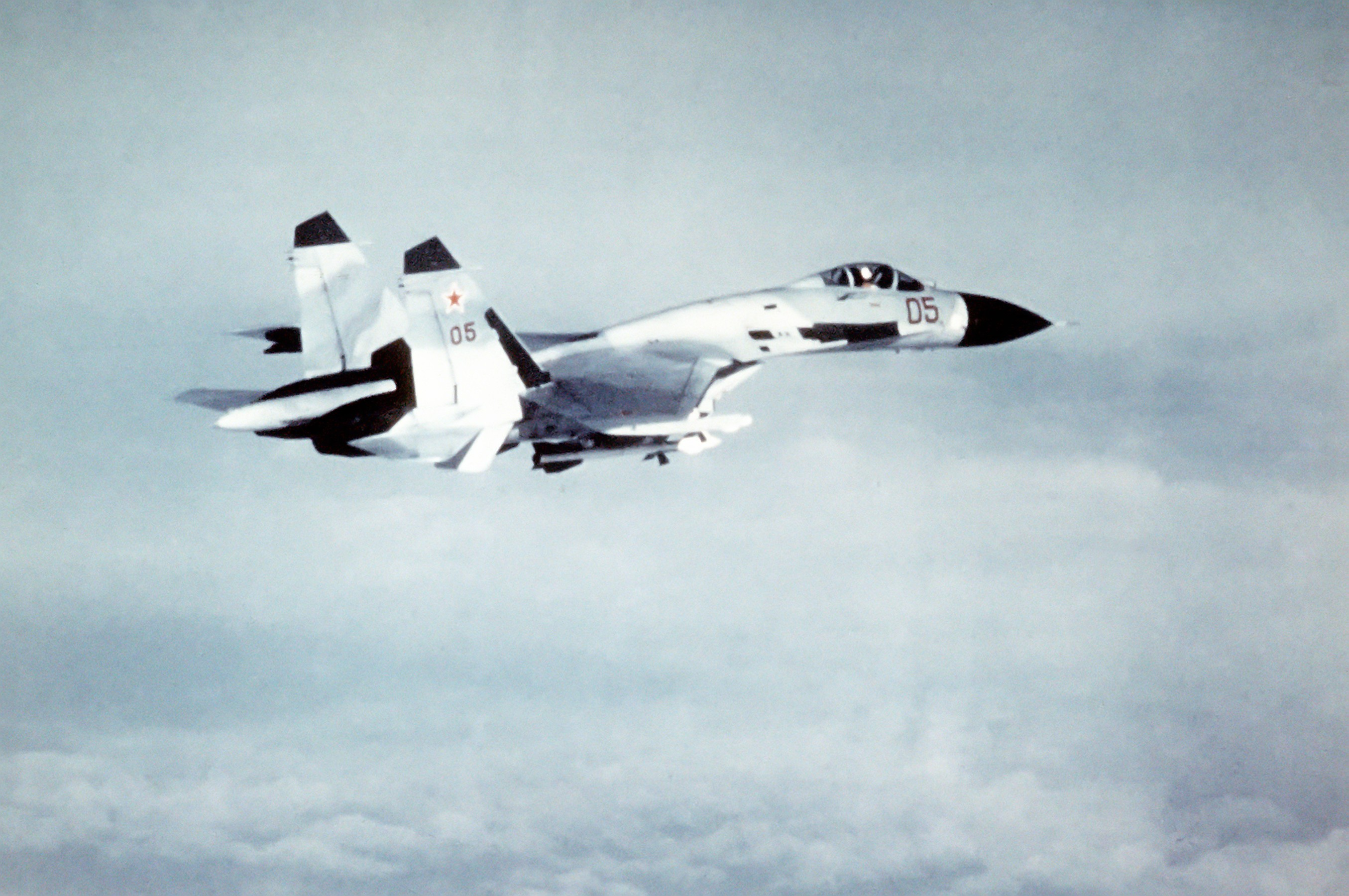
Sukhoi Su-27 Soviet fighter aircraft

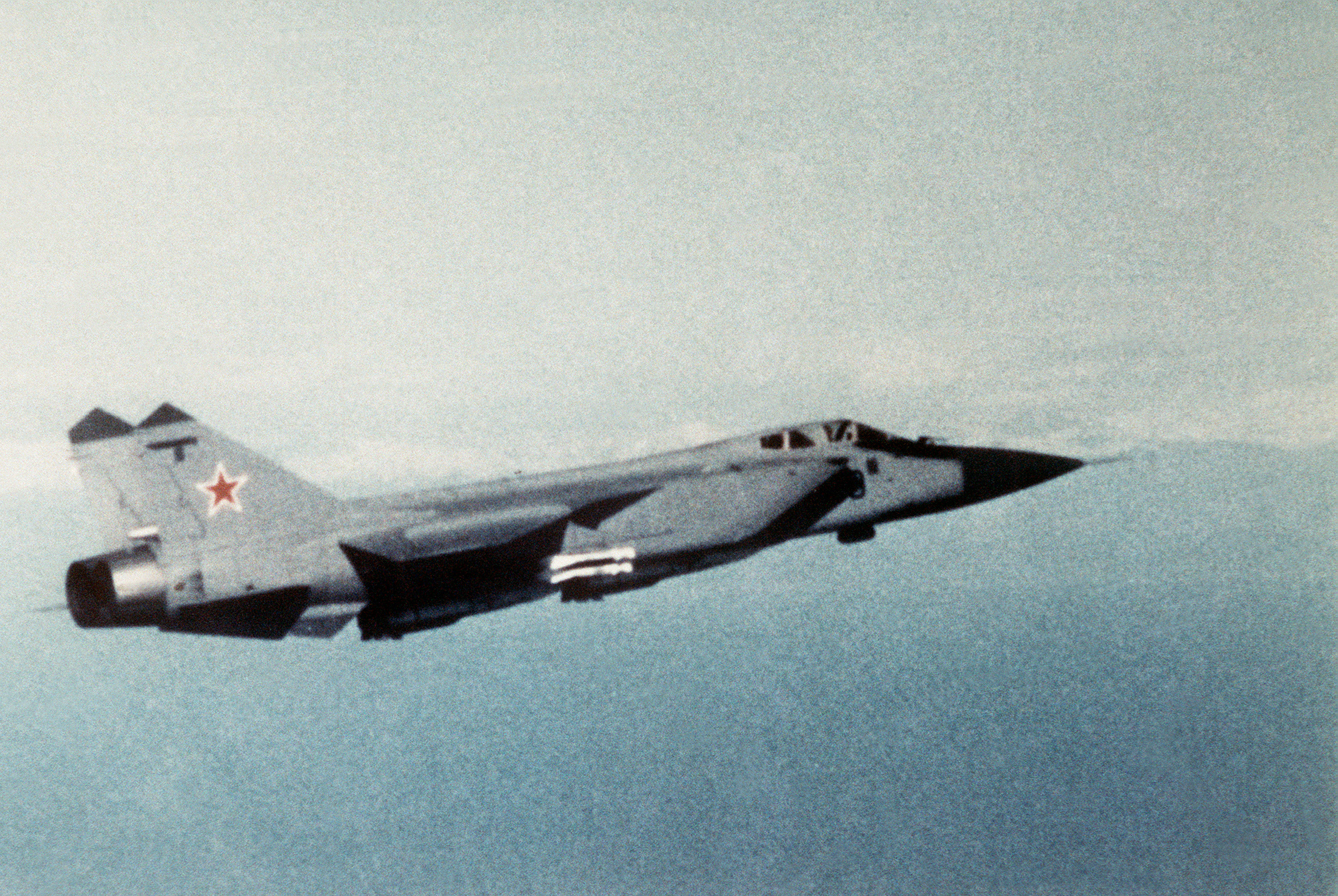
Mikoyan-Gurevich MiG-31 fighter/interceptor aircraft

The Soviet Air Force's aviation assets were organised into four types of forces (sing. вид авиации) - Long Range Aviation, Frontal Aviation, Military Transport Aviation and Army Aviation (which would transfer to the Ground Forces in case of war). Pilot training establishments were integrated into the Air Armies of the Frontal Aviation.

General structure of the Soviet Air Forces
Type of aviation	Aviation arm	Higher command echelons	Notes
Long Range Aviation (дальная авиация)	a single arm	Air Armies of the Supreme Military Command Reserve (Strategic Purpose) (ВА РГК (СН)) under the Air Force Main Staff.	Included: heavy bomber air regiments, heavy bomber reconnaissance air regiments and; in-flight refueling air regiments.
Frontal Aviation (фронтовая авиация)	Fighter aviation (истребительная авиация)	Air Armies of the Supreme Military Command Reserve (Operational Purpose) (ВА РГК (ОН)) under the Air Force Main Staff, to transfer to the High Commands of the Strategic Directions in case of war.; Air Armies (ВА) operationally subordinated to the Military Districts and Groups of Forces.	Provided air cover of the ground forces and escort to own aviation assets. Secondary tasks included ground attack with unguided ordnance, air reconnaissance and tactical nuclear strike. In the late 1980s its types of aircraft included the Su-27S, the MiG-29 and the MiG-23MLD.
Frontal Aviation (фронтовая авиация)	Bomber aviation (бомбардировочная авиация)	Air Armies of the Supreme Military Command Reserve (Operational Purpose) (ВА РГК (ОН)) under the Air Force Main Staff, to transfer to the High Commands of the Strategic Directions in case of war.; Air Armies (ВА) operationally subordinated to the Military Districts and Groups of Forces.	Main mission was penetration of enemy air defences and precision strikes against enemy targets in operational depth. Secondary tasks included close air support, aerial reconnaissance and tactical nuclear strike. In the late 1980s its air regiments flew the Su-24 and the upgraded Su-24M with a handful (no more than 20) of the Suppression of Enemy Air Defenses-specialised Su-24MP variant.
Frontal Aviation (фронтовая авиация)	Fighter-bomber aviation (истребительно-бомбардировочная авиация)	Air Armies of the Supreme Military Command Reserve (Operational Purpose) (ВА РГК (ОН)) under the Air Force Main Staff, to transfer to the High Commands of the Strategic Directions in case of war.; Air Armies (ВА) operationally subordinated to the Military Districts and Groups of Forces.	Main mission was penetration of enemy air defences and precision strikes against enemy targets in tactical depth. Secondary tasks included close air support, aerial reconnaissance and tactical nuclear strike. In the late 1980s its air regiments flew the MiG-27 and (in limited numbers) the Su-17M.
Frontal Aviation (фронтовая авиация)	Ground attack aviation (штурмовая авиация)	Air Armies of the Supreme Military Command Reserve (Operational Purpose) (ВА РГК (ОН)) under the Air Force Main Staff, to transfer to the High Commands of the Strategic Directions in case of war.; Air Armies (ВА) operationally subordinated to the Military Districts and Groups of Forces.	Main mission was battlefield close air support and destruction of armored targets from low and extra low altitude. Its air regiments flew the Su-25.
Frontal Aviation (фронтовая авиация)	Reconnaissance aviation (разведывательная авиация)	Air Armies of the Supreme Military Command Reserve (Operational Purpose) (ВА РГК (ОН)) under the Air Force Main Staff, to transfer to the High Commands of the Strategic Directions in case of war.; Air Armies (ВА) operationally subordinated to the Military Districts and Groups of Forces.	The reconnaissance aviation included two types of units: strategic and operational reconnaissance air regiments flew a squadron of MiG-25R aircraft and 1 or 2 squadrons of Su-24MR aircraft.; tactical reconnaissance air regiments flew 3 squadrons of Su-17M aircraft.
Frontal Aviation (фронтовая авиация)	Transport aviation (транспортная авиация)	Air Armies of the Supreme Military Command Reserve (Operational Purpose) (ВА РГК (ОН)) under the Air Force Main Staff, to transfer to the High Commands of the Strategic Directions in case of war.; Air Armies (ВА) operationally subordinated to the Military Districts and Groups of Forces.	The Military Transport Aviation provided strategic airlift and airborne dropping capabilities to the Soviet military. The transport aviation provided tactical airlift capabilities, liaison and medevac assets. It included Composite Air Regiments and Composite air Squadrons flying mostly An-26 aircraft and Mi-8 helicopters.
Frontal Aviation (фронтовая авиация)	Special Aviation (специальная авиация)	Air Armies of the Supreme Military Command Reserve (Operational Purpose) (ВА РГК (ОН)) under the Air Force Main Staff, to transfer to the High Commands of the Strategic Directions in case of war.; Air Armies (ВА) operationally subordinated to the Military Districts and Groups of Forces.	Main units in this category included electronic warfare and intelligence aircraft, based on modified airliners, EW and ELINT helicopters and aerial command posts, based mostly on the Mi-8 and UAV reconnaissance squadrons.
Military transport aviation (Военно-транспортная авиация)	a single arm	Military Transport Aviation HQ under the Air Force Main Staff.	
Army aviation (армейская авиация)	a single arm	Attached to the Air Armies in peace time. To transfer to the Ground Forces in case of war. At the end of 1990 right before the collapse of the USSR the Army Aviation was transferred to the Ground Forces and became one of their branches.	

==== Higher command echelons of the Air Forces ====
Higher command echelons of the Air Forces
Operationally subordinated to the Main Staff of the Air Forces
		HQ	Notes
Units directly subordinated to the Main Staff of the Air Forces (Части центрального подчинения Главного штаба ВВС)	See Directly subordinated to the AF Main Staff section below.	Moscow, RSFSR	
Military Transport Aviation Command (Командование военнотранспортной авиации)		Moscow, RSFSR	Belonged to the Military Transport Aviation.
Aviation of the Reserve of the Supreme Military Command (Авиация Резерва Главного Командования)	30th Smolenskaya Red Banner Air Army of Strategic Purpose (30-я Смоленская краснознаменная воздушная армия стратегического назначения)	Irkutsk, RSFSR	Belonged to the Long Range Aviation.
Aviation of the Reserve of the Supreme Military Command (Авиация Резерва Главного Командования)	37th Air Army of Strategic Purpose (37-я воздушная армия стратегического назначения)	Moscow, RSFSR	Belonged to the Long Range Aviation.
Aviation of the Reserve of the Supreme Military Command (Авиация Резерва Главного Командования)	46th Air Army of Strategic Purpose (46-я воздушная армия стратегического назначения)	Smolensk, RSFSR	Belonged to the Long Range Aviation.
Aviation of the Reserve of the Supreme Military Command (Авиация Резерва Главного Командования)	4th Air Army of Operational Purpose (4-я воздушная армия оперативного назначения)	Legnica, Polish People's Republic	Belonged to the Frontal Aviation. Under Air Forces HQ in peace time. To transfer to Supreme Command of the Western Strategic Direction control in wartime.
Aviation of the Reserve of the Supreme Military Command (Авиация Резерва Главного Командования)	24th Air Army of Operational Purpose (24-я воздушная армия оперативного назначения)	Vinnitsa, Ukrainian SSR	Belonged to the Frontal Aviation. Under Air Forces HQ in peace time. To transfer to Supreme Command of the South-Western Strategic Direction control in wartime. Based in the Kiev Military District in peace time, which lead to the KMD's own 17th Red Banner Air Army (17-я краснознаменная воздушная армия) being made up of training units in peace time.
Operationally subordinated to the Military Districts and the Groups of Forces
High Command of the Forces of the Western Strategic Direction (Главное командование войск Западного направления) - HQ in Legnica, Polish People's Republic
directly subordinated	(transferred from Air Force HQ in wartime): 4th Air Army of Operational Purpose (4-я воздушная армия оперативного назначения)	Legnica, Polish People's Republic	
Western Group of Forces (Западная группа войск)	16th Red Banner Air Army	Wünsdorf (suburb of Zossen), German Democratic Republic	The Western Group of Forces is the new designation of the recently renamed Group of Soviet Forces in Germany, based in the German Democratic Republic.
Central Group of Forces (Центральная группа войск)	No Air Army. (131st Mixed Air Division)	Milovice, Czechoslovak People's Republic	Central Group of Forces were based in the Czechoslovak People's Republic.
Northern Group of Forces (Северная группа войск)	No Air Army. (4th AIr Army of Operational Purpose was based in the Northern Group of Forces's AOR.)		Northern Group of Forces were based in the Polish People's Republic.
Belorussian Military District(Белорусский военный округ)	26th Red Banner Air Army (26-я краснознаменная воздушная армия)	Minsk, Belarus SSR	On 15 June 1992, by decree No. 05 of the Ministry of Defence of the Republic of Belarus, the 26th Air Army headquarters became the command of the Air Forces of the Republic of Belarus.
Carpathian Military District (Прикарпатский военный округ)	14th Red Banner Air Army	Lviv, Ukrainian SSR	
(Naval forces operationally attached): Twice awarded the Red Banner Baltic Fleet (Дважды Краснознамённый Балтийский флот)	Air Forces of the Baltic Fleet (ВВС Балтийского флота)	Kaliningrad, Kaliningrad Oblast, RSFSR	Belonged to the Naval Aviation.
(Air Defence forces operationally attached):	2nd Separate Air Defence Army (2-я отдельная армия ПВО)	Minsk, Belarus SSR	Belonged to the Air Defence Forces.
High Command of the Forces of the South-Western Strategic Direction (Главное командование войск Южно-Западного направления) - HQ in Chișinău, Moldavian SSR
directly subordinated	(transferred from Air Force HQ in wartime): 24th Air Army of Operational Purpose (24-я воздушная армия оперативного назначения)	Vinnitsa, Ukrainian SSR	
Southern Group of Forces (Южная группа войск)	36th Red Banner Air Army	Debrecen, Hungarian People's Republic	The Southern Group of Forces were based in the Hungarian People's Republic.
Kiev Military District (Киевский военный округ)	17th Red Banner Air Army	Kiev, Ukrainian SSR	Consisted of Air Force higher schools.
Odessa Military District (Одесский военный округ)	5th Red Banner Air Army	Odessa, Ukrainian SSR	
(Naval forces operationally attached): Red Banner Black Sea Fleet	Air Forces of the Black Sea Fleet (ВВС Черноморского флота)	Sevastopol, Ukrainian SSR	Belonged to the Naval Aviation.
High Command of the Forces of the Southern Strategic Direction (Главное командование войск Южного направления) - HQ in Baku, Azerbaijan SSR
North Caucasus Military District (Северо-Кавказский военный округ)	Air Forces of the North Caucasus Military District (ВВС Северо-Кавказского военного округа)		
Transcaucasus Military District (Закавказский военный округ)	34th Air Army	Tbilisi, Georgian SSR	
Turkestan Military District (Туркестанский военный округ)	73rd Air Army	Alma Ata, Kazakh SSR	Until June 1, 1989, the TMD's air army was the 49th Air Army (HQ in Tashkent, Uzbek SSR). The 73rd Air Army controlled the Air Force assets of the Central Asian Military District. On June 1, 1989, the CAMD was disbanded and integrated back into the TMD. The two air armies were therefore also integrated, with the new command retaining the designation of the 73rd.
High Command of the Forces of the Far East (Главное командование войск Дальнего Востока) - HQ in Ulan-Ude, RSFSR
Far Eastern Military District (Дальневосточный военный округ)	1st Red Banner Air Army (1-я краснознаменная воздушная армия)	Khabarovsk, RSFSR	
Transbaikal Military District (Забайкальский военный округ)	23rd Red Banner Air Army	Chita, RSFSR	
(Naval forces operationally attached): Red Banner Pacific Fleet	Air Forces of the Pacific Fleet (ВВС Тихоокеанского флота)	Vladivostok, RSFSR	Belonged to the Naval Aviation.
internal military districts
Moscow Military District (Московский военный округ)	Air Forces of the Moscow Military District (ВВС Московского военного округа)		Formerly the 78th Air Army.
Leningrad Military District (Ленинградский военный округ)	76th Red Banner Air Army	Leningrad, RSFSR	
Baltic Military District (Прибалтийский военный округ)	15th Air Army	Riga, Latvian SSR	
Volga-Ural Military District (Приволжско-Уральский военный округ)	Air Forces of the Volga-Ural Military District (ВВС Приволжско-Уральского военного округа)	Sverdlovsk (present-day Yekaterinburg), RSFSR	The Volga Military District and the Ural Military District were merged on September 1, 1989, into the Volga-Ural Military District. Due to their remoteness from the front lines in a possible armed conflict, the two military district were tasked with mainly with training (including pilot training for the Air Forces). For that reason the newly unified military district held 1st place by total aircraft quantity of all the military districts and groups of forces (1735 units), but this changed to 16th place if only combat aircraft were taken into consideration.
Siberian Military District (Сибирский военный округ)	Air Forces of the SIberian District (ВВС Сибирского военного округа)		Due to its remoteness from the front lines in a possible armed conflict, the SMD were tasked with mainly with training (including pilot training for the Air Forces). For that reason the military district held the median 9th place by total aircraft quantity of all the military districts and groups of forces, but this changed to dead-last 19th place if only combat aircraft were taken into consideration.

In addition, the 34th Mixed Aviation Corps (ru:34-й смешанный авиационный корпус), later re-designated to the Air Forces of the 40th Army, supported the 40th Army in Afghanistan during the Soviet–Afghan War. Its HQ was in Kabul, Democratic Republic of Afghanistan, co-located with the HQ of the 40th Army itself.

==== Directly subordinated to the AF Main Staff ====
Several formations and flying units were directly subordinated to the Air Forces Main Staff (Главный штаб ВВС). They provided air transport for high-ranking government and military officials, flight testing or support to other research and development fields.

Units directly subordinated to the Main Staff:

- 21st Aviation Squadron of Flying Laboratories - Kubinka - An-12, An-26, Mi-8
- 27th Helicopter Squadron - Semipalatinsk, Kazakh SSR - Mi-8 (provided liaison flight support to the Semipalatinsk Test Site, a nuclear test site)
- 101st Test [Support] Aviation Squadron (287th according to some sources) - Nukus, Uzbek SSR - An-26, Mi-8 (provided support to the 8th Chemical Defence Station test range on the Ustyurt Plateau)
- 220th Test [Support] Aviation Squadron of Specific Purpose - Aralsk, Kazakh SSR - An-72, An-26, Mi-26, Mi-8, An-2 (provided airborne telemetric surveillance support to the Kapustin Yar missile test range. The airfield also provided liaison flights to the top-secret "Barkhan" bacteriological warfare test range on Vozrozhdeniya Island)
- unidentified Aviation Squadron - Klin - Tu-134, An-12, An-26, An-24, Mi-8 (Klin air base was also considered the 'household' airfield of the Air Defence Forces aviation and a mixed air regiment was based there with the mission to provide liaison flights to the Air Defence Forces Main Staff and flight skills refreshment for the high ranking pilot officers)
- Transport Aviation Squadron - Privolzhskiy (near Astrakhan) - Il-18, An-26, Mi-8 (provided liaison flights to the 116th Combat Application Training Center of the Air Defence Aviation
- 2nd State Central Test Range (designation in some sources given as the) - Semipalatinsk
  - Transport Aviation Squadron - ZATO Kurchatov-21 (also listed sometimes as the Semipalatinsk-21) - An-30RR, An-24RR, Mi-8/9 (RR - Radiation Reconnaissance)
  - Transport Aviation Squadron - Semipalatinsk (Zhanasemei airfield) - An-30, An-24RR
- 5th Central Scientific Research Institute (designation in some sources given as the - Voronezh
  - Composite Aviation Squadron - Voronezh Airport - Il-20, Mi-8 (EW)
- 8th Aviation Division of Specific Purpose - Chkalovsky
  - 353th Aviation Regiment of Specific Purpose - Chkalovsky - Il-62, Tu-154, Tu-134, Il-18, Il-76, An-72
  - 354th Aviation Regiment of Specific Purpose - Chkalovsky - Il-76, Il-22, An-12, An-26, An-24
  - (355th Aviation Regiment of Specific Purpose - Chkalovsky - disbanded in 1989 and absorbed into the 353rd Aviation Regiment along with its Tu-134 and Tu- 154 aircraft)
  - Composite Aviation Squadron - Chkalovsky - Il-80 (4 aircraft), Il-76RT (2 aircraft) (attached to the 8th ADSP for air traffic control, ground support and maintenance, but reporting directly to the Ministry of Defence. The Il-80 was the airborne command center variant of the Il-86 and the Soviet counterpart to the E-4. The four Il-80 received command task force of officers detailed from the Ministry of Defence when on airborne duty. The two Il-76RT were relay aircraft (RT - 'retranslator') and had no command task force on board. They provided Ultra high frequency link between the Soviet nuclear triad and the command centers and were equipped with drag antennae array, which could extend to a total length of 6 kilometers. The Navy's SSBNs and the Air Force's Long Range Aviation normally used alternative communications channels, so the main task for the Il-76RTs remained to provide a link to the Strategic Rocket Forces. The command and control system was designated "Chain Link" ("Звено") and included the Il-80s, the Il-76RTs, the underground silo-based 'Perimetr' and the railway-based 'Gorn' command alert missiles.)
- High Command of the Forces of the Southern Strategic Direction - Baku, Azerbaijan SSR
  - 300th Composite Aviation Squadron - Kala - Tu-154, Tu-134, Il-22, An-26, An-24, Mi-6, Mi-8/9, Ka-27PS, An-2, Mi-2
- High Command of the Forces of the South-Western Strategic Direction - Kishinev, Moldavian SSR
  - 153rd Composite Aviation Squadron - Kishinev - Tu-134, Il-22, An-72, An-26, An-24, Mi-8/9
- Warsaw Pact Organisation
  - 25th Composite Aviation Squadron - Legnica and Krzywa, Polish People's Republic - Tu-134, Il-22, An-12, An-72, An-26, Mi-8
  - 100th Helicopter Flight - Damascus, Syrian Arab Republic - Mi-8PPA/SMV/MTPI (supporting the Soviet military advisors embedded in the Syrian military)
- 929th State Flight Test Center named after V. P. Chkalov of the Ministry of Defence of the USSR - Akhtubinsk (testing of each type of military aircraft destined for the Air Force, Air Defence Forces, Naval Aviation and export)
  - 75th Composite Aviation Regiment - Akhtubinsk - Ан-12, Ан-26, Ан-24, Ан-72, Ту-154, Ми-8
  - 333rd Composite Aviation Regiment - Akhtubinsk - Tu-16, MiG-21
  - Air Force Test Pilots Training Center - Akhtubinsk - MiG-21, L-39, Yak-40, An-26, Mi-8
  - Composite Aviation Regiment of Specific Purpose - Су-27, МиГ-29, Ка-25, Ка-27, Ми-14, Ка-29, Ан-12, Ан-72, Ил-38, Ту-142, MI-6, Mi-8, Як-38 (flight testing of naval aviation)
  - 368th Composite Aviation Squadron - Nalchik Airport - An-12, Mi-8 (mountain testing)
  - 47th Composite Aviation Squadron - An-26, Mi-8
  - Composite Aviation Squadron - Il-76, An-12, An-72, An-26
  - Helicopter Squadron - Mi-26, Mi-6, Mi-8
  - Aviation Flight (possibly two separate air flights based at Chkalovsky, one flying Il-20 and another one flying Il-22)
- Nizhny Tagil Metal Proving Institute
  - Flight Test Base - Salka airfield, Nizhny Tagil - Tu-16, Su-24, Su-25, MiG-21, An-12, An-24 (testing of aviation armaments)

==== Military Transport Aviation ====
The Soviet Military Transport Aviation had the following structure in the end of the 1980s:

Military Transport Aviation Command, Moscow, RSFSR

- 18th Guards Taganrogskaya, awarded the Order of the Red Banner, the Order of Suvorov and the Order of Kutuzov Military Transport Aviation Division, Šiauliai, Lithuanian SSR
  - 128th Guards Leningradskiy, awarded the Order of the Red Banner Military Transport Aviation Regiment, Panevėžys, Lithuanian SSR - Ilyushin Il-76M
  - 196th Guards Minskiy Military Transport Aviation Regiment, Tartu, Estonian SSR - Ilyushin Il-76M
  - 600th Military Transport Aviation Regiment, Kėdainiai, Lithuanian SSR - Ilyushin Il-76
  - 117th Berlinskiy, awarded the Order of Kutuzov Aviation Regiment for Radio-electronic warfare, Šiauliai, Lithuanian SSR - Antonov An-12PP/PPS
- 6th Guards Zaporozhskaya, awarded the Order of Bogdan Khmelnitsky Military Transport Aviation Division, Kryvyi Rih, Ukrainian SSR
  - 37th Military Transport Aviation Regiment, Artsyz, Ukrainian SSR - Ilyushin Il-76
  - 338th Military Transport Aviation Regiment, Zaporizhzhia, Ukrainian SSR - Ilyushin Il-76
  - 363rd Cherkaskiy, awarded the Order of Suvorov and the Order of Bogdan Khmelnitsky Military Transport Aviation Regiment, Kryvyi Rih, Ukrainian SSR - Ilyushin Il-76
- 7th Military Transport Aviation Division Melitopol, Ukrainian SSR
  - 25th Moskovskiy Military Transport Aviation Regiment - Ilyushin Il-76
  - 175th Military Transport Aviation Regiment - Ilyushin Il-76
  - 369th Military Transport Aviation Regiment - Ilyushin Il-76
- 3rd Guards Smolenskaya, awarded the Order of Suvorov and the Order of Kutuzov Military Transport Aviation Division, Vitebsk, Byelorussian SSR
  - 110th Military Transport Aviation Regiment, Krechevitsy (near Novgorod), RSFSR - Ilyushin Il-76
  - 334th Berlin Red Banner, Vitebsk, Byelorussian SSR - Ilyushin Il-76
- 12th Mginskaya Red Banner Military Transport Aviation Division, Tver, RSFSR
  - 566th Solnechnogorskiy, awarded the Order of the Red Banner and the Order of Kutuzov Military Transport Aviation Regiment, Seshta (near Bryansk), RSFSR - Antonov An-124
  - 978th Military Transport Aviation Regiment, Seshta (near Bryansk), RSFSR - Antonov An-124 (2 squadrons), Ilyushin Il-76 (1 squadron)
  - 8th Military Transport Aviation Regiment, Tver, RSFSR - Antonov An-22
  - 81st Military Transport Aviation Regiment, Ivanovo - Severny - Antonov An-22
- separate Military Transport Aviation regiments:
  - 192nd Guards Kerchenskiy Red Banner Military Transport Aviation Regiment, Ukkurey, Chita Oblast, RSFSR - Ilyushin Il-76MD
  - 708th Military Transport Aviation Regiment, Taganrog, Rostov Oblast, RSFSR - Ilyushin Il-76MD
  - 930th Komsomolskiy Transylvanskiy Red Banner Military Transport Aviation Regiment, Zavitinsk, Amur Oblast, RSFSR - Antonov An-12
  - 194th Guards Bryanskiy Red Banner Military Transport Aviation Regiment named after N. F. Gastello, Fergana, Uzbek SSR - Antonov An-12
- training establishments
  - 610th Center for Combat Training and Conversion of Flight Personnel of the Military Transport Aviation, Ivanovo - Severny - Ilyushin Il-76 (2 training and 1 test and evaluation squadrons)
- wartime mobilization assets
  - the State-owned flag carrier Aeroflot was wartime mobilization reserve to the Military Transport Aviation, with some Il-76 aircraft of the civilian air company as much as retaining the aft self-defence gun turrets (Aeroflot Il-76MD)
- airlift assets outside the Military Transport Aviation
  - 8th Aviation Division of Special Purpose, Moscow - Chkalovskiy Air Base, RSFSR - transport and command aviation unit for the USSR's high officials
    - 70th Transport Regiment of Special Purpose, Moscow - Chkalovskiy Air Base, RSFSR - Ilyushin Il-62, Il-86, Il-76
    - 353rd Transport Regiment of Special Purpose, Moscow - Chkalovskiy Air Base, RSFSR - Antonov An-12, An-26, An-24
    - 354th Transport Regiment of Special Purpose, Moscow - Chkalovskiy Air Base, RSFSR - Tupolev Tu-134, Tu-154
    - Separate Aviation Squadron for Command and Retranslation, Moscow - Chkalovskiy Air Base, RSFSR - Ilyushin Il-80, Il-82
  - Each Strategic Direction Command and each Military District also had a Composite Aviation Regiment, which included An-24, An-26 (possibly An-12) transport aircraft, Mi-8 (possibly) Mi-2 helicopters and a Tu-134 as the commander of the strategic direction or the military district's personal transport aircraft.

==== Training schools of the VVS and PVO ====
A Krasnaya Zvezda military schools list of 17 January 1980 included 24 Air Forces schools. Nine Higher Aviation Schools of Pilots were reported (including the Borisoglebsk Higher Military Aviation School of Pilots at Borisoglebsk), two navigator schools (including the Chelyabinsk Higher Military Aviation School of Navigators/50th Anniversary of the Komsomols), the Khar'kov Higher Military Aviation Command School of Signals, five three-year technical secondary schools, six Air Force engineering schools (including the Kiev Higher Military Aviation Engineering School), and the Kurgan Higher Military-Political Aviation School.

In 1988, schools included:

- 5th Central Course for Preparation and Improvement of Aviation Personnel, Frunze, Chui Oblast, Kyrgyz SSR (HQ VVS)
- 796th Red Banner Center for Preparation of Officers for Fighter and Fighter-Bomber Aviation, Totskoye, Orenburg Oblast (HQ VVS)
- Armavir Higher Military Aviation School for Pilots PVO (Air Forces of the North Caucasus Military District)
- Balashov Higher Military Aviation School for Pilots (Air Forces of the Volga-Ural Military District)
- Barnaul Higher Military Aviation School of Pilots (HQ Barnaul, Altai Krai)(Air Forces of the Siberian Military District) - 44th (Panfilovo), 54th, 99th, 662nd Training Aviation Regiments in 1990.
- Borisoglebsk Higher Military Aviation School of Pilots (Borisoglebsk, VVS NCMD)
- Chelyabinsk Higher Military Aviation School of Navigators
- Kacha Higher Military Aviation School of Pilots (Volgograd, HQ VVS)(ru:Качинское высшее военное авиационное училище лётчиков)
- Kansk Military Aviation School of Air Rifle-Radio Operators VVS (Kansk, VVS Siberian Military District)
- Krasnodar Higher United Flight-Technical School (Krasnodar, VVS NCMD; ru:Краснодарское высшее военное авиационное училище лётчиков)
- Orenburg Higher Military Aviation School for Pilots (Orenburg, VVS Volga-Ural Military District)
- Saratov Higher Military Aviation School for Pilots (Saratov, VVS Volga-Urals Military District; helicopter training)
- Stavropol Higher Military Aviation School for Pilots and Navigators PVO (Stavropol, VVS North Caucasus Military District)
- Syzran Higher Military Aviation School for Pilots
- Tambov Higher Military Aviation School for Pilots (Tambov, Tambov Oblast, Air Forces of the Moscow Military District)
- Ufa Higher Military Aviation School for Pilots (Ufa)
- Yeysk Higher Military Aviation School for Pilots (Yeysk, ru:Ейский высший военный авиационный институт)
- 17th Air Army (Kiev Military District, primarily a training force)
  - Chernigov Higher Military Aviation School for Pilots (Chernigov, VVS Kiev Military District)
  - Kharkov Higher Military Aviation School for Pilots (Kharkiv-Chuguyev, VVS Kiev Military District)
  - Voroshilovgrad Higher Military Aviation School of Navigators (Lugansk)

There is also a list of Soviet Air Force bases listing the various air bases of the force.

== Soviet Air Force inventory in 1990 ==
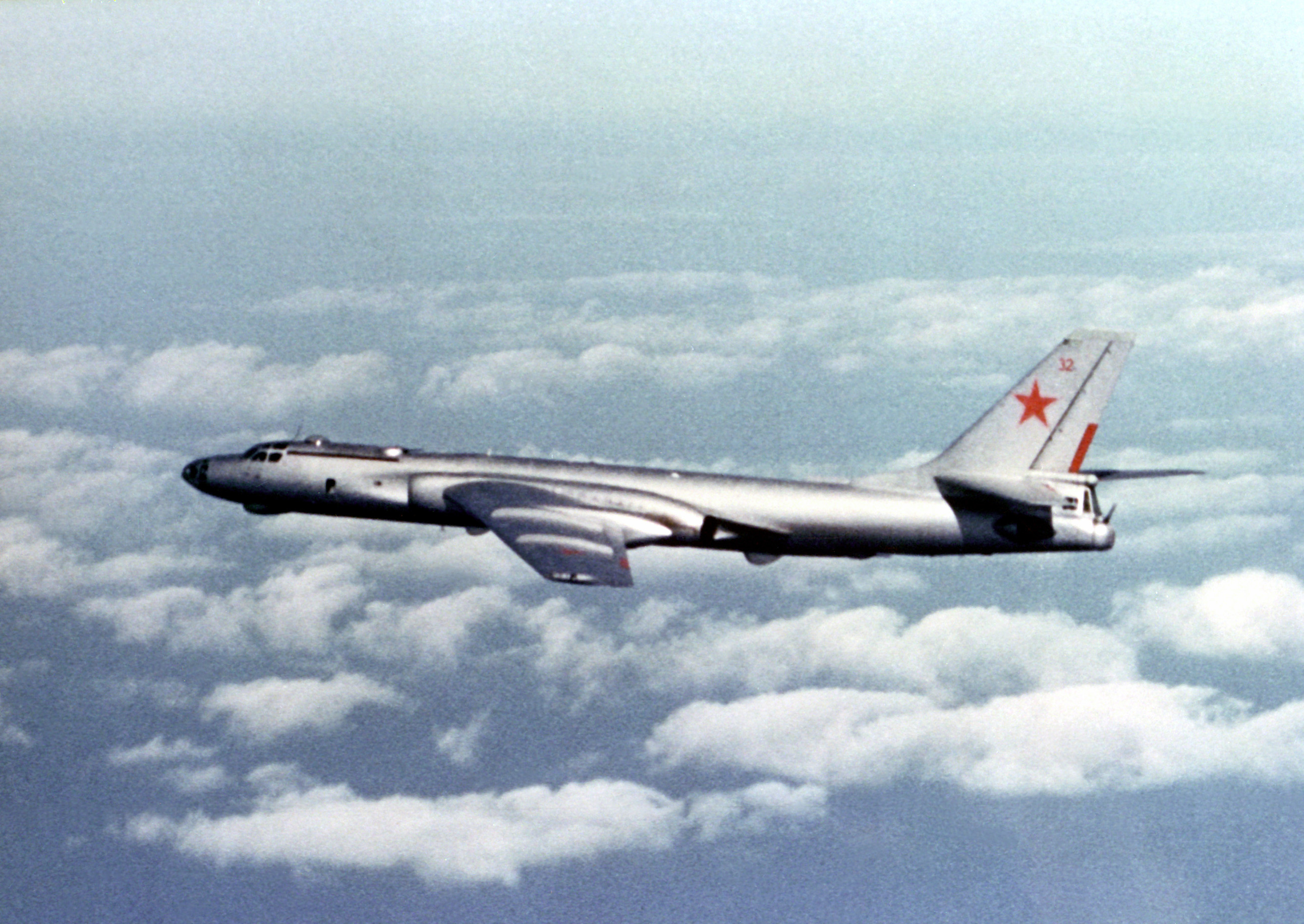
Tupolev Tu-16

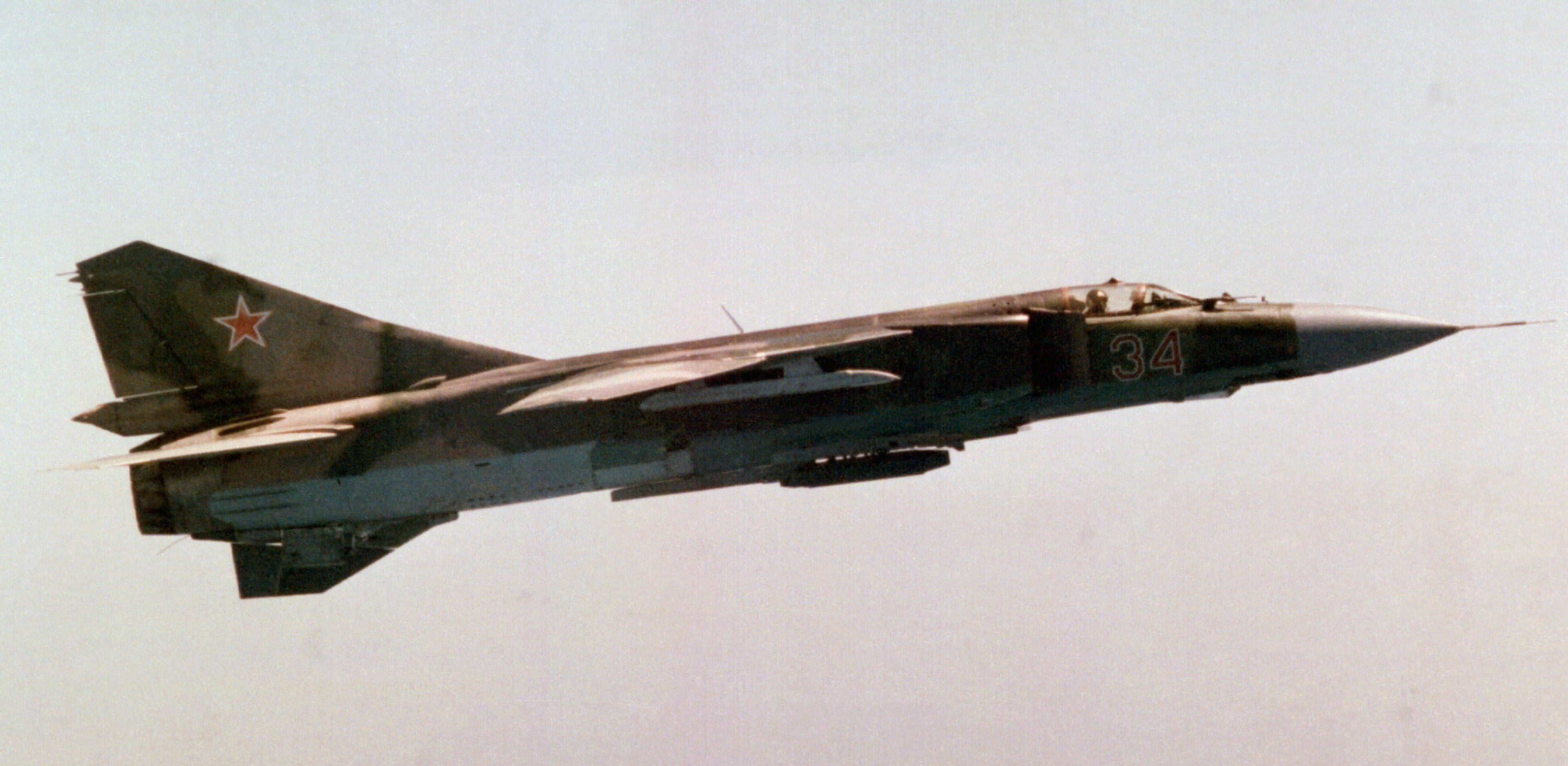
Mikoyan-Gurevich MiG-23

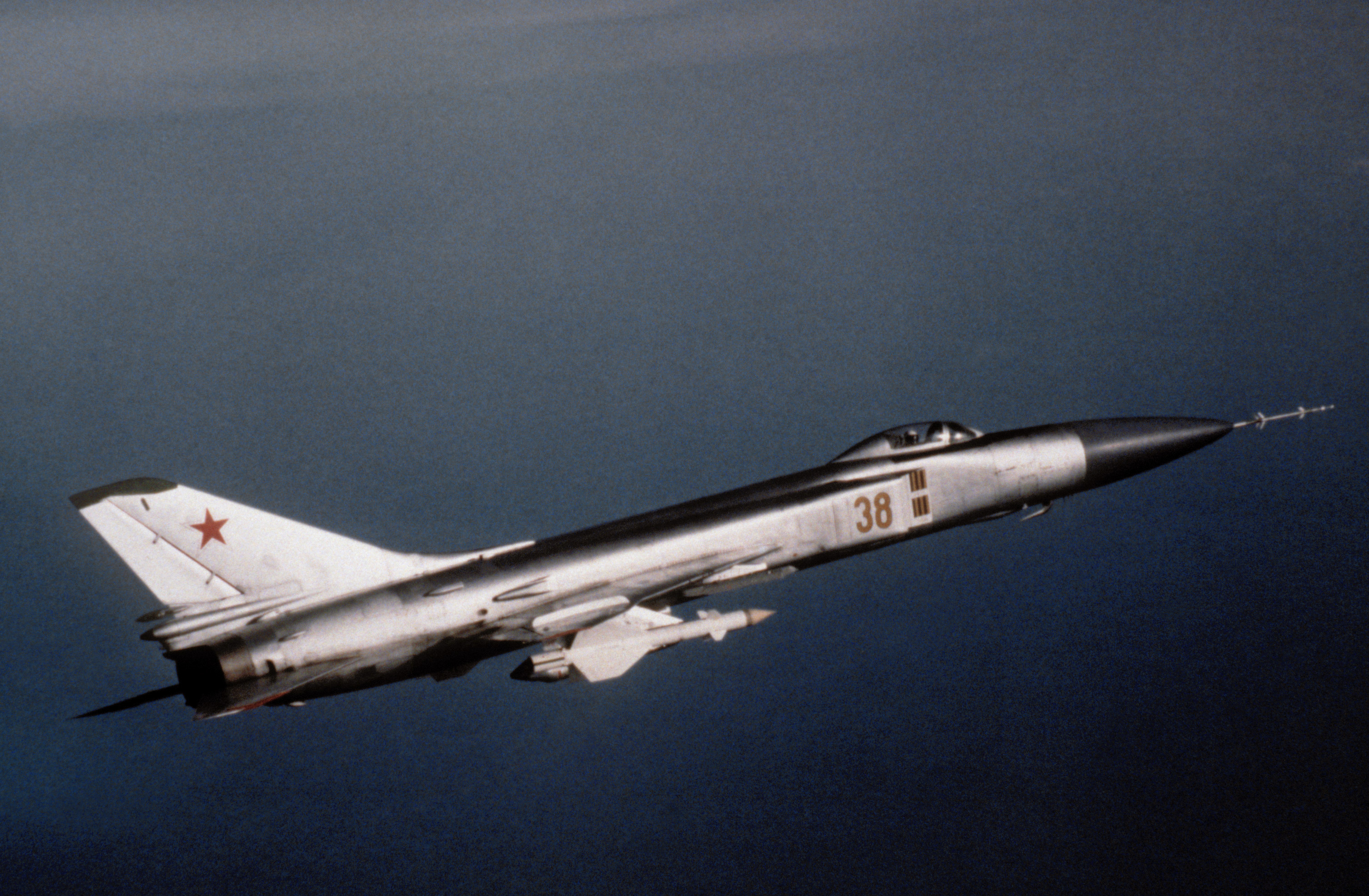
Sukhoi Su-15

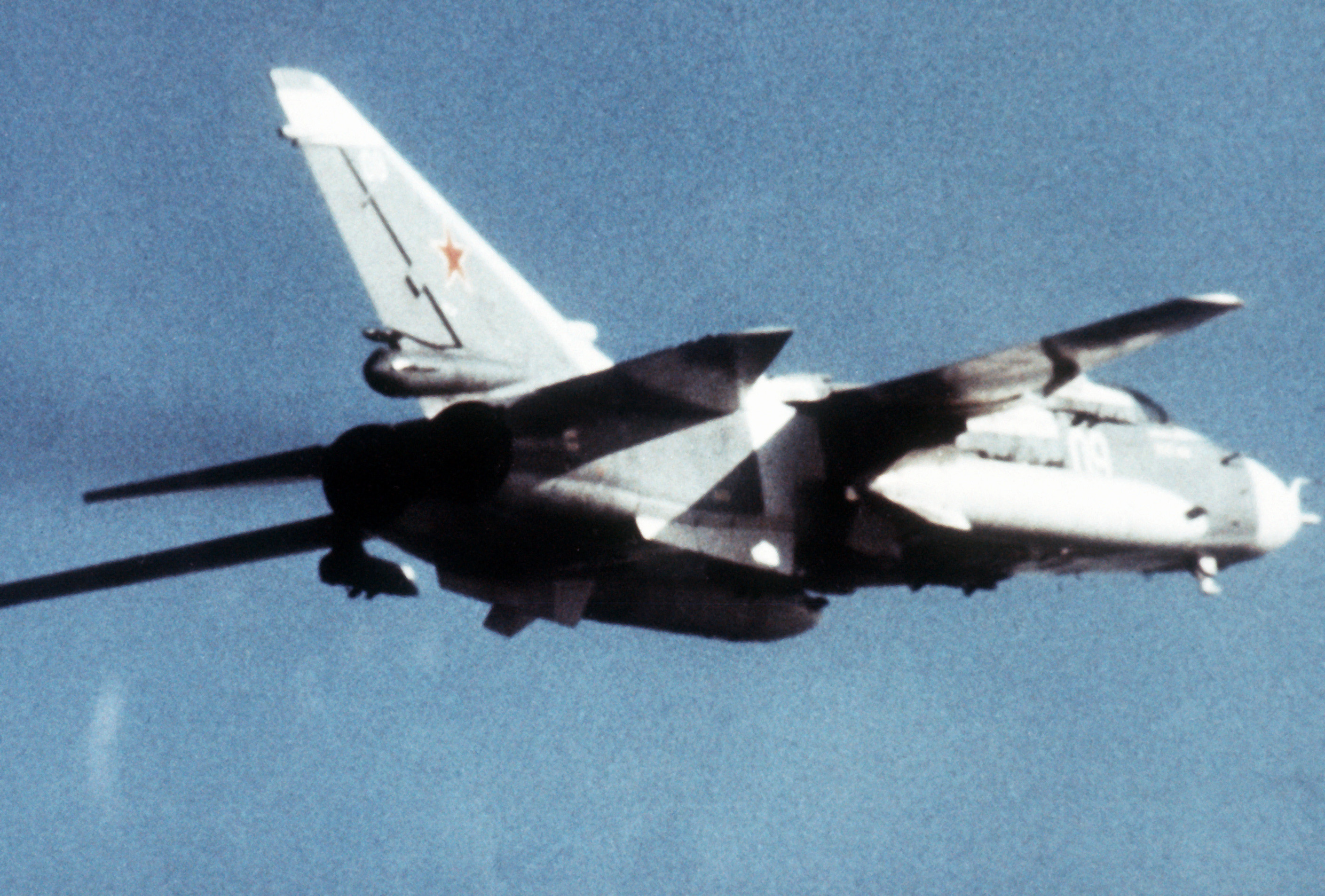
Sukhoi Su-24

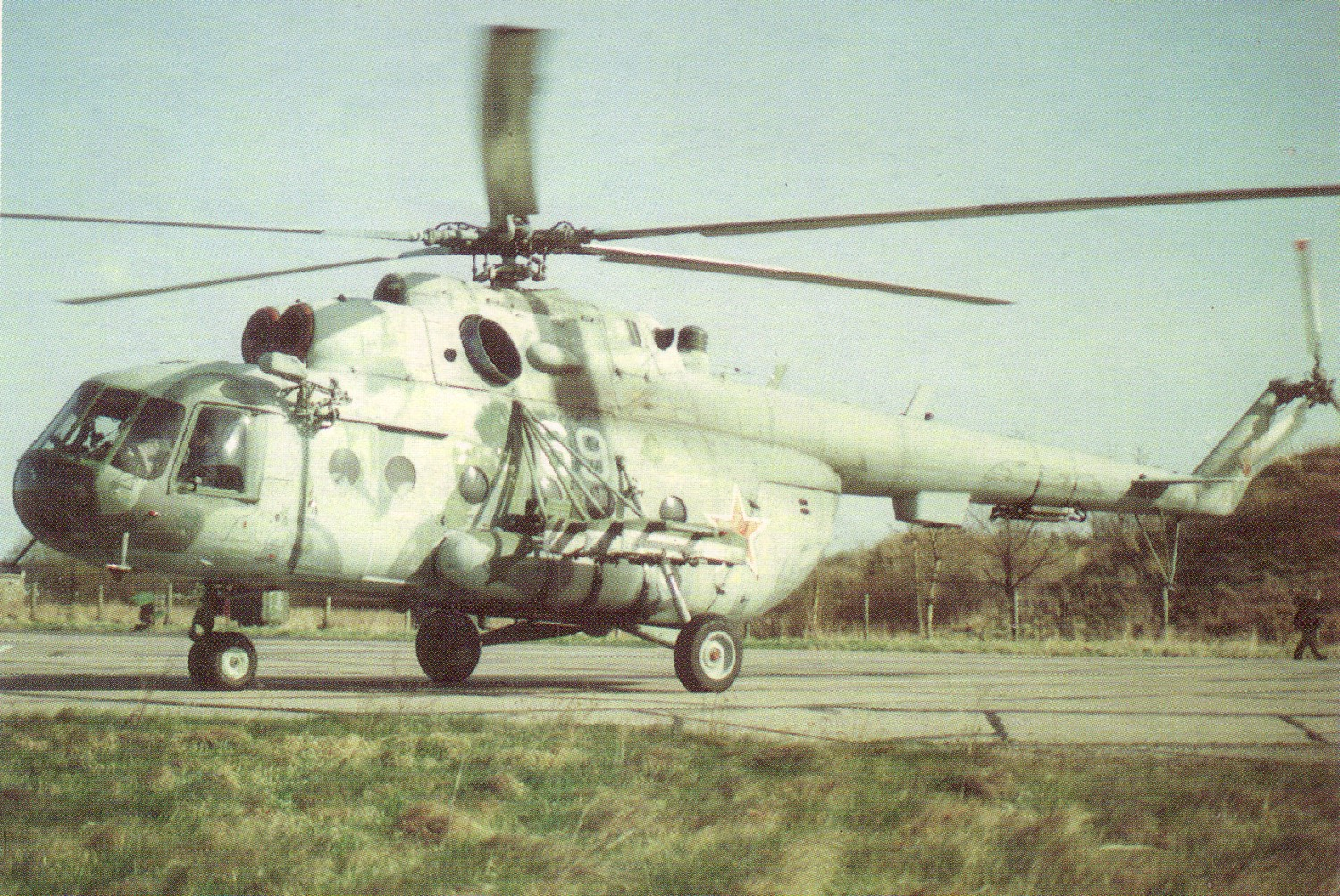
Mil Mi-8T

175 strategic bombers
160 Tupolev Tu-95
15 Tupolev Tu-160

390 medium bombers
80 Tupolev Tu-16
120 Tupolev Tu-22
190 Tupolev Tu-22M

1,275 fighters
50 Mikoyan-Gurevich MiG-21
595 Mikoyan-Gurevich MiG-23
90 Sukhoi Su-27
540 Mikoyan MiG-29

2,510 attack aircraft
535 Sukhoi Su-17
830 Sukhoi Su-24
340 Sukhoi Su-25
905 Mikoyan MiG-27

74 tankers
14 Ilyushin Il-78
40 Myasishchev M-4 'Molot'
20 Tupolev Tu-16

835 Reconnaissance and Electronic countermeasures (ECM) aircraft
50 Mikoyan-Gurevich MiG-21
160 Mikoyan-Gurevich MiG-25
135 Sukhoi Su-17
150 Sukhoi Su-24
170 Yakovlev Yak-28
120 Tupolev Tu-16
20 Tupolev Tu-22M
30 Ilyushin Il-22

577 transport aircraft
12 Antonov An-124
55 Antonov An-22
125 Antonov An-12
385 Ilyushin Il-76
2,935 civilian and other transport aircraft, usually Aeroflot aircraft which were easily converted

== USSR roundel variations ==
The red five-pointed star without a border was used until 1943.
A red star with a black circular border inside the star was sometimes used in the 20s and 30s
The red star with black border was used between 1941 and 1943, but was gradually phased out.
In the early forties, many air forces around the world began to outline their roundels with a white border. The Soviet Union experimented with this as well. At the end of 1942, red stars began to be outlined almost everywhere with white paint; in 1943, a star with a white border became the standard identification mark of the Red Army Air Force.
The red star with a yellow border was used extremely rarely during 1942–1945.
A red star with convex shading and a white and red border is known as the "Kremlin Star." Used sparingly during 1940–1945.
A red five-pointed star with a white and red border began to appear for the first time on Soviet aircraft in late 1943 and began to be widely used in subsequent years. Since 1945, such a star has been used almost everywhere. The identification mark was applied to the upper and lower surfaces of the wing, the vertical tail and the sides of the rear fuselage. In the fifties, this version of the identification mark was called the victory star. It was used by the USSR Air Force until its collapse, and by the Russian Air Force until 2010 and again since 2013. Currently, it is used by the Armed Forces of the Republic of Belarus.

== See also ==
- List of Russian aviators
- List of Russian aerospace engineers
- Soviet air shows

== Bibliography ==
- Andersson, Lennart. Soviet Aircraft and Aviation, 1917–1941. Annapolis, MD: Naval Institute Press, 1994. ISBN 1-55750-770-8.
- Bailes, Kendall (1976). "Technology and Legitimacy: Soviet Aviation and Stalinism in the 1930s". Technology and Culture. 17 (1): 55–81. doi:10.2307/3103253. JSTOR 3103253. (January 1976)
- Bergman, Jay (January 1998). "Valerii Chkalov: Soviet Pilot as New Soviet Man". Journal of Contemporary History 33 (1): 136.
- Boyd, Alexander. The Soviet Air Force Since 1918. New York: Stein and Day, 1977. With section of black-and-white photographic plates, charts. maps and diagrams, together with index. First published in The Soviet Air Force by Macdonald and Janes (UK) in 1977.
- Cooper, Tom (July–August 2002). "'Floggers" in Action: Early MiG-23s in Operational Service". Air Enthusiast. No. 100. pp. 56–67. ISSN 0143-5450.
- Wimbush, S. Enders; Alexiev, Alex (1982). The ethnic factor in the Soviet Armed Forces. RAND.
- Guest, Carl-Fredrick. "Talkback". Air Enthusiast, No. 18, April – July 1982. pp. 78–79. ISSN 0143-5450.
- Kotelnikov, V.; Kulikov, V. & Cony, C. (November 2001). "Les avions français en URSS, 1921–1941" [French Aircraft in the USSR, 1921–1941]. Avions: Toute l'Aéronautique et son histoire (in French) (104): 37–56. ISSN 1243-8650.
- Kotelnikov, V.; Kulikov, V. & Cony, C. (December 2001). "Les avions français en URSS, 1921–1941". Avions: Toute l'Aéronautique et son histoire (in French) (105): 50–56. ISSN 1243-8650.
- Loza, D. F. Attack of the Airacobras: Soviet Aces, American P-39s, and the Air War Against Germany. Lawrence, KS: University Press of Kansas, 2001. ISBN 0-7006-1140-1.
- Mason, Richard Anthony, and John William Ransom Taylor. Aircraft, strategy, and operations of the Soviet Air Force. London: Jane's, 1986.
- Moynahan, Brian (1989). Claws of the Bear: The History of the Red Army from the Revolution to the Present.
- Palmer, Scott (2005). "Icarus, East: The Symbolic Contexts of Russian Flight". The Slavic and East European Journal 49 (1): 38.
- Pennington, Reina. (2002) Wings, Women, and War: Soviet Airwomen in World War II Combat. Lawrence, KS: University Press of Kansas, 2002. ISBN 0-7006-1145-2.
- Von Hardesty; Ilya Grinberg (2012). Red Phoenix Rising: The Soviet Air Force in World War II (2nd ed.). University Press of Kansas. ISBN 978-0-7006-1828-6.
- Wagner, Ray (ed.), Fetzer, Leland, (trans.), The Soviet Air Force in World War II: The Official History, Wren Publishing, Melbourne, 1973 ISBN 0-85885-194-6
- Whiting, Kenneth (1986). Soviet Air Power (Revised Ed). Boulder, Colorado: Westview Press.
- Yeliseyev, Sergey (2016). Организационное строительство отечественных военно-воздушных сил (1930–1931 гг.) (PDF) (in Russian). Moscow: Center of Military Strategic Research, Military Academy of the General Staff.
- "Советские Войска ПВО в последние годы Союза ССР. Часть 1" by A.G. Lenskiy and M.M. Tsybin, Saint Petersburg 2013, 164 pages
- "Все истребительные авиаполки Сталина" by V. Anokhin and M Bykhov, Moscow 2014, 944 pages
