= PNV =

PNV may refer to:

== Political parties ==
- Basque Nationalist Party (Partido Nacionalista Vasco)
- For Our Valley (Pour Notre Vallée), centrist party in the Aosta Valley, Italy
- Venetian National Party (Partito Nasionał Veneto), Venetian separatist and libertarian party, Italy

== Other meanings ==
- Prenatal vitamins
- Potential natural vegetation
- Pinigura, a language of Western Australia (ISO 639-3 code: pnv)
- Panevėžys Air Base, IATA code PNV
