= Taganrog-Central air base =

Military airport in Rostov Oblast, Russia

Taganrog/Tsentralnyy
- Taganrog, Rostov Oblast in Russia
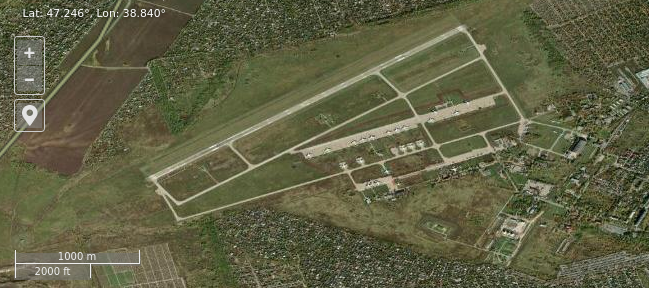
- Satellite imagery of Taganrog-Central air base

Site information
- Type: Air Base
- Owner: Ministry of Defence
- Operator: Russian Aerospace Forces
- Controlled by: Military Transport Aviation

Location
- Shown within Rostov Oblast, Russia Taganrog (Russia)
- Coordinates: 47°14′46″N 38°50′24″E

Site history
- Built: 1938
- In use: 1938 - present
- Battles/wars: 2022 Russian invasion of Ukraine

Airfield information
- Elevation: 45 metres (148 ft) AMSL
Runways
Direction	Length and surface
05L/23R	2,503 metres (8,212 ft) Concrete

Taganrog-Central is a military airfield in the city of Taganrog, Rostov Oblast, Russia. It has one concrete runway.

Military transport aviation (5th Aviation Group of the 6955th Avb) is deployed on aircraft Ilyushin Il-76 and the 325th Aircraft Repair Plant.

The airport has its own aviation museum.

The base is home to the 708th Military Transport Aviation Regiment of the 18th Guards Military Transport Aviation Division and Open Joint Stock Company State Airline (224 Flight Detachment).

As part of the 2022 Russian invasion of Ukraine, Russian aircraft that were initially deployed to Belarus, were redeployed to here during August 2022.

== History ==
The history of the airfield dates back to 1938 with the Taganrog military school of pilots. Since 1948, the Higher Officer Flight Tactical Courses began work, based on the Taganrog-Central airfield, training an assault air regiment (aircraft Ilyushin Il-10, MiG-15bis).

In 1960, the Second Central Flight Tactical Officer Enhancement Courses (II TsLTKUOS) were disbanded, and the 963rd Aviation Regiment of the EYVAUL was redeployed to the Taganrog-Tsentralny airfield of the Krasnodar Territory. The regiment was stationed here until its disbandment in November 1994.

In April–May 1992, from Ganja, Azerbaijan the base was transferred to Taganrog 708th Military Transport Aviation Regiment. In 1995, the 192nd Guards Kerch Red Banner Military Transport Aviation Regiment, which was stationed in the Trans-Baikal region, was liquidated. Ukurey, the garrison Ared (Ukyurey - 2); the honorary titles of the disbanded regiment crossed the 708th VTAP. At present, the 708th transport regiment has been reorganized into the 5th aviation group of the 6955th Guards Minsk Aviation Base of the 1st category, without changing the place of deployment.

325th Aviation Repair Plant (military unit 23213) dates back to the 14th mobile repair shop established in 1941. The plant has been located in Taganrog since 1948 and up to the present, the main task is to repair transport aircraft of the type Antonov An-12, Antonov An-72 and units for Ilyushin Il-76, Tupolev Tu-142, Sukhoi Su-25, Sukhoi Su-27, helicopters Mil Mi-8 and Mil Mi-24. At the beginning of the 90s of the last century, a base for the liquidation of front-line aviation equipment was formed at the plant — about 300 fighters and fighter-bombers were cut into metal.

On the basis of the decision of the Military Council of the 61st Supreme Command of the Supreme Command (Military Aviation Administration) (Minutes No. 8 of August 31, 2002), by the order of the Commander of the 61st Supreme Soviet of the Supreme Command (VTA) of September 9, 2002 No. 236 to the Il-76MD reg. No. RA-76740 of the 708th Guards Kerch Red Banner Military Transport Aviation Regiment was given the honorary title Taganrog.

On 7 September 2026, Ukrainian drones struck the Taganrog-Central air base, striking a Mi-35 and a Mi-8.

== Museum ==
In 1995, the commander of the base for the liquidation of the AT, Colonel A. Kornienko, and the chief engineer of the base, Lieutenant Colonel V. Stoyanov, turned to the commander of the 4th Air Army, General Mikhailov VS with the proposal to save one aircraft of each type to create a museum of aviation technology. By the directive of the commander of the 4th IA of April 23, 1995, 4 aircraft of different types planned for cutting were allowed to leave as exhibits of the future aviation museum.

On the former training ground of the 963rd ALM, a room for the museum was built and a site for outdoor exhibits prepared. From the disbanded Martsevskaya school of junior aviation specialists (military unit 06749), an L-39 aircraft was towed to the museum, and an L-29 aircraft from the Morozovsk garrison.

In Yeisk passed on the metal Yak-38. Lt. Col. V. Stoyanov, begging a trailer from the head of the Taganrog garrison, went to Yeisk for a future exhibit, but colleagues from the Yeisk recycling base agreed to donate the Yak fuselage only for the equal amount of non-ferrous metal scrap.

From the airfield TANTK them. G.M.Beryeva the An-2 plane was flown to the museum, on which the aviator, Hero of the Soviet Union flew V. Grizodubova.

Due to bureaucratic obstacles and dishonesty, it was not possible to save the glad potential exhibits of the museum. In particular, it was not possible to agree with the leadership of TANTK on the preservation of a experimental aircraft Bartini Beriev VVA-14 design R. L. Bartini, which was simply cut into colored matter. The same fate befell another sample - the cabin of a supersonic bomber Sukhoi T-4 structures P.O. Sukhoi.

As of 2017, the museum has 12 aircraft (Yakovlev Yak-38, Aero L-29 Delfín, Aero L-39 Albatros, Mil Mi-2, Antonov An-2T, Mikoyan-Gurevich MiG-19S, Mikoyan-Gurevich MiG-21bis, Mikoyan-Gurevich MiG-23MLD, Mikoyan-Gurevich MiG-25BM, Beriev Be-12P, Sukhoi Su-17UM, Su-17M3). Also on display are the nose of the Tupolev Tu-154M, 10 types of engines, including training-cutting D-30KP, AL-21F-300, AI-25, training samples of aviation equipment and aircraft, and equipment kits for the pilot. The museum exhibits a collection of more than 250 aviation miniatures, a library of technical and aviation literature, and a video library. The museum is a division of the 325th ARZ with a staff of two people.

The museum is open on weekdays.

== See also ==
- List of military airbases in Russia
