= Military Transport Aviation =

Major command of the Russian Air Force

Military Transport Aviation (Cold War – 1998/9) 61st Air Army (1998/9 – 2009) Military Transport Aviation (2009–)
- Active: 1955–1998; 1998–2009; 2009–
- Country: Soviet Union, Russia
- Branch: Russian Air Force
- Type: Military transport aircraft formation
- Size: 9 regiments
- Anniversaries: 1 June

The Military Transport Aviation Command (Russian: Кома́ндование вое́нно-тра́нспортной авиа́ции (ВТА) — Komandovaniye voyenno-transportnoy aviatsii (VTA)) was a major component of the former Soviet Air Forces, active from the Cold War period, through the dissolution of the Soviet Union, to 1998–1999. In 1999–2009 it was reduced in status to the 61st Air Army of the Supreme High Command (61 Vozdushnaya Armiya VGK). The 61st Air Army itself was initially formed on 10 January 1949 by renaming the 3rd Air Army. In 2009 the 61st Air Army was renamed the Command of Military Transport Aviation. Its headquarters is located in Moscow.

== History ==
The VTA traces its history to the formation of the first transport aviation unit in the Leningrad Military District on 1 June 1931. In 1955–56 air transport units were removed from the Soviet Airborne Troops and the VTA itself was created.

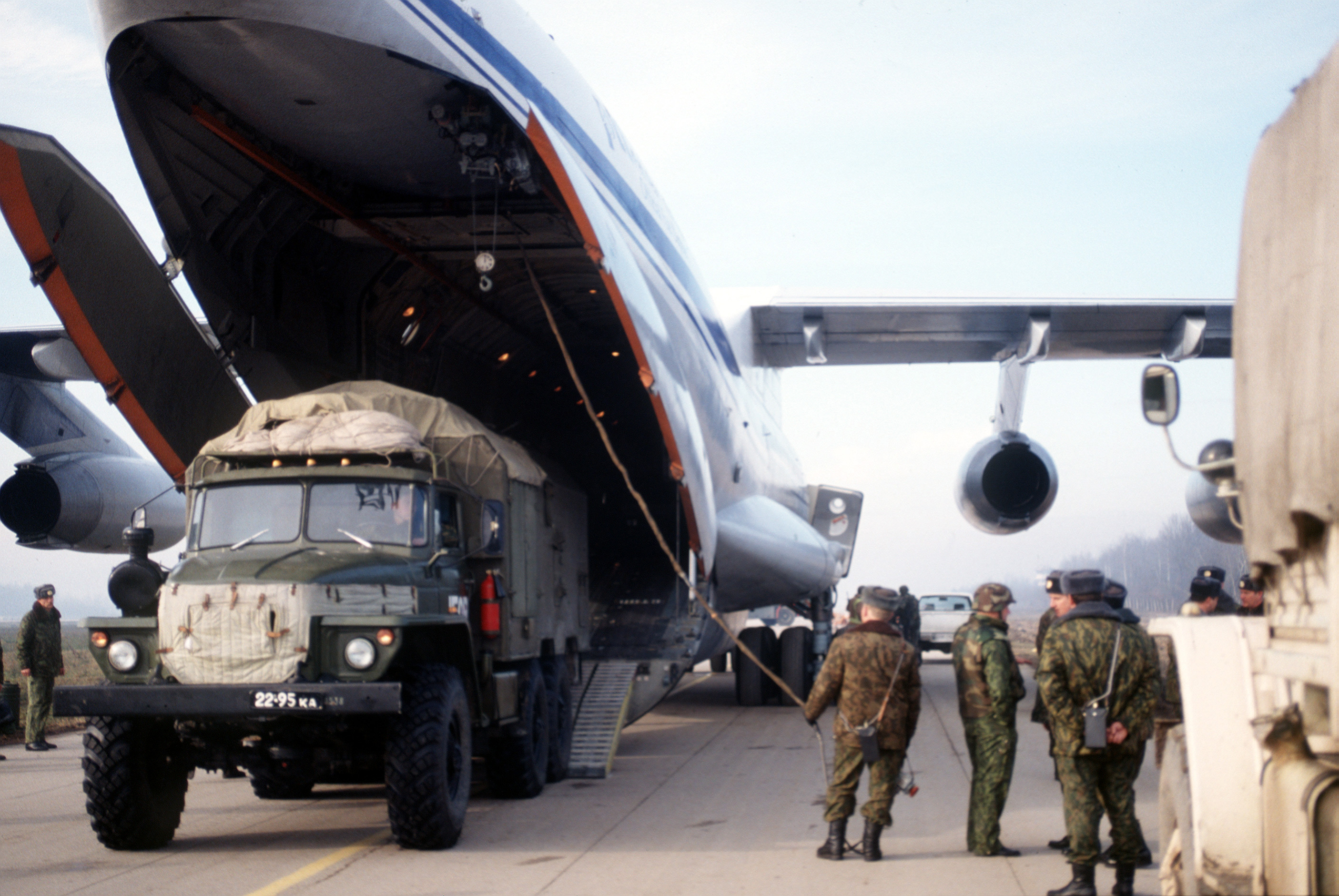
Unloading the Ural-4320 from the Il-76 at the Tuzla airfield in Bosnia, January 1996

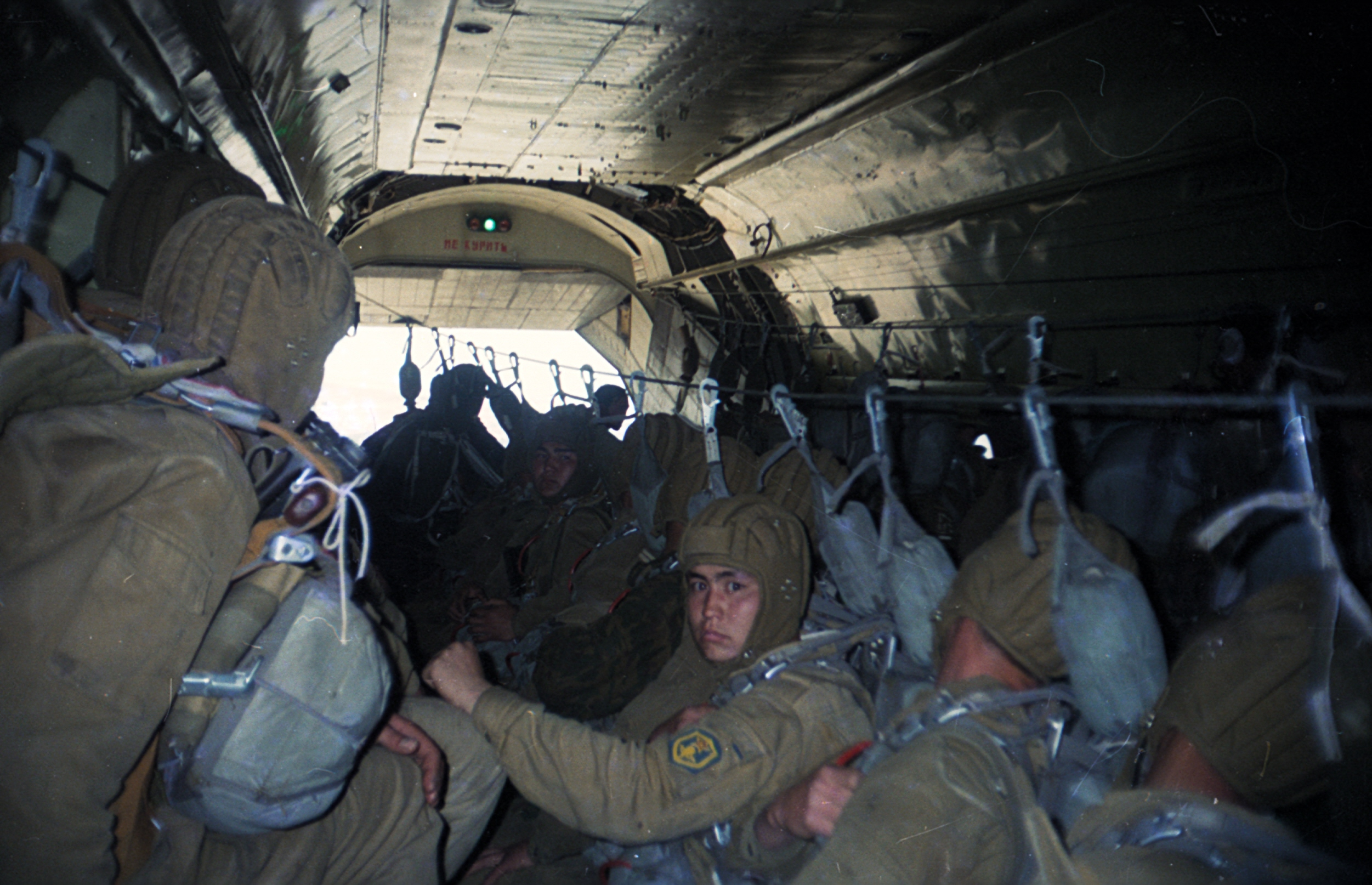
The cargo compartment of the An-12 aircraft. Servicemen of the 35th Airborne Assault Brigade of the Kazakh Armed Forces prepare for parachute landing in the sky over the city of Kapchagay, May 1996

In 1988 the VTA included six separate regiments (194th Guards Bryanskiy Red Banner Military-Transport Aviation Regiment im. N.F. Gastello at Fergana, probably associated with the 105th Guards Vienna Airborne Division, 334, 374 OVTAP at Klokovo, 566 VTAP, and unidentified regiments at Ulyanovsk and Kirovakan) and six divisions with a total of 18 military transport aviation regiments. Holm and Feskov et al. 2004 disagree on multiple regiments' identity and stationing. The divisions were the 3rd Guards Military Transport Aviation Division (VTAD) at Vitebsk (103rd Guards, 110, 235, 239th Regiments), the 6th Military Transport Aviation Division at Kryvyi Rih (Krivoy Rog) (37th, 338th Regiments), the 7th Division at Melitopol with the 25th Guards, 369th (Dzhankoy), and 708th Regiments, the 8th Division at Chkalovsky, Shchyolkovo, Moscow Oblast, (70th, 353rd, and 354th OSNAZ regiments), the 12th Military Transport Aviation Division at Migalovo, which traced its heritage to the 12th Bomber Aviation Division of the World War II period, and had three regiments, including the 8th, 81st, and a regiment at Klin. The final division was the 18th Guards 'Taganrogskaya Red Banner Orders of Suvorov and Kutuzov' Military Transport Aviation Division at Shaulyai, which traced its history to the wartime 6th Guards Bomber Aviation Division, and had three regiments (117th, 128th Guards, 196th). Regiments of the 18th VTAD, according to Holm included the 128th Guards VTAP at Panevėžys Air Base, and the 600th VTAP at Kėdainiai in the Lithuanian SSR.

The main aircraft the 61st Air Army used was the Il-76 Candid (about 220) and An-22 Cock; or the medium transport An-12 Cub. The Russian Air Force began in 2002 to upgrade its Il-76MD transport aircraft, but this is a slow process, only two aircraft being modernized in 2005. According to the modernisation programme, 12 Il-76 aircraft are due to be modernised before 2010, to the Il-76MD-90 variant.

== Structure 2007 ==
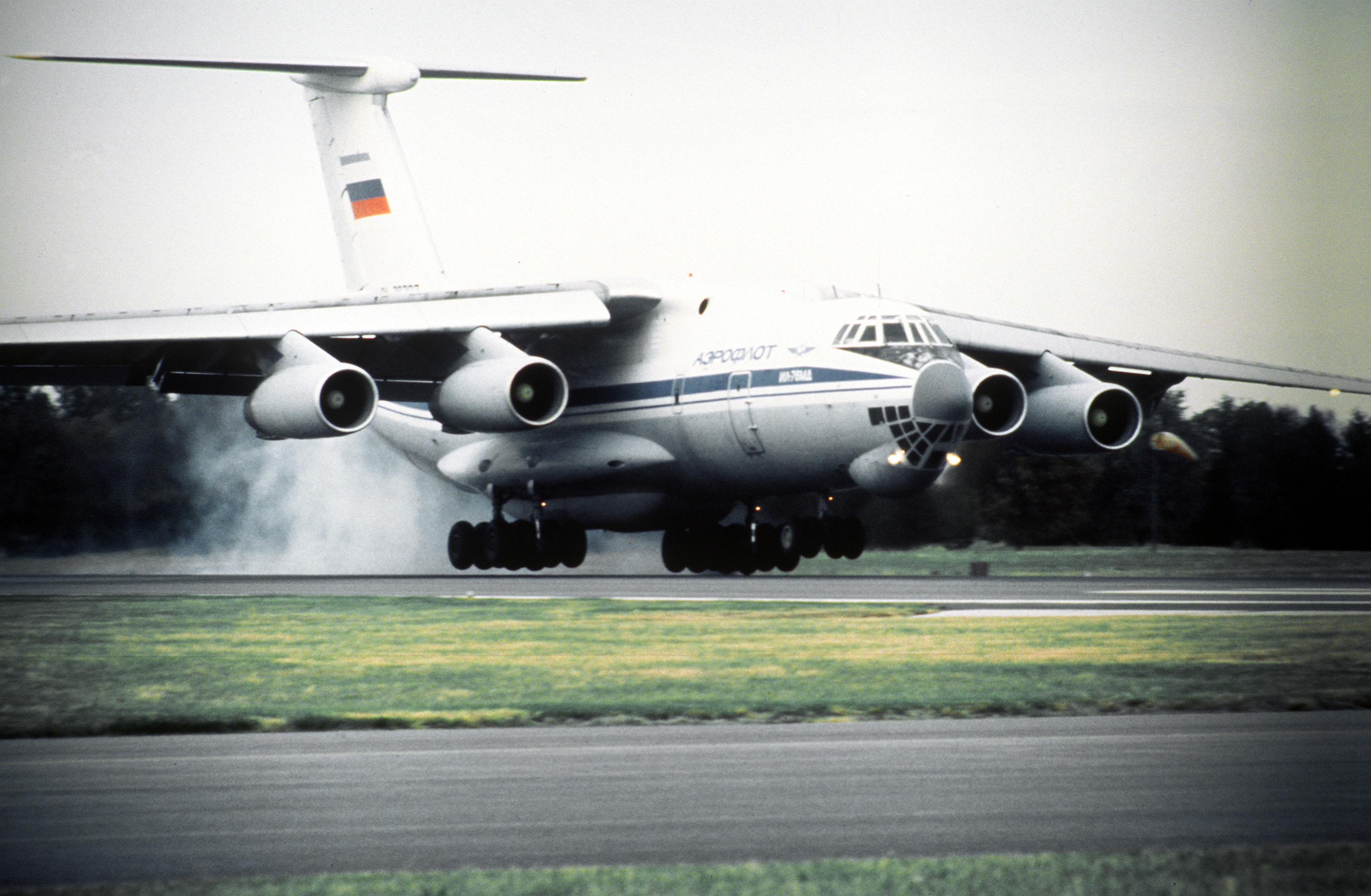
A Russian IL-76 transport from the Tver Military Transportation Air Base touches down at Scott AFB, Ill. on 24 October 1995. The Russians were participating in Peacekeeper '95, the first time that Russian troops trained on American soil.

- 61st Air Army - Moscow
  - 610th Centre for Combat and Flight Personnel Training - HQs at Ivanovo Severny, Ivanovo Oblast;
    - Unknown Instructor Military Transport Air Squadron - Ivanovo - operates the Il-76;
  - 12th Military Transport Aviation Division - Tver/Migalovo, Tver Oblast
    - 196th Military Transport Aviation Regiment - Migalovo - Il-76 in service;
    - 566th Military Transport Aviation Regiment - Seshcha, Bryansk Oblast - Il-76, An-124;
    - 76th Independent Guards Military Transport Air Squadron - Tver - An-22;
  - 103rd Military Transport Aviation Regiment - Smolensk-North - Il-76; (regiment disbanded 2009)
  - 110th Military Transport Aviation Regiment - Krechevitsy - Il-76; (regiment disbanded 2009)
  - 117th Military Transport Aviation Regiment - Orenburg, Orenburg Oblast - Il-76, An-12;
  - 334th Military Transport Aviation Regiment - Pskov-Kresty, Pskov Oblast - Il-76 (Ил-76МД, Ил-78, Ил-76МД-90А);
  - 708th Military Transport Aviation Regiment - Taganrog-Central, Rostov Oblast - Il-76;
  - 78th Independent Military Transport Air Squadron - Klin-5, Moscow Oblast - operates An-26, An-12 and Tupolev Tu-134;
  - 224th Air Detachment of Military Transport Aviation - Migalovo - An-124, Il-76MD;

== Structure ==
- 12th Mginska Krasnoznamennaya Military Transport Aircraft Division
  - 8th Military Transport Aviation Regiment - Tver/Migalovo, Tver Oblast - An-12BK, An-22, An-26 & Il-76MD
  - 144th Airborne Early Warning Aviation Regiment - Ivanovo Severny, Ivanovo Oblast - A-50/50U & Il-76MD
  - 334th Berlin Red Banner Military Transport Aviation Regiment - Pskov, Pskov Oblast - Il-76MD, MD-90A & Il-78
  - 566th Moscow Red Banner, order of Kutuzov, 1st class, Military Transport Aviation Regiment - Seshcha, Bryansk Oblast - An-124/124-100
- 18th Guards Military Transport Aviation Division
  - 117th Military Transport Aviation Regiment - Orenburg-2, Orenburg Oblast - Il-22P, Il-76MD
  - 235th Military Transport Aviation Regiment - Ulyanovsk-Vostochny - An-124 & Il-76MD/MD-90A
  - 708th Red Banner of Kerch Military Transport Aviation Regiment - Taganrog-Central, Rostov Oblast - Il-76MD

== 18th Guards Military Transport Aviation Division ==
The '18th Guards Taganrogskaya Red Banner orders of Suvorov and Kutuzov Military-Transport Aviation Division' was Military Unit no. 18380. It was activated in June 1942 from the 4th Reserve Air Group, as the 270th Bomber Aviation Division. On 23.10.43 it was renamed 6th Guards Bomber Aviation Division. At the end of the Second World War it was serving with the 1st Air Army.

Organisation May 1945:

- 134th Guards Bomber Aviation Regiment (Chernyakhovsk, Kaliningrad Oblast) with Pe-2
- 135th Guards Bomber Aviation Regiment (Chernyakhovsk, Kaliningrad Oblast) with Pe-2
- 10th Guards Bomber Aviation Regiment (Chernyakhovsk, Kaliningrad Oblast) with Pe-2

Organisation 1955:

- 4th Guards Bomber Aviation Regiment (Chernyakhovsk, Kaliningrad Oblast) with Il-28
- 128th Guards Bomber Aviation Regiment (Panevezhis, Lithuanian SSR) with Il-28
- 800th Bomber Aviation Regiment (Siauliai, Lithuanian SSSR) with Il-28

On 10 July 1964 it was renamed 11th Guards Military-Transport Aviation Division. In April 1966 finally it was renamed 18th Guards Military-Transport Aviation Division.

== See also ==
- ru:Командование военно-транспортной авиации
- ru:339-й военно-транспортный авиационный полк (339th Military Transport Aviation Regiment)
- Piotr Butowsky. Force Report:Russian Air Force, Air Forces Monthly, July 2007.
