= 12th Military Transport Aviation Division =

12th Long Range Aviation Division (May 1943 – 26 Dec 1944) 12th Bomber Aviation Division (26 Dec 1944 – 27 Apr 1946) 12th Transport Aviation Division (27 Apr 1946 – 12 Oct 1955) 12th Military Transport Aviation Division (12 Oct 1955 – 2009); (2015 – present)
- Active: 1943–2009; 2015–present
- Country: Soviet Union (1943–1991); Russia (1992–2009, 2015–present)
- Branch: Soviet Air Force (1943–1991); Russian Air Force (1992–2009); Russian Aerospace Forces (2015–present)
- Type: Bomber (former), Transport
- Size: Aviation division
- Garrison/HQ: Migalovo
- Engagements: World War II; Operation Kutuzov; Second Battle of Smolensk; Leningrad-Novgorod Offensive; Operation Bagration; Riga Offensive; Battle of Memel
- Decorations: Order of the Red Banner
- Battle honours: Mga

The 12th Mginskaya Red Banner Military Transport Aviation Division (12-я Мгинская Краснознаменная военно-транспортная авиационная дивизия) is a formation of the 61st Air Army of the Supreme Command of the Russian Aerospace Forces.

== History ==
The division was formed on 5 May 1943 as the 12th Air Division Long Range at Monino, equipped with Li-2 aircraft. On 1 August 1943 it was subordinate of the 7th Aviation Corps Long Range. It received its name for the successful accomplishment of combat missions in the battle against the Nazi invaders and the release of Mga (Mginskoye Urban Settlement), Leningrad Oblast. On 26 December 1944, it became the 12th Bomber Aviation Division.

Renamed 12th Transport Aviation Division in 1946, then 12th Military-Transport Aviation Division on 12 October 1955 and subsequently became part of Military Transport Aviation (VTA).

In 1970 the division comprised:

- 374th Military-Transport Aviation Regiment (Tula Klokovo (air base), Tula Oblast) with An-12
- 566th Military-Transport Aviation Regiment (Seshcha, Bryansk Oblast) with An-12
- 229th Military-Transport Aviation Regiment (Ivanovo, Ivanovo Oblast) with An-22
- 8th Military-Transport Aviation Regiment (Seshcha, Bryansk Oblast) with An-12

In 1998, with the rest of VTA became part of 61st Air Army, based at the Migalovo Air Base (Tver). The division used An-22, Il-76, and An-124 transport aircraft. It was disbanded in 2009 but restored in 2015.
