= Migalovo air base =

Military airport near Tver, Russia

Migalovo/Tver
- Мигалово/Тверь
- Tver, Tver Oblast in Russia
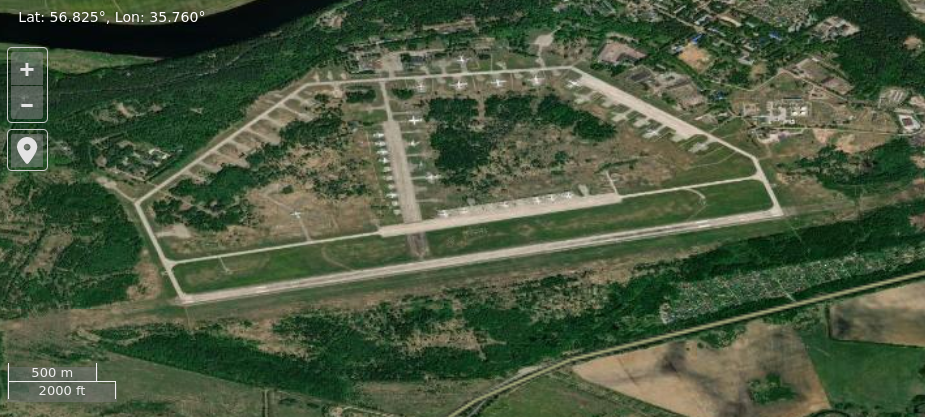
- Satellite imagery of Migalovo air base

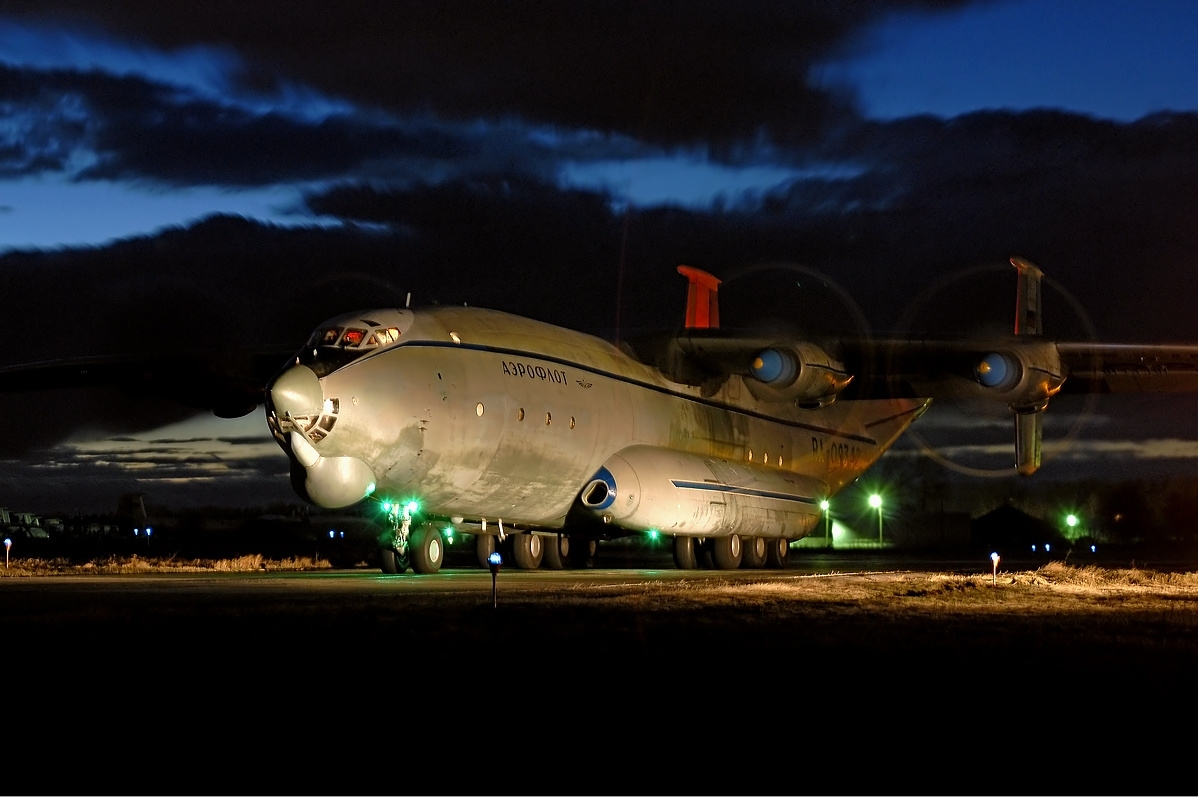
- Antonov An-22 of the Russian Air Force in Tver in april 2007 before crashing in 9 December 2025

Site information
- Type: Air Base
- Owner: Ministry of Defence
- Operator: Russian Aerospace Forces
- Controlled by: Military Transport Aviation

Location
- Shown within Tver Oblast Migalovo (Russia)
- Coordinates: 56°49′30″N 35°45′36″E

Site history
- In use: present

Airfield information
- Identifiers: IATA: KLD, ICAO: UUEM
- Elevation: 143 metres (469 ft) AMSL
Runways
Direction	Length and surface
07/25	2,500 metres (8,202 ft) Asphalt concrete

Migalovo (also given as Tver Migalovo, Kalinin) (IATA: KLD, ICAO: UUEM) is an air base in Tver Oblast, Russia located 10 km west of Tver. It is a large military airlift base. It is an Ilyushin Il-76 base, with some Antonov An-12 aircraft stored.

The base is home to the Second Central Research Institute of the Ministry of Defence of the Russian Federation (2 TSNII) and the 8th Military Transport Aviation Regiment which is part of the 12th Mginska Red Banner Military Transport Aircraft Division.

== History ==
In the period from 1946 to February 1975, the 56th Long-Range Fighter Aviation Division (56th Bomber Aviation Breslavl Division (since 1951), 56th Heavy Bomber Aviation Breslavl Division (since 1961) was based at the airfield. Its regiments included:

- 45th Heavy Bomber Regiment on Douglas A-20 Havoc, Tupolev Tu-2, Ilyushin Il-28 and Tupolev Tu-16 (ASCC "Badger") aircraft - 1946 to February 1975. In February 1975 relocated to the Kostanay airfield near Kostanay in the Kazakh SSR, where it was reorganized into the 45th Training Aviation Regiment Chelyabinsk Higher Military Aviation Red Banner School of Navigators, now the Chelyabinsk Red Banner Military Aviation Institute of Navigators;
- 173rd Heavy Bomber Regiment on Douglas A-20 Havoc, Tu-2, IL-28 and Tu-16 aircraft - disbanded together with the division at the airfield;
- 244th Bomber Aviation Regiment "Allenstein" on aircraft Boston B-3, Tupolev Tu-2, Ilyushin Il-28 and Tu-16. Fifteen crews of this regiment trained Egyptian Air Force personnel in Egypt and flew combat missions over Yemen 1962–63. In March 1965, it was relocated to the Krechevitsy Airport (near Novgorod), where it became the 244th Military Transport Aviation Regiment.

In May 1991, 730th Aviation Regiment of Fighter-Bombers from the 125th Aviation Division of Fighter-Bombers of the Western Group of Forces, was withdrawn from Neuruppin in Brandenburg to Migalovo. It was flying the Sukhoi Su-17M4 (ASCC "Fitter"). In June 1991, the regiment was disbanded at the airfield.

- Headquarters 12th Military Transport Aviation Division (from 1946, under the title 12th Transport Aviation Division)
- 8th Military Transport Aviation Regiment (8 VTAP) flying An-12 and An-22.
- 196th Military Transport Aviation Regiment (196 VTAP) flying Il-76.
- 224th Transport Aviation ~Detachment (224 LO VTA) flying Il-76 and An-124.
- 274th Fighter-Bomber Aviation Regiment (274 APIB) flying Su-17C. Arrived from Kubinka in December 1974. Disbanded 1993. Under 9th Fighter Aviation Division.
- On 25 May 2025, Ukrainian drones struck the Russian Migalovo air base, Tver Oblast. Fire and smoke was reported by the locals, the local governor denied any damage occurred and claimed all drones were intercepted.

== See also ==
- List of military airbases in Russia
