= Panevėžys Air Base =

Defunct air base in Panevėžys

Panevėžys Pajuostis Air Base
- IATA: PNV; ICAO: EYPP

Summary
- Airport type: Military
- Operator: Lithuanian Armed Forces
- Location: Panevėžys
- Opened: June 27, 1939
- Closed: 2007
- Elevation AMSL: 197 ft (60 m)
- Coordinates: 55°43′48″N 024°27′36″E

Maps
- Location of the airport in Lithuania
- Interactive map of Panevėžys Pajuostis Air Base

Runways
Direction	Length		Surface
Direction	ft	m	Surface
13/31	6,562	2,000	Concrete

Panevėžys Pajuostis Air Base (officially Pajuostis Airfield) (IATA: PNV, ICAO: EYPP) is a former air base in Lithuania located 6 km east of Panevėžys, near the village of Pajuostis.

== History ==
Initially constructed by Lithuania between 1936 and 1939, the base originally served as a reconnaissance outpost for the Lithuanian Air Force. Following the Soviet occupation of the Baltic states in 1940, the facility was expanded into a strategic hub for the Soviet Air Force. During the Cold War, it served as the home base for the 128th Guards Military Aviation Transport Regiment (128 Gv VTAP), operating heavy transport aircraft like the Antonov An-22 and the Ilyushin Il-76M. The 128 Gv VTAP relocated in 1992 to Orenburg.

Following the withdrawal of Soviet forces in 1993, the site was handed over to the restored Lithuanian Armed Forces and operated as the Lithuanian Air Force Second Air Base from 1993 to 2007, primarily hosting transport aircraft and helicopter squadrons. Active flight operations were ceased at the airfield by the Lithuanian Armed Forces in 2007.

== Incidents and accidents ==
On February 1 1990, a Soviet Air Forces Ilyushin Il-76M (registration CCCP-86021) crashed while executing local go-around training maneuvers after 14 minutes of flight. The Il-76M went into a nose dive, descending at a rate of 7,800 ft per minute. It smashed into a forest near the village of Liūdynė at 275kts. All 8 crew members died, and this stands as one of the largest Lithuanian aviation disasters.
