= Chebenki (air base) =

Air base in Orenburg Oblast, Russia

Chebenki
- Orenburg, Orenburg Oblast in Russia
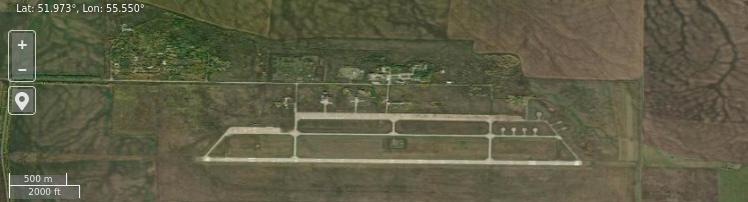
- Satellite imagery of Chebenki air base

Site information
- Type: Air Base
- Owner: Ministry of Defence
- Operator: Russian Air Force

Location
- Shown within Orenburg Oblast Chebenki (Russia)
- Coordinates: 51°58′24″N 55°33′0″E

Site history
- In use: -present

Airfield information
- Identifiers: ICAO: UWOI
- Elevation: 122 metres (400 ft) AMSL
Runways
| Direction | Length and surface |
|---|---|
| 08/26 | 2,500 metres (8,202 ft) Concrete |

Chebenki (also given as Cheben'ki, Orenburg Northeast, and Dmitrievka) is an air base in Russia located 38 km northeast of Orenburg. It has revetted areas for 15 fighters, 8 large aircraft, and considerable tarmac space.

The base was served by 118 OVE (118th Independent Helicopter Squadron) flying Mil Mi-8 and Mil Mi-24 helicopters between 1972 and 2007. Possibly part of the Volga or Volga-Urals Military District, its primary task was to search for and retrieve returning space objects. The base has had an Sukhoi Su-17 and Mikoyan-Gurevich MiG-23 attack aircraft presence during the Cold War.

From 1993 to 2007, the 4215th Aircraft Reserve Base was located here. It received Su-17, Su-24, MiG-23, and MiG-27 aircraft that during the Cold War were on combat duty at other airfields of the USSR and Eastern European countries. They were mothballed here. On April 12, 2007, the last flying Su-17UM3 flew from the Chebenki airfield to the Chkalovsky airfield.

On December 1, 2007, the aircraft reserve base was reorganized into an aviation base; it also includes the 118th Independent Helicopter Squadron.

== See also ==
- List of military airbases in Russia
