= Klin Air Base =

Klin
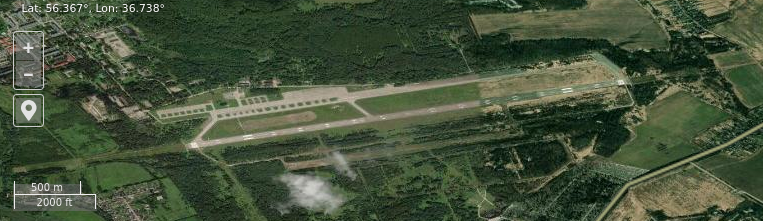
- Satellite imagery of Klin air base
- IATA: none; ICAO: UUMN

Summary
- Airport type: Military
- Operator: Russian Aerospace Forces
- Location: Klin, Klinsky District, Moscow Oblast
- Elevation AMSL: 538 ft (164 m)
- Coordinates: 56°22′0″N 36°44′18″E
- Interactive map of Klin

Runways
Direction	Length		Surface
Direction	ft	m	Surface
06/24	6,562	2,000	Asphalt

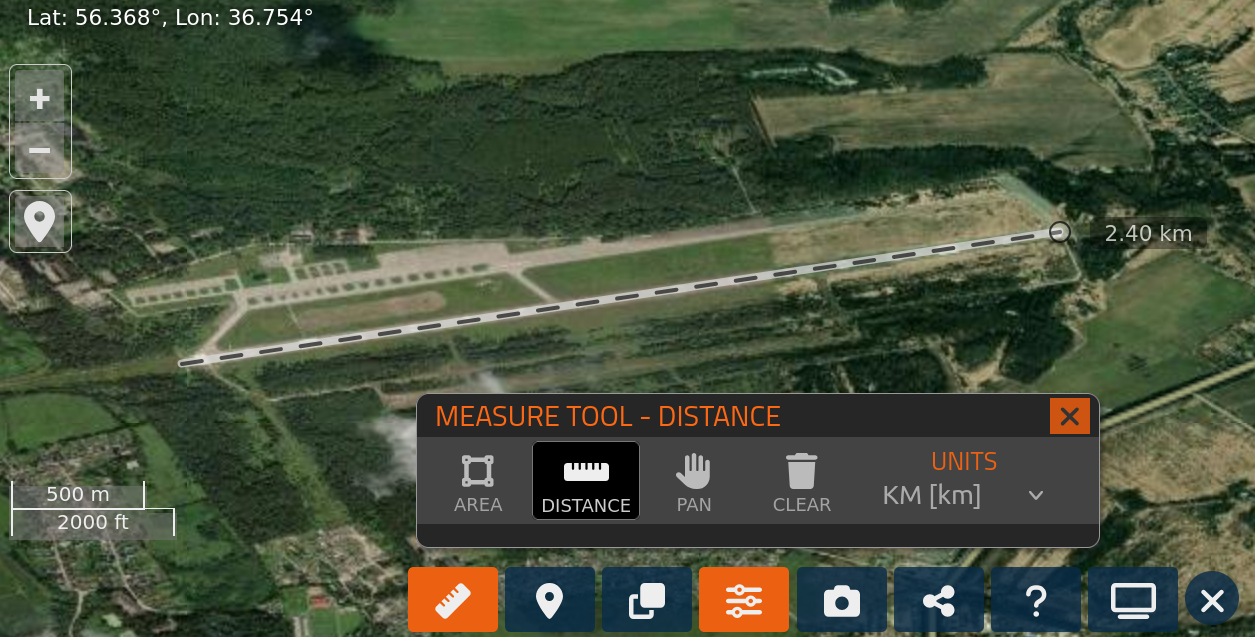
The measurement tool of NASA's FIRMS shows runway 06/24 with a length of 2.40 km

Klin is an air base in Russia located 4 km north of Klin. It is halfway between Moscow and Tver, with many military transport types (Il-76, An-12, An-26, Tupolev Tu-134, etc.) in service. The airfield was active until the 1990s. Many aircraft remains are still stored on the airfield.

During the Cold War it was an early air defence base and home to several surface-to-air missile units.

Brinkster.com lists the airfield as home to the 78th Separate Military Aviation Squadron of the 61st Air Army, the former Military Transport Aviation.

During the 1970s an unknown Interceptor Aviation Regiment (IAP) was stationed at Klin flying Su-15TM and MiG-23M aircraft. This regiment was disbanded in 1979.

In November 2024 Ukraine's Main Directorate of Intelligence claimed responsibility for a Mi-24 being destroyed by fire at the air base, in response to the Russian invasion of Ukraine. The helicopter reportedly belonged to the 92nd squadron of the 344th center of combat application and retraining of the air force of the army aviation of Russia.

== See also ==
- List of military airbases in Russia
