= 4th Air and Air Defence Forces Command =

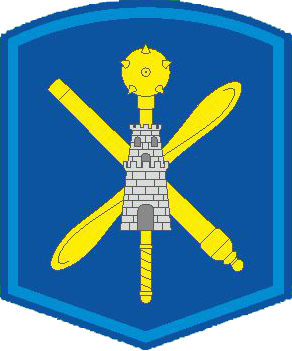
- 4th Air Force and Air Defence Command emblem (Russia)
- Active: 1 December 2009 – 1 August 2015
- Country: Russia
- Branch: Russian Air Forces
- Size: ~ 10–15 air bases
- Garrison/HQ: Rostov on Don, Southern Military District

The 4th Air and Air Defence Forces Command was a formation of the Russian Air Force. It was formed on 1 December 2009 from the amalgamation of the 4th Air and Air Defence Forces Army and 5th Air and Air Defence Forces Army. The command's headquarters was in Rostov-on-Don, and it was responsible for the air defence of the North Caucasus Military District and the Volga-Urals Military District. The command became the 4th Air and Air Defence Forces Army again on 1 August 2015.

== Structure ==
It comprised the 7th Brigade of Missile-Space Defence, in the North Caucasus Military District, and the 8th Military Space Defence Brigade in the Volga-Urals Military District. The 7th Brigade of Missile-Space Defence was formed from the 51st Air Defence Corps.

Combat Aircraft contradicted themselves between their text and a table regarding the 4th A&AD Command in their June 2010 issue. The text following the above data, drawn from warfare.ru, with the table saying that forces in the Volga-Ural Military District would come under the 3rd Air and Air Defence Force Command in the Siberian Military District.

The 7th Brigade of Missile-Space Defence was the former 51st Air Defence Corps. In 2000, it had 7,500 personnel, of which 2,500 were air crew. It also had 164 aircraft (59 Su-27, 105 MiG-29). In December 2007, it received upgraded 3D radars.

- 7th Brigade of Missile-Space Defence - Rostov, North Caucasus Military District (NCMD).
  - 6969th Airbase (Millerovo). Ex 19th and 31st Fighter Aviation Regiments. 2000: 570 pers., 51 MiG-29. 03.2007 lost two Mig-29 during manoeuvres. Pilots ejected and survived. 01.2008 named as best regiment in the 4th Air and Air Defence Forces Command. 2008 commander: Colonel Vyacheslav Kudinov. 2009: cutting staff, combining with 31st Fighter Aviation Regiment? 2009: 36 Mig-29, 6 MiG-29UB.
  - 6970th Airbase (Morozovsk, NCMD) ex 559 + 722 + 1st Bomber Regiments. 710 pers., 30 Su-24. 1994-1996 21 ac took part in Second Chechen War. 2008 commander: lt col Sergey Goncharov. 2009: 24 Su-24, 30 Su-24m. 19.06.2009 lost Su-27 during landing due to malfunction of the management system, pilots ejected.
  - 6971st Airbase Budennovsk, NCMD. Ex 368th and 461st Assault Aviation Regiments. 2000: 610 personnel, 33? Su-25, Su-24MR? 1994-1996 37 Su-25, 7 Su-24MR took part in Chechen war. 2007: 6 Su-25SM is planned to be delivered from Lipetsk. 08.2007 comd.staff exercises jointly with NC. 2008 commander: col Evgeny Fegotov. 08.2008 took part in war in South Ossetia.
  - 6972nd Airbase (Krymsk, near Krasnodar) NCMD. Ex 3 Fighter + 55 Helicopter Regts. 2000: 710 pers., 30 Su-27. ex- 562 Ftr Regt (2000). 08.2007 comd.staff exercises jointly with NC. 2009: repairs of airfield, aircraft to Zernograd? 2009: 36 Su-27, 6 Su-27UB, 20 Mi-24, 16 Mi-8, 4 Ka-27, 3 Mi-28.
  - 6973rd AIRBASE Primorsko-Akhtarsk NC ex 960 + 461 attack rgts. 2000: 620 pers., 31 Su-25, MiG-29? 1994-1996 21 Mig-29 took part in Chechen war.
  - 1537 Anti-Aircraft Rocket Regiment (Novorossyysk, NCMD) 2008 commander: col Vladimir Timofeev. 2009: 2 S-300PM
  - 1536 Anti-Aircraft Rocket Regiment (Rostov, NCMD) Formed 1940. 04.2009 msl launches at Ashuluk. 2009 commander: col Andrei Mineichev. 2009: 3 S-300PM
  - 1721st Anti-Aircraft Rocket Regiment (Sochi, NCMD) Ex 102nd Anti-Aircraft Rocket Brigade. 2000: 680 pers., Buk, 1 RKhM-4. 2009: 2 Buk
  - 6970 AIRBASE (Marinovka, NCMD) Ex 11 separate recce rgt. Su-24MR. 1994-1996 18 ac took part in Chechen war. 2005: probably to be disbanded. 2009: 24 Su-24mr
  - 6974 AIRBASE Egorlykskaya (Rostov) NC ex 325 separate hel rgt. 2000: 656 pers., 26 Mi-8, 4 Mi-6, 10 Mi-26. 2009: 10 Mi-26, 16 Mi-8
  - 326th Separate Helicopter Squadron (Bataysk NC) 246 pers., 6 Mi-8
  - 100th Radio-Technical Brigade (Astrakhan' NC) 2008 commander: col Vladimir Sletin
  - 42nd Separate Communications Regiment (Rostov NC)
  - 3624th Airbase (Erebuni, Armenia) 2009: 18 Mikoyan MiG-29
  - 32 RT RGT Volgograd NC 2008 commander: col Alexey Zaitsev.
  - 7 RT BDE? Rostov NC 2008 commander: col Vladislav Karelin.
- 8 Military Space Defence Brigade - (4 CMD AF&AD) Ekaterinburg VU ex 5A. 2009: disbanding, transferring to VKO.
  - 6977 AIRBASE Bolshoye Savino Airport, near Perm VU Ex 764th Fighter Aviation Regiment. 2000: 750 pers., 34 Mig-31. 02.2007 comd trainings. 2009: 24 Mig-31. 18.01.2010 Mig-31 emergency landing due to oxygen system damage in flight.
  - 30 AIRBASE Koltsovo, Yekaterinburg (VU) ex ?128 separate sqdn. 2009: 3 Tu-134, 2 An-12, 8 An-26, 5 Mi-8, 3+1 Su-27?
  - 6975 AIRBASE Bobrovka (Samara) VU ex 237 separate hel sqdn. 2009: 16 Mi-8, 12 Mi-24, 6 Mi-26
  - ? AIRBASE Troitsk (Chelyabinsk) VU rescue, ex-320 hel rgt.
  - 4215 AIRBASE Uprun VU 2009- 2 An-12, 2 An-24
  - 6956 AIRBASE Cheben'ki VU 2009- 12 Mi-8
  - 511 AD RGT Engels-2 VU 2009: 2 S-300PS
  - 185 AD RGT Ekaterinburg VU 2009: 2 S-300PS
  - 568 AD RGT Samara VU 2008 commander: col Yury Kostyankin. 2009: 2 S-300PS
  - 44 RT RGT Mirnyy (Samara) VU
  - 51 RT RGT Chelyabinsk
- Units directly under command headquarters
  - 229th Transport Aviation Base (Rostov-na-Donu) (ex 535th Separate Composite Aviation Regiment? Rostov, NC An-12, Mi-8)
  - 999th Airbase (Kant, Kyrgyzstan) 250 pers., 5 Su-25, 2 An-26, 5 L-39, 2 Mi-8, 2 Il-76, An-30. 08.2004 took part in Rubezh-2004 exercises. 11.2005, 05.2006 visited by AF Commander-in-Chief V.Mikhailov. 06.2007 inspected by Commander-in-Chief of the Russian Air Force. 10.2008 anniversary. 2008 commander col Vladimir Nosov. Gorenburg lists the 999th Aviation Base (Kant, Kyrgyzstan) (Su-25, Su-27, Mi-8)

Russian military reform blog:

1. 7th Air and Space Defence Brigade (Rostov-na-Donu)
2. 8th Air and Space Defence Brigade (Yekaterinburg)
3. 6970th Aviation Base (Morozovsk, Rostov Oblast) (Su-34)
4. 6971st Aviation Base (Budennovsk, Stavropol Krai) (Su-25SM, Mi-8, Mi-24, Mi-28)
5. 6972nd Aviation Base (Krymsk, Krasnodar Krai) (Su-27, Mi-8, Mi-24, Mi-28, Ka-27, Ka-52)
6. 6974th Aviation Base (Korenovsk, Krasnodar Krai) (Mi-8, Mi-24, Mi-28)
7. 229th Transport Aviation Base (Kant, Kyrgyzstan)
8. 999th Aviation Base (Rostov-na-Donu)
