= 4th Guards Air and Air Defence Forces Army =

4th Guards Army of Air Forces and Air Defence Forces Army (1998–2009; reformed 1 August 2015) 4th Air Army (1942–1998)
- Great emblem of the 4th Guards Air Army
- Active: 2015–present; 1968–2009; 1942–1949
- Country: Russia; Soviet Union (until 1991)
- Branch: Russian Air Force; Soviet Air Forces (until 1991)
- Size: World War II: several air divisions 2000s: ~ 10–15 air regiments
- Garrison/HQ: Rostov on Don
- Engagements: World War II; Battle of the Caucasus; Kerch–Eltigen operation; East Prussian offensive; Battle of Berlin; Russo-Georgian War; Russo-Ukrainian War; Invasion of Ukraine; Wagner Group rebellion
- Decorations: Order of the Red Banner

Commanders
- Commanding Officer: Lieutenant General Nikolai Vasilyevich Gostev

The 4th Guards Air and Air Defence Forces Army (Russian: 4-я армия ВВС и ПВО) is an air army of the Russian Aerospace Forces, part of the Southern Military District and headquartered in Rostov-on-Don.

The 4th Air Army (4 Vozdushnaya Armiya) was a Soviet Air Force formation and from 1992 to 2009 was part of the Russian Air Force. From 1998 the army was designated the 4th Air and Air Defence Forces Army. It was first established on 22 May 1942 from the Air Forces of the Soviet Southern Front, and fought on the Eastern Front until 1945. In 1949 it was redesignated the 37th Air Army. It was reformed on 4 April 1968 in Poland, and was active there with the Northern Group of Forces for over twenty years, shifting to the North Caucasus Military District in August 1992. The arrival of the Sukhoi Su-24 drastically changed its tasking in the 1980s.

It became the 4th Air and Air Defence Forces Command in 2009 but was reestablished from the command in 2015.

== Second World War ==
Upon its establishment in May 1942 it had 208 aircraft and 437 crews and consisted of:

- 216th Fighter Division or 216th Mixed Aviation Division (commander V. I. Shevchenko)
  - 88th Fighter Aviation Regiment
- 217th Fighter Aviation Division (commander D.P. Galunov)
- 229th Fighter Aviation Division (commander P.G. Stepanovich)
- 230th Assault Aviation Division (commander S.G. Get'man)
- 219th Bomber Aviation Division (commander I.T. Batygin)
- 218th Night Bomber Aviation Division (commander D.D. Popov)
- one training regiment, seven separate mixed aviation regiments, one communication squadron, one long range reconnaissance squadron

In June 1942 one more regiment was added, the 588th Light Night Bomber Regiment (commander Ye.D. Bershanskaya), that became the first women's unit in the Soviet Air Force. In February 1943 it was reorganized into 46th Guards Night Bomber Aviation Regiment and in October 1943 it became the 46th Taman Guards Night Bomber Aviation Regiment. In 1943, the Army supported the Kerch-Eltigen Operation and assisted in the battle for air superiority over the Kuban. Two regiments that formed part of the Army, the 57th GIAP and 821st IAP, flew lend-lease Supermarine Spitfires in 1943 for a period. Alexander Pokryshkin was one of its members, and one of the most successful aces of WW2, as well as having the distinction of being awarded the Hero of Soviet Union three times.

On 17 July 1943 the 216 SAD/IAD was redesignated the 9th Guards Fighter Aviation Division. It was commanded by Colonel Alexander Pokryshkin from April 1944 to May 1945.

In summer 1944 the Army covered the Separate Coastal Army during the Battle of the Crimea (1944). It was then reassigned to the 2nd Belorussian Front and participated in Operation Bagration, the East Prussian Offensive, the East Pomeranian Offensive, and the Battle of Berlin. Overall during the war it flew about 300,000 sorties. In July 1945 the army included the 8th Fighter Aviation Corps (Legnica, Poland), the 4th Assault Aviation Corps the 5th Bomber Aviation Corps, the 164th independent Guards Reconnaissance Aviation Regiment (Brzeg, Poland) with Pe-2R, and the 844th Transport Aviation Regiment (Swidnica, Poland) equipped with the Li-2.

=== Commanders ===
- 05/07/1942 – Major General of Aviation Konstantin Vershinin
- 09/08/1942 – Major General of Aviation Nikolai Naumenko
- 05/01/1943 – Lieutenant General, Colonel General of Aviation Konstantin Vershinin (until the end of the war)
- 05.1946 – 09.1948 – Lieutenant General of Aviation Vasily Vasilyevich Stepichev

== Postwar Soviet service ==
After World War II the 4th Air Army remained in Poland, and was renumbered as the 37th Air Army in 1949. The 37th Air Army was reorganized as the Air Forces of the Northern Group of Forces (VVS SGF) in 1964. On 22 February 1968, in accordance with a decree of the Presidium of the Supreme Soviet of the USSR the unit was awarded the Order of the Red Banner. On 4 April 1968 the VVS SGF was redesignated again into the 4th Air Army which had been the army's designation during the Second World War. The 4th Air Army was redesignated as the 4th Air Army of the Supreme High Command (VGK) in 1980 and became part of Long-Range Aviation. This reorganization was part of General Nikolai Ogarkov's reforms after the Sukhoi Su-24s started arriving in the army, and as a result it became an independent army with operative designation, subordinate to the HQ of Western Direction. The 24th Air Army of the South-Western Direction shared that status. Those were the only air force armies with Su-27 fighters, tasked with escorting the Su-24s.

From 1989 until the withdrawal from Poland the Army included the 164th Reconnaissance Aviation Regiment, 245th Mixed Aviation Squadron, 151 EW Regiment (Yak-28), 55th separate Sevastopol helicopter regiment (Mi-24, Mi-8), 19th Separate Signals and Automated Command and Control Systems Regiment (Legitza) and other smaller units of direct Army HQ subordination, and the 239th Fighter Baranovichskaya Red Banner Air Division, headquartered at Kluczewo and consisting of the 159th, 582nd, and 871st Fighter Regiments (Kołobrzeg-Bagicz Airfield)) and the 149th Bomber Aviation Division (HQ Szprotawa) with the 3rd, 42nd Guards, and 89th Bomber Aviation Regiments (Su-24s) as its primary combat formations. Over the border in the Kaliningrad Oblast, but still part of the Army, was the 132nd Bomber Sevastopol Red Banner Aviation Division at Chernyakhovsk.

On the withdrawal of Soviet forces from Poland, the 159th Fighter Regiment moved to Besovets air base and joined the 6th Air Army, and the 871st Fighter Regiment moved to Smolensk and eventually disbanded. The 151st EW Regiment moved back to Shchuchyn in the Belorussian SSR in August 1989 and definitely disbanded in 1992, with its aircraft being broken up at the 558th Aircraft Repair Facility at Baranovichi.

Following withdrawal from Poland from 1992 it became the aviation component of the North Caucasus Military District. On 22 August 1992, the headquarters of the 4th Red Banner Air Army (VGK) was relocated to the city of Rostov-on-Don and relieved from assignment from the VGK. Headquarters 1st Guards Bomber Aviation Division arrived from Lida in Belarus in 1993 and headquarters 16th Guards Fighter Aviation Division was moved to Millerovo from Damgarten, DDR, on 30 October 1993, and became part of 4th Air Army that day.

== 4th Air and Air Defence Forces Army ==
On 16 June 1997 the President of the Russian Federation signed the decree "About prime measures on reforming Armed forces of the Russian Federation and perfection of their structure". According to that decree, on the basis of the 4th Air Army and the 12th Independent Air Defence Corps of the Russian Air Defence Forces the 4th Army of the Air Forces and Air Defence was formed on 1 June 1998.

The 10th Bombardment Aviation Division, headquartered at Yeysk with up to 90 Su-24s in three regiments (296th BAP at Marinovka, 559th BAP and 959th BAP) was part of the army during the 1990s. At some point between January 2001 and September 2005 the division headquarters disbanded. Yeysk airfield, the previous home of a training aviation institute directing around three regiments of L-39s, was turned over to Russian Naval Aviation in September 2009.

In February 2004 regional command staff trainings took place in Kabardino-Balkaria. 02.2006 comd staff exercises jointly with the 58th Army of the North Caucasus Military District. Eight Su-25 took part in Peace Mission 2007 joint Russia-Sino exercises. The commanding officer of the 4th Air Army from February 2007 was Lieutenant General Igor Miroshnichenko. In August 2007 command and staff exercises were held. 11.2007 Caucasus-Rubezh −2007 command staff exercises. In March 2008 flight tactical training took place.

In 2009 the Army was disestablished and Russian Air Forces units in the Caucasus grouped under the 4th Air and Air Defence Forces Command.

The Army was reformed on 1 August 2015. In January 2016, Lieutenant General Viktor Sevastyanov became its commander.

=== Structure 2007 ===
- Headquarters 4th Army of Air Forces and Air Defence – Rostov on Don
  - 1st Guards Composite Aviation Division – Krasnodar
    - 559th Bomber Aviation Regiment – Morozovsk – Su-24 in service. Previously based at Finsterwalde in East Germany with the 16th Air Army;
    - 959th Bomber Aviation Regiment – Eisk Airport – operates the Su-24 and L-39C;
    - 368th Assault Aviation Regiment – Budyonnovsk – Su-25;
    - 461st Assault Aviation Regiment – Krasnodar – Su-25;
    - 960th Assault Aviation Regiment – Primorsko-Akhtarsk – Su-25;
  - 51st Air Defence Corps – Rostov on Don (disbanded and reorganised in 2009 as 7th Brigade of Missile-Space Defence)
    - 3rd Guards Fighter Aviation Regiment – Krymskaya (ex 562nd) – Su-27; (1.12.09 renamed 6972nd Guards Aviation Base)
    - 19th Fighter Aviation Regiment – Millerovo – MiG-29; (disbanded 2009 and reorganised as 6969th Aviation Base)
    - 31st Guards Fighter Aviation Regiment – Zernograd – MiG-29. Previously based at Falkenberg/Elster in East Germany with the 16th Air Army. Disbanded 2009.
    - SAM Regiments

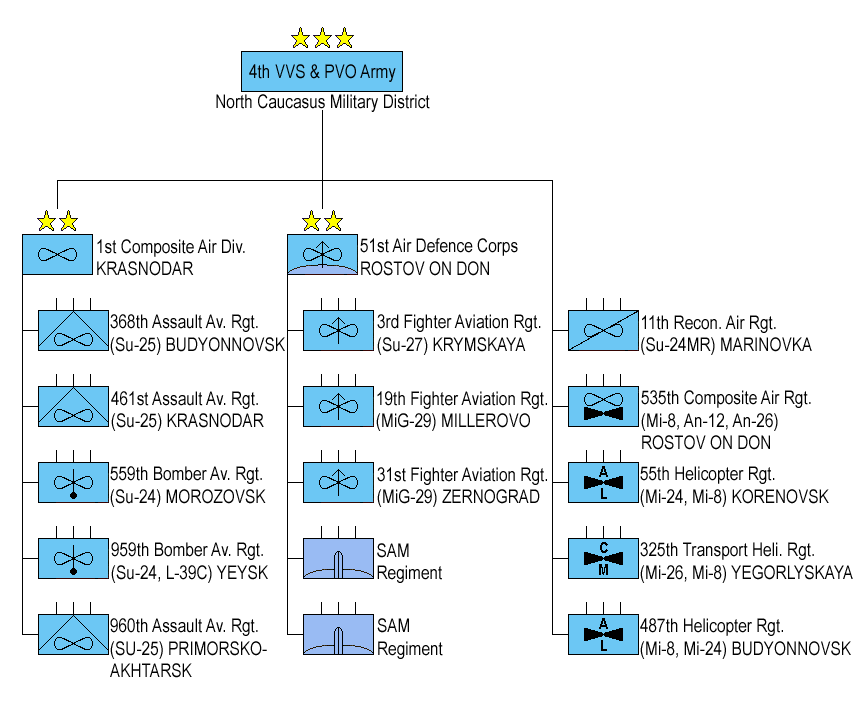
Structure 4th Air Army

  - 11th Independent Reconnaissance Aviation Regiment – Marinovka – operates the Su-24MR. Formerly based with 16th Air Army, Welzow, East Germany;
  - 535th Independent Composite Aviation Regiment – Rostov on Don – Mi-8, An-12 and An-26 in service;
  - ex Army Aviation component
    - 55th Independent Helicopter Regiment – Korenovsk – Mi-24, Mi-8;
    - 325th Independent Transport-Combat Helicopter Regiment – Yegorlyskaya – Mi-26, Mi-8;
    - 487th Independent Helicopter Regiment for battle control- Budyonnovsk – Mi-8, Mi-24;

In addition to the above forces, Russian aviation forces in Armenia, probably within the ambit of 4th Air Army, comprise 18 MiG-29 fighters of the 426th Fighter Squadron [426 Istrebitel’naya Aviatsionnaya Eskadril’ya (426 IAE)] and the 700th Air Traffic Control Center, both at the 3624th Air Base [3624 Aviatsionnaya Baza (3624 AB)] at Erebuni Airport outside Yerevan.

=== Structure 2020s ===
4th Air and Air Defence Forces Army (Rostov-on-Don) (Information updated to 2019/20 unless otherwise indicated)

- 1st Guards Composite Aviation Division (Krymsk)
  - 3rd Guards Composite Aviation Regiment (Krymsk) Two Squadrons: Su-27SM3 Flanker (as of 2019) (may have started re-equipping with Su-57 as of December 2020)
  - 31st Guards Fighter Aviation Regiment (Millerovo) Two Squadrons: Su-30SM (as of 2019)
  - 559th Bomber Aviation Regiment (Morozovsk) Three Squadrons: Su-34 (as of 2019)
  - 368th Assault Aviation Regiment (Budennovsk) Two Squadrons: Su-25SM/SM3 (as of 2019; reported upgrading to SM3 variant as of 2021)
- 4th Composite Aviation Division (Marinovka)
  - 11th Composite Aviation Regiment (Marinovka) Two Squadrons: Su-24M/M2/MR (as of 2019)
  - 960th Assault Aviation Regiment (Primorsko-Akhtarsk) Two Squadrons: Su-25SM/SM3 (as of 2019)
- 27th Composite Aviation Division (Sevastopol-Belbek)
  - 37th Composite Aviation Regiment (Gvardeyskoye) One Squadron: Su-24M/SVP-24/MR; One Squadron: Su-25SM (as of 2019)
  - 38th Guards Fighter Aviation Regiment (Sevastopol-Belbek) Two Squadrons: Su-27P/SM (as of 2019; may re-equip with Su-57 in due course)
  - 39th Helicopter Aviation Regiment (Dzhankoi)
- Directly subordinated to 4th army headquarters
  - 535th Independent Composite Aviation Regiment (Rostov-on-Don North with two mixed transport squadrons with An-26RT, An-12BK, Tu-134, L-410UVP-E20)
  - 3624th Air Base (Erebuni, Armenia) with one fighter and one mixed helicopter squadron with MiG-29, MiG-29UB, Mi-24P, Mi-8MTV, Mi-8SMV-2; MiG-29 reported to be replaced by Su-30 in 2020/21)
- Army Aviation component
  - 16th Army Aviation Brigade (Zernograd)
  - 55th Independent Helicopter Regiment (Korenovsk)
  - 487th Independent Helicopter Regiment (Budennovsk)

Air defense and support units of the 4th Air and Air Defence Army:

- 51st Air Defence Division (Rostov-on-Don)
  - 1536th Anti-Aircraft Rocket Regiment (Rostov-on-Don)
  - 1537th Anti-Aircraft Rocket Regiment (Novorossiysk)
    - Two battalions: 8 S-400/8 S-300PM launchers; second battalion with 6 launchers 96K6 Pantsir-S1 SAM.
  - 1721st Anti-Aircraft Rocket Regiment (Sochi): 12 S-350 launchers
  - 339th Radio-Technical Regiment (Tinaki, Astrakhan)
  - 338th Radio-Technical Regiment (Rostov-on-Don)
- 31st Air Defence Division (Sevastopol) - traces its history to the Sevastopol Brigade of the PVO being upgraded on 25 January 1957 into the 1st Air Defence Division. (Russian article at ru:31-я дивизия ПВО)
  - 12th Anti-Aircraft Rocket Regiment (Sevastopol)
  - 18th Guards Anti-Aircraft Rocket Regiment (Feodosia)
  - 3rd Radio-Technical Regiment (Lyubimovka, Sevastopol)
- 7th Military Base (Primorskoe, Abkhazia - S-400 and S-300 SAMs)
- 988th Anti-Aircraft Missile Regiment (Gyumri, Armenia - S-300V4/Buk-M1-2 SAMs)
- Support Center (Rostov-on-Don)
  - 1017th Air Defense Command Post (Rostov-on-Don)
  - 214th Headquarters Communications Center (Novocherkassk)

Additional fighter, helicopter and other fixed-wing aviation elements are deployed as part of the 2nd Guards Naval Aviation Division (2-я гвардейская морская Севастопольская авиационная дивизия имени Н.А. Токарева) of Russian Naval Aviation of the Black Sea Fleet – HQ Sevastopol. The division was seemingly reestablished in 2019-2020. Previously it had been disbanded in 1994.

== See also ==
- List of military airbases in Russia

== Notes ==
- Eastern Order of Battle (2019). "Russian Air Force - Today".
- Kommersant-Vlast, 2005
