= Yeysk Air Base =

Military airbase in Russia

Yeysk airbase Аэропорт Ейск
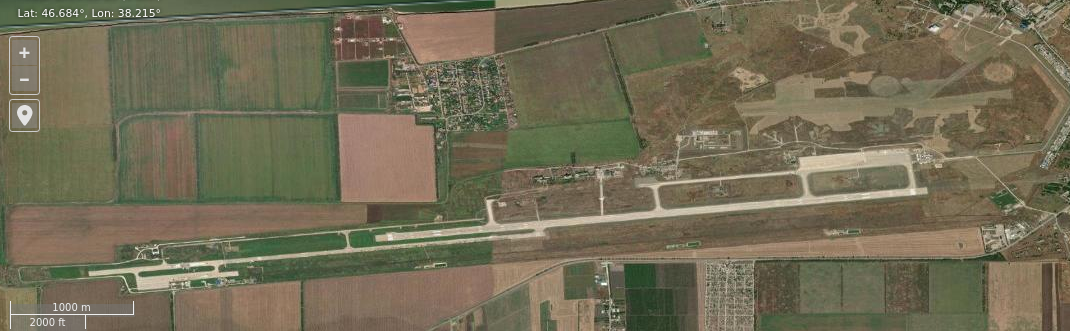
- Satellite imagery of Yeysk air base

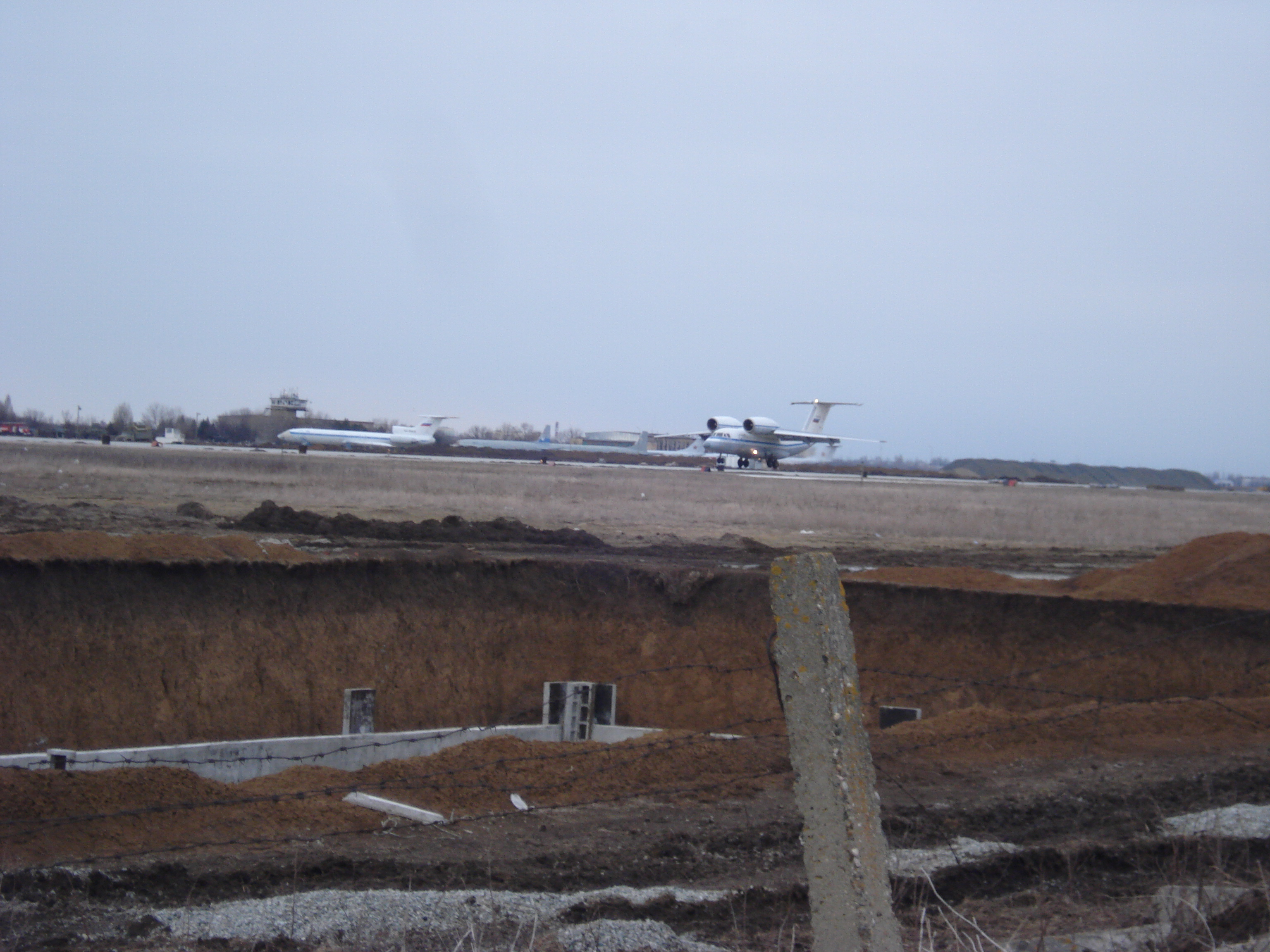
- IATA: EIK; ICAO: URKE

Summary
- Airport type: Military
- Owner: Ministry of Defence (Russia)
- Operator: Russian Aerospace Forces
- Coordinates: 46°41′0.6″N 38°12′52.2″E

Map
- Location within Krasnodar Krai

Runways
Direction	Length		Surface
Direction	ft	m	Surface
08L/26R		3,500	concrete

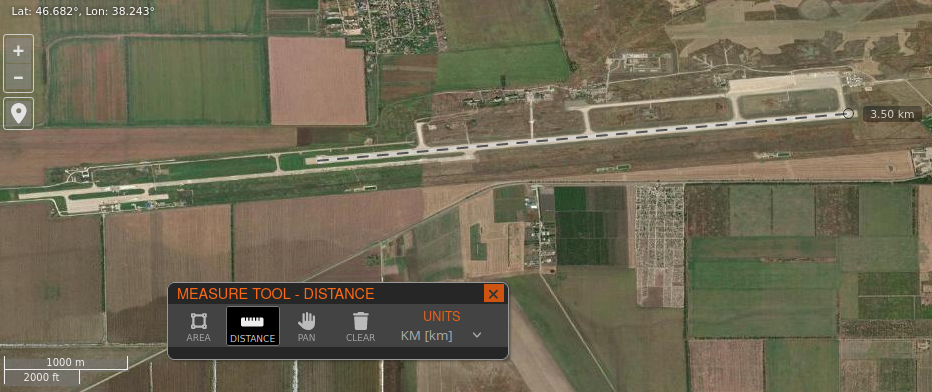
NASA's FIRMS shows runway 08/26 extended to 3.50 km

Yeysk air base, also Yeysk Airport (IATA: EIK, ICAO: URKE), is a military air base and civilian airport located near the city of Yeysk, Russia.

The base is home to the 859th Centre for Combat Application and Crew Training for Naval Aviation of Russian Naval Aviation.

As of 2024 satellite imagery shows the main runway 08/26 extended to 3.50 km.

== History ==
It was the location of the 959th Bomber Air Regiment, part of the 4th Air and Air Defence Forces Army. The regiment has now been reorganised as an aviation base, part of the new 4th Command of Air Forces and Air Defence.

Yeysk was a mixed military/civilian airfield (ru:Ейск (аэропорт)), home to the Yeysk Higher Military Order of Lenin Aviation School during the Cold War and the 10th Mixed Aviation Division (4th Air Army) during the 1990s.

After the disbandment of the 10th Mixed Aviation Division the headquarters of the 1st Guards Stalingrad, Svirsky Composite Air Division arrived. Also at the airport based aviation group Yeysk Higher Military Institute, equipped with L-39 aircraft.

In addition, the 959th Bomber Regiment was previously based at the airfield, which was part of the 1st Guards Composite Air Division. The 959th Bomber Aviation Regiment was previously the 959th Training Aviation Regiment. In September 2009, due to the transfer of the airfield from the Air Force to the Navy, the regiment was disbanded, and its members were part of the aircraft Su-24 relocated to Morozovsk airfield (6970th Air Base, 7th Brigade of Aerospace Defence).

On 1 February 2010, the 859th Naval Aviation Training Center under the leadership of Major-General Alexei Serdyuk opened at the airfield. To ensure the educational process, training units were to be relocated from the Ostrov (air base) (Pskov Oblast) and the village of Kacha. For service center from the previously disbanded and civilian staff will be involved in more than one thousand people.

By December 2018 the 726th Army Air Defense Training Center located next to the air base had received their first Tor-M2DT surface-to-air missile systems.

Planet Labs satellite imagery from 26 June 2023 of the air base showed decoy fighter jets painted on the hardstand in an apparent deception tactic against Ukrainian attacks. Similar painted decoys have been seen at Kirovske and Primorsko-Akhtarsk air base.

On the night of 4-5 April 2024, Ukrainian drones are reported to have attacked the airport. According to Ukrainian intelligence they destroyed two Su-25s and killed four base personnel. Russia denied these claims.

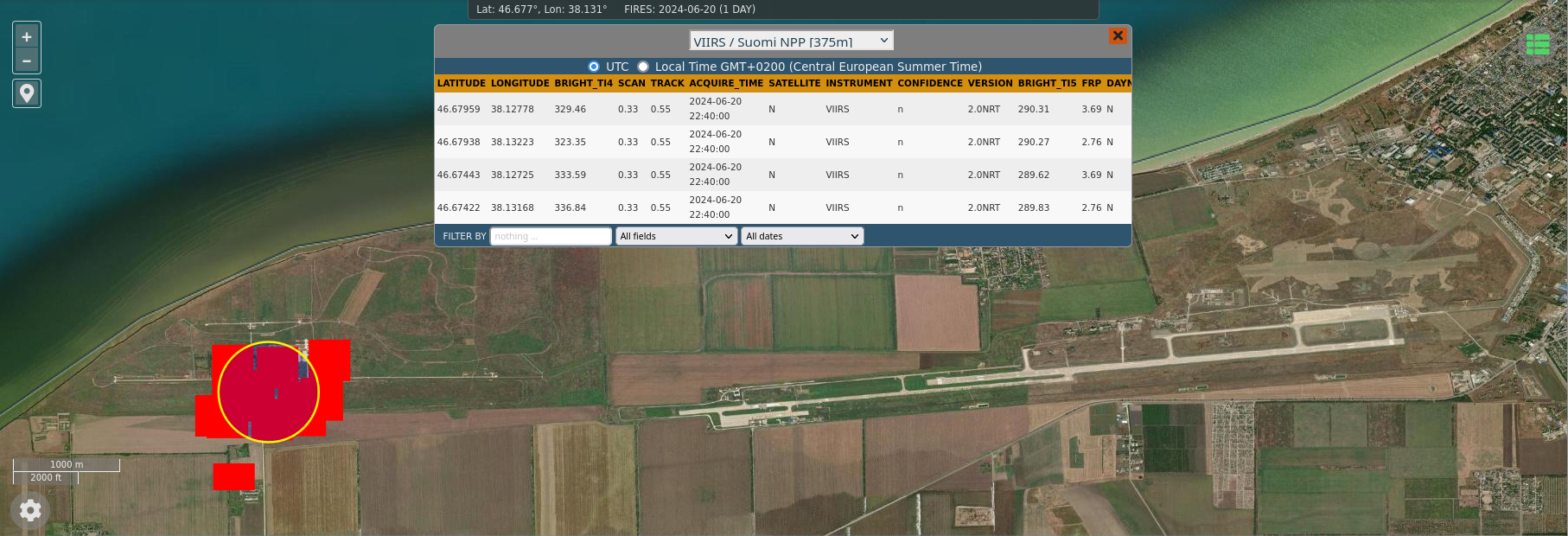
NASA's FIRMS detected fire next to the air base on 2024-06-20 22:40:00 (UTC)

On 21 June 2024, Ukrainian drones attacked the 726th Army Air Defense Training Center next to the air base causing an extensive fire detected by NASA's FIRMS. The attack reportedly destroyed facilities and personnel used for the launch of Shahed drones.

As of September 2024, the 190th Mixed Aviation Regiment was reported to be active at the base while the 859th Naval Aviation Combat Training and Retraining Center continued to be hosted there.

Waves of Ukrainian drones struck Yeysk airbase early in the morning of 29 September 2024, resulting in fires and explosions. Early reports do not clarify the battle damage, and official reports from the two militaries have not yet been released.

== Airlines and destinations ==
The Yeysk airfield has at some times been used as a civilian airport.

Airlines	Destinations
Smartavia	Moscow–Sheremetyevo

== See also ==
- List of airports in Russia
- List of military airbases in Russia
