= 1st Guards Mixed Aviation Division =

Russian Aerospace Forces division

1st Guards Mixed Aviation Division (2013–present) 6972nd Guards Air Base (2009–2013) 3rd Guards Fighter Aviation Regiment (2001–2009) 209th Guards Fighter Aviation Regiment (1992–2001) 393rd Guards Fighter Aviation Regiment (1956–1992) 725th Guards Assault Aviation Regiment (1949–1956) 59th Guards Assault Aviation Regiment (1943–1949) 688th Night Light Bomber Aviation Regiment (1941–1943)
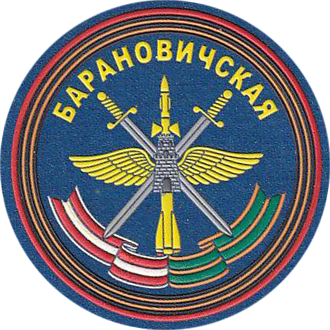
- Sleeve patch of the division
- Active: 1941–present
- Country: Soviet Union (1941–1991); Russia (1992–present)
- Branch: Soviet Air Force (1941–1991); Russian Air Force (1992–present); Russian Aerospace Forces
- Type: Mixed Aviation Division
- Part of: 4th Guards Air and Air Defence Forces Army
- Garrison/HQ: Krymsk (2001–present)
- Equipment: Su27
- Engagements: World War II; Battle of Stalingrad; Russian invasion of Ukraine
- Decorations: Order of the Red Banner; Order of Suvorov 3rd class
- Battle honours: Baranovichi

The 1st Guards Baranovichi Red Banner Order of Suvorov 3rd Class Mixed Aviation Division is an aviation division of the Russian Aerospace Forces.

The regiment was formed on 21 October 1941 from personnel of the Chelyabinsk School of Gunners and Bombardiers as the 688th Night Light Bomber Aviation Regiment. Less than a month later, just after completing training, the regiment left for the front. It fought in the Rzhev salient until January 1942, and in the summer of 1942 in the Battle of Stalingrad. For its actions at Stalingrad, the regiment became the 59th Guards Assault Aviation Regiment on 8 February 1943. On 2 September 1943 received the Order of the Red Banner. It fought in Orel-Kursk operation, Operation Bagration, and Warsaw offensive (likely Warsaw-Poznan Offensive in Jan 1945, but could also be the Lublin-Brest Offensive in summer 1944). For actions in liberating Baranovichi, it received the Baranovichi honorific 27 June 1944. It was later awarded Order of Suvorov 3rd class for actions in the Berlin Offensive on 16 April 1945.

From 1949 to 1956 the regiment was the 725th Guards Assault Aviation Regiment, flying from Altes-Lager, Dallgow, Dessau, Brandis, and Finsterwalde in Germany.

In August 1956, the regiment relocated to Astrakhan, became part of PVO, and renamed 393rd Guards Fighter Aviation Regiment. In December 1992 it became the 209th Guards Fighter Aviation Regiment, part of 12th Air Defence Corps, Russian Air Defence Forces. 12th Air Defence Corps became 51st Air Defence Corps in 1998, and soon afterwards became part of the 4th Air and Air Defence Forces Army.

On 1 September 2001 the regiment absorbed the 562nd Fighter Aviation Regiment at Krymsk and became the 3rd Guards Fighter Aviation Regiment (3rd GvIAP) with transfer of battle flag and honorifics of 209th GvIAP and moved to Krymsk. On 24 August 2009, the 3rd GvIAP and 178th Separate Helicopter-Rescue Detachment became 6972nd Guards Baranovichi Red Banner Order of Suvorov 3rd Class Air Base of the 1st Category at Krymsk. On 11 November 2013, the base was reformed into the 1st Guards Mixed Aviation Division of the Southern Military District with transfer of the 6972nd's honorifics and flag. Colonel Tagir Gadzhiyev was the division commander in 2016.

By June 2019, a regiment of the division was being considered as the first aviation unit to begin receiving serial Sukhoi Su-57 fifth-generation fighters. On 8 July 2022, the chief of staff of the division, Colonel Anatoly Stasyukevich, was killed in the Russo-Ukrainian war.
