= 1537th Anti-Aircraft Rocket Regiment =

Russian missile regiment

- Active: 1938–present
- Country: Soviet Union; Russia
- Branch: Soviet Air Force; Soviet Air Defence Forces; Russian Aerospace Forces
- Type: Surface-to-air missile
- Part of: 51st Air Defence Division
- Garrison/HQ: Novorossiysk
- Equipment: S-300, S-350,Tunguska, Pantsir
- Engagements: World War II
- Decorations: Order of the Red Banner

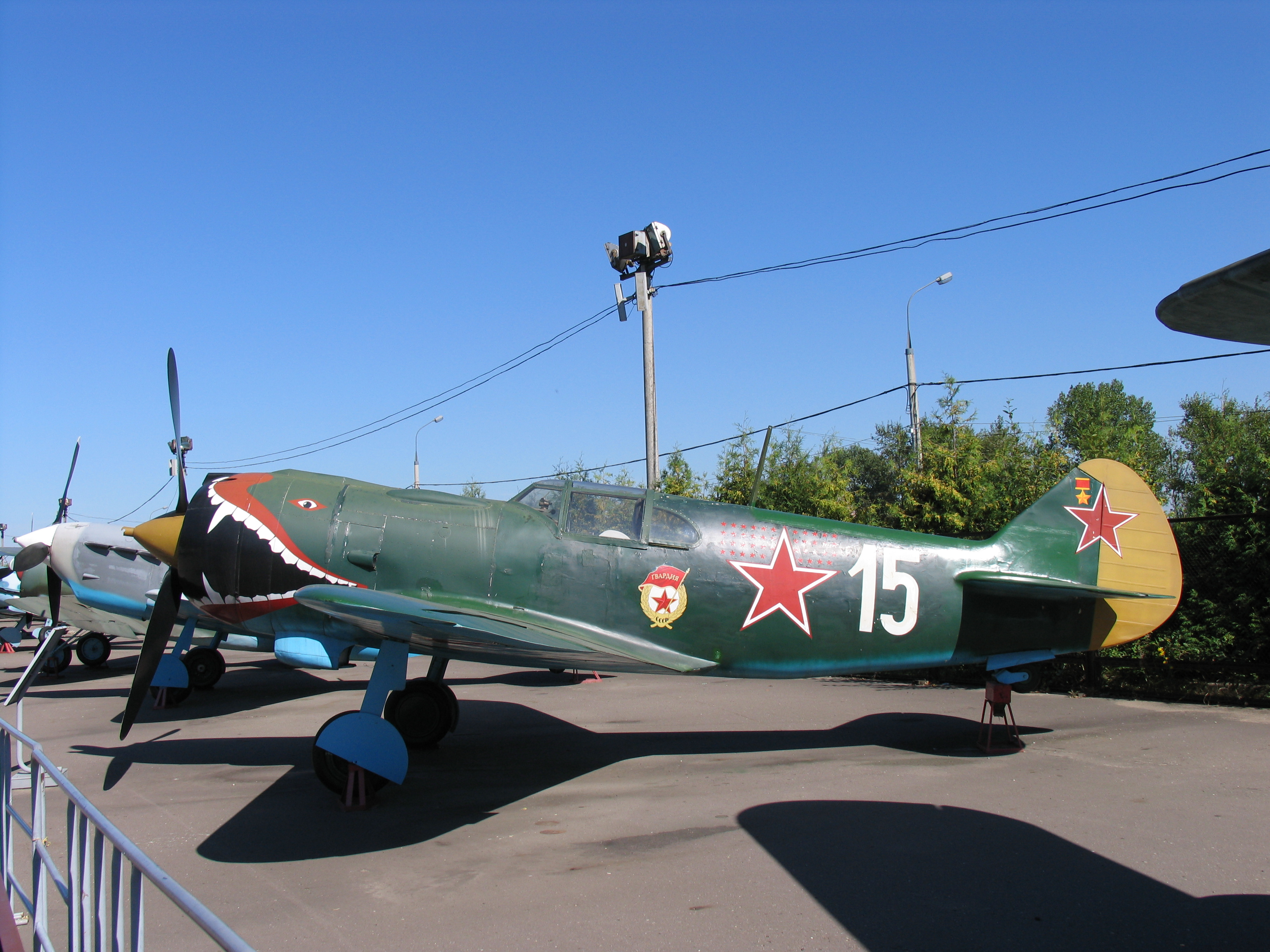
An La-5 fighter

The 1537th Anti-Aircraft Rocket Regiment is a surface to air missile regiment of the Russian Aerospace Forces. It is based in Novorossiysk as part of the 4th Air and Air Defence Forces Army. It traces its history to the 50th Red Banner Fighter Aviation Regiment (50th IAP), a military unit of the Red Army Air Force which took part in the Second World War.

== Formation and World War II ==
The 50th Fighter Aviation Regiment (IAP) was formed from August to December 1938 in the Transcaucasian Military District (ZKVO) with four squadrons: two with the Polikarpov I-16 and two with the Polikarpov I-15bis. It became part of the 60th Fighter Aviation Brigade of the Air Forces of the district, and was commanded by Major Aleksandr Makarov. In July 1940, the regiment became part of the 27th Fighter Aviation Division of the ZKVO Air Force at the Nasosnaya airfield. Two squadrons re-equipped from the I-15bis to the Polikarpov I-153 in 1940. In August 1941, the regiment was reorganized to consist of three squadrons with an authorized strength of 32 fighters and re-equipped with Mikoyan-Gurevich MiG-3 fighters.

The 50th IAP entered combat on 10 January 1942 with the 135th Fighter Aviation Division (IAD) of the Crimean Front. Its first credited aerial victory came on 1 February, a German Me 109 downed over Koy-Asan by a pair of MiGs led by Junior Lieutenant Menyak. With the Crimean Front, the regiment flew 1,255 sorties mostly providing air cover to ground troops, with the loss of eight aircraft and six pilots. After the Soviet defeat in the Battle of the Kerch Peninsula, the regiment handed over its remaining aircraft to the 25th IAP and went to the rear for replacements. The regiment reorganized to consist of two squadrons with an authorized strength of 20 fighters and re-equipped with the LaGG-3 during June and July, under the 2nd Reserve IAP at Seyma, Gorky Oblast. The regiment joined the 286th IAD of the 15th Air Army on 6 August and began combat missions with the Bryansk Front on 9 August. In 159 sorties, the regiment lost fourteen aircraft and ten pilots. On 19 August, after nine days of combat, the 50th IAP handed over its remaining three fighters to the other units of the 286th and was placed in the reserve.

The 50th IAP would not see action during the remainder of 1942, a year in which it was credited with the destruction of 30 aircraft in return for the loss of 22 in combat and three to other causes. The regiment was withdrawn to the rear for replacements on 19 November. At Morshansk under the 4th Reserve Fighter Aviation Regiment it received the Lavochkin La-5 and reorganized to consist of three squadrons with an authorized strength of 32 fighters. The regiment re-entered combat with the Bryansk Front on 18 April 1943 with the 284th IAD of the 15th Air Army. It was transferred to the 315th IAD of the air army on 5 May. Makarov, who had commanded the regiment since 1938, was replaced by Major Aleksey Vinokurov on 5 July 1943. The regiment spent the rest of the war under the command of Vinokurov with the 315th IAD and was assigned to fly aerial photographic reconnaissance missions from May 1943. The regiment was employed in the reconnaissance role for the rest of the war. During July and August it operated in support of Operation Kutuzov, then the Bryansk offensive in September. The 50th IAP supported the Soviet advance into northern Belorussia towards Vitebsk and Polotsk in October, and the continued push to the west in the February 1944 Staraya Russa–Novorzhev offensive. During mid- and late-1944, the regiment supported the 2nd Baltic Front in the breakthrough of Axis lines at Idritsa, Sebezh, Drissa, and the advance into the Baltic states in the Rezhitsa–Dvinsk and Riga offensives. The regiment was awarded the Order of the Red Banner on 2 August 1944 for its "exemplary execution of combat missions".

In October 1944, the regiment and division joined the 14th Fighter Aviation Corps (IAK), under the 15th Air Army. Together with the division and corps it ended the war operating against the Courland Pocket, supporting the Courland Group of Forces from 1 April 1945. From 1943 to 1945 the regiment flew 6,815 sorties, almost exclusively reconnaissance, with the loss of 46 aircraft and 39 pilots in combat. During the war, the 50th IAP was credited with the destruction of 58 aircraft in the air and 53 on the ground in 7,599 combat sorties.

Regimental commanders included:

- Major Aleksandr Mikhailovich Makarov (9 October 1938–June 1943)
- Major (promoted to Lieutenant Colonel) Aleksey Mikhailovich Vinokurov (5 July 1943 – 18 May 1945)
- Lieutenant Colonel Aleksandr Ivanovich Khalutin, September 1945

== Postwar ==
A practice S-400 launch from the regiment during the Kavkaz-2020 exercise

From 1946, the regiment served in Belarus with the 315th IAD, under the 14th IAK of the 1st Air Army (renumbered the 58th IAK and 26th Air Army in 1949). In July 1950, the regiment and division were transferred to the 88th Fighter Aviation Corps of the Air Defence Forces (PVO), part of the 64th Fighter Air Army. In late 1951, the division was transferred to the Air Forces of the North Caucasus Military District, moving to Maykop. The regiment and its division returned to PVO control in July 1954 with their transfer to the North Caucasus Air Defence Army.

The regiment was reorganised as a surface-to-air missile regiment with the S-75 Dvina on 15 August 1960, becoming the 360th Red Banner Anti-Aircraft Missile Regiment of the 12th Air Defence Corps and relocating to Novorossiysk. In 1968 it became the 80th Anti-Aircraft Rocket Brigade, and in 1994 the 1537th Anti-Aircraft Rocket Regiment. The 1537th Regiment continued to remain part of the corps after it was renamed the 51st Air Defence Corps in 1998 and reduced to the 7th Aerospace Defence Brigade in 2009, before being reorganized as the 51st Air Defence Division in 2014. By 2019, the regiment was re-equipped with the S-400 missile system and the Pantsir missile system.

In April 2021 personnel of the regiment took part in a parade in Krasnodar honoring the 30th anniversary of the rehabilitation of the Cossacks in the Kuban. In May 2022, personnel of Military Unit 26345 - the 1537th Regiment - laid wreaths on the new graves of Russian service personnel killed during the 2022 Russian invasion of Ukraine.

== Names of the Regiment ==
- 50th Fighter Aviation Regiment;
- 50th Red Banner Fighter Aviation Regiment;
- 50th Red Banner Air Defence Fighter Aviation Regiment;
- Field mail 25345 during World War II. (Military Unit Number 26345, since 1960).
- 80th Anti-Aircraft Rocket Brigade
- 1537th Anti-Aircraft Rocket Regiment

== Bases from 1946 ==
Its bases from 1945 onwards included:

- Tukums, Latvia, July 1945 - August 1946 [56 56 34N, 23 13 21E]
- Lida-North, Grodno Oblast, Belarus, 8.46 - 10.48 [53 55 48N, 25 16 35E]
- Kobrin, Brest Oblast, Belarus, 10.48 - 7.50 [52 14 14N, 24 20 51E]
- Kalinin, Kalinin Oblast, 7.50 - 9.51 [56 49 38N, 35 45 18E]
