= Marinovka =

Marinovka (Russian: Мариновка) is the name of several rural localities in Russia:

- Marinovka, Belgorod Oblast, a selo in Yakovlevsky District of Belgorod Oblast
- Marinovka, Kemerovo Oblast, a village in Poperechenskaya Rural Territory of Yurginsky District of Kemerovo Oblast
- Marinovka, Omsk Oblast, a village in Andreyevsky Rural Okrug of Okoneshnikovsky District of Omsk Oblast
- Marinovka, Saratov Oblast, a selo in Fyodorovsky District of Saratov Oblast
- Marinovka, Tambov Oblast, a village under the administrative jurisdiction of Sosnovsky Settlement Council, Sosnovsky District, Tambov Oblast
- Marinovka, Volgograd Oblast, a selo in Marinovsky Selsoviet of Kalachyovsky District of Volgograd Oblast
  - Marinovka Air Base, a nearby Russian Air Force base
