= 239th Fighter Aviation Division =

The 239th Fighter Aviation Division was a fighter aircraft unit of the Soviet Air Forces and the Russian Air Force, which was in existence during World War II and from 1949 to 1998.

== First formation ==
Its first formation was established on 12 June 1942 from the 6th Shock Aviation Group. With 6th Air Army from July 1942. On 1 July 1942 its first formation was part of the 6th Air Army. Fought in Battle of Demyansk (1943) and Staraya Russa Offensive. In recognition of its actions, the division was renamed the 5th Guards Fighter Aviation Division on 18 March 1943.

== Second formation ==
Its second formation traces its origins to the formation of the 323rd Fighter Aviation Division in May 1943.

In 1945 its headquarters was established at Kluczewo Airfield, Poland. In 1945 it had three regiments, all equipped with Yak-9 fighters, the 149th, 269th, and 484th Fighter Aviation Regiments.

It spent much of its service after the Second World War with the 4th Air Army in Poland.

On the withdrawal of Soviet forces from Poland, the division headquarters moved in July 1992 to Petrozavodsk in the Karelian ASSR, becoming part of the 76th Air Army. The 159th Fighter Aviation Regiment moved to Petrozavodsk Airport (Besovets) and joined the 6th Air Army, and the 582nd and 871st Fighter Aviation Regiments moved to Smolensk and eventually disbanded.

The division was disbanded on 1 May 1998.
