= Church of the Life-Giving Trinity (Bataysk) =

- Церковь Троицы Живоначальной
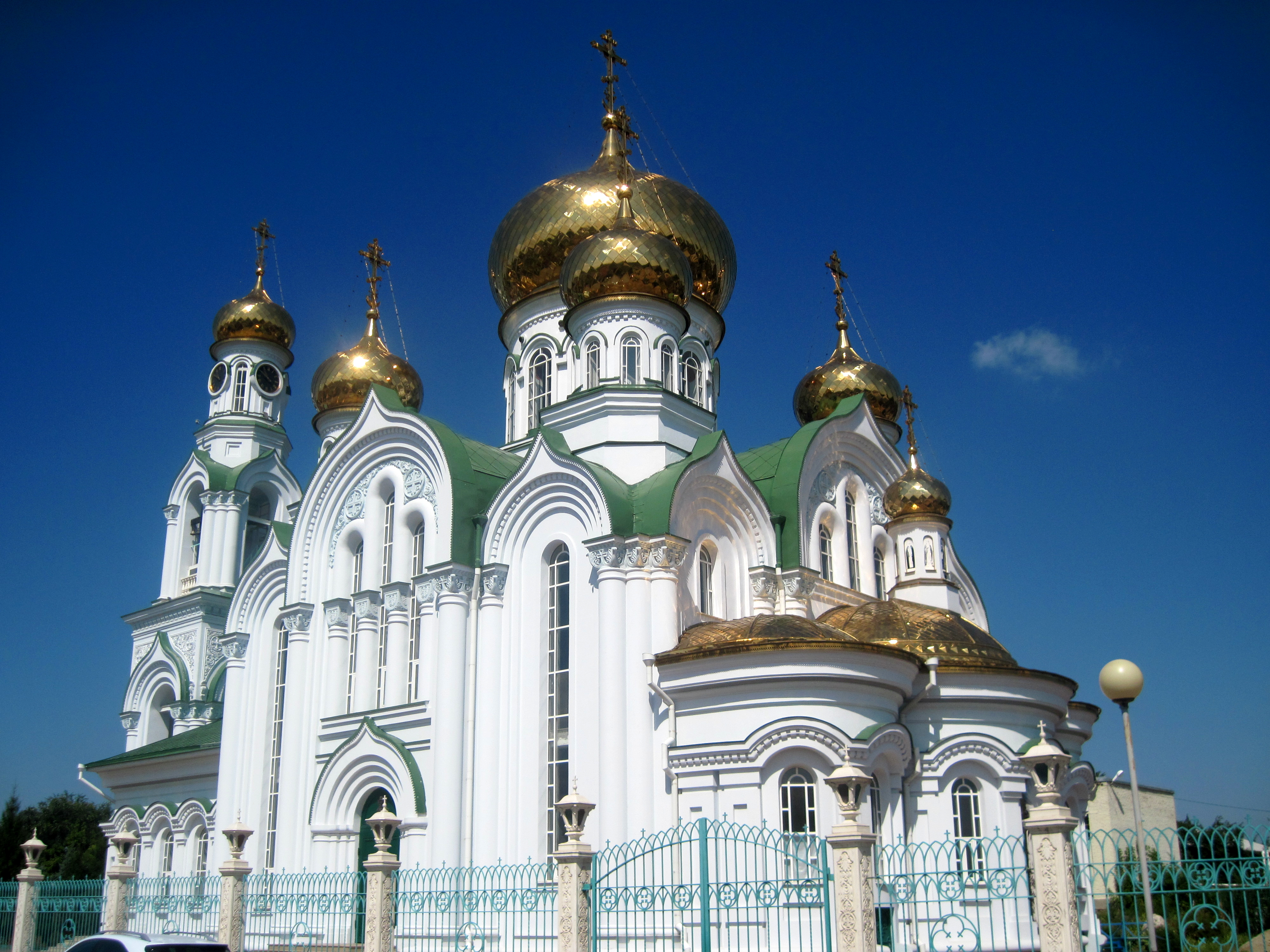
- The church in 2016
- Church of the Life-Giving Trinity
- 47.0851°N 39.4413°E
- Location: Bataysk, Rostov Oblast
- Country: Russia
- Denomination: Eastern Orthodox

History
- Status: Parish church
- Dedication: Holy Trinity

Architecture
- Functional status: Active
- Architectural type: Russian church architecture
- Completed: 2013

Administration
- Division: Patriarchate of Moscow and All Russia

The Church of the Life-Giving Trinity (Russian: Церковь Троицы Живоначальной or Свято-Троицкая церковь, Троицкий храм) is a Russian Orthodox church in Bataysk, Rostov Oblast, Russia. It was built in 2013 in Russian church architecture style.

== History ==
In 1854, a five-domed Odigitrievsky Church was built in Bataysk, with the height that is comparable to those of the modern Rostov Cathedral. On the church yard there were two schools, an almshouse, and a refectory. In 1937 this church was destroyed. In the pre-war years, the remains of the church building served as a prison. During the Great Patriotic War, when Bataysk was occupied by Nazi forces, a camp for prisoners of war that was surrounded by barbed wire was established at the site of the destroyed church.

After the war, a lyceum was built on the foundation of the church, and in the late 1980s, when the Perestroika began in the USSR, town residents decided to build a new church on the former church territory. Residents of Bataysk appealed to the town authorities with a request to hand them over the cinema theatre building to open an Orthodox church in it. The request was approved. In 1991 the church's revival began, and it was named in honour of the Holy Trinity. One of its altars received the name "Odigitrievsky".

Construction of the Holy Trinity Church began in September 2000. In 2003, two domes with crosses and a tower clock on the bell tower were installed. On the square, in front of the church, there was also constructed a monument to St. Andrew the First-Called, the opening and consecration of which were held on September 27, 2003. The author of the monument is the Honoured Artist of the Russian Federation, sculptor S. M. Isakov.

In 2006, the construction of a new building for the church school began. In 2008, walls and arches were plastered, and fence was arranged. In 2009, finishing works inside were carried out.

The Trinity Church was completed in 2013 and became a major landmark of Bataysk. At the architectural competition-show "Prometheus-2007" which was held in Stavropol, the church was recognized as the most beautiful religious building of Southern Russia.

Gallery

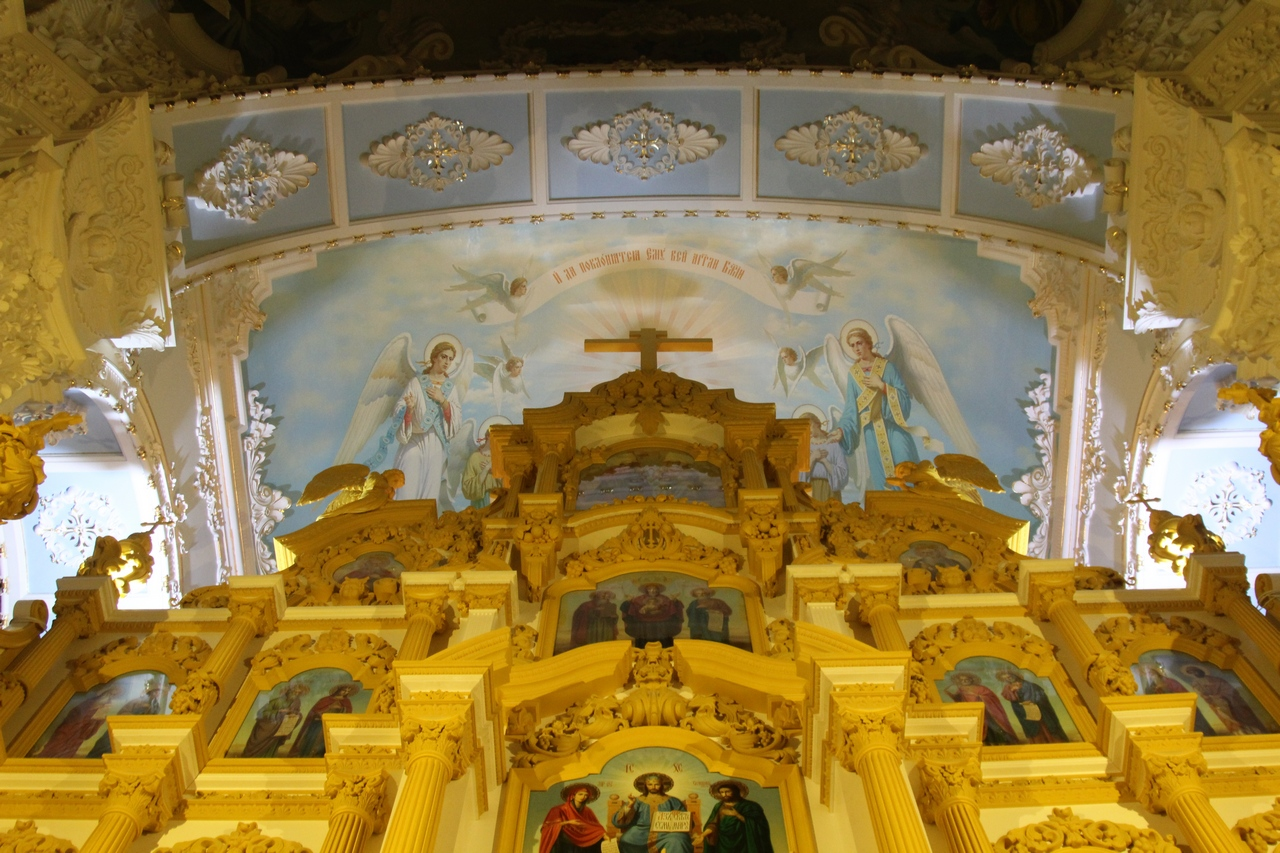
Iconostasis

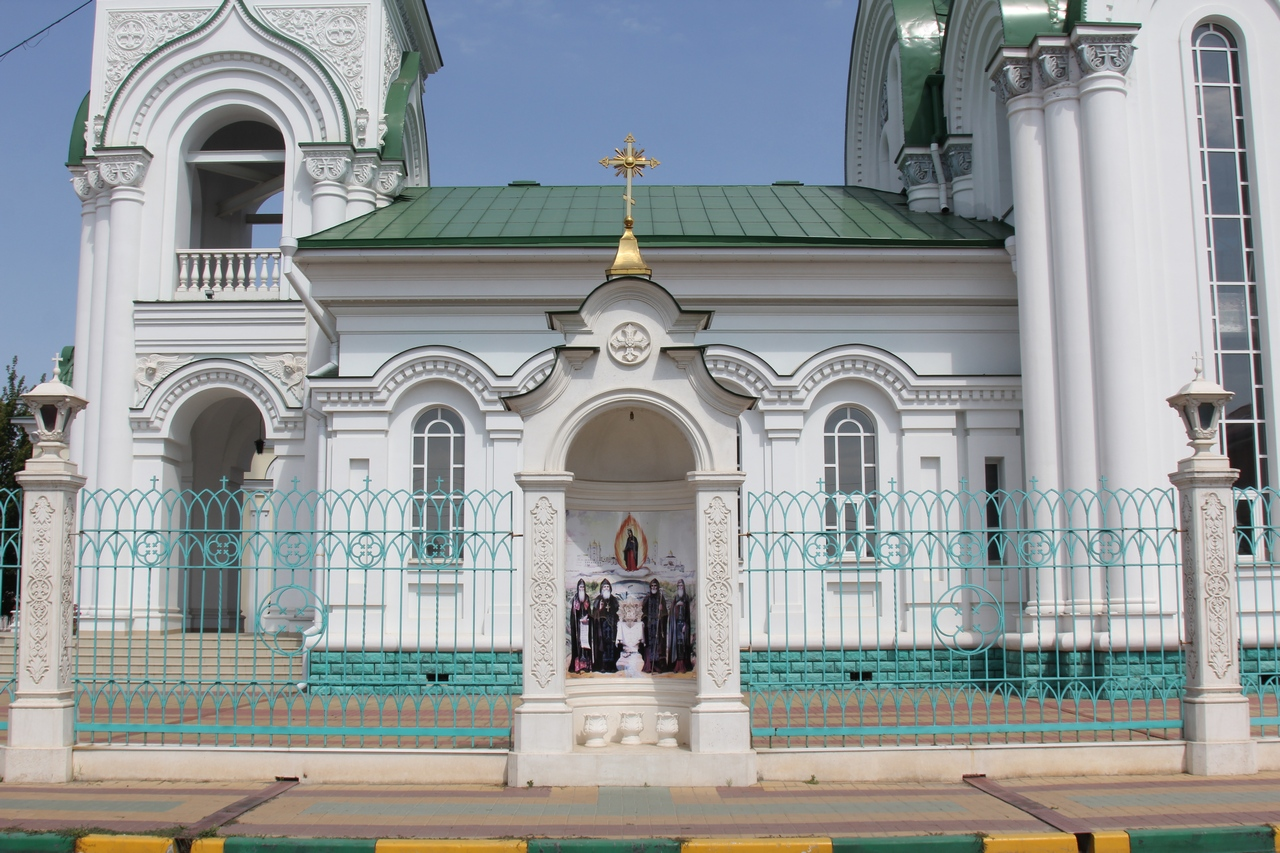
Chapel

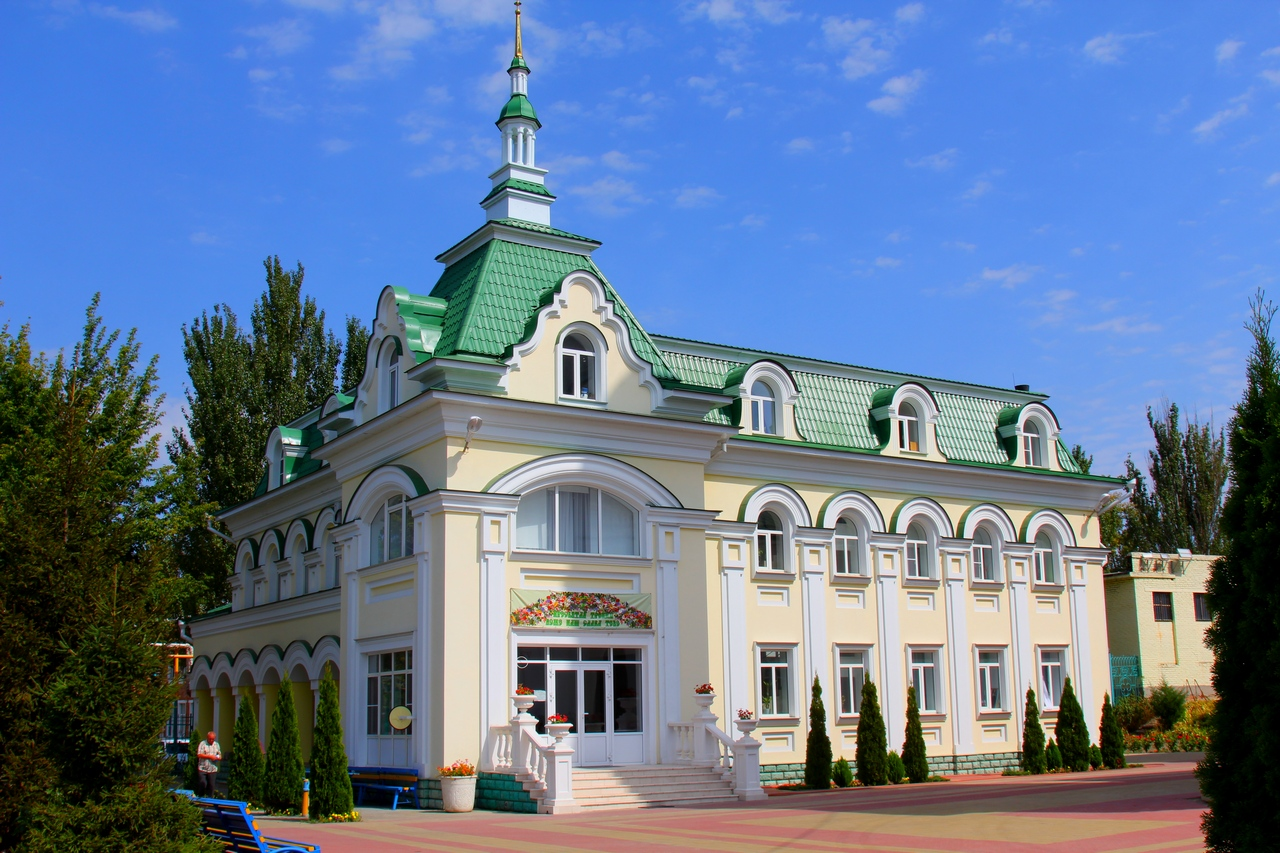
Church school
