= Church of the Ascension (Bataysk) =

Church in Rostov Oblast, Russia

- Храм Вознесения Господня
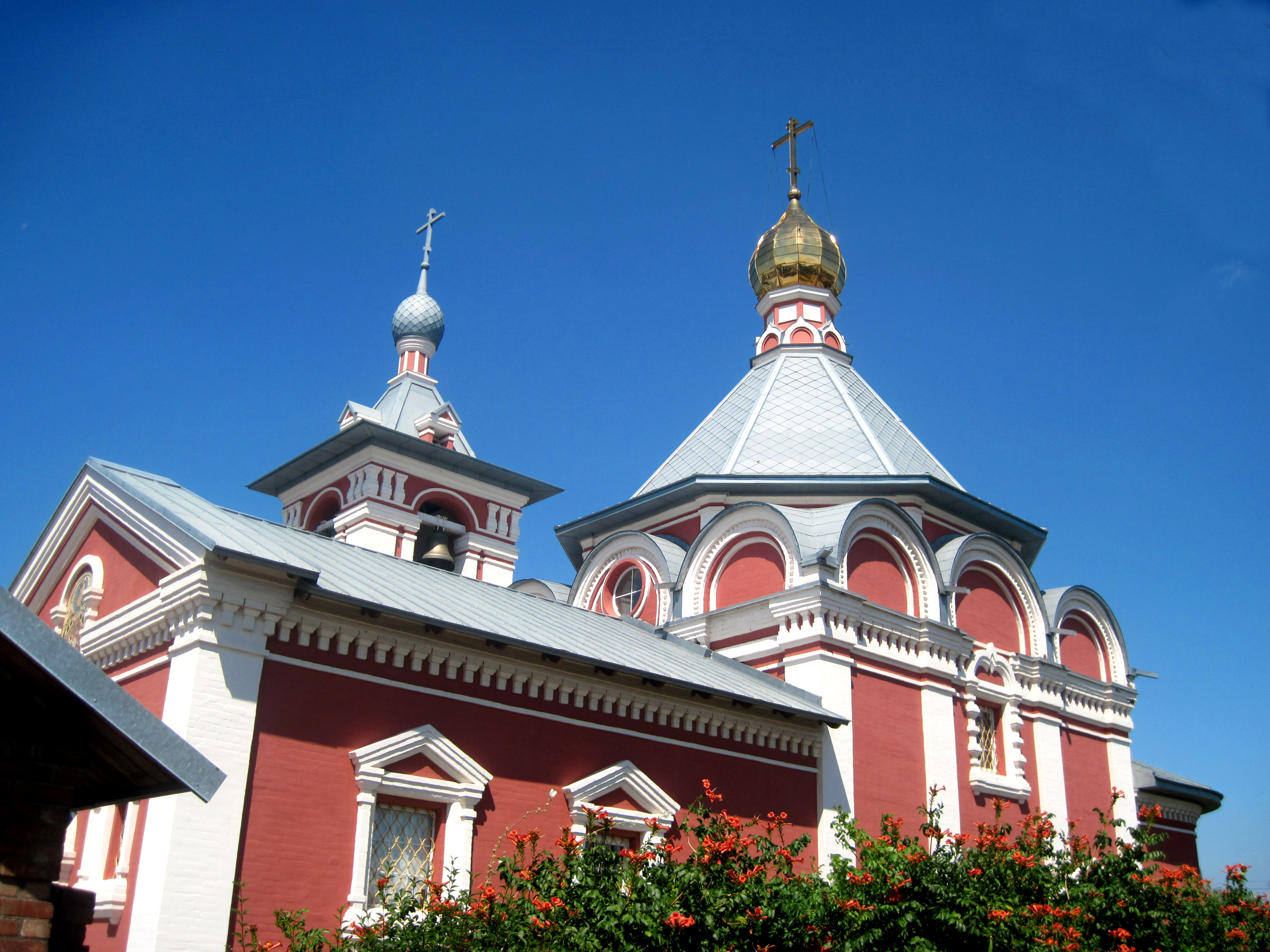
- The church in 2016
- Church of the Ascension
- 47.0734°N 39.4110°E
- Location: Bataysk, Rostov Oblast, Russia
- Country: Russia
- Denomination: Eastern Orthodox

History
- Status: Parish church
- Dedication: Ascension of Jesus

Architecture
- Functional status: Active
- Completed: 2006

Administration
- Division: Patriarchate of Moscow and All Russia

The Church of the Ascension of the Lord (Russian: Храм Вознесения Господня) is a Russian Orthodox church in Bataysk, Rostov Oblast, Russia.

== History ==
The Ascension Church was built in 1872 in Koisug village of Don Host Oblast (now it is situated within the territory of Bataysk town). It belonged to Ekaterinoslav Diocese. The church was wooden, with plinth being built of brick. It had five domes: one big and four small ones. The bell tower of the Ascension church was completely built of brick. According to data of the Economic Department of Holy Synod, as of 1910, the church had a Sunday school, a lodge, a priest's house and ancillary facilities.

In the 1930s, the Ascension Church was closed and destroyed. Only the first tier of the bell tower had been preserved.

In 1989, an Orthodox community of the Ascension Church was registered in Bataysk. In 1990 the restoration of the Ascension church on the project of Boris Vinnikov (in the style of Moscow-Yaroslavl architecture of the 17th century) began in the territory of the former church garden. On November 4, 1995, the first liturgy was served in the new church. Over time, a bell tower was erected, utility rooms were built, and the churchyard was arranged. In 2006, the parish purchased new bells and constructed a belfry. Restoration works were finished in 2006, and on September 5 of the same year the Ascension Church was consecrated.
