= Krymskoye Urban Settlement =

Krymskoye Urban Settlement (Russian: Кры́мское городско́е поселе́ние) is a municipal formation (an urban settlement) in Krymsky Municipal District of Krasnodar Krai, Russia. It is the only urban settlement in the district. Its territory comprises the territory of the Town of Krymsk (an administrative unit with the status equal to that of the districts) and the khutor of Verkhneadagum in Nizhnebakansky Rural Okrug.
