= Krymsk =

Town in Krasnodar Krai, Russia

Krymsk Крымск
- Town
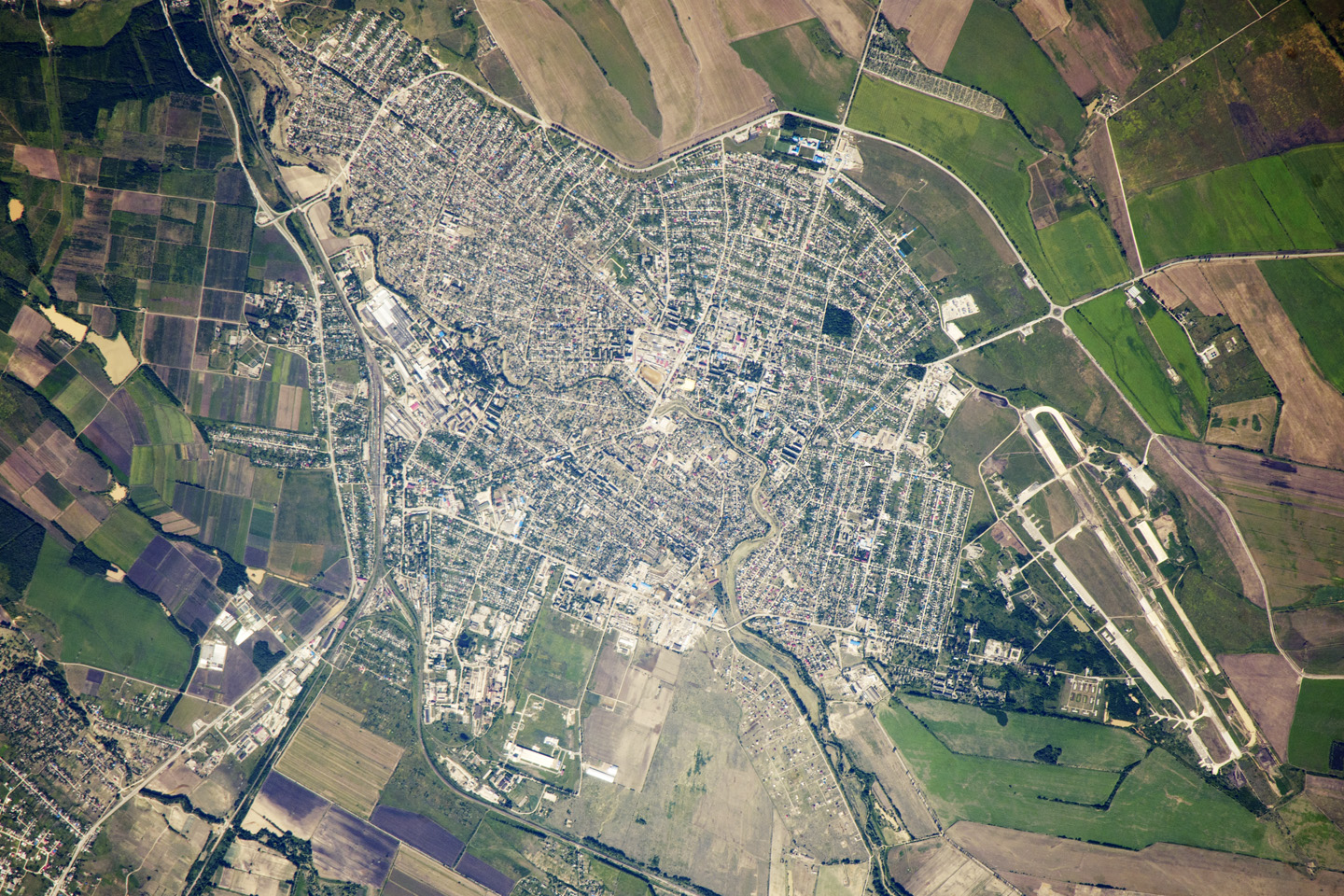

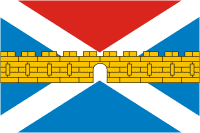
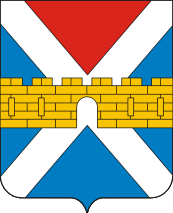
- Flag Coat of arms
- Interactive map of Krymsk
- Location of Krymsk Krymsk (Krasnodar Krai)
- Coordinates: 44°55′24″N 37°58′50″E
- Country: Russia
- Federal subject: Krasnodar Krai
- Founded: 1858
- Town status since: 1958
- Elevation: 24 m (79 ft)

Population (2010 Census)
  - Total: 57,382
  - Estimate (2025): 54,756 (−4.6%)
  - Rank: 287th in 2010

Administrative status
  - Subordinated to: Town of Krymsk
  - Capital of: Town of Krymsk, Krymsky District

Municipal status
  - Municipal district: Krymsky Municipal District
  - Urban settlement: Krymskoye Urban Settlement
  - Capital of: Krymsky Municipal District, Krymskoye Urban Settlement
- Time zone: UTC+3 (MSK)
- Postal code: 353380–353389
- OKTMO ID: 03625101001

Krymsk (Russian: Крымск; Adyghe: Хьэтуехьэблэ, Ḥătueḥăblă; Greek: Κριμσκ) is a town in Krasnodar Krai, Russia. Population: 57,927 (2020), 57,382 (2010 census); 56,623 (2002 census); 50,893 (1989 Soviet census).

== History ==
It was founded in 1858 as the fortress and stanitsa of Krymskaya (Кры́мская), named after the Crimean Cossack Regiment. It was the first capital of the Greek Autonomous District, between 1930 and 1932. The stanitsa was granted town status and given its present name a century later, in 1958. The town's railway station, however, retains the name Krymskaya.

=== 2012 floods ===
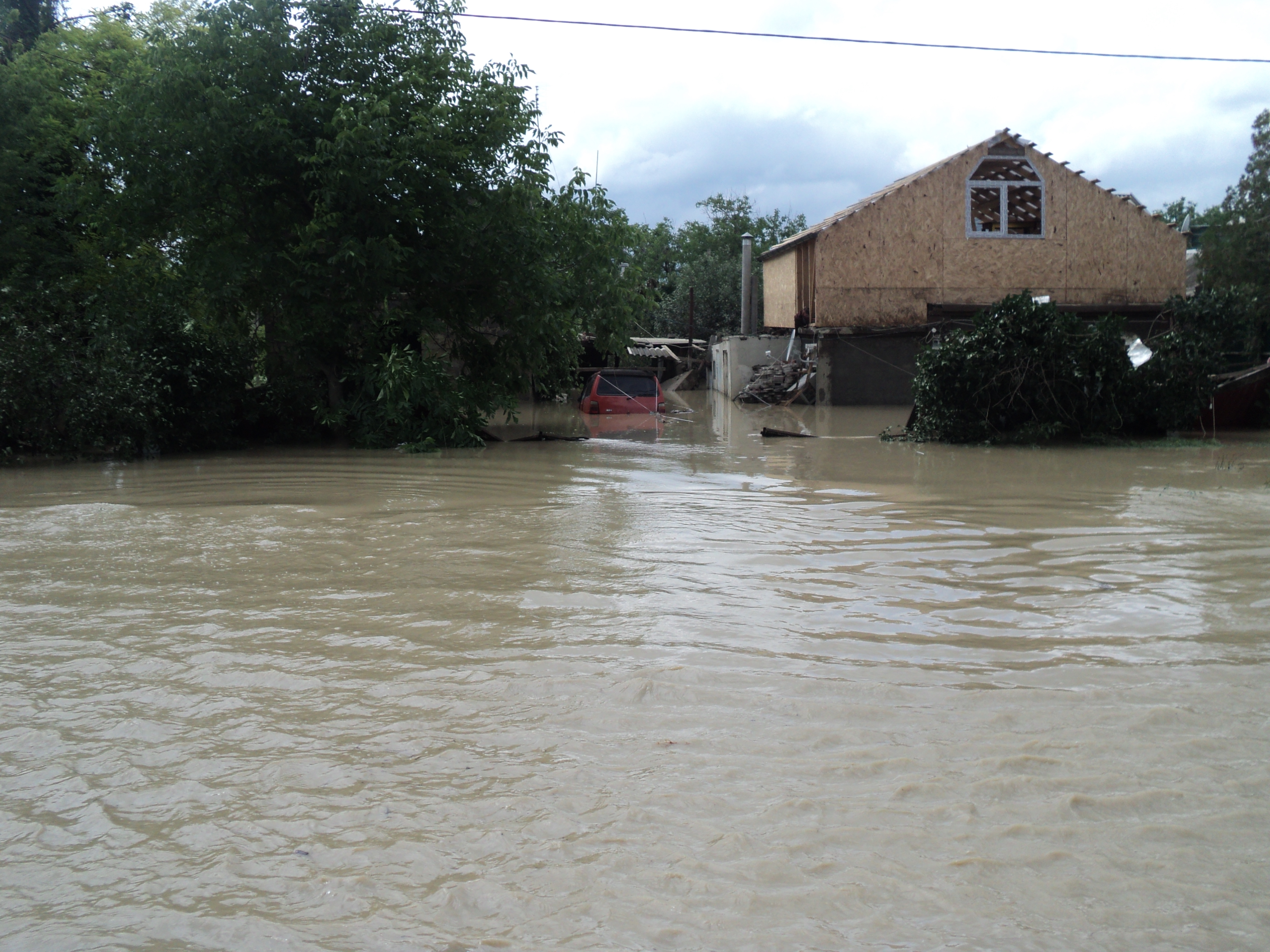
2012 flooding in Krymsk

Krasnodar Krai experienced a flash flood on July 7, 2012, after heavy rains. About 275 millimeters (10.8 in) of rain fell over the region. State television reported that it was an equivalent of three-to-four months' worth of rainfall in a typical year. In the hilly area, water formed torrents that rushed into towns.

One of the worst known calamities in modern times in this region, the flood killed more than 150 people; 140 of the deaths occurred in Krymsk. Subsequently, the Russian government declared a day of mourning on July 9, 2012.

Tsunami-like waves of several meters were reported, although the nearest sea coast (that of the Black Sea) is located about 20 kilometers (12 mi) southwest of Krymsk, and there are mountains between Krymsk and the sea.

The Russian government acknowledged that town authorities were aware of the rising waters at 10 pm on Friday night, but failed to notify the Krymsk residents of the approaching flood. Russian officials admitted this failure was a major error.

== Administrative and municipal status ==
Within the framework of administrative divisions, Krymsk serves as the administrative center of Krymsky District, even though it is not a part of it. As an administrative division, it is incorporated separately as the Town of Krymsk—an administrative unit with the status equal to that of the districts. As a municipal division, the Town of Krymsk, together with the khutor of Verkhneadagum in Nizhnebakansky Rural Okrug of Krymsky District, is incorporated within Krymsky Municipal District as Krymskoye Urban Settlement.

== Climate ==
Krymsk has a humid subtropical climate (Köppen climate classification Cfa).

Climate data for Krymsk
Month	Jan	Feb	Mar	Apr	May	Jun	Jul	Aug	Sep	Oct	Nov	Dec	Year
Mean daily maximum °C (°F)	5.8 (42.4)	5.4 (41.7)	8.4 (47.1)	14.0 (57.2)	18.9 (66.0)	23.0 (73.4)	26.8 (80.2)	26.5 (79.7)	22.0 (71.6)	16.9 (62.4)	11.2 (52.2)	6.9 (44.4)	15.5 (59.9)
Daily mean °C (°F)	3.9 (39.0)	3.3 (37.9)	6.2 (43.2)	11.4 (52.5)	16.1 (61.0)	20.4 (68.7)	24.1 (75.4)	23.9 (75.0)	19.6 (67.3)	14.5 (58.1)	9.1 (48.4)	5.0 (41.0)	13.2 (55.8)
Mean daily minimum °C (°F)	2.1 (35.8)	1.3 (34.3)	3.8 (38.8)	8.5 (47.3)	13.0 (55.4)	17.7 (63.9)	21.2 (70.2)	21.0 (69.8)	16.9 (62.4)	12.0 (53.6)	7.0 (44.6)	3.1 (37.6)	10.6 (51.1)
Average precipitation mm (inches)	98 (3.9)	82 (3.2)	76 (3.0)	71 (2.8)	71 (2.8)	84 (3.3)	65 (2.6)	71 (2.8)	80 (3.1)	102 (4.0)	111 (4.4)	83 (3.3)	994 (39.2)
Source: Krasnodar-meteo.ru

== Military ==
The town has an air base which is located 3.0 miles (4.8 km) to the north. The main fighter regiment at the base has gone through a series of re-organizations and re-designations:

- January 9, 2001: absorbed the 562nd Fighter Aviation Regiment, and renamed 3rd Guards Fighter Aviation Regiment.
- January 12, 2009 renamed 6972nd Guards Aviation Base.

The base is now part of the 4th Air and Air Defence Forces Command.

== Plant breeding ==
Krymsk is known for its experimental plant-breeding station, which holds important scientific collections of, among other crops, green peas, sweetcorn, tomatoes, peppers, aubergines (eggplants), cucumbers, apples, plums, peaches, pears, apricots, strawberries, and melon. The station's stone fruit and quince collections are the largest and most important in Russia or any part of the former Soviet Union. Of the 9,000 accessions of Prunus, about 5,000 to 6,000 are wild species and forms, 500 to 1,000 local varieties, and 2,000 to 3,000 cultivars and breeding materials. The station is also known for the creation of fruit-tree rootstocks, which are named after the town + a number (e.g. Krymsk 1, Krymsk 2, etc.)
