= Greek Autonomous District =

National district of the Soviet Union

Greek Autonomous (National) District Греческий автономный (национальный) район
- Autonomous district of Russian Soviet Federative Socialist Republic
- 1930–1938
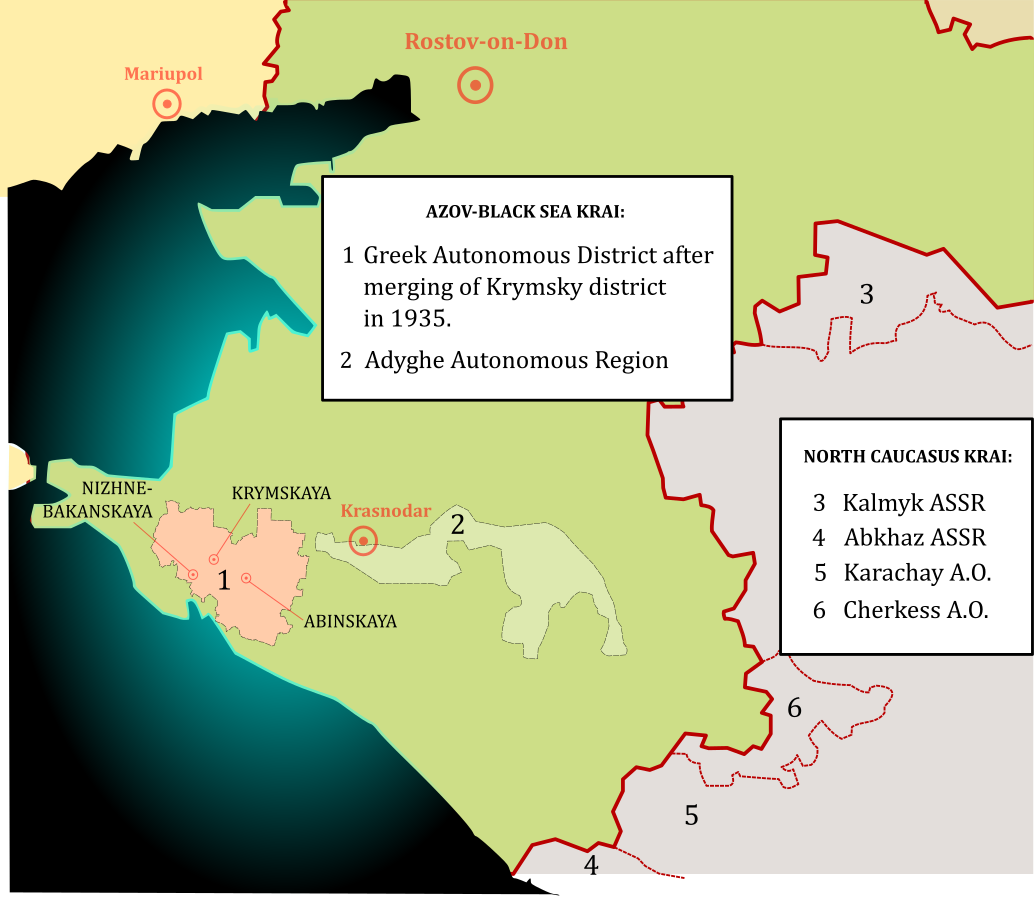
- Greek Autonomous District in borders of 1935-1938
- Capital: Krymskaya
- Area
  - Coordinates: 45°14′N 38°00′E
- History
  - Established: 27 February 1930
  - Disestablished: 22 February 1938

Greek Autonomous District (Russian: Греческий автономный район, romanized: Grechesky avtonomnyy rayon, Greek: Ελληνική Αυτόνομη Επαρχία, romanized: Ellēnikḗ Aftónomē Eparchía) was a national district created according to the policy national delimitation in the Soviet Union. It was established on 27 February 1930 by the decree of the Azov-Black Sea Krai ispolkom, with the capital in stanitsa Krymskaya (now the town of Krymsk). In 1932 the capital was moved to stanitsa Nizhne-Bakanskaya. It was the only one district of republican subordination (i.e., subordinated directly to a Soviet republic, rather than to an intermediate-level administrative entity). This Greek autonomy in the Soviet Union existed until 6 March 1939, when it was disbanded and the administrative entity renamed to Krymsky District by the decree of Krasnodar Krai kraikom of the All-Russian Communist Party, by the end of the first wave of the Soviet repression against ethnic Greeks.
