= Bataysk =

City in Rostov Oblast, Russia

Bataysk Батайск
- City
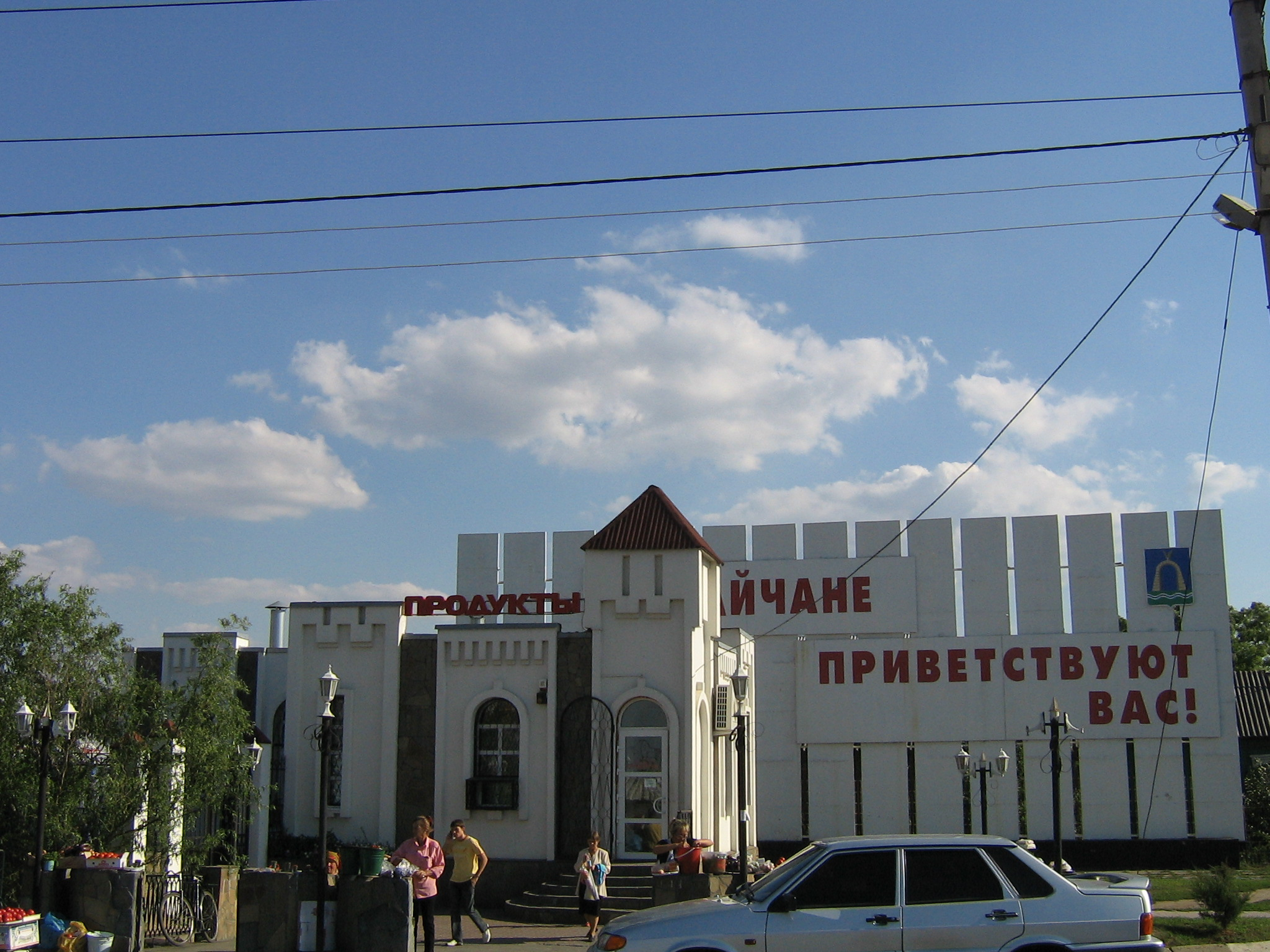
- View of Bataysk

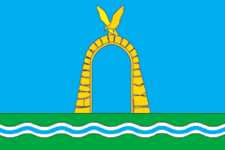
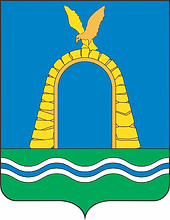
- Flag Coat of arms
- Interactive map of Bataysk
- Location of Bataysk Bataysk (Rostov Oblast)
- Coordinates: 47°10′N 39°44′E
- Country: Russia
- Federal subject: Rostov Oblast
- Founded: 1769
- City status since: 1938

Government
  - Mayor: Valery Putilin
- Elevation: 5 m (16 ft)

Population (2010 Census)
  - Total: 111,843
  - Estimate (1 January 2024): 124,987 (+11.8%)
  - Rank: 141st in 2010

Administrative status
  - Subordinated to: Bataysk Urban Okrug
  - Capital of: Bataysk Urban Okrug

Municipal status
  - Urban okrug: Bataysk Urban Okrug
  - Capital of: Bataysk Urban Okrug
- Time zone: UTC+3 (MSK)
- Postal codes: 346880-346884, 346886-346889, 346892-349894
- Dialing code: +7 86354
- OKTMO ID: 60707000001
- Website: www.батайск-официальный.рф

Bataysk (Russian: Бата́йск) is a city in Rostov Oblast, Russia, located 15 kilometers (9.3 mi) southwest of Rostov-on-Don. Population: 126,988 (2021 census); 111,843 (2010 census); 107,438 (2002 census); 91,930 (1989 Soviet census).

== History ==
It was founded in 1769, and was granted town status in 1938. The reconstructed Church of the Ascension was built between 1990 and 2006. The Church of the Life-Giving Trinity (Bataysk), destroyed in 1937, was reconstructed in 2013. The former Bataysk air base is located nearby.

== Administrative and municipal status ==
Within the framework of administrative divisions, it is incorporated as Bataysk Urban Okrug—an administrative unit with the status equal to that of the districts. As a municipal division, this administrative unit also has urban okrug status.

== Trivia ==
Bataysk has gained international attention since unveiling a "monument that shows a man's hand gripping a nubile female breast", which officials say "will bring family happiness to men who touch it".

== Arts and culture ==
Libraries

- Maxim Gorky Central State Library
- Nadezhda Krupskaya Central State *Children's Library
- Mayakovsky Library
- Chekhov Library
- Pushkin Library
- Leo Tolstoy Library
- Lermontov Library
- Esenin Library
- Nekrasov Library
- Turgenev Library

Places of culture

- MBUC "City center of culture and leisure"
- MBUC "Bataysk History Museum"
- Cinema "Illuzion"

Monuments

- There is a statue of Lenin on the central square
- Train memorial - "to commemorate revolutionary, military and labour glory of Bataysk railway workers"
- Memorial
- Memorial
- There is a stela with MiG-15 in the Aviators park.
- Breast statue
- Monument of the A.Pushkin and his wife N.Goncharova - placed on the Kirov street in 2013.
- First World War memorial - placed on the Privokzalnaya sq. in 2014.
- Sculpture "Bears" - opened in 2019 in the city park
- Monument to Andrew the Apostle

The Bataysk City day is celebrated on the last Sunday of September.

== Notable people ==
- Alexey Petrovich Maresyev

== Sister city ==
- Sremski Karlovci, Serbia
