= 1077th Anti-Aircraft Regiment =

Partially female Soviet unit during the Battle of Stalingrad

- 1077-й зенитный артиллерийский полк
- Country: Soviet Union
- Branch: Soviet Air Defense Forces
- Type: Anti-Aircraft
- Engagements: World War II; Battle of Stalingrad

The 1077th Anti-Aircraft Regiment (Russian: 1077-й зенитный артиллерийский полк, romanized: 1077-y zenitnyy artilleriyskiy polk, lit. '1077th Zenithal [Anti-Aircraft] Artillery Regiment') was a unit of the Stalingrad Corps Region of the Soviet Air Defense Forces that participated in the Battle of Stalingrad in 1942. Under the leadership of Colonel Raiynin, the regiment operated within the Stalingrad Military District and later came under the command of the Stalingrad Front during the battle for the city. Consisting partially of young female volunteers who had recently completed high school, the regiment demonstrated notable bravery in defending the city of Stalingrad (now Volgograd) when they engaged an approaching German Panzers by adjusting their guns to the lowest elevation and directly firing.

== Training and materials ==
English-language sources of information concerning the 1077th unit provide limited and conflicting details. However, it is believed that similar to other anti-aircraft units, they received inadequate training and had insufficient ammunition supplies. Instead of armor-piercing rounds, they were equipped with fragmentation 'flak' rounds, which raises doubts regarding their effectiveness against armored targets. The unit utilized M1939 guns, which were 37-mm replicas of the Bofors guns.

== Action at Stalingrad, August 23–24, 1942 ==
Following the German victory at the Battle of Kalach, German forces turned to strike across the Don River towards Stalingrad. After German spearheads secured bridgeheads across the river on 21st and 22 August, the XIV Panzer Corps attacked on the 23rd, breaking through Soviet defenses and driving towards the Volga River and the northern outskirts of Stalingrad.

One of the first units to offer resistance in this area was the 1077th, covering the Stalingrad Tractor Factory and the Volga ferry near Latashanka. The majority of the regiment was composed of men, but its directing and rangefinding crews and unit headquarters were made up of women. Several women also crewed anti-aircraft guns. The 1077th was notified of the German tanks' approach at 14:30. A post-war history places the regiment's 2nd Battalion as part of the initial defense of the Stalingrad Tractor Factory alongside the 23rd Tank Corps, where they helped repel the German armored breakthrough there. The 6th Battery of the Regiment – dominating the Sukhaya Mechatka ravine – claimed the destruction of 28 German tanks. Later that day, the 3rd Battery, on the road between Yerzovka and Stalingrad, saw particularly intense fighting against the 16th Panzer Division, reportedly fighting "shot for shot". Two women were decorated for their actions that day, and the regiment's report praised the "exceptional steadfastness and heroism" of the women soldiers. The regiment lost 35 guns, eighteen killed, 46 wounded, and 74 missing on 23 and 24 August. Despite the fierce Soviet resistance, the German advance nevertheless reached the Volga north of Stalingrad on 23 August, although Soviet resistance had not been completely suppressed. An interim report of the German Sixth Army made on the 23rd stated that "individual enemy groups are still holding out, particularly Flak nests immediately north and northwest of Stalingrad, which the 16th Panzer Division has still not been able to suppress by nightfall.”

The 16th Panzer Division's history mentioned its encounter with the Soviet flak positions, claiming the destruction of 37 guns, and the unit's surprise that its opponents had in part included women, though the account does not positively identify all 37 positions as specifically belonging to the 1077th. A post-war history of the 16th Panzer Division also noted that each position had to be taken out "gun by gun" and reported that many of the guns were operated by "tough and dogged fighting women." However, the surviving German records do not permit the tank claims of the 1077th to be independently attributed to individual Soviet batteries, as the division level records of the Sixteenth Panzer Divion were destroyed when the unit was surrounded at the end of the Battle of Stalingrad.

The 1077th's participation in the Battle of Stalingrad on the 23rd and 24th has become the subject of popular historical legend. These accounts have exaggerated or simplified the regiment's composition and role, stating that the unit was composed entirely of teenage female volunteers. They have also portrayed the regiment as fighting German armor without support from other Soviet forces and have commonly repeated claims that it destroyed or knocked out 83 German tanks.

== Later service ==
Despite the heavy losses suffered during the initial attack, surviving elements of the unit continued to act as part of the northern defenses of Stalingrad. During the subsequent engagements, two batteries of the 1077th operated in the sector of General S. F. Gorokhov's group. A Soviet postwar history of the Soviet Air Defense Forces (PVO) credits the regiment over the course of the entire Stalingrad campaign with destroying or knocking out 93 tanks, 36 vehicles, 18 artillery and mortar batteries, and up to seven infantry battalions.

The 1077th Anti-Aircraft Regiment continued to serve in the Soviet forces until the end of the war. In May 1945, the regiment became part of the 86th Air Defense Forces Division, operating on the Southwestern Front. In 1945, the 86th Division was responsible for providing air defense support to the Kharkiv and Odessa Military Regions, as well as the Independent Coastal Army.
