= Krymsky District =

Krymsky District Крымский район (Russian)
- District
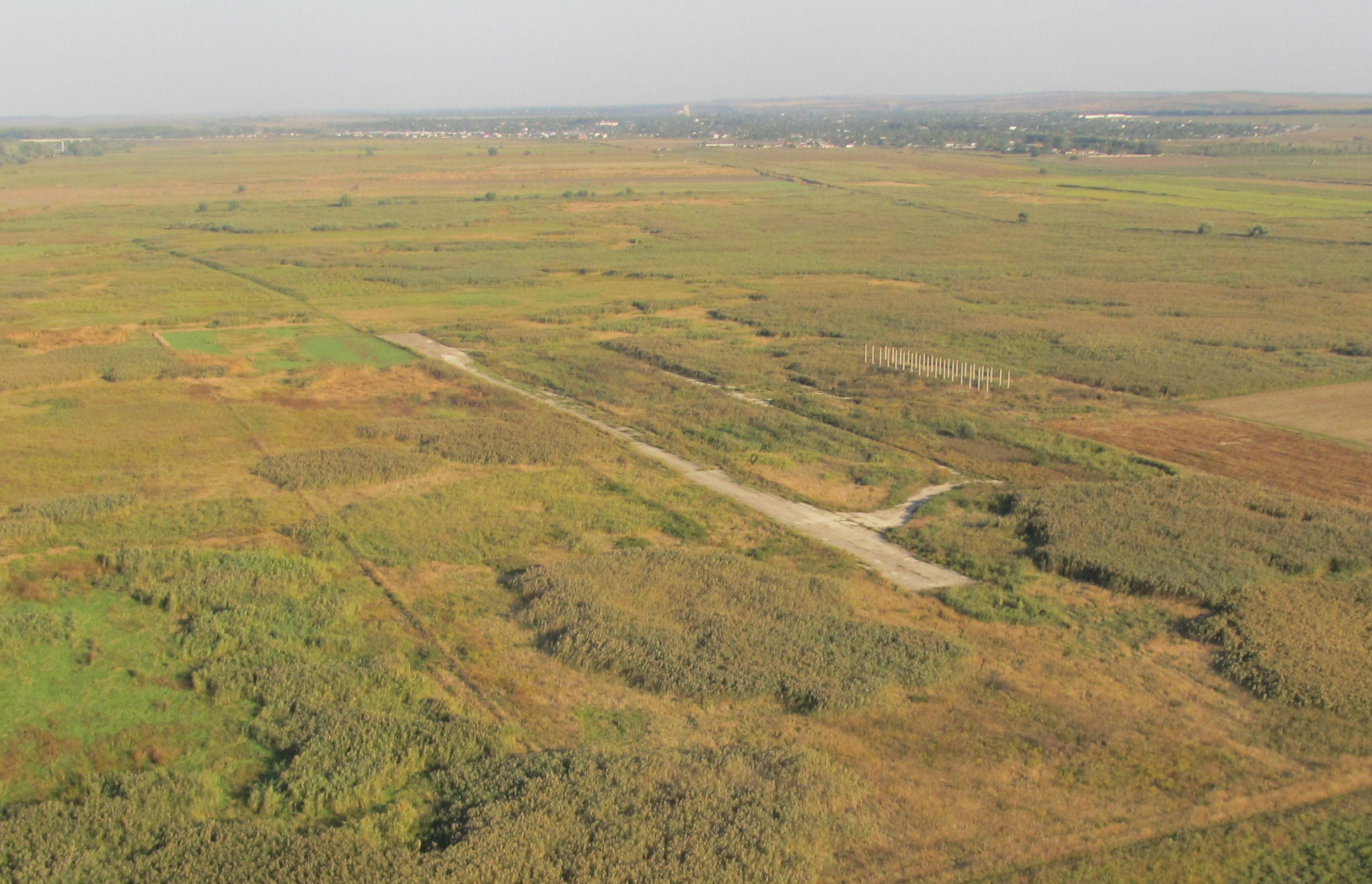
- Landscape in Krymsky District

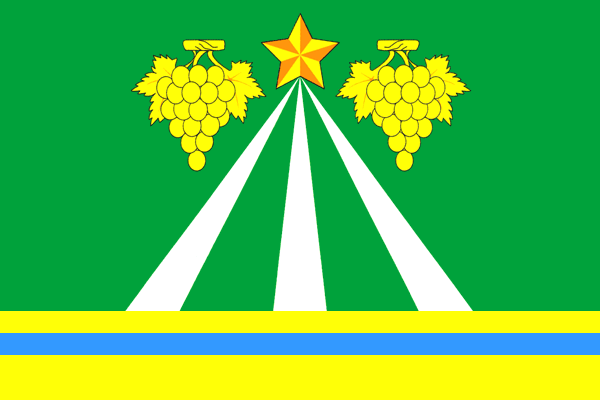
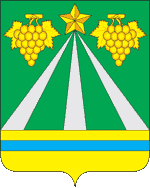
- Flag Coat of arms
- Location of Krymsky District in Krasnodar Krai
- Coordinates: 44°56′37″N 37°59′31″E
- Country: Russia
- Federal subject: Krasnodar Krai
- Established: 2 June 1924
- Administrative center: Krymsk

Area
  - Total: 1,601 km^{2} (618 sq mi)

Population (2010 Census)
  - Total: 74,761
  - Density: 46.70/km^{2} (120.9/sq mi)
  - Urban: 0%
  - Rural: 100%

Administrative structure
  - Administrative divisions: 10 Rural okrugs
  - Inhabited localities: 89 rural localities

Municipal structure
  - Municipally incorporated as: Krymsky Municipal District
  - Municipal divisions: 1 urban settlements, 10 rural settlements
- Time zone: UTC+3 (MSK)
- OKTMO ID: 03625000
- Website: http://www.krymsk-region.ru/

Krymsky District (Russian: Кры́мский райо́н) is an administrative district (raion), one of the thirty-eight in Krasnodar Krai, Russia. As a municipal division, it is incorporated as Krymsky Municipal District. It is located in the west of the krai. The area of the district is 1,601 square kilometers (618 sq mi). Its administrative center is the town of Krymsk (which is not administratively a part of the district). Population: 74,761 (2010 census); 70,576 (2002 census); 62,859 (1989 Soviet census). In 1939, the Greek Autonomous District was abolished and renamed Krymsky District.

== Administrative and municipal status ==
Within the framework of administrative divisions, Krymsky District is one of the thirty-eight in the krai. The town of Krymsk serves as its administrative center, despite being incorporated separately as an administrative unit with the status equal to that of the districts.

As a municipal division, the district is incorporated as Krymsky Municipal District, with the Town of Krymsk, together with the khutor of Verkhneadagum in Nizhnebakansky Rural Okrug, being incorporated within it as Krymskoye Urban Settlement.
