= Monument to Andrew the Apostle =

- Russian: Памятник Андрею Первозванному
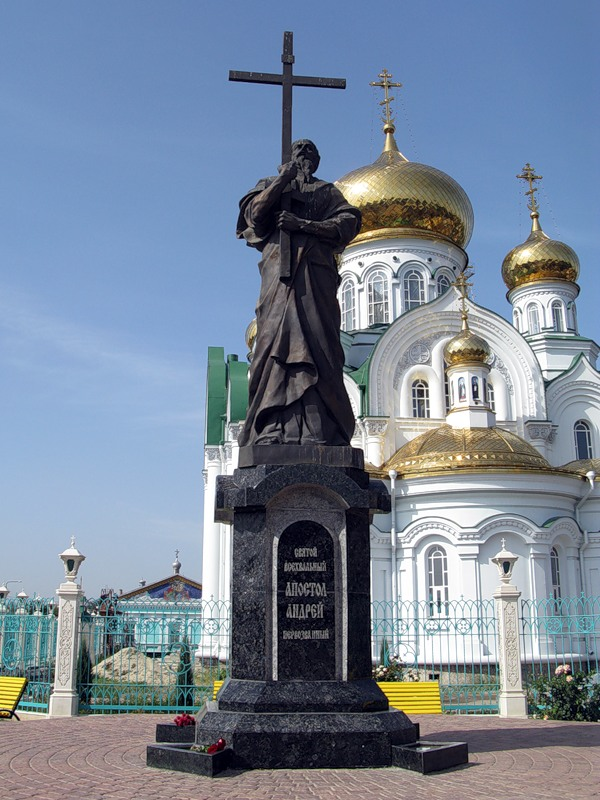
- Interactive map of Monument to Andrew the Apostle
- Location: Saint Andrew Square in Bataysk, Rostov Oblast, Russia
- Coordinates: 47°08′50″N 39°44′15″E
- Designer: Sergei Isakov
- Type: Monument
- Material: Bronze, black labradorite
- Opening date: 2003
- Location in Russia

Monument to Andrew the Apostle (Russian: Памятник Андрею Первозванному) is a bronze monument in the center of Bataysk of Saint Andrew, who was one of the 12 apostles of Christ. The opening ceremony of the monument took place on September 27, 2003, when in old calendar Western Rite Orthodox Parishes Feast of the Cross has been commemorated. Ataman of the Don Cossack Host Nicholay Kozitsin, inhabitants of Bataysk, the Don and Zaporozhian Cossacks, students of the Rostov Maritime College attended at the ceremony. The statue is located on Saint Andrew Square near Holy Trinity Church. The 6-metre statue was designed by Honored Artist of Russia, sculptor Sergei Isakov. Erection of the monument was financed by Saint Nicholas's trust fund, which was the initiator of this project. The monument was built partially on donations, partially with funds from Don Cossacks. Metropolitan of the Diocese of Rostov and Novocherkassk Panteleimon blessed the erection of the statue. The monument in Bataysk is the only monument to Andrew the Apostle on Southern Russia.

== Description ==
The monument is 6 m height. It is located 10 km from the river Don. The bronze sculpture is dressed in an apostolic church cowl. He holds a Latin cross. Saint Andrew is the only Apostle to who the visit of Kievan Rus' is attributable. This trip was begun in the southern border, where mixing of peoples, languages, religions were always the case.

The pedestal is made of black labradorite. Phrases from lives of Andrew the Apostle are carved on its sides. The pedestal is built into a low five-step ladder, which leads to the platform. The square around the monument is paved. This place at the intersection of 50th anniversary of the October Revolution and Kuybyshevskaya street was renamed Saint Andrew Square. The picturesque square for the monument in the center of Batatsk was choose by locals.
