= 11th Composite Aviation Regiment =

Unit in the Russian Aerospace Forces

The 11th Composite Aviation Regiment is a reconnaissance/bomber aviation unit of the Russian Aerospace Forces based at Marinovka Air Base.

It traces its origins to 19 July 1942, when the 11th Independent Reconnaissance Aviation Regiment was formed at Goroshino airfield, 24 km west of Torzhok in the Kalinin Oblast. Holm states it was formed at Koplachki, Kalinin Oblast, from the 3rd independent long-range Reconnaissance Aviation Squadron and from parts of the 506th Bomber Aviation Regiment. Holm also says in November 1942 a third squadron was formed from the 320th independent Reconnaissance Aviation Squadron.

The regiment was equipped with the Pe-2 reconnaissance fighter/bomber and joined 3rd Air Army, fighting in the Vitebsk-Polotsk operation and the defence of Vitebsk, for which it received the honour title 'Vitebsk' on 11 July 1944. After its participation in the Shyaulyay Offensive Operation? Shyaulyay-Mitava operation, it received the Order of the Red Banner on 10 August 1944. In 1952, the regiment converted to the Ilyushin Il-28 'Beagle', based at Jekabpils and Krustpils in the Latvian SSR. It moved to Neu-Welzow in the German Democratic Republic in July 1954, joining 16th Air Army. In August 1968 it took part in the invasion of Czechoslovakia. In mid-1993 it was withdrawn from the former GDR to Marinovka in the North Caucasus.

The regiment was active until the mid-2000s, when it was swept up in the large-scale reorganisation of the Russian Air Force, and became an Aviation Base. Only a reconnaissance aviation squadron remained at the Marinovka airfield. But in December 2015, the 11th Composite Aviation Regiment was formed with a reconnaissance and a bomber squadron at Marinovka, drawing upon former bomber elements of the 559/959 BAPs. As of mid 2016, it formed part of the 1st Guards Composite Aviation Division.
