= Bataysk air base =

Former airport in Rostov Oblast, Russia

Bataysk
- Bataysk, Rostov Oblast in Russia
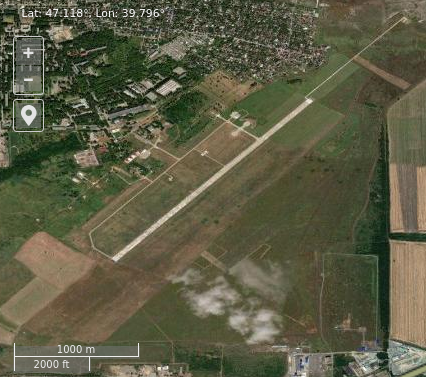
- Satellite imagery of the former Bataysk air base

Site information
- Type: Air Base
- Owner: Ministry of Defence
- Operator: Russian Air Force

Location
- Shown within Rostov Oblast Bataysk (Russia)
- Coordinates: 47°07′03″N 39°47′47″E

Site history
- Built: 1952
- In use: 1952 - 1993

Airfield information
- Elevation: 10 metres (33 ft) AMSL
Runways
Direction	Length and surface
03/21	2,000 metres (6,562 ft) Concrete

Bataysk is a former airbase of the Russian Air Force located near Bataysk, Rostov Oblast, Russia.

The base was home to the 801st Training Aviation Regiment between 1952 and 1993 with the Mikoyan-Gurevich MiG-15 (ASCC: Fagot), Aero L-29 Delfín (ASCC: Maya) & Aero L-39 Albatros.

== See also ==
- List of military airbases in Russia
