= Tinaki =

Tinaki Тинаки
- Settlement
- Location within Astrakhan Oblast Location within Russia
- Coordinates: 46°24′N 47°56′E
- Country: Russia
- Region: Astrakhan Oblast
- District: Narimanovsky District
- Time zone: UTC+4:00

Tinaki (Russian: Тинаки) is a rural locality (a settlement) in Solyansky Selsoviet, Narimanovsky District, Astrakhan Oblast, Russia. The population was 102 as of 2010. There are 6 streets.

== Geography ==
It is located on the Tinaki Lake, 36 km south of Narimanov (the district's administrative centre) by road. Prigorodny is the nearest rural locality.
