= Marinovka, Volgograd Oblast =

Marinovka Мариновка
- Selo
- Location within Volgograd Oblast Location within Russia
- Coordinates: 48°41′N 43°49′E
- Country: Russia
- Region: Volgograd Oblast
- District: Kalachyovsky District
- Time zone: UTC+4:00

Marinovka (Russian: Мариновка) is a rural locality (a selo) and the administrative center of Marinovskoye Rural Settlement, Kalachyovsky District, Volgograd Oblast, Russia. The population was 862 as of 2010. There are 16 streets.

The Marinovka Air Base is located to the south west.

== Geography ==
Marinovka is located 25 km west of Kalach-na-Donu (the district's administrative centre) by road. Prikanalny is the nearest rural locality.
