= Rostov-on-Don North (air base) =

Airport in Rostov Oblast, Russia

Rostov-on-Don North
- Rostov-on-Don, Rostov Oblast in Russia
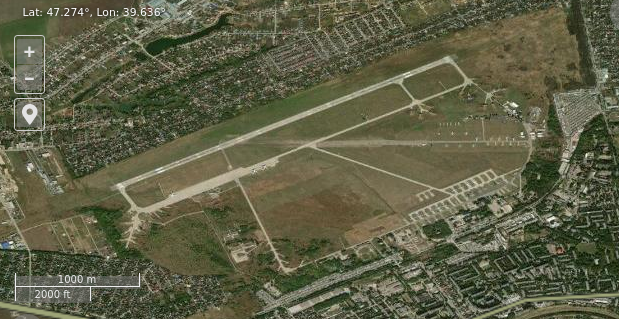
- Satellite imagery of Rostov-on-Don North air base

Site information
- Type: Air Base
- Owner: Ministry of Defence
- Operator: Russian Aerospace Forces
- Controlled by: 4th Air and Air Defence Forces Army

Location
- Shown within Rostov Oblast Rostov-on-Don North (Russia)
- Coordinates: 47°16′27″N 39°38′30″E

Site history
- In use: -present

Airfield information
- Elevation: 87 metres (285 ft) AMSL
Runways
| Direction | Length and surface |
|---|---|
| 05/23 | 2,470 metres (8,104 ft) Concrete |

Rostov-on-Don North is an airbase of the Russian Aerospace Forces located in Rostov-on-Don, Rostov Oblast, Russia.

The base is home to the 30th Independent Composite Transport Aviation Regiment flying Antonov An-12BK, Antonov An-26, Antonov An-148, Ilyushin Il-20M, Mil Mi-24P/V, Mil Mi-26/26T/T3 under the 4th Air and Air Defence Forces Army.

== See also ==
- List of military airbases in Russia
