= Troitsk (air base) =

Airport in Chelyabinsk Oblast, Russia

Troitsk
- Troitsk, Chelyabinsk Oblast in Russia

Site information
- Type: Air Base
- Owner: Ministry of Defence
- Operator: Russian Air Force

Location
- Shown within Chelyabinsk Oblast Troitsk (Russia)
- Coordinates: 54°06′40″N 61°32′17″E

Site history
- Built: 1950
- In use: 1950 - 2010

Airfield information
- Elevation: 10 metres (33 ft) AMSL
Runways
Direction	Length and surface
03/21	790 metres (2,592 ft) Concrete

Troitsk is a former Russian Air Force base located near Troitsk, Chelyabinsk Oblast, Russia.

The base was home to the 385th Fighter Aviation Regiment between 1950 and 1971 with the Lavochkin La-9 (ASCC: Fritz), Mikoyan-Gurevich MiG-15 (ASCC: Fagot), Mikoyan-Gurevich MiG-17 (ASCC: Fresco) and the Sukhoi Su-9 (ASCC: Fishpot), and the 199th Independent Helicopter Squadron between 1991 and 2003 with the Mil Mi-6VPK (ASCC: Hook-B), Mil Mi-8T/PPA (ASCC: Hip-K) and the Mil Mi-24K/P (ASCC: Hind-F).
