= Primorsko-Akhtarsk air base =

Airport in Russia

Primorsko-Akhtarsk
- Primorsko-Akhtarsk, Krasnodar Krai in Russia
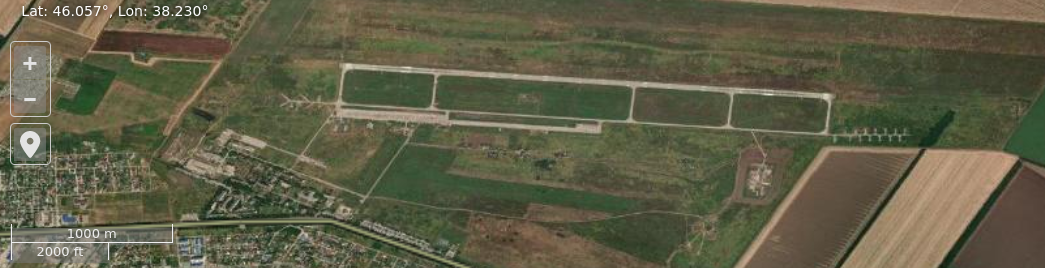
- Satellite imagery of Primorsko-Akhtarsk air base

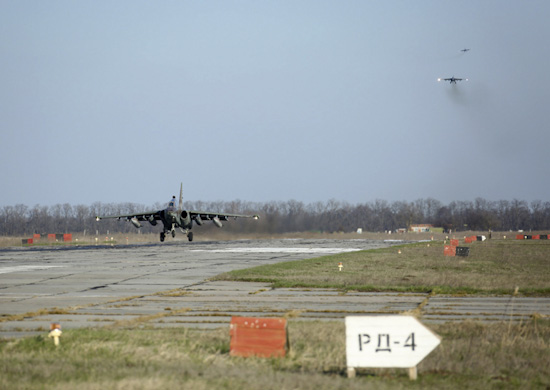
- Primorsko-Akhtarsk air base, Russia

Site information
- Owner: Ministry of Defence
- Operator: Russian Aerospace Forces
- Controlled by: 4th Air and Air Defence Forces Army

Location
- Shown within Krasnodar Krai Primorsko-Akhtarsk (Russia)
- Coordinates: 46°03′26″N 38°13′48″E

Site history
- Built: 1954
- In use: 1954 - present
- Battles/wars: Russo-Ukrainian war

Airfield information
- Elevation: 6 metres (20 ft) AMSL
Runways
Direction	Length and surface
09/27	2,500 metres (8,202 ft) Concrete

Primorsko-Akhtarsk is an air base of the Russian Aerospace Forces as part of the 4th Air and Air Defence Forces Army, Southern Military District.

The base was first used in 1954 by a regiment (1689th) of the Yeysk aviation school. Today it is home to the 960th Assault Aviation Regiment (960th ShAP) which has two squadrons of Sukhoi Su-25SM/SM3 (NATO: Frogfoot-A).

== Russo-Ukrainian war ==
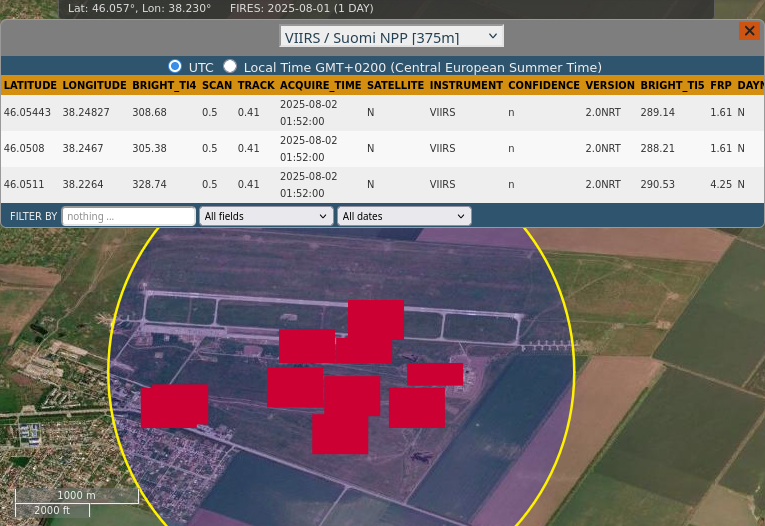
NASA's FIRMS detected a fire on 2 August 2025 01:52:00 (UTC) at and near the Primorsko-Akhtarsk air base

The 559th Bomber Aviation Regiment deployed here from Morozovsk air base with their Sukhoi Su-34s as part of the Russo-Ukrainian war.

On 2 July 2023, Russian Telegram channels claimed that Russian air defences had "downed a missile" leaving a 10m deep, 4m wide crater some 200 metres from the runway. The airbase is used, according to Ukraine, to launch Shahed-136 type drones and Kalibr missiles.

Planet Labs satellite imagery from 28 December 2023 of the air base showed decoy fighter jets painted on the hardstand in an apparent deception tactic against Ukrainian attacks. Similar painted decoys have been seen at Kirovske and Yeysk air base.

On 2 August 2025, Ukrainian long-range UAVs attacked and caused a fire at the base, which was being used for storage and launch of Shahed drones.

== See also ==
- List of military airbases in Russia
