= Kluczewo Airfield =

Former airfield in Stargard Szczeciński

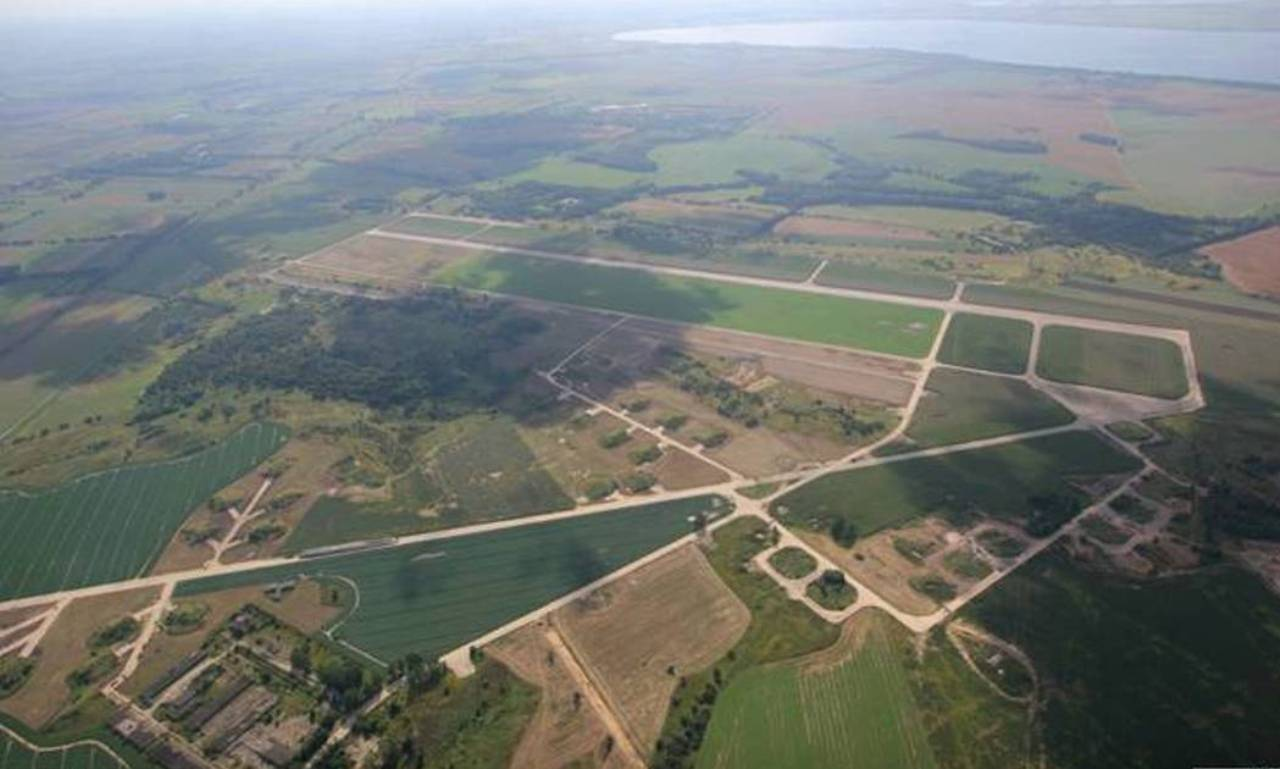
- Airport seen from above, photo from 2007.
- IATA: none; ICAO: none

Summary
- Operator: formerly Soviet Air Force
- Location: Stargard Szczeciński
- Coordinates: 53°16′50″N 14°58′00″E

Map
- Location of airport in West Pomeranian Voivodeship Kluczewo Airfield (Poland)

Runways
Direction	Length		Surface
Direction	ft	m	Surface
325/035	8,250	2,500	concrete
- Disused

Kluczewo Airfield is a former Soviet airbase located in Kluczewo, a suburb of Stargard Szczeciński in Poland. Its concrete runway measured 2,500 by 60 m (8,200 by 200 ft), but it has been closed to air traffic since 1992. Today the area of the former base has been converted into an industrial park.

The base was originally built by the Luftwaffe in 1935 and used as Fliegerhorst Klützow until early 1945 when it was overrun by the Red Army. Soviet air units were based there from 1948 to 1992. Over the years, the base was expanded, and a number of hardened aircraft shelters built. A small military townlet housing the airmen and their families was built nearby. The 239th Fighter Aviation Division was headquartered at the base from 1945 to 1992. The last flying unit stationed there was the 159th 'Novorossiysk' Guards Fighter Aviation Regiment flying Su-27 Flankers. After the Soviet forces left, the base was abandoned, and has fallen into ruin. In 1993 the airfield together with Kluczewo was included within the city limits of Stargard Szczeciński. In subsequent years the runway was used for auto shows from time to time.

Around 2007 Bridgestone announced plans to build a large tire factory near the site. Construction began in June 2007. Since then the runway has been built over and is unlikely to be ever used again.

In July 2007, Polish researchers from the Institute of Environmental Engineering at Częstochowa University of Technology undertook trials of bacteria based bioaugmentation and biostimulation to gain biodegradation of oil hydrocarbons and reduce soil contamination of the site.
