= Marinovka Air Base =

Military airfield in Russia

Marinovka
- Marinovka, Kalachyovsky District, Volgograd Oblast in Russia
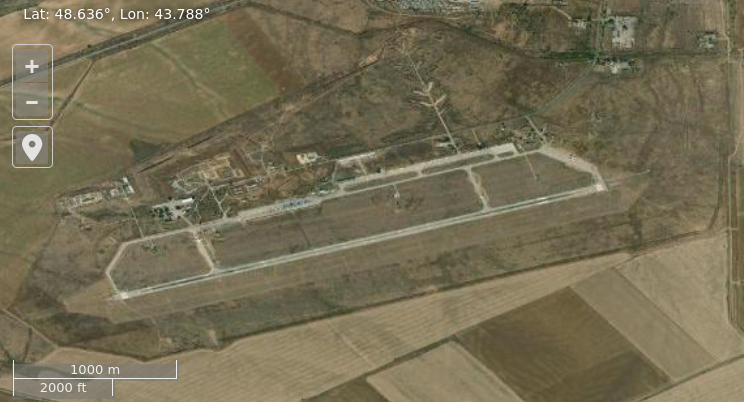
- Satellite imagery of Marinovka air base

Site information
- Owner: Ministry of Defence
- Operator: Russian Aerospace Forces
- Controlled by: 4th Air and Air Defence Forces Army

Location
- Shown within Volgograd Oblast, Russia Marinovka (Russia)
- Coordinates: 48°38′09″N 43°47′17″E

Site history
- In use: Unknown - present

Airfield information
Runways
Direction	Length and surface
06/24	2,463 metres (8,081 ft) Concrete

Marinovka is an air base of the Russian Aerospace Forces as part of the 4th Air and Air Defence Forces Army, Southern Military District.

As of 2022, the base is home to the 11th Composite Aviation Regiment (11th SAP) which had two squadrons of Sukhoi Su-24M/MR (NATO: Fencer-D/E)

== History ==
The base was home to the 168th Guards Bomber Aviation Regiment between 1991 and 1992, and the 296th Fighter-Bomber Aviation Regiment 1993-98.

Some Su-34 and Su-24s were redeployed to the air base after a Ukrainian drone strike on Morozovsk air base. A satellite image from 19 August 2024, appeared to show some 15 Su-34s and 14 Su-24s at the air base.

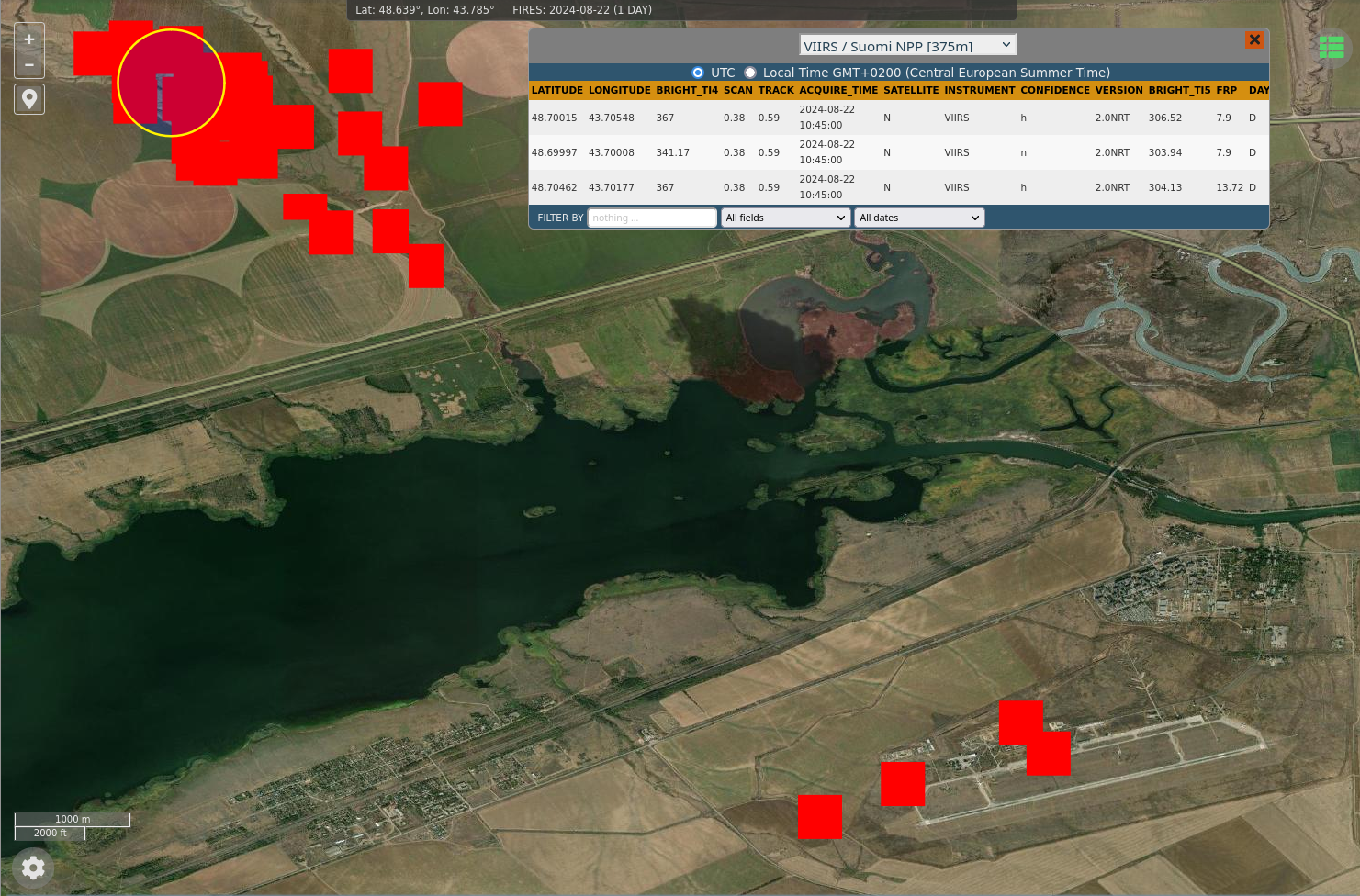
NASA's FIRMS detected multiple fires on and near Marinovka air base on 22 August 2024 10:45:00 (UTC)

On 22 August 2024, during the Russo-Ukrainian War, the air base was attacked by Ukrainian military drones, resulting in explosions and a fire at the air base. The governor of Volgograd Oblast, Andrey Bocharov, claimed that most of the drones had been intercepted, and that the debris from an intercepted drone fell causing a fire. The fires were detected by NASA's FIRMS.

On 27 June 2025, the air base was again targeted by Ukrainian military drones, destroying and damaging four Su-34 fighter bombers. The attack also hit the airfield's technical support section, a facility used for maintenance and repair of combat aircraft.

On 30 October 2026, a Neptune missile strike destroyed two Su-34s at the Marinovka Air Base.

== See also ==
- List of military airbases in Russia
