= Erebuni Airport =

Airport in Yerevan, Armenia

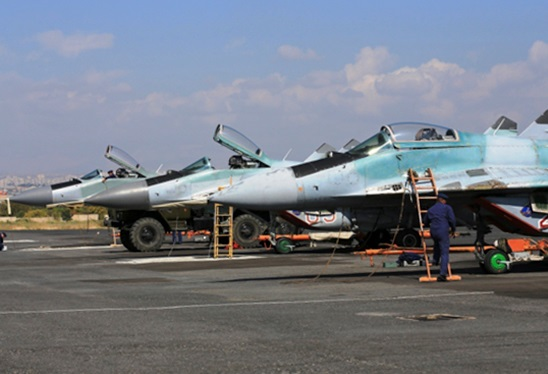
- Russian MiG-29s at Erebuni
- IATA: none; ICAO: UDYE

Summary
- Airport type: Military
- Owner: Armenian Air Force
- Operator: Russian Air Force
- Location: Yerevan
- Elevation AMSL: 2,955 ft / 901 m
- Coordinates: 40°07′42″N 44°28′22″E
- Interactive map of Erebuni Airport

Runways
Direction	Length		Surface
Direction	ft	m	Surface
03/21	8,694	2,650	Asphalt
- Source: armats.com

Erebuni Airport (Armenian: Էրեբունի օդանավակայան) (ICAO: UDYE) is a military airport serving Yerevan and the country of Armenia. It is located 7.3 kilometres (4.5 mi) south of the center of Yerevan. At present, the airport is mostly operated by the military and is host to the Russian 3624th Air Base and hosts a squadron of MiG-29s and Mi-24 attack helicopters. Private firms do on occasion operate chartered helicopter flights inside the country and to the CIS. The airport is also home to a single Diamond DA40 aircraft used by the local flying school.

== History ==
The base was designed by architects L. Sh. Khristaforian and R. G. Asratian and design engineers E. N. Tosunian and I. G. Baghramian.

In 1938, the 4th Voroshilov Aviation Squadron, part of the Transcaucasian Military District, was based at the airfield, outfitted with I-15, I-16 and I-153 aircraft. In 1939, the 84th Fighter Aviation Regiment was created out of the squadron, which at the beginning of the Second World War served as the basis for the formation of two regiments.

The first (July 1941) was the 84th “A” Fighter Aviation Regiment, equipped with I-153s, dividing the 84th IAP into two parts. The 84th "A" Fighter Aviation Regiment became part of the 135th Mixed Air Division of the Trancaucasian Military District Air Force. It was subsequently redesignated the 348th Fighter Aviation Regiment.

The second was (July 30, 1941) was the second 84th “A” fighter Aviation Regiment (also made up of I-153s), separate from the 84th IAP. It was redesignated the 101st Guards Fighter Aviation Regiment.

The 84th Fighter Aviation Regiment was dissolved on December 24, 1942.

After Armenia's independence, to help redress its relative military weaknesses compared to Azerbaijan and Turkey, on 16 March 1995 it signed a treaty with Russia giving the latter a 25-year-long military presence in Armenia. On 27 September 1996 a succeeding agreement was signed which authorized the establishment of Russian aviation bases at Gyumri and Yerevan. Russian aviation forces in Armenia comprise 18 MiG-29 fighters of the 426th Fighter Squadron and the 700th Air Traffic Control Center, both at the 3624th Air Base at Erebuni Airport outside Yerevan. Russian fighter aircraft arrived in four separate batches: five MiG-29s on 16 December 1998, five on 26 February 1999, four more on 18 June and the final four on 22 October 1999.

In November 2013, the Armenian government announced its intention to expand the space allotted to the Russian Air Force to house new buildings, fuel-storage facilities, and helicopter landing pads to host a squadron of 18 attack helicopters. In January 2014, the press service of the Russian Southern Military District confirmed that a contingent of Mi-24P (Hind-F) attack helicopters, Mi-8MT and Mi-8SMV military transport helicopters would be deployed at Erebuni through the course of the year.

== Incidents ==
On 4 November 2008, an Mi-24 attack helicopter of the Armenian Air Force crashed as it was preparing for a training flight. Captain Arshak Nersisyan died in the accident.

== See also ==
- List of airports in Armenia
- List of the busiest airports in Armenia
- Military of Armenia
- Transport in Armenia
