= Krymsk air base =

Airport north of Krymsk, Russia

Krymsk
- Krymsk, Krasnodar Krai in Russia
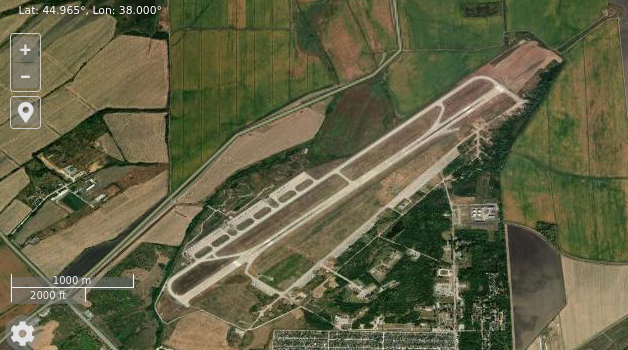
- Satellite imagery of Krymsk air base

Site information
- Owner: Ministry of Defence
- Operator: Russian Aerospace Forces
- Controlled by: 4th Air and Air Defence Forces Army

Location
- Shown within Krasnodar Krai, Russia Krymsk (Russia)
- Coordinates: 44°57′54″N 38°00′00″E

Site history
- In use: Unknown - present

Airfield information
- Identifiers: IATA: NOI
Runways
Direction	Length and surface
04/22	2,470 metres (8,104 ft) Concrete

Krymsk is an air base of the Russian Aerospace Forces as part of the 4th Air and Air Defence Forces Army, Southern Military District. The base is also known as the 6972nd Air Force Base is an airport located 4.8 kilometres (3.0 mi) to the north of Krymsk.

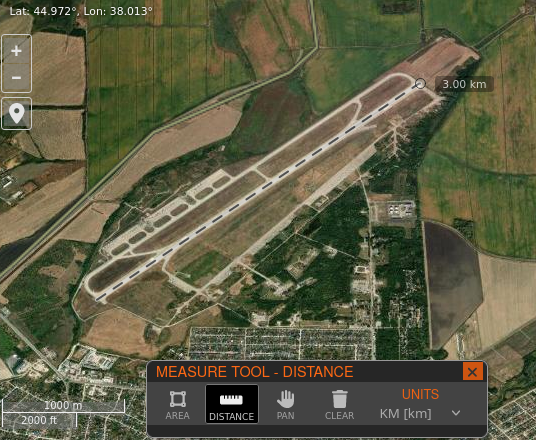
NASA's FIRMS shows runway 04/22 extended to 3.00 km

As of 2024 satellite imagery shows runway 04/22 extended to 3.00 km.

== History ==
In 2011, the airfield was closed for renovation.

The main fighter regiment at the base had gone through a series of re-organizations and re-designations by 2012:

- January 9, 2001: absorbed the 562nd Fighter Aviation Regiment, and renamed 3rd Guards Fighter Aviation Regiment.
- January 12, 2009: renamed 6972nd Guards Aviation Base.

As of February 2022, the base was home to the:

- 1st Guards Composite Aviation Division HQ
  - 3rd Composite Guards Aviation Regiment with two squadrons of Sukhoi Su-27M3 (NATO: Flanker)

=== 2012 flooding ===
According to Izvestiya, the airbase suffered from floods in Krymsk in July 2012. An eyewitness reported that the flow of water washed sand and rubble destined for the runway, under the water were not only pits, but also the basements and first floors of residential and administrative buildings of the military townlet. "About 15 combat aircraft flooded, which did not have time to take out before reconstruction. At the same time, the builders and the military were most afraid that aviation kerosene would be poured out due to the elements and the bombs would begin to tear". In the same article, an unnamed representative of the military district said that at the time of the reconstruction at the airfield there were only "aircraft taken out of service and in storage" and there was no fuel and ammunition affected by the flood.

The Russian Ministry of Defence denied reports of serious damage to the airfield. A spokesman for the Southern Military District said: "The message that the airfield in Krymsk was badly damaged and 200 million rubles would be required for its reconstruction is not true." He also stressed that the airfield "is located on a hill, and the maximum amount of water at the very peak of the flood reached a height of 10 centimeters".

After the floods, 5,500 military were deployed to the city of Krymsk to help rebuild the city, and a military campground was built on the airfield of the Krymsk airfield.

=== Russo-Ukrainian war ===
On the night of 14 November 2024, during the Russo-Ukrainian War, Ukraine launched a massive drone attack on the Krymsk military airfield, where Su-27 and Su-30 fighter jets and Ka-27 helicopters are stationed. The Russian Ministry of Defence said they shot down 51 drones using conventional air defence capabilities and that no casualties were reported.

== See also ==
- List of military airbases in Russia
