= 51st Air Defence Division =

Russian Aerospace Forces formation

The 51st Air Defense Division, abbreviated 51 dpvo, (Military Unit Number 42352) is an air defense formation of the 4th Air and Air Defence Forces Army of the Russian Aerospace Forces, which in turn is operationally subordinate to the Southern Military District. The headquarters is located in Novocherkassk.

== History ==
It traces its history to the formation of a divisional region of air defence first established in December 1941. By April 1, 1942, the 1077th Anti-Aircraft Regiment was part of the Stalingrad Divisional Region of Air Defence, and by 1 October 1942, the formation had been elevated to the Stalingrad Corps Region of Air Defence. December 25, 1941 is considered the official day of the formation of the formation. On December 6, 1943, the formation was awarded the Order of the Red Banner, for the feats shown by personnel in the defence of Stalingrad.

In 1942 and 1943 the Stalingrad Corps Region formed part of the Don Front, the Southern Front, and by December 1943 the Eastern Air Defence Front (ru:Восточный фронт ПВО). The Stalingrad Corps Region became the 9th Air Defence Corps on 21 April 1944, and the 9 Stalingrad Red Banner Air Defence Corps by 07/28/1944.

During the Great Patriotic War, the division [later corps] covered a combat path of 2,400 kilometres from Stalingrad to Budapest. On the combat account of the soldiers of the formation, there are 812 downed aircraft, 173 destroyed tanks, 150 vehicles, 163 enemy firing points, 46 artillery and mortar batteries, up to 11 regiments of enemy manpower. For courage and heroism shown in the fight against the Nazi invaders, 17 servicemen of the division were awarded the high title of Hero of the Soviet Union. For the entire period of its existence, 40 Heroes of the Soviet Union served in the combat formations of the unit. Among them were triple Hero of the Soviet Union Marshal of Aviation Alexander Pokryshkin, and twice Heroes of the Soviet Union Alexander Koldunov and Sergey Lugansky. At the end of 1945, having completed the assigned tasks, the corps was relocated to Kharkiv, and then to Dnepropetrovsk [now Dnipro].

The 45th Stalingrad Red Banner dpvo was at Rostov-on-Don under the Southwestern Air Defence District (ru:Юго-Западный округ ПВО) by August 1946. The 45th Division of PVO came under the command of the SW Air Defence District.

Today's antecedent 12th Air Defence Corps was established in March 1960 in Rostov-on-Don, part of the Baku Air Defence District of the Soviet Air Defence Forces. The 10th Air Defence Division was disbanded in 1973 and its units, including the 393rd Guards Fighter Aviation Regiment at Privolzhskiy, Astrakhan Oblast, became part of the corps. In 1980 the Baku Air Defence District was disbanded, and the corps came under the command of the 8th Air Defence Army, centred in Ukraine, in April 1980. It was then transferred again to the new 19th Air Defence Army in April 1986.

After the fall of the Soviet Union the formation came under the control of the Russian Air Defence Forces. It became the 51st Air Defence Corps in July 1998, and the 7th Brigade of Air-Space Defence in 2009. The headquarters moved to Novocherkassk in April 2012. It was reorganised from the 7th Brigade of Air-Space Defence into the 51st Air Defence Division in 2014.

Today it appears to include the 1536th Anti-Aircraft Rocket Regiment (Rostov-na-Don, Rostov Oblast); the 1537th Anti-Aircraft Rocket Regiment (Novorossiysk, Krasnodar Kray); the 1721st Anti-Aircraft Rocket Regiment; and two radar ("radio-technical") units.
