= 2022 Transnistria attacks =

Attacks in Moldova's breakaway region of Transnistria

- Part of the Transnistria conflict and spillover of the Russian invasion of Ukraine
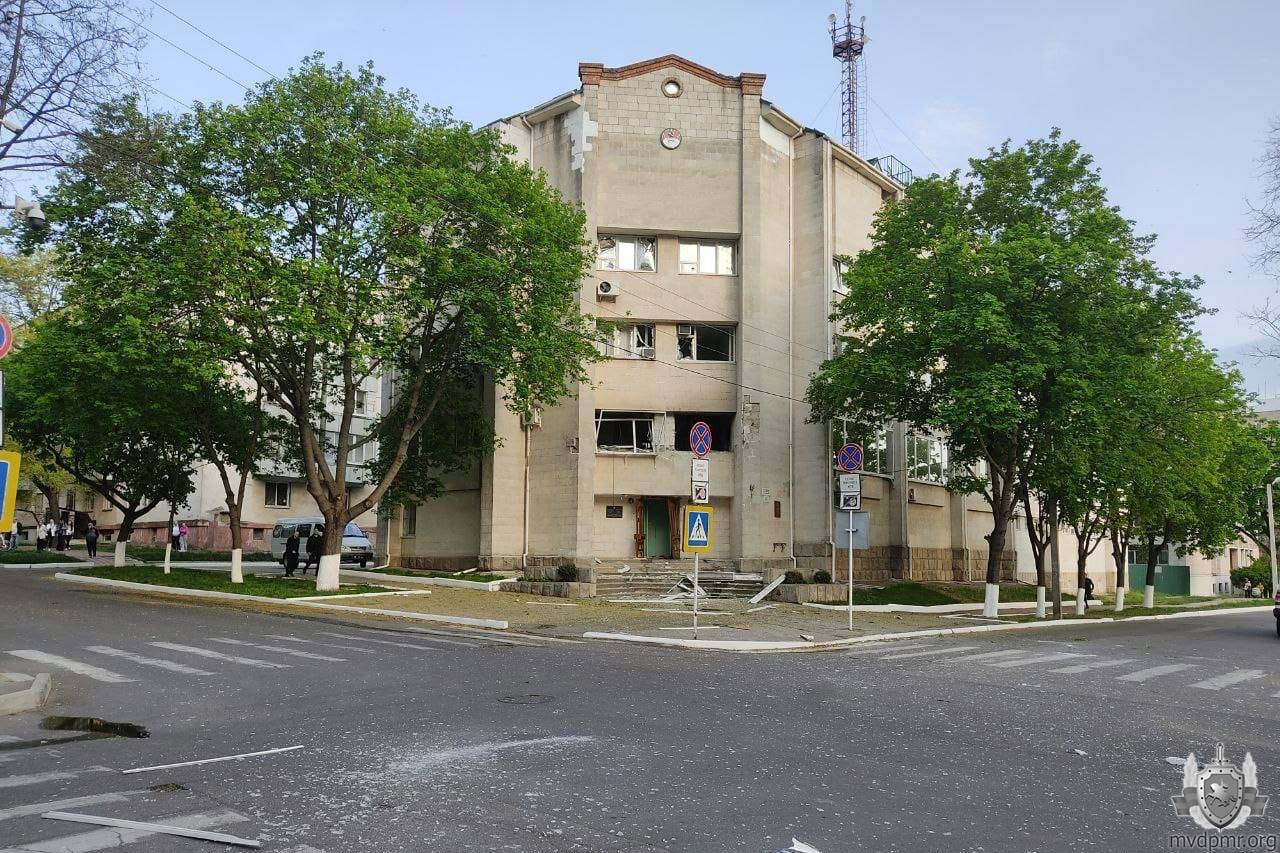
- Front of the damaged building of the Ministry of State Security
- Location: Cobasna, Maiac, Tiraspol, Vărăncău and Vladimirovca, in Transnistria
- Date: 25–27 April, 6 May and 5 June 2022
- Target: Ministry of State Security; Tiraspol Airport; Grigoriopol transmitter; Cobasna ammunition depot; Former aerodrome in Vărăncău; Military reserve unit in Vladimirovca
- Attack type: Bombings
- Weapons: RPG-18 and RPG-27 grenade launchers (ministry attack); Drones armed with explosives (Tiraspol Airport, Cobasna, Vărăncău and Vladimirovca attacks); Anti-tank mines and plastic explosives (Maiac attack)
- Deaths: None
- Injuries: None
- Perpetrators: Unknown, but possibly a false flag operation by Russia or Transnistria itself
- Defender: Transnistria
- Motive: Likely an aim to escalate Moldova–Transnistria tensions or to bring Transnistria into the Russian invasion of Ukraine

The 2022 Transnistria attacks were a series of five incidents reported in the Eastern European breakaway state of Transnistria, internationally recognized as part of Moldova, that occurred in 2022 between 25 and 27 April, on 6 May and on 5 June. No casualties were reported, but material damage did occur.

== Background ==
Speculation about the possible role that Transnistria could adopt during the Russian invasion of Ukraine has been made ever since the start of the war and even before, during its prelude. Before the war, American officials accused Russia of preparing "provocations" against Russian soldiers stationed in Transnistria in order to create a casus belli for a Russian invasion of Ukraine. Further, on 24 February, on the first day of the invasion, there were allegations that some rockets that had hit Ukraine had been launched from Transnistria, although Moldova's Ministry of Defense denied this. Later, on 6 March, there were again claims that attacks that had hit Vinnytsia's airport had been launched from Transnistria, although Moldovan officials again denied this and said that they had been launched from Russian ships in the Black Sea.

Amid rumors that Transnistria would attack Ukraine, the President of Transnistria Vadim Krasnoselski declared that Transnistria is a peaceful state which never had any plans to attack its neighbors and that those who spread these allegations were people without control over the situation or provocateurs with malicious intentions. He also made reference to the large ethnically Ukrainian population of Transnistria and how Ukrainian is taught in Transnistrian schools and is one of the official languages of the republic. However, in March, an image of the President of Belarus Alexander Lukashenko standing in front of a battle plan map of the invasion of Ukraine was leaked. This map showed a supposed incursion of Russian troops from the Ukrainian city port of Odesa into Transnistria and Moldova, revealing that Transnistria could get posteriorly involved in the war.

In April, a week before the attacks in Transnistria, Major General and acting commander of Russia's Central Military District Rustam Minnekaev raised the issue of Russian speakers in Transnistria, echoing Russia's justifications for the war in Ukraine. Minnekaev announced that the plan of Russia's military action in Ukraine included taking full control of Southern Ukraine and achieving a land corridor to Transnistria. He also talked about the existence of supposed evidence of "oppression of the Russian-speaking population" of Transnistria.

== Attacks ==
=== Security ministry building ===
On 25 April, explosions hit the headquarters of Transnistria's Ministry of State Security in Tiraspol, the republic's capital, at 15:00 GMT. The Militsiya blocked off the streets near the incident and instructed no one to approach. Preliminary reports described it as a grenade launcher attack. It was undertaken with RPG-18 and RPG-27 launchers. The latter are only used by the armies of Russia, Transnistria, Gabon and Jordan, which may suggest that it could have been perpetrated by one of the first two.

On 26 April, a "group of patriots" as they called themselves of the Ministry of State Security of Transnistria sent a document in Russian to the editorial team of the Moldovan newspaper AVA appealing to the Moldovan state authorities, to representatives of diplomatic missions in Moldova and to Moldovan and Ukrainian media and law enforcement institutions. This document included a list of people reportedly involved on the attack at the ministry building. It said that the attack had been organized by Razgonov Vitaly Leonidovich, an advisor to the president of Transnistria and a major general who joined Transnistria in 2019. He would have formed a network of people in Transnistria to destabilize the region. These people involved in the attack, being eight in total and many with Russian citizenship, include Transnistrian government and army officials, civil servants and heads of organizations and media outlets, and all of them had their own pseudonyms. This text ended with the phrase "Let's keep peace at the Dniester together!!".

On 27 April, TV PMR released a video on its Telegram account of the attack on the ministry building. The TV channel reported that unknown people arrived in Tiraspol in a car from the area of Grigoriopol after illegally crossing the border between Transnistria and Ukraine. It also said that it only took 20 seconds for these persons to effectuate the attack and that the license plate of their car was EL 387 RJ.

No injuries have been reported following the ministry attack, and no one has claimed responsibility for it either.

=== Tiraspol Airport ===
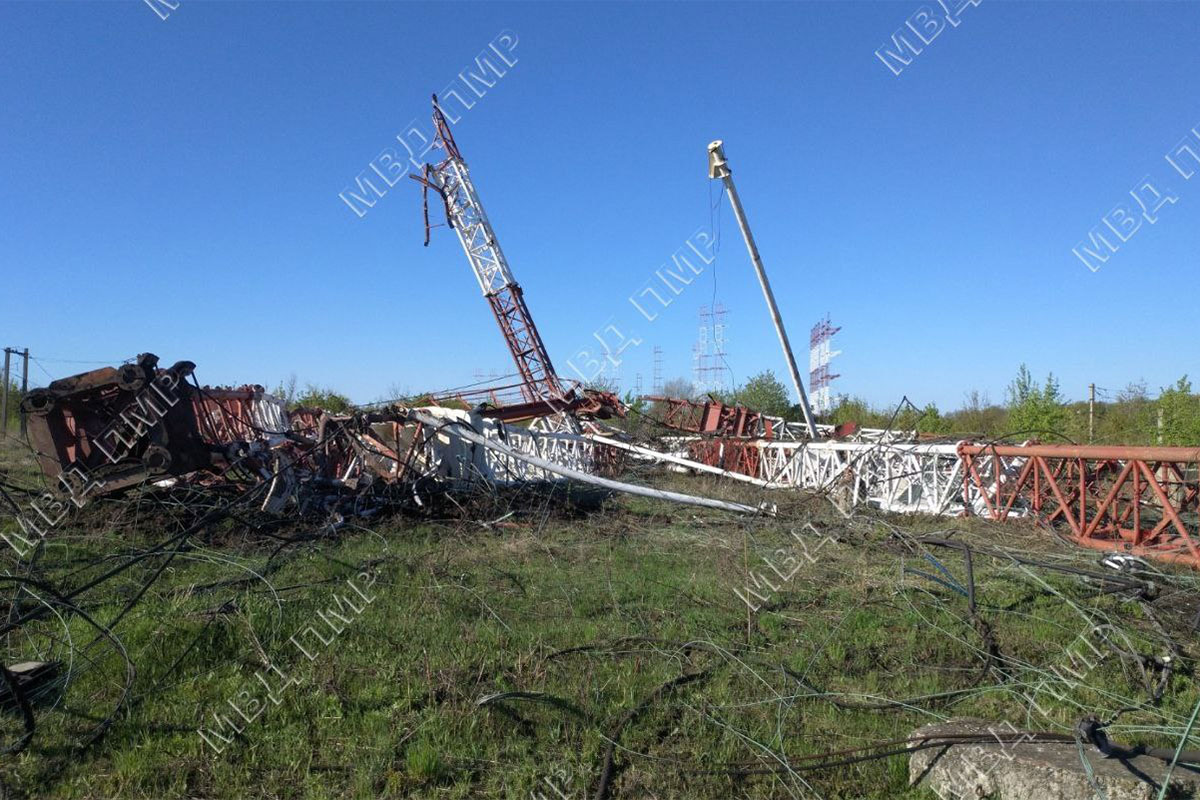
One of the two destroyed antennas at the Grigoriopol transmitter site

Following the attack to the security ministry building, at 23:30 still on 25 April, the Tiraspol Airport was attacked from the air, possibly having been from a drone strike; two explosives had been dropped on the air base of the airport. The windows and hood of a ZIL-131 truck were damaged. There also were reports on that day that a military unit of the Armed Forces of Transnistria had been attacked near Parcani. The Transnistrian authorities did not officially confirm the explosions in the Tiraspol Airport, which were initially reported by Moldova. It was later clarified that both reports referred to the same event at the air base in Tiraspol.

=== Grigoriopol transmitter ===
On 26 April, two explosions in the Grigoriopol transmitter were reported in Maiac, the first one at 06:40 and the second at 07:05, knocking out two radio antennas that broadcast Russian radio stations. The affected antennas were the most powerful in the site, one having a power of 1 MW and the other having a power of 500 kW. No injuries were reported on the site and nobody has claimed responsibility. The Investigative Committee of Transnistria later announced that the group of people who would have caused the explosions ranged from 5 to 10 persons. They arrived to the transmitter during the night. The center's large coverage area of 900 hectares (2,200 acres) and its designation as a civil installation led the site to be underguarded, allowing the group to camp freely around the center. Antennas of the center were mined with anti-tank mines connected by detonating cords and with plastic explosives, some of which did not explode at the time of the attack. Those that did took down the two antennas, the first of which fell after the destruction of one of its pillars, which caused the structure to collapse. A criminal case was started against these people, who were accused of terrorism and could face 20 years in prison.

=== Cobasna ammunition depot ===
On 27 April, the Ministry of Internal Affairs of Transnistria reported that several drones flew over Cobasna, which is only around two kilometres (1 1/4 mi) away from the border with Ukraine, and that shots were fired at the village. The ministry claim that the drones came from Ukraine. Cobasna hosts an ammunition depot which is one of the biggest if not the biggest in Eastern Europe. The weapons stored there are expired, and if they exploded, the strength of the explosion would be similar to that of the atomic bombings of Hiroshima and Nagasaki. It is currently guarded by a group of around 1,500 Russian troops.

=== Former airfield in Vărăncău ===
On 6 May at 9:40, there were four explosions near a former airfield in Vărăncău. It was reported that at least two drones, which presumably struck the area close to the airfield with explosives, flew over the village. An hour later, the incident was repeated.

=== Military reserve in Vladimirovca ===
On 5 June, at 5:10, a drone launched two explosives, most likely RGD-5 grenades, over the parking area of the fleet vehicles of a military reserve unit in Vladimirovca. It was announced by the Transnistrian authorities the next day and no victims or material damage were reported. A criminal case was initiated after the event.

=== Failed attacks ===
On 3 May, at 02:00, a drone with 2 kilograms (4.4 pounds) of plastic explosives and 5 litres (1.1 imperial gallons; 1.3 US gallons) of Molotov cocktail liquid flew over the Maiac transmitter. Its objective would have been a second attack from a far distance over the complex, more specifically against its cooling system, which would have disabled the plant. This was stopped by Transnistrian border guards.

On 5 May, Transnistrian television channel TSV reported that residents of Pervomaisc reported hearing shots near the Cuciurgan power station under Transnistria's control. The shots would have been within Ukraine's borders, in the village of Pavlivka. Ukraine had previously announced that it would hold military exercises near that area. Sandu quickly condemned the incident after its report.

== Reactions ==
=== In Transnistria ===
Transnistrian deputy Andrei Safonov told TASS "the shelling of the building by a grenade launcher is an attempt to sow panic and fear," asserting that "attempts to put pressure on us have been observed before". Following the attacks, it was announced that the Transnistrian army had been put on maximum alert.

On 27 April, during an interview by the Russian news agency Interfax, the Minister of Foreign Affairs of Transnistria Vitaly Ignatiev talked about the attacks and proposed ending the Transnistria conflict with Moldova by signing a "final comprehensive peace treaty" where mutual non-aggression is guaranteed.

=== In Moldova ===
The day after the first explosions, Moldova's president held an extraordinary meeting of the Supreme Security Council. The Moldovan government has ordered increased patrols and border controls, including at the Transnistrian border, and has increased security alert levels at critical infrastructure facilities. On the other side, the Transnistrian authorities have raised the terroristic threat level to "red" and established checkpoints in the capital.

Moldovan president Maia Sandu said the "escalation attempts stem from factions from within the Transnistrian region who are pro-war forces and interested in destabilising the situation in the region."

=== Elsewhere ===
Following the attacks the Russia's deputy foreign minister Andrei Rudenko hinted at an invasion of Moldova, saying he would "like to avoid such a scenario" in which Moscow was required to intervene, but that "certain forces" had created "a hotbed of tension". The leader of the self-proclaimed Donetsk People's Republic Denis Pushilin told that Moscow should "take into account what is happening in Transnistria" when planning the next stage of its military campaign.

TASS reported President of Transnistria Vadim Krasnoselsky saying that Ukraine was suspected to have been behind the attack. The Ukrainian Foreign Ministry said that the explosions were part of a plan by Russia to occupy Southern Ukraine in order to establish a land bridge between Transnistria and the Crimea, during the invasion of Ukraine.

The Ministry of Foreign Affairs of Romania condemned the attacks and expressed its support to Moldova and Sandu. As a result of the attacks in Transnistria, calls from figures in Romania such as the Romanian historian Marius Oprea or entities like the party Alliance for the Union of Romanians (AUR) were made to unite Moldova and Romania to avoid Russian aggression on the former. The former Prime Minister of Moldova, Iurie Leancă, also talked about this possibility. The Minister of National Defence of Romania, Vasile Dîncu, expressed worry for the situation in Transnistria, although he declared that the conflict had no chance of further development. On 28 April, the Romanian politician Marcel Ciolacu announced that Moldova and Romania would hold a meeting on a parliamentary meeting in one or two weeks in the context of the attacks in Transnistria. Moldova and Romania are two countries closely related by culture, history and language. It has thus been theorized that a new war in Transnistria could see Romanian involvement, which is especially notable considering that Romania is a NATO member. During the Transnistria War between Russian-backed Transnistria and Moldova in 1992, Romania supported Moldova with military advisors, volunteers and weaponry.

On 26 April, during the 2022 Ramstein Air Base meeting, the U.S. Secretary of Defense Lloyd Austin declared that he was "not really sure what that's all about, but it's something that we will stay focused on".

On 26 April, Ukrainian presidential adviser Oleksiy Arestovych said during an interview that Moldova was a close neighbor to Ukraine, that Ukraine was not indifferent to it and that Moldova could turn to Ukraine for help. He also declared that Ukraine was able to solve the problem of Transnistria "in the blink of an eye", but only if Moldovan authorities requested the country's help; and that Romania could also come to Moldova's aid as "they are in fact the same people", with the same language as he continued, even though "there are many Moldovans who would not agree with me". Moldova officially let down this suggestion from Ukraine, expressing its support only for a peaceful outcome of the conflict. Furthermore, Dmitry Peskov, then the Kremlin Press Secretary of Russia, called Arestovych's words "rather provocative".

The Prime Minister of Spain Pedro Sánchez, who planned to visit the Prime Minister of Moldova on 28 April afternoon and the Prime Minister of Poland on the next day, cancelled both visits following the explosions in Transnistria.

The Israeli Foreign Ministry advised all Israelis in Transnistria to leave immediately and issued a travel warning for the area. The Ministry of Foreign Affairs of Bulgaria also recommended Bulgarian citizens to flee from Moldova. The citizens of Canada, Germany, France and the United States were also advised to leave Moldova by the authorities of their countries, and so did the Ministry of Foreign Affairs of Latvia recommend its citizens to leave Transnistria. On the other hand, the Prime Minister of Romania Nicolae Ciucă said it was not necessary for Romanian citizens to do this after analyzing the situation.

The Minister of Foreign Affairs of South Ossetia, a breakaway state from Georgia, condemned the explosions in Transnistria, saying that "such criminal acts are aimed at intimidating the civilian population and creating a pretext to aggravate the situation" and that they endangered the civilians of the area and the stability of the region.

== Aftermath ==
Following the attacks some Transnistrian residents reported receiving text messages on controversial topics such as the possibility of a referendum on reuniting with Moldova. There were also unverified reports that men under 60 would be banned from leaving the country, as in Ukraine following the onset of the war. The president of Transnistria denied these rumours about the situation on his Telegram feed. Some Transnistrians also received texts purporting to be from the Ukrainian armed forces claiming an attack was imminent.

Many people living in Transnistria started crossing into government-controlled Moldova after the explosions.

Following the events in Transnistria, the Information and Security Service of the Republic of Moldova reported that the Russian hacking group Killnet had launched a series of cyberattacks against websites of Moldovan official authorities and institutions. Some days before, this group had orchestrated similar attacks on Romanian websites.

Writing for the think tank Institute for the Study of War, Will Baumgardner concluded that the late April bombings were "likely a false flag operation executed by the Kremlin intended to draw Transnistria into its invasion of Ukraine". Baumgardner concluded that the attacks were unsuccessful, noting that Transnistria did not join the war, and that after the first few months Transnistria was very calm, with a complete absence of further attacks. One possible reason that the false flag attacks did not succeed is that influential Transnistrian Viktor Gushan's interests did not align with Russia.

On 17 March 2024, Transnistrian state press released a video allegedly showing a helicopter in a military unit in Tiraspol being attacked by a kamikaze drone. The Bureau for Reintegration of the Republic of Moldova claimed the attack was a simulated incident and that the video showed evident signs of montage. It also stated that "the incident was deliberately provoked with the aim of creating panic and maintaining tension in society on both banks of the Dniester".

Later, on 5 April 2024, a Transnistrian minister announced that another drone attack had taken place at the former airfield in Vărăncău, targeting a radio communication station, which suffered minor damage, with no casualties reported. Moldova's Bureau for Reintegration reacted by stating that provocations in the region were aimed at "sowing panic and constant tension", while Andriy Yusov, the press representative of Ukraine's Main Directorate of Intelligence, denied any involvement from Ukraine, as the country "would not waste valuable drones on such petty provocations" as he declared.

== See also ==
- 2006 Tiraspol bombings
