= List of countries without an airport =

This is a list of countries (sovereign states) and territories without an airport.

== Sovereign states ==
Of the world's countries, only six have no airport within their boundaries, though all of them have at least one heliport. All of them, except for Monaco and Palestine, are landlocked. (Liechtenstein is doubly landlocked.)

Country	Notes
Andorra	Andorra has no airport, but has three private heliports, one of which is a hospital helipad. A "National Heliport" is planned to be built, but as of 2018, the process is stalled. By both population and land area, it is the third-largest country that does not have an airport. In Spain, the nearest airports are Andorra–La Seu d'Urgell Airport (12 km away), Lleida–Alguaire Airport and Girona–Costa Brava Airport. In France, the nearest airports are Carcassonne Airport and Perpignan–Rivesaltes Airport. The nearest major airports are Josep Tarradellas Barcelona–El Prat Airport in Spain and Toulouse–Blagnac Airport in France, which are the most common choice for long-distance travel to Andorra.
Liechtenstein	Liechtenstein has no airport, but has a heliport in the southern town of Balzers. The nearest airports are St. Gallen–Altenrhein Airport in Switzerland and Friedrichshafen Airport in Germany, which have few scheduled flights. The nearest major airport is Zürich Airport in Switzerland, which has rail services to Buchs and Sargans. From these towns, one can catch a postal bus or a train to Liechtenstein.
Monaco	Monaco has no airport, but has Monaco Heliport in the district of Fontvieille. The nearest major airport is Nice Côte d'Azur Airport in France.
Palestine	While there are four airports within the State of Palestine, none have been operational since 2004. There are heliports in the cities of Ramallah, Tulkarm, Bethlehem, and Jenin.
San Marino	San Marino has no airport, but has one heliport in Borgo Maggiore and a small airfield called Torraccia airfield in Torraccia with a 680-metre (2,230-foot) grass runway. The nearest airports in Italy are Federico Fellini International Airport in Rimini, and the much larger Bologna Guglielmo Marconi Airport.
Vatican City	Vatican City has no airport, but has Vatican City Heliport in the western corner, which is used by visiting heads of state and Vatican officials. The small land area of 0.49 km^{2} (0.19 sq mi) would make it challenging to fit in an airport. The nearest major airports in Italy are Ciampino–G. B. Pastine International Airport and Leonardo da Vinci–Fiumicino Airport, both serving the city of Rome.

== States with limited recognition ==
Country	Notes
Sahrawi Arab Democratic Republic	While there are several airports within Western Sahara, all of them are in the Moroccan-controlled portion of the territory except for a dirt airstrip near Tifariti.
South Ossetia	
Transnistria	While there are three airports within Transnistria, none of them have scheduled passenger service on commercial airlines.

== Non-self-governing territories ==
Of the world's 17 non-self-governing territories, two have no airport within their boundaries: Tokelau and the Pitcairn Islands. Both are remote island groups, so a fairly long boat trip is the only way to get there.

Territory	Sovereign state	Notes
Tokelau	New Zealand	Tokelau (Note: Tokelau is a territory of New Zealand in the southern Pacific Ocean consisting of the atolls of Atafu, Nukunonu, and Fakaofo. A referendum held in 2006 and 2007 to change the status of the islands to one of free association with New Zealand did not meet the needed threshold for approval.) does not have an airport, so boats are the only means of travel and transport. The nearest airport is Faleolo International Airport serving Apia on Upolu Island in Samoa. From Apia, the Tokelau government operates the MV Mataliki passenger ship with a journey time of 24-32 hours on a fortnightly schedule.
Pitcairn Islands	United Kingdom	The Pitcairn Islands (Note: Pitcairn Islands is a British Overseas Territory in the southern Pacific Ocean consisting of four islands: Pitcairn, Henderson, Ducie, and Oeno.) do not have an airport or seaport; the islanders rely on longboats to ferry people and goods between ship and shore through Bounty Bay. The nearest airport is Totegegie Airport on Mangareva Island in French Polynesia. From Mangareva, the Pitcairn government operates the MV Silver Supporter passenger ship with a journey time of approximately 32 hours on a weekly schedule.
Tristan da Cunha	United Kingdom	Tristan da Cunha is a constituent territory of the British Overseas Territory of Saint Helena, Ascension and Tristan da Cunha, which are isolated islands in the southern Atlantic Ocean. While Saint Helena and Ascension Island now both have airports, Tristan da Cunha does not. The island is served by 3 ships chartered by the Tristan da Cunha government that regularly travel between Tristan da Cunha and Cape Town, South Africa.
