= Alexander Lebed 1996 presidential campaign =

- Campaign: 1996 Russian presidential election
- Candidate: Alexander Lebed; Vice-chairman of the Congress of Russian Communities; Member of the State Duma (1995-96); Second-in-Command of the Russian Airborne Troops; Commander of the 14th Guards Army (1992-1995); Commander of the 106th Guards Airborne Division (1988-91)
- Affiliation: Congress of Russian Communities/Honor and Motherland
- Status: Nominated by KRO: 11 January 1996; Registered: 19 April 1996; Lost election: 16 June 1996

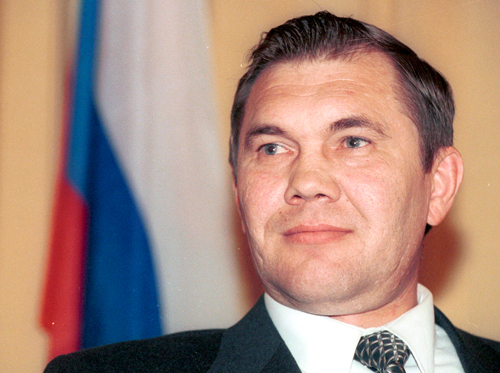

The Alexander Lebed presidential campaign, 1996 was General Alexander Lebed's campaign in the 1996 Russian presidential election. Lebed ran as the nominee of the Congress of Russian Communities (KRO). Although Lebed came in at a surprisingly strong third place in the first-round of the election, his failure to finish in the top two disqualified him from the second round. He endorsed Boris Yeltsin in the second-round. Yeltsin's victory, which surprised Western analysts, paved the way for his Prime Minister, Vladimir Putin, to rise to power.

== Background ==
Since he was among the military figures most popularly liked amongst the Russian public, Lebed had been speculated as a potentially strong presidential candidate since as early as 1994.

By 1994 Lebed had arisen as a top critic of Yeltsin.

In June 1995, after he had been relieved of his command of the 14th Army, Lebed resigned from the military and entered the realm of politics. He soon joined and became vice-chairman of the Congress of Russian Communities. The party was a centrist nationalist party headed by Yury Skokov, a military industrialist, and guided by Aleksandr Solzhenitsyn.

In September 1995 Lebed was polling as the most popularly liked politician amongst Russian citizens. He particularly benefited from his perceived separation from the political establishment, as well as the corruption associated with it. Polls showed him likely to win in the pending presidential election.

Lebed had refused to, until after the 1995 legislative election concluded, discuss whether or not he intended to run for president.

== Campaign ==
Initially after announcing his campaign, Lebed had the support of Congress of Russian Communities party leader Skokov. However, a rift arose between them. Nevertheless, Lebed was able to win the support of other party leaders, securing the party's nomination as his Skokov would later be voted out as party chairman in May.

Lebed was formally nominated by the KRO on January 11, 1996. Lebed also ran as the nominee of a new party he founded named Honor and Motherland which he built as a campaign organization separate from KRO.

Up until early May, Lebed entertained negotiations with Grigory Yavlinsky and Svyatoslav Fyodorov to jointly form a third force coalition.

Lebed's campaign had a weak grassroots presence in many locations. For instance, in the city of Perm his campaign's field office operated out of a cubicle-sized space and was headed by a retired military major with no political experience.

After reaching an informal agreement with Yeltsin in April (under which Lebed promised to endorse Yeltsin in the second round of the election), Lebed began to see positive news coverage, as well as a greater overall quantity of media coverage. This was done as part of an effort by Yeltsin's camp to promote Lebed in the hopes that he would syphon off votes from other nationalist candidates in the first-round.

In his campaign speeches, Lebed rarely attacked his opponents.

== Positions and policies ==
Lebed promoted himself as an authoritative leader that would introduce law and order, tackle corruption and allow capitalism to blossom. He had praised the leadership of Augusto Pinochet. While he presented an authoritarian personality, he held some moderate positions.

Lebed mourned the collapse of the Soviet Union.

Lebed argued in defense of Russia's control over the Transnistrian enclave.

Lebed pledged to end the war in Chechnya. During his presidential campaign he was strongly critical of the decision to send troops into Chechnya.

Lebed was skeptical towards the west, particularly towards the United States. He had warned that a potential central-European enlargement of NATO could be enough to warrant the start of a third world war. Lebed alleged that the west was "attempting to turn Russia into a cheap supplier of raw materials, a reservoir of free labor, and a huge hazardous waste dump for the industrial world." Lebed argued that since, "everybody is wiping their feet on Russia ... Russia has to show her teeth."

While he was regarded to be a pro-democracy candidate, Lebed had skeptical past credentials in regards to his history with supporting democracy.

Lebed had a problematic history with respect to human rights. He had demonstrated that he personally regarded violence to be a means of persuasion, and had acted accordingly while a general. In the years leading up to the dissolution of the Soviet Union, Lebed was involved in military efforts to suppress ethnic unrest. This included, in the spring of 1989, an effort to quash unrest in Georgia in which more than twenty people were killed and dozens wounded when spetsnaz troops commanded by Lebed used sapper shovels and chemical weapons on crowds. In the winter of 1990, Lebed carried out orders to impose martial law in the Azerbaijani capital of Baku by using armored personnel carriers to transport troops who shot, stabbed to death, and crushed hundreds of Azerbaijanis. Lebed recanted on his previous use of force in this manner, reflecting that, "I know for sure that constitutional order cannot be restored by using air force, tanks and artillery. We used military power in Tbilisi, Baku, Vilnius. Where are they today-Georgia, Azerbaijan, Lithuania? Everything we tried to keep by force was lost. Now everything is being done in order to lose Chechnya."

Lebed was also known to brag about his use of aggressive military force. As commander of the 14th Army he had once threatened to capture the Romanian capital city of Bucharest in just seven hours.

Lebed argued in support of maintaining the 14th army presence in Moldova.
