= Yusov =

Yusov (Russian: Юсов) is a Slavic masculine surname, its feminine counterpart is Yusova. Notable people with the surname include:

- Andriy Yusov (born 1983), Ukrainian activist and politician
- Dmytro Yusov (born 1993), Ukrainian football midfielder
- Vadim Yusov (1929–2013), Russian cinematographer and professor
