= Serghei Stroenco =

Moldovan footballer (1967–2013)

Personal information
- Date of birth: 22 February 1967
- Place of birth: Moldavian SSR
- Date of death: 24 December 2013 (aged 46)
- Place of death: Vladimirovca
- Height: 1.80 m (5 ft 11 in)
- Position: Defender

Senior career*
Years	Team	Apps	(Gls)
1984–1985	Avtomobilist Tiraspol	32	(5)
1986	Tekstilschik Tiraspol	30	(8)
1987	SKA Odesa	32	(1)
1988–1989	Tekstilschik Tiraspol	71	(25)
1990–1991	Tiras Tiraspol	33	(4)
1991–2001	Tiligul Tiraspol	297	(30)
2001–2002	Zimbru Chișinău	14	(0)
2002–2003	Agro Chișinău	18	(0)
2003–2009	Tiligul Tiraspol	153	(1)
Total		680	(74)

International career^{‡}
1992–2007	Moldova	46	(0)

Managerial career
- 2010–2011: Academia UTM Chișinău
- 2011–2012: Zimbru Chișinău
- * Club domestic league appearances and goals as of 4 May 2013 ‡ National team caps and goals as of 10 September 2008

Serghei Stroenco (22 February 1967 – 24 December 2013) was a Moldovan professional footballer and manager. Serghei Stroenco has played a record number of 445 games in Moldovan National Division. He died in Vladimirovca at the age of 46 on 24 December 2013.

== International career ==
Stroenco has made 46 appearances for the Moldova national football team.

== Honours ==
=== As player ===
Tiligul Tiraspol

- Divizia Națională

Runner-up (6): 1992, 1992-93, 1993-94, 1994-95, 1995-96, 1997-98

- Moldovan Cup (3): 1992–93, 1993–94, 1994-95

Runner-up (2): 1992, 1995-96

=== As coach ===
Zimbru Chișinău

- Divizia Națională

Third place (1): 2011-12

- Moldovan Cup

Quarter finals (1): 2011-12

== Other facts ==
Serghei Stroenco was one of the 11 Moldovan football players challenged and beaten by Tony Hawks and features in his book Playing the Moldovans at Tennis.
