= Mikhail Gorbachev 1996 presidential campaign =

1996 presidential campaign of Mikhail Gorbachev

- Campaigned for: 1996 Russian presidential election
- Candidate: Mikhail Gorbachev; Leader of the Soviet Union and General Secretary of the Communist Party of the Soviet Union (1985–1991); President of the Soviet Union (1990–1991); Chairman of the Supreme Soviet (1989–1990); Chairman of the Presidum of the Supreme Soviet (1988–1989)
- Affiliation: Independent

Mikhail Gorbachev, a former president of the Soviet Union and General Secretary of the Communist Party of the Soviet Union, ran in the 1996 Russian presidential election. Gorbachev's candidacy was beset by the obstacles of both minimal media coverage and a high level of disdain towards him amongst the Russian populace. Gorbachev's candidacy ended in defeat during the first round of the election. The effort was the first and only electoral campaign of Gorbachev's post-Soviet political career.

== Background ==
Gorbachev had led the Soviet Union from March 1985 until its dissolution. Following the dissolution of the Soviet Union in December 1991, Boris Yeltsin (whose rise to power Gorbachev had tried to prevent) became the Russian head-of-state. Gorbachev had reportedly been contemplating a political return since sometime in the middle of 1993. Gorbachev was still a vigorous and opinionated man. He desired to escape from his political exile and to repair his image. Gorbachev was also motivated, amid chaotic reform efforts by Yeltsin, by a belief that he could implement far superior and less disastrous reform than Yeltsin. Gorbachev also had a strong personal animosity towards Yeltsin. All of these factors motivated him to run for president. Apart from being the leader of the Communist Party of the Soviet Union during the 1990 Russian legislative election, Gorbachev lacked previous involvement in electoral campaigns. His 1996 presidential campaign effort would be his first time campaigning for office in a direct popular election.

== Campaigning ==
On 1 March 1996, Gorbachev published an open letter outlining the need for an alternative to the candidacies of Yeltsin and the Communist Party of the Russian Federation (CPRF) leader Gennady Zyuganov. He announced his candidacy the following day, marking the first time he had campaigned for a democratically elected office. Gorbachev resented both the incumbent independent Yeltsin and Zyuganov, who were the front-runners in the election. Gorbachev regarded the CPRF and Yeltsin as being the two forces that thrust him out of power, and encouraged his supporters to abstain from voting in a second round if it were to be between those two candidates.

Gorbachev believed that with a majority of Russians being dissatisfied with both front-runners, there was a viability for a third candidate, and viewed himself to be a suitable individual to fill that role. Upon announcing his campaign, Gorbachev proclaimed that, despite polls showing him having immense unpopularity, he would be able to win as the leader of a democratic coalition. He called for all democratic forces to unite and form a wide coalition, indicating his readiness to lead such a grouping. He argued that there would be immense consequences for an election that merely presented the "false choice" between Yeltsin and the CPRF, and declared: "What they are offering is not a democratic future for Russia. That is why we must unite." Gorbachev clarified that he intended to run even if such a coalition failed to materialize. A spokesperson for democratic political figure Grigory Yavlinsky indicated that with Gorbachev's unpopularity, such a coalition was, "not very realistic". Yavilinsky also unsuccessfully attempt to form such a third force coalition with the campaigns of Alexander Lebed and Svyatoslav Fyodorov.

Despite his unpopularity and low poll numbers, Gorbachev was quickly able to collect signatures. At a campaign appearance in Saint Petersburg, less than a month after declaring his candidacy, he announced that he had finished collecting more than the one million signatures needed to register his candidacy. Gorbachev soon after turned in more than 1.4 million signatures, officially registering his candidacy. His candidacy was officially certified by the Central Election Commission on 13 April 1996. During the course of his candidacy, Gorbachev, accompanied by his wife Raisa Gorbacheva, traveled the country to deliver stump speeches. Gorbachev regularly encountered hecklers. Gorbachev once responded to hecklers by exclaiming: "I will fight to the bitter end, even if you crucify me. I am reminded of Jesus Christ on the way to Golgotha, how he walked through the streets and people spit on him." Gorbachev also frequently faced hasselers, and many times was spat on by individuals.

On the stump, Gorbachev defended his record, arguing that he had tried to save the Soviet Union but that he had been betrayed by both Communist hardliners and an ambitious Yeltsin. He additionally placed blame on the 1991 Soviet coup attempt for undermining his efforts to preserve the Soviet Union. In his speeches, Gorbachev often referred to himself in third-person. He spent most of his time on the campaign trail criticizing Yeltsin. Rather than being devoted to Gorbachev's candidacy, many audience members at Gorbachev's campaign events were motivated to attend out of the pure curiosity of seeing such a historically significant individual. At the end of April 1996 while in Moscow, Gorbachev delivered a speech in which he strongly criticized Yeltsin, accusing him of using illegal means to retain power. Gorbachev argued that Yeltsin had broken the law by creating an election committee consisting of serving government officials. He also stated having the involvement of the chief of Independent Television in the president's reelection committee posed a threat to freedom of the press, that he had held talks with those seeking to form a third force coalition, and that he would be willing to step aside for a stronger candidate.

=== Incidents ===
In April 1996, while campaigning in Omsk, a man struck Gorbachev. The incident was deemed by the press to have been a slap, while Gorbachev insisted that it was an assassination attempt. Gorbachev alleged that the man was a special forces agent and had been attempting to deliver a fatal blow to his neck. The perpetrator was arrested. The Liberal Democratic Party of Russia (LDPR), at the time led by Vladimir Zhirinovsky, proposed legislation to grant the man amnesty. Boris Finko, the sponsor of the bill, declared: "He did what many dream of." Gorbachev alleged that the LDPR had been responsible for the incident, which he continued to refer to as an assassination attempt.

On Victory Day, Gorbachev paid visit to Volgograd (formerly Stalingrad). He was met by hostile crowds, some of which jeered him with chants deriding him as a "traitor". As he tried to place flowers at the city's war memorial, Gorbachev was confronted by Viktor Anpilov and a group of Anpilov's supporters. They condemned Gorbachev for his role in the collapse of the Soviet Union, and held signs which read "No Place for Traitors on the Holy Ground of Stalingrad". Anpilov tried to get Gorbachev's wife to take flowers from him, and mocked her and her husband for being "rude ingrates" when she refused them. During a campaign trip through Saint Petersburg, local officials refused to allow Gorbachev to embark on visits that he had planned to take to three factories, with the officials telling Gorbachev that the factories were closed to visitors.

== Level of support ==
Since leaving office, Gorbachev had become a celebrated figure in the West, receiving much credit for his role in peacefully ending the Cold War. At the same time, Gorbachev had become a loathed figure in Russia, receiving blame for the collapse of the Soviet Union. Upon declaring his intent to run, Gorbachev polled at a mere 1 percent, and ultimately failed to subsequently build a greater level support. Opinion polling showed Gorbachev having immense unpopularity amongst the Russian people.

Many Communists blamed him for the collapse of the Soviet Communist party and the Soviet Union itself. Many market reform supporters blamed him for failing to finish reforms, plunging the Russian economy into chaos. Others disapproved of his candidacy, fearing he would do little more than split the anti-communist vote by playing the role of a spoiler. Even Gorbachev's hometown of Privolnoye greeted his candidacy with a cold reception. In Privolnoye, The New York Times quoted Mariak Gopkala, a second-cousin of Gorbachev, as expressing her support for the candidacy of Zyuganov, declaring that Gorbachev "has already been President ... He's retired, let him rest ... He's tried to do good, of course, but they wouldn't let him. Now it's time for a younger, stronger man to take over."

Gorbachev blamed the public's animosity towards him on a conspiracy between the CPRF, Yeltsin's government and the media, which he alleged both was trying to silence him and was pushing what he alleged was a false narrative that blamed the end of the Soviet Union on him. Gorbachev argued that his low approval rating was a fabrication of a government plot against him and insisted that he enjoyed a much greater level of support than was reflected in opinion polling.

Gorbachev expressed confidence in his prospects, declaring: "I will not lose if they are genuinely free elections. I have a good chance of getting there, I feel it. But even if I am not elected, if there are free elections Gorbachev will still have won, for this is what Gorbachev was fighting for." Other than Gorbachev himself, relatively nobody believed him to have any chance of succeeding in his campaign. By some accounts, not even Gorbachev's own campaign team had much faith in his prospects. Weeks before the election, Gorbachev's wife reportedly had begun selling gowns that she had worn as the first lady of the Soviet Union, declaring that she did not believe she would be needing them again. In addition to having an outright lack of popular support, Gorbachev also lacked the financial support to mount a competitive campaign.

== Media coverage ==
Gorbachev's campaign was given almost no national or local coverage. The rare coverage he received generally involved embarrassing incidents on the campaign trail. Gorbachev endured this lack of coverage throughout his candidacy. Izvestia failed to report on his initial declaration of candidacy, while evening news broadcasts gave it only a passing mention. Gorbachev received such little media coverage that many were unaware he was even running.

At a press conference announcing his platform, Gorbachev criticized his lack of press coverage. He implored journalists to provide fair coverage to all candidates. Remarking on the lack of fair press, he argued that media manipulation by Yeltsin was as severe as the media manipulation that the Soviet government oversaw during Leonid Brezhnev's leadership, saying: "I think the situation is much worse than in the years of Perestroika. We are watching the presidential campaign of a single candidate." At one point, Gorbachev complained that there was less press freedom than when he was leader of the Soviet Union.

== Political positions ==
Gorbachev described himself as a social democrat. This was in diametric contrast to Zyuganov, who strongly rebuked any implications of being a social democrat, and whose policies eschewed social democratic stances. Gorbachev asserted that, of those running for president, his was the voice of responsibility and moderation.

=== Domestic affairs ===
Without many specifics, Gorbachev pledged to increase industrial and agricultural production and to reform taxation. One of his top stated priorities was to reign in government corruption. Another top priority of his was to ramp-up the nation's "war on crime". As leader of the Soviet Union, Gorbachev had desired to implement more gradual reforms in an effort to preserve the country's socialism while providing a democratization of its society. This contrasted with many of the reforms that Yeltsin had implemented, which sought rapid change and disregarded the country's socialist structure. Gorbachev hoped that, if elected, he would be able to halt course and implement his own, more mild, vision of reforms. He hoped to create a social-democratic state structure in Russia.

=== Military and international affairs ===
One of Gorbachev's top stated priorities was to put an end to the war in Chechnya. In early 1996, commenting on the expansion of NATO, Gorbachev had declared that Russians viewed NATO as "a war machine that is trying to take advantage of our troubled political and economic situation."

== Results ==
Gorbachev cast his own vote on election day, 16 June 1996. He declared that he had voted for "the most worthy candidate". He spent the night of the election in Moscow with the company of Alexander Haig. Haig was in Moscow as part of an election monitoring team. Gorbachev received 386,069 votes (0.5 percent of the overall vote), placing seventh out of eleven candidates, and was therefore eliminated from campaigning in the second round of the election. Gorbachev did not deliver a concession speech after the results of the election came in.

== Aftermath ==
Gorbachev subsequently questioned the validity of the election results. While he acknowledged that he had lost by a significant margin, Gorbachev suspected that his actual vote count still exceeded what was reported in the official tally. In 2017, Gorbachev wrote in his book The New Russia that "there have been no fair and free elections in Russia since those of 1989, 1990 and the election of 1991 when Boris Yeltsin became the first president of Russia."

== See also ==
- Boris Yeltsin 1996 presidential campaign
