= Third force (1996 Russian presidential election) =

Proposed political alliance in the 1996 Russian presidential election

Third force, in relation to the 1996 Russian presidential election, refers to the possibility of a center-left third party voting bloc being formed in order to create a viable alternative to Boris Yeltsin and Gennady Zyuganov.

Serious negotiations to form a coalition were held between candidates Alexander Lebed, Grigory Yavlinsky and Svyatoslav Fyodorov. Alexander Rutskoy and Stanislav Govorukhin were approached to join the coalition, but gave their support to Zyuganov. Mikhail Gorbachev offered to lead a wide coalition but gained little support. Talks ultimately fell apart by early May, six weeks before the first round of the election. It was later revealed that Lebed had made a secret agreement with Yeltsin to support the latter in the second round of the election, after building up Lebed's campaign so that his endorsement would carry more support.

== Background ==
Polls in early 1996 had demonstrated that the majority of voters did not like either Boris Yeltsin or Gennady Zyuganov. As a result, there was a real possibility that that support could coalesce around a third candidate, propelling them into the second round of the Russian presidential election. Many referred to this possible merging of support as a "third force". Intense speculation arose that a third force might arise from a coalition of non-Yeltsin supporters and non-Communist supporters.

Speculation of a third force largely centered on a potential united bloc led by Alexander Lebed, Grigory Yavlinsky and Svyatoslav Fyodorov. Independently, none of their presidential candidacies stood a chance of making it to the second round. However, united, they believed that not only might they be able to retain the combined 15.5% of the vote that their parties had garnered in the 1995 legislative elections, but that they could also win a portion of the additional centrist voting population (which would be around 20 to 25% of the electorate). Even if it had only been able to garner half of the additional centrist voting population, combined with their existing 15.5% of support, it was thought to be enough to propel a united ticket into the second round of voting Hypothetical polling for the second round showed that both Lebed and Yavilinsky would be capable of defeating either Yeltsin or Zyuganov.

== Developments ==
=== Winter 1996 ===
On January 27, 1996, in his speech officially accepting Yabloko's nomination, Yavlinsky included overtures to Lebed. Yavlinsky stated that discussions about forming a coalition were underway with both Yegor Gaidar's party Democratic Choice of Russia and Lebed's party Congress of Russian Communities. At the time, Sergei Kovalev, a former Yeltsin ally who had recently sided as a strong critic of the president, remarked that Yavlkinsky's proposal for a coalition with Congress of Russian Communities was a risky proposition.

At the same time, Ella Pamfilova (Duma deputy and the head of the Common Cause bloc) sought to convene a congress of all rightist, right-of-center and centrist parties and movements in order to nominate a united democratic candidate for president. The congress was to form a coalition consisting of groups from as far left as the Women of Russia and the Russian Union of Industrialists and Entrepreneurs to groups as far right as Democratic Choice of Russia. Pamfilova argued for such unification, stating, "The Communists are uniting; Zhirinovskyites have rallied to the party of power. Our only possible option today is to unite." Pamfilova claimed to have heard interest from both Yavlinsky and Gaidar.

The central issue that arose in negotiations for forming a third-force coalition between Lebed, Yavlinsky, and Fyodorov was determining which two would withdraw from the race to support the other. Each believed that they would be the strongest candidate. Proponents of a third force coalition discussed a number of means of deciding this, including holding a primary election or selecting the candidate with the highest public opinion ratings. However, none of these satisfied all three candidates. Efforts at negotiating stalled by early March, unable to agree on either a leader or a platform. They also lost some members, such as Alexander Rutskoy, to the Communists. A smaller group of leaders from that effort later regrouped to form a new third force group and hold new negotiations. This group consisted of Lebed, Svyatoslav Fyodorov, and Yavlinsky.

On March 15, Fyodorov announced that he had conducted high-level discussions with both Lebed and Yavlinsky about forming a coalition. He promised that they would, in the near future, be releasing a joint statement about, "the Brezhnev-Stalinist socialism of the Communists and the wild west capitalism of Yeltsin." He also claimed that the group would announce what candidate it would run by May 15, and that a primary-type system might be used to determine who it would be. Reportedly, Lebed was in favor of such a system, and Fyodorov was beginning to lean in favor of it, while Yavlinsky was remained skeptical of it. The following day, the three candidates released a joint statement condemning the Duma's denunciation of the Belovezh Accord. At the time, Fedorov claimed that the group was now drawing up a joint economic and political platform to be released.

At the start of March, after three-party negotiations had stalled, Lebed and Fyodorov proceeded without Yavlinsky with a tentative agreement to work alongside Alexander Rutskoy and Stanislav Govorukhin to form a third force coalition. Zyuganov, unsuccessfully, tried to convince these parties to support his campaign. While Zyuganov failed to persuade either Lebed or Fyodorov to support him, he did manage to successfully entice Rutskoy and Govorukhin into throwing their support behind his candidacy, quickly eliminating their involvement with third-force efforts.

Upon entering the race in early March, Mikhail Gorbachev proclaimed that, despite polls showing he had immense unpopularity, he would be able to win as the leader of a democratic coalition. He called for all democratic forces to unite and form a wide coalition, and indicated his readiness to lead such a group. He claimed that there would be immense consequences for an election that merely presented the, "false choice" between Yeltsin and Communists. Gorbachev declared, "What they are offering is not a democratic future for Russia. That is why we must unite." However, a spokesperson for Yavlinsky indicated that with Gorbachev's unpopularity, such a coalition was, "not very realistic". Nevertheless, later in March, after announcing that he had collected the required signatures to officially register as a candidate, Gorbachev reiterated the need for voters to have a third option to serve as an alternative to Yeltsin and Zyuganov, and refused to rule-out forming a coalition with Fydorov or Yavilinsky.

=== Spring 1996 ===
In mid-March, Yavlinsky declared that he would agree to withdraw his candidacy if another qualified and viable candidate entered the race. He mentioned Boris Nemtsov, who had already declined to run, as one individual that he would be willing step aside for.

By April 1996, opinion polls had placed Boris Yeltsin and Gennady Zyuganov ahead of the rest of the candidates running, essentially making the election a two-person race. However, between one third and half of the electorate still intended to vote for a candidate other than Yeltsin and Zyuganov, which indicated that a third-force coalition remained viable.

At the end of April, Gorbachev claimed that he had held talks with the "Third Force Group", and he would be willing to step-aside for a stronger candidate. However, others did not actively negotiate with him to join the proposed third-force coalition.

==== Death of negotiations ====
Throughout the spring, it had appeared to many observers that Yavlinsky and Lebed had been nearing an arrangement. Yabloko had even begun assisting Lebed in collecting signatures for his candidacy. Yavilinsky and Lebed held periodic meetings (the two met far more frequently with each other than they did with Fyodorov). However, in May, the loose coalition between them abruptly fell apart.

Unbeknownst to others, Yeltsin and Lebed met in April and reached a secret agreement. They reached a tentative understanding in which Lebed would support Yeltsin in the second round. Yeltsin believed that by building-up Lebed's candidacy, he would narrow the vote to the benefit of his own campaign. He also believed that it would help pave the way for an anti-communist alliance in the second round of the election. Media oligarch and Yeltsin-ally Berezovsky subsequently worked to provide favorable coverage of Lebed in order to build-up his candidacy. However, Lebed continued to engage in third force coalitions, partially to prevent a different third-force coalition from being pursued. Lebed would later feel betrayed when he learned that Yavilinsky had held talks with Yeltsin as well. However, Yavilinsky's had been unproductive.

Ultimately, with Lebed withdrawing from negotiations with Yavilynsky, all prospects of the third force coalition were ended, as a coalition between Fyodorov and Yavlinsky was deemed to be insufficient without the involvement of Lebed.

On May 8, Fyodorov, who had until then been willing to potentially drop out of the race for a third force coalition, indicated that he no longer was willing to withdraw. Fyodorov soon openly admitted that hopes of a third force coalition were dead.

== See also ==
- Alexander Lebed 1996 presidential campaign
- Grigory Yavlinsky 1996 presidential campaign
