= Vărăncău, Transnistria =

Vărăncău Воронко́во (Russian) Воронко́во (Ukrainian)
- Commune
- Location within Moldova
- Coordinates: 47°42′21″N 29°7′9″E
- Country (de jure): Moldova
- Country (de facto): Transnistria (Note: Transnistria's political status is disputed. It considers itself to be an independent state, but this is not recognised by any UN member state. The Moldovan government and the international community consider Transnistria a part of Moldova's territory.)
- District: Rîbnița District
- Elevation: 184 m (604 ft)

Population (2004)
  - Total: 2,942
- Time zone: UTC+2 (EET)
  - Summer (DST): UTC+3 (EEST)

Vărăncău (Ukrainian: Воронково, Russian: Воронко́во, Voronkovo, Polish: Woronków) is a commune in the Rîbnița District of Transnistria, Moldova, composed of three villages: Buschi (Буськи), Gherșunovca (Гершунівка) and Vărăncău. It is located 15 kilometres (9.3 miles) southeast of Rîbnița.

== History ==
Woronków, as it was known in Polish, was a private village of the Lubomirski family, administratively located in the Bracław County in the Bracław Voivodeship in the Lesser Poland Province of the Kingdom of Poland. Following the Second Partition of Poland, in 1793, it was annexed by Russia. In 1800 the Church of the Assumption of Blessed Virgin Mary was built. In the late 19th century, it had a population of 2,073.

The village of Vărăncău is the site of the Church of the Blessed Virgin's Assumption, a Christian Orthodox church, construction of which was completed in 1800. Since then, the church has been open and functioning, standing much as it did when it first opened its doors. It is the only church in Transnistria which was never closed during the Soviet times when all other churches had to close, holding therefore a special significance for the religious community in Transnistria.

In 1924, it became part of the Moldavian Autonomous Oblast, which was soon converted into the Moldavian Autonomous Soviet Socialist Republic, and the Moldavian Soviet Socialist Republic in 1940 during World War II. From 1941 to 1944, it was administered by Romania as part of the Transnistria Governorate.

Vărăncău also had a now abandoned military aerodrome of the former Soviet Union. The 2,500-metre (2,700-yard) long runway has today been turned into farmland. The aerodrome was repeatedly struck by drones flying over the village on 6 May 2022. This was part of a 2022 series of attacks that happened in Transnistria as the 2022 Russian invasion of Ukraine was developing. These incidents may have been a false flag operation by Russia or Transnistria itself.

On 5 April 2024, Transnistria's Minister of State Security (MGB) announced that a drone had struck a radio communication station at the former Soviet aerodrome in Vărăncău. According to the minister, the station sustained minor damage, and there were no casualties. The Bureau for Reintegration of the Republic of Moldova stated that competent authorities were analysing the images and information that had emerged, and stated that provocations in the region were aimed at "sowing panic and constant tension". For his part, Andriy Yusov, the press representative of Ukraine's Main Directorate of Intelligence, denied any Ukrainian involvement, declaring that Ukraine "would not waste valuable drones on such petty provocations".

According to the 2004 census, the population of the village was 2,942 inhabitants, of which 899 (30.55%) were Moldovans (Romanians), 1,745 (59.31%) Ukrainians and 223 (7.57%) Russians.
