= Grigory Yashkin =

Russian general

Colonel General Grigory Yashkin
- Григорий Петрович Яшкин
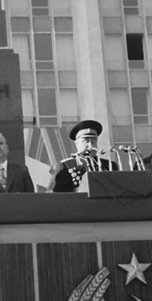
- Yashkin speaking during the golden jubilee of the Moldovan SSR.
- Born: 27 December 1922; Golodovka, Tambov Governorate, Russian SFSR
- Died: October 2003 (aged 80); Moscow, Russia
- Military career
- Allegiance: USSR; Russia
- Branch: Soviet Army; Soviet Air Defence Forces
- Service years: 1939–1987
- Rank: Colonel General
- Commands: 14th Guards Army
- Conflicts: World War II; Western Front; 1982 Lebanon War

Grigory Petrovich Yashkin (Russian: Григо́рий Петро́вич Я́шкин) was a Soviet Army colonel general and former commander of the 14th Guards Army.

== Early life and career ==
He was born in December 1922 in Golodovka, a village in the Tambov Governorate of the Soviet Union. He is the son of Pyotr Efremovich Yashkin (1902–1983) and Irina Andreevna (1900–1938). In his youth, he attended a drama school in Saransk. He joined the Red Army in 1939 at the age of 17. In 1941, he graduated from the Podolsk rifle and machine gun school and was immediately sent to the Western Front to serve in a machine gun platoon. After the war, he commanded a mechanized regiment and a separate tank brigade. In 1956, he graduated from Frunze Military Academy. In the mid-1960s, he served as deputy commander of the 31st Tank Division. In October 1969, he was the commander of the 44th Rifle Corps of the Transbaikal Military District, during which he presided over the stationing of troops in the Mongolian People's Republic as a result of the Sino-Soviet split and Sino-Soviet border conflict.

In 1972, he completed higher level courses at the Voroshilov Academy of the General Staff of the USSR. He returned to Mongolia in May 1970 to serve in the 39th Army of the Far Eastern Military District before returning to the USSR a year later to serve as commander of the 14th Guards Army in Odessa Military District, serving from 30 November 1971 to 4 December 1975. In this position, he effectively had jurisdiction over all units in the Moldovan SSR. From December 1975 - Deputy Commander of the Odessa Military District for Combat Training - Head of Troop Training, since November 1978 Deputy Commander-in-Chief for Combat Training - Head of the Combat Training Directorate of the Group of Soviet Forces in Germany.

From 1980–1984, he advised the Syrian Army as part of the Group of Soviet Military Specialists in Syria (Russian: Группа советских военных специалистов в Сирии) during the course of the 1982 Lebanon War. During his time in Syria, he survived 2 attempts on his life, including an explosion at his headquarters in Damascus in October 1981. During his term as Deputy Head of Civil Defense of the USSR from 1984–1987, he oversaw the recovery process in the aftermath of the Chernobyl disaster in the Ukrainian and Byelorussian SSRs.

After retirement, he actively participated in public activities and has since served as the Chairman of the Russian Union of Veterans of the Armed Forces and the First Deputy Chairman of the Russian Committee of War and Military Veterans. He was also a member of the Presidium of the Coordination Council of the All-Russian public movement “People’s Patriotic Union of Russia”. He died in October 2003 at the age of 80 and was buried at Troekurovskoye Cemetery in Moscow. He is survived by his wife and daughters Svetlana and Elena.

== Awards and honors ==
- Promoted to Major General (23 February 1967)
- Promoted to Lieutenant General (2 November 1972)
- Promoted to Colonel General (16 December 1982)
- Order of Friendship
- Order of Lenin
- Order of the Red Banner
- Order of the Patriotic War
- Order of the Red Banner of Labour
- Order "For Service to the Homeland in the Armed Forces of the USSR"
- Medal "For the Defence of Moscow"
- Freedom of the city (Podolsk, Ostrava and Karviná)
