= Tiraspol Airfield =

Airfield in Tiraspol, Transnistria

Tiraspol
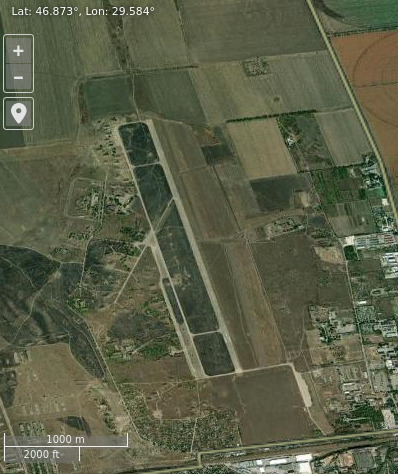
- Satellite imagery of Tiraspol airfield

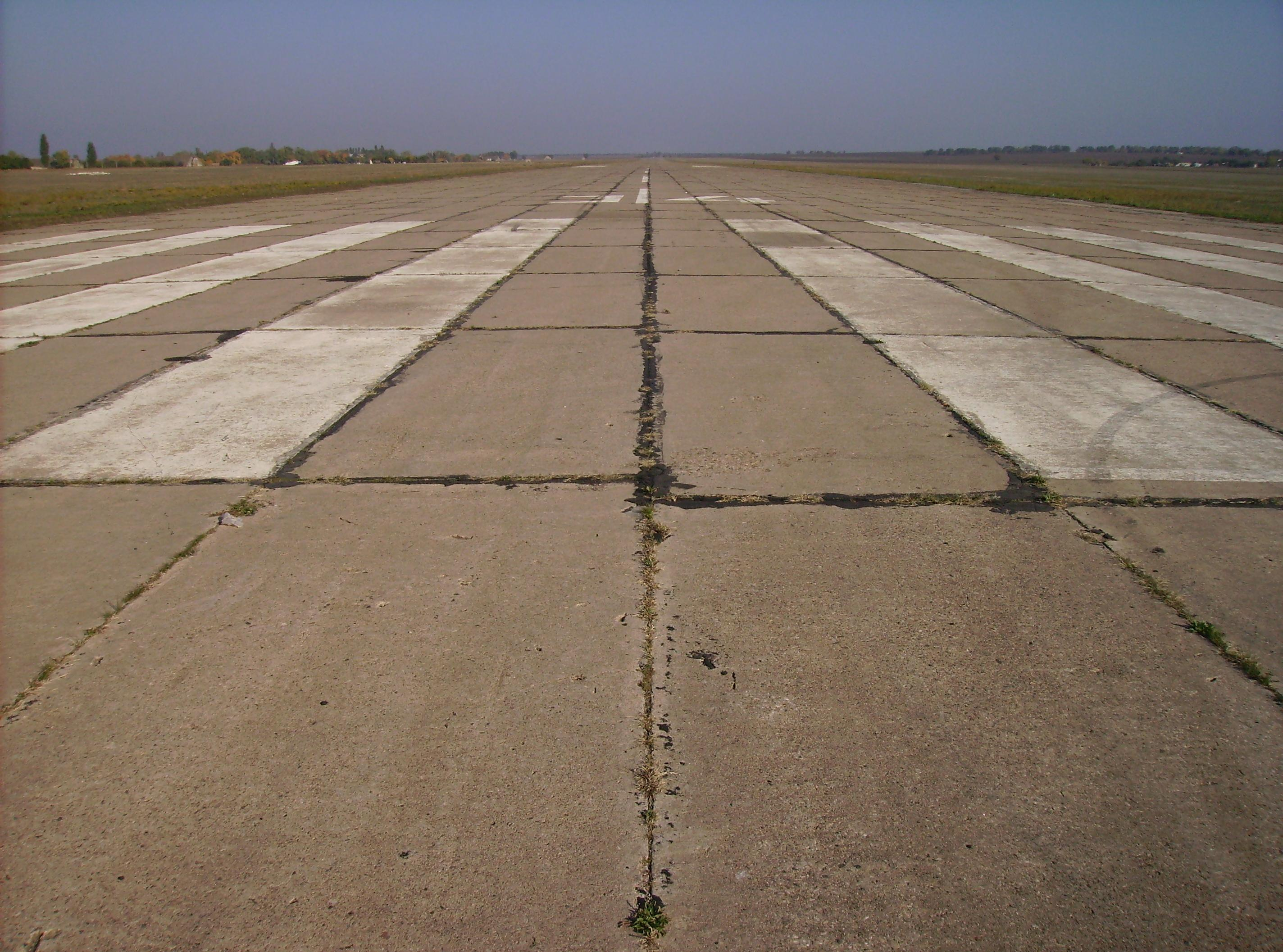
- IATA: none; ICAO: LUTR

Summary
- Location: Tiraspol, Transnistria
- Time zone: +2 (EET)
  - Summer (DST): +3 (EEST)
- Elevation AMSL: 36 m (118 ft)
- Coordinates: 46°52′21″N 29°35′04″E

Map
- Location of the airport in Transnistria Location of the airport in Moldova Location of the airport in Europe

Runways
Direction	Length		Surface
Direction	m	ft	Surface
16/34	2,500	8,202	Concrete

Tiraspol Airfield (Note: Romanian: Аеродромул Тираспол, romanized: Aerodromul Tiraspol, Russian: Тирасполь аэродром, romanized: Tiraspol' aerodrom, Ukrainian: Тирасполь аеродром, romanized: Tyraspolʹ aerodrom) (ICAO: LUTR) is an airfield located in Tiraspol. It previously served as a military air base.

== History ==
Until 1989, it was used as a military airfield of the Soviet Air Forces.

Until 2012, car races were held at the airfield. The airfield was used for training before the 2 September and Victory May parades.

In October 2012, then Transnistrian President Yevgeny Shevchuk announced his intention to create a civilian airport in Tiraspol on the territory of a military airfield. The head of the delegation of the State Duma of Russia, Sergei Gavrilov, confirmed that the reconstruction would be paid with funds provided by Russia. In the same year, the runway was restored before the arrival of Russian military specialists.

On October 23, 2012, a Russian Antonov An-72 aircraft landed in Tiraspol, marking the first flight since 1998. On October 25, 2012, the aircraft flew to Chișinău.

On May 10, 2016, Transnistrian President Shevchuk confirmed the intention to transform the Tiraspol airfield into a civilian airport, but indicated that "neither Moldova nor Ukraine are ready to give the appropriate permissions to transit through their territory or turn around through their territory."

=== 2022 attack ===
Following an attack on the security ministry building earlier in the same day, at 23:30 on 25 April 2022, the airport was attacked from the air, possibly by a drone strike; two explosives had been dropped on the air base of the airfield. The windows and hood of a ZIL-131 truck were damaged. There also were reports on that day that a military unit of the Armed Forces of Transnistria had been attacked near Parcani. The Transnistrian authorities did not officially confirm the explosions in the Tiraspol Airport, which were initially reported by Moldova. It was later clarified that both reports referred to the same event at the air base in Tiraspol.

=== 2024 attack ===
On March 17, unknown actors launched a drone at Tiraspol airbase, with a video being released of an attack on a stationary Mi-8 helicopter, and subsequent pictures of what appear to be wreckage of a helicopter. Transnistrian sources claimed that the attack was backed by Ukraine, while the Moldovan Bureau of Reintegration stated that the helicopter that was struck had not flown in years. The Russian Ministry of Foreign affairs spokesperson claimed that the strike was by Ukrainian forces to cause panic among Russian voters. The attack came amidst ongoing tensions between Russia and Moldova over Transnistria.

== See also ==
- List of airports in Transnistria
