= Parcani, Transnistria =

Parcani Паркань (Moldovan Cyrillic) Парка́ны (Russian) Паркани (Ukrainian)
- Commune
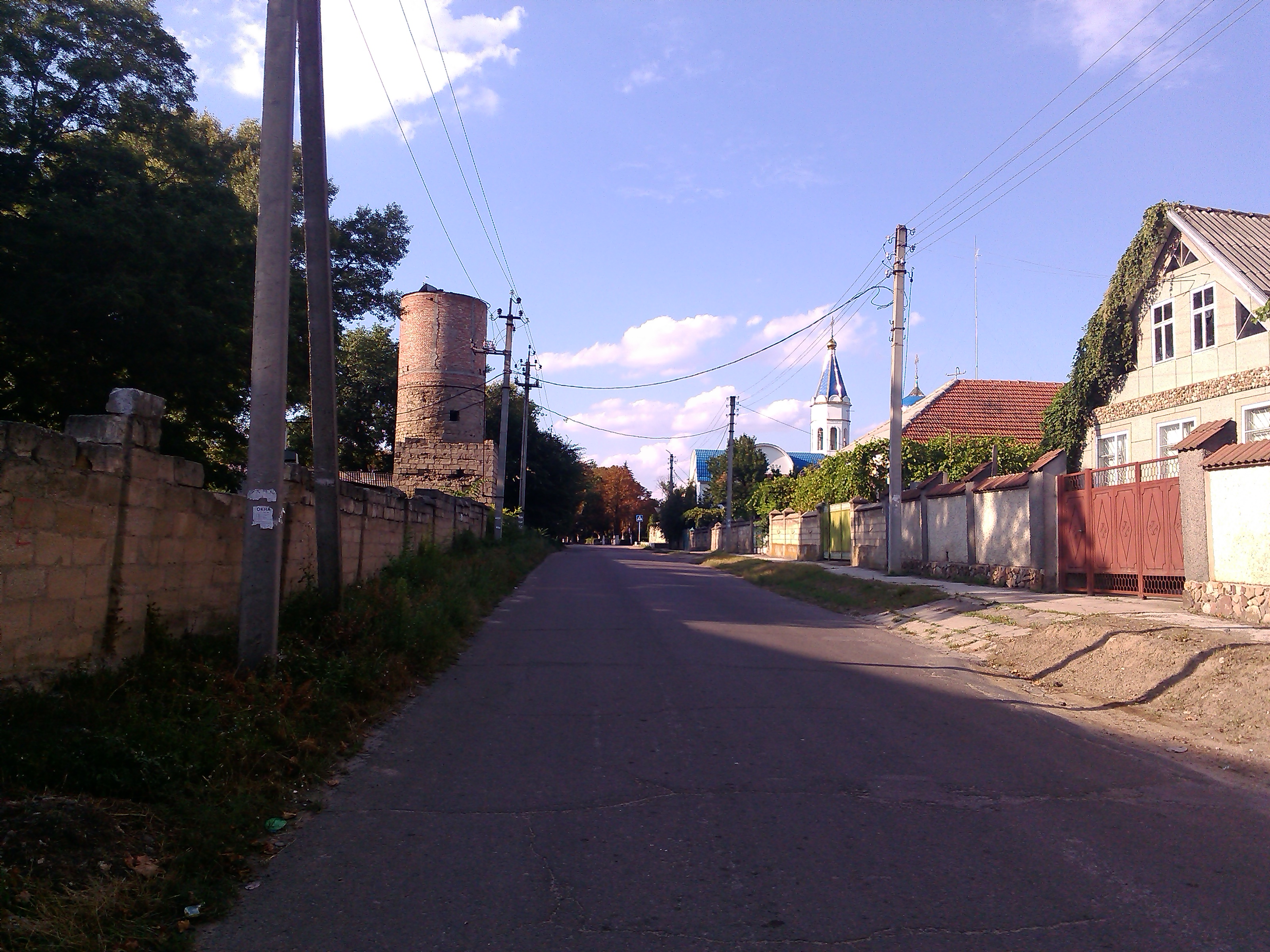

- Location within Moldova
- Coordinates: 46°50′20″N 29°30′59″E
- Country (de jure): Moldova
- Country (de facto): Transnistria (Note: Transnistria's political status is disputed. It considers itself to be an independent state, but this is not recognised by any UN member state. The Moldovan government and the international community consider Transnistria a part of Moldova's territory.)
- Elevation: 17 m (56 ft)
- Time zone: UTC+2 (EET)
  - Summer (DST): UTC+3 (EEST)

Parcani (Moldovan Cyrillic: Паркань; Bulgarian: Паркани, Parkani; Ukrainian: Паркани, Parkany; Russian: Парка́ны, Parkany) is a large commune and village in the Slobozia District of Transnistria, a de facto independent entity within the internationally recognized borders of Moldova. The village has a population of around 10,500, of whom 95% are ethnic Bulgarians (Bessarabian Bulgarians). The first Bulgarian colonists arrived in the village in the early 19th century. According to some sources, it is the largest Bulgarian-majority village outside the borders of Bulgaria. A monument to Bulgarian national hero Vasil Levski was unveiled in Parcani in September 2008.

The village lies between Tiraspol and Bender; it is serviced by the trolleybus line between the two cities.

Reports of an attack on a military unit of the Armed Forces of Transnistria near Parcani appeared on 25 April 2022. It was later clarified that these reports referred to an attack that had occurred on that day on the Tiraspol Airport. This incident was part of a series of attacks of unknown authorship that occurred in Transnistria in that year during the Russian invasion of Ukraine, which may have been a false flag operation by Russia or Transnistria itself.

According to the Soviet census of 1939, the population of the town was 7,363 inhabitants, of which 111 (1.51%) were Moldovans (Romanians), 6,614 (89.83%) Bulgarians, 373 (5.07%) Russians and 230 (3.12%) Ukrainians.

According to the 2004 census, the population of the commune was 10,543, of which 824 (7.81%) were Moldovans (Romanians), 1,180 (11.19%) Ukrainians, 1,668 (18.82%) Russians and 6,648 (63.05%) Bulgarians.
