= Cobasna ammunition depot =

Military weapons deposit in Cobasna, part of Moldova but under Transnistrian control

- Near Cobasna in Moldova
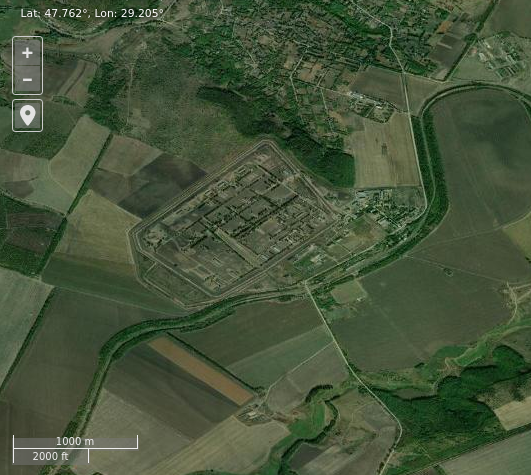
- Satellite imagery of the Cobasna ammunition depot

Location
- Location of the arsenal in Transnistria Location of the arsenal in Moldova Location of the arsenal in Europe
- Coordinates: 47°46′34″N 29°12′24″E

The Cobasna ammunition depot, formally the 1411th Artillery Ammunition Depot (Romanian: Depozitul de muniții de artilerie nr. 1411; Russian: 1411-й артиллерийский склад боеприпасов, romanized: 1411-y artilleriyskiy sklad boyepripasov), is a large ammunition depot located in the village of Cobasna. Legally and internationally recognized as part of Moldova as a whole, the unrecognized breakaway state of Transnistria controls the village and the ammunition depot and has denied access to international observers, an exception being the Russian military forces located in the region ever since the end of the Transnistria War in 1992. Outside access to the ammunition depot is effectively prohibited. Only the Russian and Transnistrian authorities have detailed information regarding the amount and state of the stored weapons.

== History ==
=== 20th century ===
The ammunition depot's Military Unit Number is 72431. The original directive for the establishment of the depot was issued by the Red Army General Staff on 28 July 1941. In accordance with this directive, the depot was established in Kungur, now in Perm Krai, Russia, on 11 August of the same year. Starting from 30 January 1942, during World War II, the depot supplied Red Army units and formations of the Volkhov Front in Budogoshch, Kharkiv, Kirovohrad, Kremenchuk, Moscow, Oryol, Poltava and Vyshny Volochyok. From July 1945 to May 1949, the depot was located in Voznesensk, now in Mykolaiv Oblast, Ukraine. Since May 1949, it is hosted in its current location in Cobasna. Until January 1992, the ammunition depot was subordinated to the Odessa Military District, forming part of the 14th Guards Army from then to April 1995 and since then being part of the Operational Group of Russian Forces (OGRF). The core of the OGRF consists of 70 to 100 Russian officers, with the rest being Transnistrian locals employed as soldiers. Troops of the OGRF are rotated once every six months, although Moldova and Ukraine have been blocking further rotation attempts ever since 2022. The OGRF is around 1,500 troops-strong.

=== 2000–2013 ===
The Cobasna ammunition depot has been referred to as one of the largest if not the largest ammunition depot in Eastern Europe and contains up to 20,000 tons of Soviet-era weapons from the 14th Guards Army of the USSR and also from the former states of Czechoslovakia and East Germany. There have been several attempts and calls to withdraw both the weapons from the Cobasna ammunition depot and the Russian soldiers from Transnistria. During the 1999 Istanbul summit, Russia promised to completely withdraw its weapons and soldiers. Some progress was made, but following a request from the Transnistrian authorities asking Russia to maintain its army, the process stopped in 2003. On the same year had the Kozak memorandum been proposed. It aimed to resolve the Transnistria conflict by reintegrating Transnistria into Moldova with veto powers while keeping an increased Russian military contingent stationed in Transnistria for fifteen more years. It was rejected at the last minute by President of Moldova Vladimir Voronin reportedly following protests from the Organization for Security and Co-operation in Europe (OSCE), the European Union and the United States.

=== 2014–2020 ===
Ever since Russia's armed conflict with Ukraine began in 2014, there has been growing distress in Moldova about the Cobasna ammunition depot, with some believing that the weapons there could be used in a potential future military conflict. Additionally, the Academy of Sciences of Moldova determined in 2015 that an explosion of the weapons located in the ammunition depot, which passed their expiry date long ago, would be equivalent to the atomic bombings of Hiroshima and Nagasaki. Concern for such an event increased following the 2020 Beirut explosion.

As of 2017, Russia maintains its military presence in Transnistria and in the ammunition depot, with Russia having been accused of using the latter as a method of geopolitical blackmail against Moldova.

=== 2020s ===
Moldova continues to insist on the need to evacuate the weapons from Cobasna, with official declarations coming from the current President of Moldova Maia Sandu since 2021. On 11 August 2021, Sandu met with the then Deputy Chief of Staff of the Russian Presidential Executive Office Dmitry Kozak and discussed several important issues in the bilateral relations between both countries, including the Transnistria conflict and the situation of the Cobasna ammunition depot. Regarding the latter, Kozak showed willingness to cooperate with Moldova to destroy the weapons at the depot and declared that it was within Russia's interests to do this. The then President of Transnistria, Vadim Krasnoselsky, also expressed support to the initiative.

On 27 April 2022, the Ministry of Internal Affairs of Transnistria reported that drones flew over Cobasna and that shots were fired on the village. The ministry claimed that the drones came from Ukraine. Several attacks had recently occurred in Transnistria at the time. They occurred during the Russian invasion of Ukraine, and may have been a false flag operation by Russia or Transnistria itself.

Ukraine, already fighting against the Russian Armed Forces on multiple other fronts, has suggested several times that it is willing to drive out the Russian troops in Transnistria (including the Cobasna depot) if so requested or consented by the Moldovan government. However, as of 2025, Chișinău has maintained that a peaceful solution needs to be found, and a military confrontation is undesirable. Concerns have been expressed that any action to seize the Cobasna depot could provoke Russia, or trigger a massive explosion that could create a major ecological disaster if the ammunition stockpiles were to be accidentally or deliberately detonated. As nobody knows the state of the weapons stored in Cobasna for decades, given that the OSCE has not been granted access to monitor their condition, the probability, magnitude and consequences of an explosion are difficult to predict.
