= Operational Group of Russian Forces =

Operational Group of Russian Forces in Transnistria
- Оперативная группа российских войск в Приднестровье
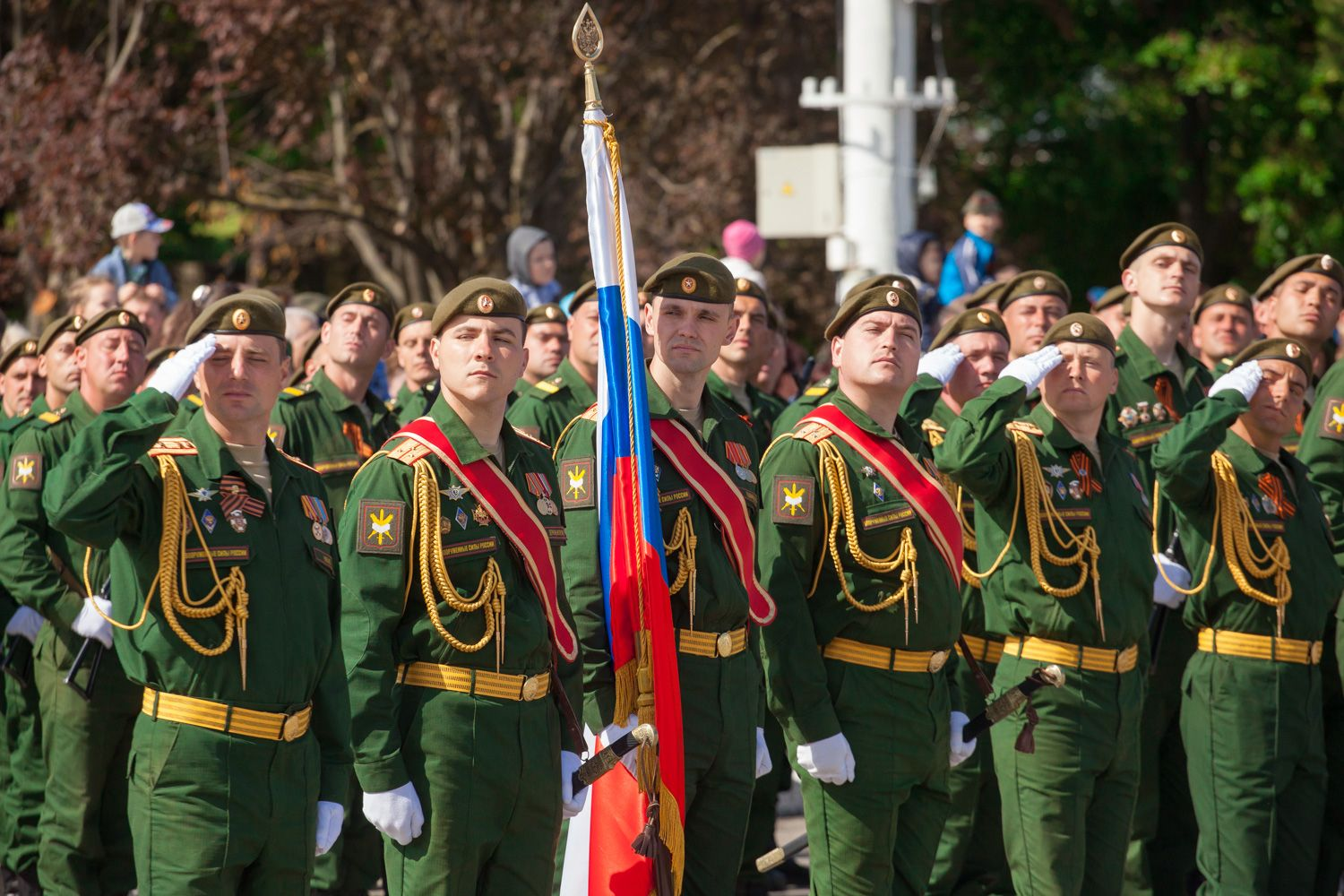
- A unit of the group parading on Suvorov Square, Tiraspol, in 2017
- Active: 1995–present
- Country: Russia
- Branch: Russian Ground Forces
- Type: Task force
- Size: c. 1,200 soldiers (June 2025, according to Russian Foreign Ministry)
- Part of: Moscow Military District
- Headquarters: Tiraspol

Commanders
- Commander: Colonel Dmitry Zelenkov

The Operational Group of Russian Forces in Transnistria (OGRF; Romanian: Grupul Operativ al Trupelor Ruse din Transnistria, GOTR; Russian: Оперативная группа российских войск в Приднестровье, romanized: Operativnaya gruppa rossiyskikh voysk v Pridnestrovye, ОГРВ) is a sizable overseas military task force of the Russian Armed Forces. It provides around 350 soldiers to the Joint Control Commission (JCC) trilateral peacekeeping force.

1,500 soldiers of the military force are based at the former decommissioned Soviet-era ammunition depot at Cobasna, where it guards around 22,000 tons of military equipment and ammunition. The core of the OGRF consists of 70 to 100 Russian officers, with the rest being Transnistrian locals employed as soldiers.

The OGRF has no legal status in Moldova, and the Moldovan authorities have been demanding its withdrawal from the country for many years. Russia committed to withdrawing the OGRF at the 1999 Istanbul summit from Moldova's territory, but it has so far failed to honour that pledge.

== History ==
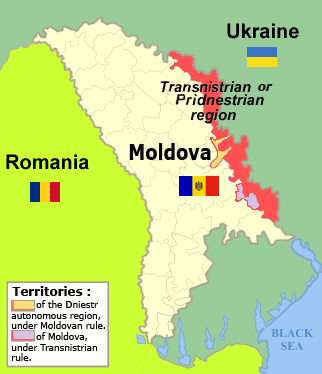
Transnistrian region of Moldova

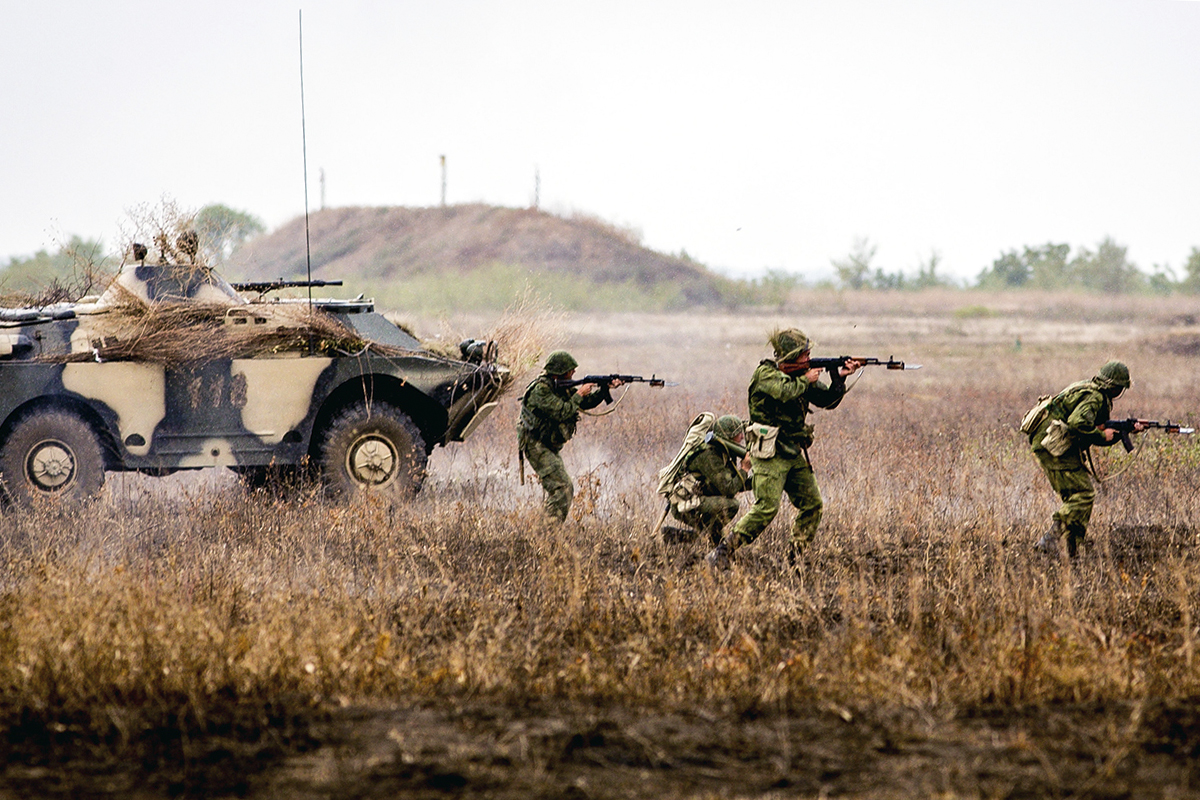
A platoon from the operational group during training.

This Russian military presence in Transnistria dates back to 1992, when the 14th Guards Army intervened in the Transnistria War in support of the Transnistrian separatist forces. Following the end of the war, which ended in a Russian-backed Transnistrian victory and in the de facto independence of the region, the Russian forces stayed in a purportedly peacekeeping mission and reorganized in 1995 into the OGRF. On 15 March 2022, the Parliamentary Assembly of the Council of Europe recognized Transnistria as Moldovan territory occupied by Russia.

Russia agreed to withdraw its 14th Army from Moldovan territory in an agreement signed 21 October 1994 and acknowledged in the December Budapest declaration of the Conference on Security and Co-operation in Europe. The OSCE expressed concern over the lack of progress in its 1996 Lisbon Document. At the OSCE Istanbul summit in November 1999, Russia again promised to withdraw its forces from Moldova (and from Georgia), this time with a firm commitment to a deadline of 31 December 2002 written into the summit documents. These promises were not fulfilled.

=== 14th Army background and Transnistria War ===
The Soviet Army's 14th Guards Army (Russian: 14-я гвардейская армия) was formed in November 1956 in Chișinău as one of the only formation of the Odessa Military District to be stationed in the Moldovan SSR. The army headquarters was moved to Tiraspol, the capital of Pridnestrovian Moldavian Soviet Socialist Republic in the early 1980s. At the start of the Transnistrian War, soldiers of the 14th Guards Army who were sympathetic to the PMR cause "defected" with total military structure and commanding system, and remained under Moscow command, and, with some assistance of the Transnistrian Republican Guard, created the strongest local military force, despite the Russian government's official declaration of neutrality. On 23 June 1992, Major General Alexander Lebed of the 14th Guards Army, who had orders to evacuate the local logistics center, began an over two week battle which ended in an artillery strike on 3 July 1992 on a Moldovan unit in a forest near Bender (Tighina). It is generally accepted that this strike led to the strategic victory of the Transnistrian/Russian military and the tactical setbacks of the military of Moldova, creating a Russian-backed entity outside of the control of the Moldovan government.

=== OGRF establishment ===
After the war, the 14th Army was split between the Ukrainian Armed Forces and the Russian Army, with most of the Russian contingent being absorbed into Western Military District. The conclusion of the conflict in a cease-fire resulted in the beginning of trilateral negotiations between the governments and militaries of Russia, Transnistria and Moldova, which eventually led to the discussion of a joint peacekeeping force. In June 1995, the Operational Group of Russian Forces in Transnistria was founded by order of the General Staff of the Russian Armed Forces. In 2005, the force consisted of the 8th Guards Motor Rifle Brigade, the 1162nd Anti-Aircraft Rocket Regiment, 15th Signals Regiment, as well as other support units.

The 14th Guards Army itself was reformed in April 1995 into the Operational Group of Russian Forces (OGRF) which came under the command of the Moscow Military District and was charged with guarding the Cobasna ammunition depot. Another more recent source gives the disbandment date of the 14th Guards Army as 25 June 1995. The 59th Guards Motor Rifle Division became the 8th Guards Motor Rifle Brigade on 1 June 1997.

According to Kommersant-Vlast in 2005, the force consisted of the 8th Guards Motor Rifle Brigade, the 1162nd Anti-Aircraft Rocket Regiment, 15th Signals Regiment, and other support units.

On 27 June 2016, the Transnistrian government passed new law which penalized any actions or public statements that criticize the OGRF. The punishment for committing this crime is 3–7 years in jail.

The operational group was as of June 2019 commanded by Colonel Dmitry Zelenkov of Russia and numbered 1,500 troops. It served alongside the Joint Control Commission. Around 350–400 troops with the operational force report directly to the JCC and can be assigned to it at any given time.

=== Calls for withdraw and UN resolution ===
Since its introduction, the OGRF has been met with criticism from both Moldovan and Western officials and observers, all of whom claim that the Russian military presence is either illegal or unnecessary. In November 2008, the NATO Parliamentary Assembly adopted a resolution, urging Russia to withdraw the force in accordance with its commitments at the 1999 Istanbul summit of the Organization for Security and Co-operation in Europe.

On 7 April 2016, Russia announced it would withdraw its troops from Moldova once the problem of liquidating the 14th Army's armament depots was solved. Complicating the withdrawal is the necessity to transit the armaments through Ukraine, which has had a hostile relationship after the Russian annexation of Crimea and the Russian invasion of eastern Ukraine in 2014.

On 27 June 2016, a new law entered in force in Transnistria, punishing actions or public statements, including through the usage of mass media, networks of information and telecommunications or internet criticizing the so-called peacekeeping mission of the Russian Army in Transnistria, or presenting interpretations perceived to be "false" by the Transnistrian government of the Russian Army's military mission. The punishment is up to three years of jail for ordinary people or up to seven years of jail if the crime was committed by a person of responsibility or a group of persons by prior agreement.

As of 2018, the OGRF ostensibly remains in Transnistria to guard the ammunition depot at Cobasna. In May 2018 and preceding years, the OGRF has taken part in Victory Day Parades on Suvorov Square, to the condemnation from Chișinău.

In June 2018, United Nations General Assembly adopted resolution (document A/72/L.58), which essentially called on the Russian Federation to withdraw the OGRF from Moldovan territory immediately. While the Moldovan government led by Pavel Filip supported it, President Igor Dodon condemned the resolution, saying that the Russian presence led to the "creation of conditions for a political process of negotiations".

In 2020, Moldovan president-elect Maia Sandu declared that OGRF should withdraw from Transnistria, stating that "there are no bilateral agreements on the OGRF and on the weapons depots.” She also stated that its her position that the "mission should be transformed into an OSCE civilian observer mission.”

Moldova continued to request the withdrawal of the Russian troops from Transnistria, such as in 2021. Furthermore, in 2022, amid an increase in tensions between Ukraine and Russia which served as a prelude to the Russian invasion of Ukraine, allegations by Ukrainian intelligence appeared that said Russia was trying to prepare "provocations" against the Russian soldiers in Transnistria in order to create a pretext for an invasion of Ukraine.

In 2022, as the Russian invasion of Ukraine was taking place, the Chief Directorate of Intelligence of the Ministry of Defence of Ukraine reported that residents in Transnistria were refusing to sign contracts with the Operational Group of Russian Forces despite being promised "high cash payments, social packages, and likely housing". The report also said that there were being several cases of desertion in the military unit and that there were not enough necessary resources to search for and recover soldiers. In 2022, Moldova continued blocking the rotation of soldiers with Russia and stopping new weapons being brought in, saying the soldiers are there illegally. Previously Russians had entered Transnistria via Ukraine, this issue affects the 70-100 Russian officers. Ukraine, already fighting against the Russian Armed Forces on multiple other fronts, has suggested several times that it is willing to drive out the Russian troops in Transnistria if so requested by the Moldovan government; however, Chișinău has maintained that a peaceful solution needs to be found, and a military confrontation is undesirable.

In June 2025, President Sandu alleged that, throughout her term (since December 2020), Russia had been secretly trying to insert more Russian troops in Transnistria using diplomatic passports. Russian Foreign Ministry spokesperson Maria Zakharova denied these allegations, stating that there were around 1,200 Russian soldiers stationed in eastern Moldova, and that the Kremlin had no plans to increase that number. As of October 2025, the Moldovan government's strategy for reintegration appeared to be to use economic support as a carrot, and withholding gas supplies as a stick, in order to stimulate the separatist authorities in Tiraspol to agree on Chișinău's terms for reintegration of Transnistria and the withdrawal of the OGRF. However, there was a risk of the opposite happening: all civilians could be leaving Transnistria due to increasing socioeconomic hardship, while only a subsidised Russian military base would stay behind.

On 16 April 2026, the OGRF's leadership was officially barred from entering the territory of Moldova. This affected the unit's commander Dmitry Zelenkov and his deputies Dmitry Opalev, Sergei Mashchenko and Sergei Shirshov, as well as the chief of staff Marat Yarulin and Alexei Bogomolov, the head of the field bank in Tiraspol. According to the Ministry of Foreign Affairs of Moldova, the decision was made in relation to their residence permit and not to having been declared personae non grata, as for the latter they would have needed diplomatic accreditation. Igor Grosu, the President of the Moldovan Parliament, stated "the reason is very simple and concrete: the Russian army is illegally present on the territory of the Republic of Moldova".

== Structure (as of 2015) ==
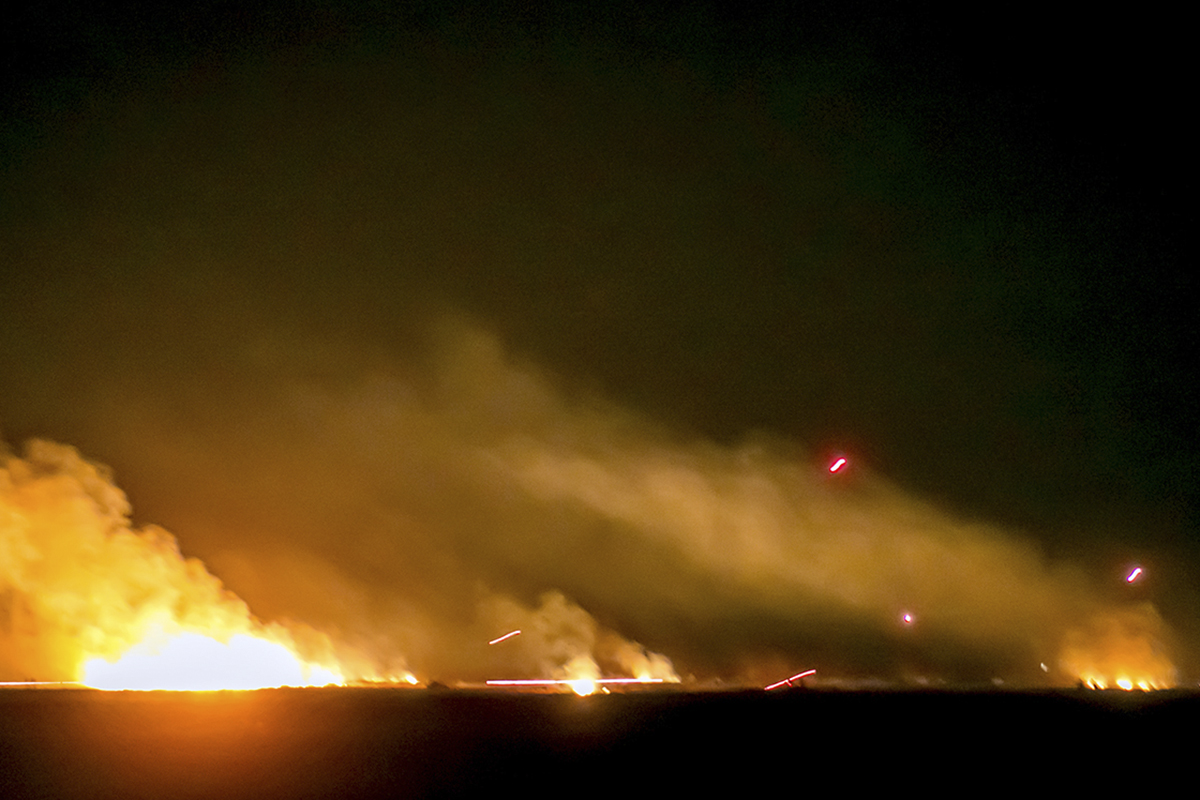
A motorized rifle battalion conducting a live fire exercise.

- Group headquarters
- 82nd Separate Guards Motorized Rifle Battalion
  - Battalion HQ
  - 4 Motorized Rifle Companies
  - Headquarters platoon
  - Grenadier Platoon
  - Technical Support Platoon
  - Material Support Platoon
  - Medical Platoon
- 113th Separate Guards Motorized Rifle Battalion
  - Battalion HQ
  - 4 Motorized Rifle Companies
  - Headquarters platoon
  - Grenadier Platoon
  - Technical Support Platoon
  - Material Support Platoon
  - Medical Platoon
- 540th Separate Command Battalion
  - Battalion HQ
  - Guard Company
    - Company headquarters
    - 4 guard platoons
    - Counterintelligence Department of the FSB
  - Communication Center
  - Field Mail Station
  - Engineering Platoon
  - Storage Department
  - Maintenance Company (equipped with MTO-AT-M1)
  - Material Support Company
  - Fuel depot
  - Military band
  - Firing range

== Commanders of the OGRF ==
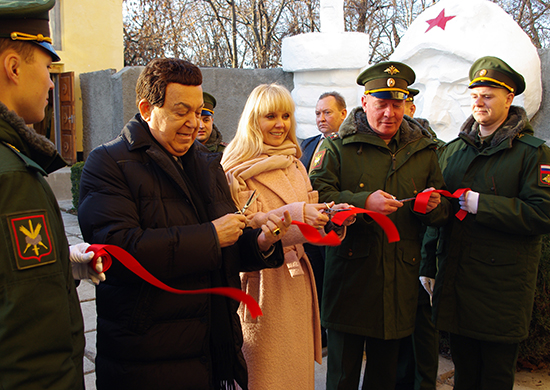
Iosif Kobzon and Colonel Dmitry Zelenkov in November 2016

The following generals commanded the unit:

- Lieutenant General Valery Evnevich (November 1995–16 January 2002)
- Major General Boris Sergeev (16 January 2002 – 11 September 2009)
- Colonel Vyacheslav Sitchikhin (11 September 2009 – 2010)
- Colonel Sergey Nyrkov (2010–2011)
- Colonel Valery Plohotnyuk (1 December 2011 – 15 March 2013)
- Colonel Sergey Goryachev (15 March 2013 – 25 December 2014)
- Colonel Dmitry Zelenkov (25 December 2014–present)

== See also ==
- List of Russian military bases abroad
- 59th Guards Motor Rifle Division
- Military history of the Russian Federation
- Moldovan neutrality
- Russian separatist forces in Ukraine
- Russian-occupied territories
  - Russian-occupied territories in Georgia
  - Russian-occupied territories of Ukraine
