= 14th Guards Combined Arms Army =

- 14-я гвардейская общевойсковая армия
- Active: 25 November 1956 – June 1995
- Country: Soviet Union (until 1991); Russia (1991–1995)
- Type: Field army
- Part of: Odessa Military District; Moscow Military District
- Headquarters: Chișinău (1956–1984); Tiraspol (1984–1995)
- Equipment: MT-LB; BTR-60
- Engagements: Warsaw Pact invasion of Czechoslovakia; Transnistria War
- Decorations: Order of the Red Banner

Commanders
- Notable commanders: Alexander Lebed

The 14th Guards Combined Arms Army (Russian: 14-я гвардейская общевойсковая армия) was a field army of the Red Army, the Soviet Ground Forces, and the Russian Ground Forces, active from 1956 to 1995. By the 1990s, according to sources within the 14th Army, the majority of its troops came from what would become the Pridnestrovian Moldavian Soviet Socialist Republic, with 51% of officers and 79% of draftees coming from this region.

== History ==
=== Formation and Soviet era ===
The 14th Army was established on 25 November 1956 from the Odessa Military District's 10th Guards Budapest Rifle Corps in Chișinău. The rifle corps took part in the Dnieper–Carpathian Offensive as part of the 5th Shock Army and the Budapest Offensive as part of the 46th Army. After the war, units of the army such as the 33rd Guards Motor Rifle Division were stationed in the Romanian People's Republic until they were withdrawn (or disbanded, in 33rd Guards MRD's case) between 1958 and 1960. On 3 November 1967, the army was renamed the 14th Guards Combined Arms Army on the orders of Marshal of the Soviet Union Rodion Malinovsky. In August 1968, one of the army's divisions, the 48th Motor Rifle Division, took part in the Warsaw Pact invasion of Czechoslovakia, joining the Central Group of Forces. The army was awarded the Order of the Red Banner on 28 October 1974, by the Presidium of the Supreme Soviet of the Soviet Union. It began to recruit Transnistrian youths for military service in the early 70s, which would later become the army's main ethnic majority. In the early 1980s, the headquarters was moved to Tiraspol, the capital of Soviet Transnistria. On 1 April 1992, the President of Russia Boris Yeltsin ordered that the 14th Guards Combined Arms Army come under the jurisdiction of the Russian Army.

=== Transnistrian War ===
At the start of the Transnistrian War in March 1992, the Russian government adopted an official policy of neutrality. Despite this, many 14th Guards Army personnel were sympathetic to the creation of the PMR and therefore defected and joined Transnistrian units and participated in the fighting as part of the Armed Forces of Transnistria. Even its own commanding officer, General G. I. Yakovlev, defected to the Transnistrian side, eventually playing a role in the republic's founding and serving as a career politician. Once he accepted the position of Chairman of the Department of Defense PMR on 3 December 1991, Yevgeny Shaposhnikov (Commander-in-Chief of the CIS Armed Forces at the time) immediately and permanently relieved him of his Russian military service. Furthermore, a considerable amount of the army's materiel was taken without resistance or given to the PMR armed forces.

Yakovlev's successor, General Yuriy Netkachev has assumed a more neutral stance in the conflict. However, his attempts at mediation between Chișinău (capital of Moldova) and Tiraspol (capital of PMR) were largely unsuccessful.

On 23 March 1992, Shaposhnikov signed a decree authorising the transfer of military equipment of 14th Guards Army units stationed on the right bank of the Dniester to the Republic of Moldova. This military equipment had constituted the majority of the materiel utilized by the Moldovan National Army in the ensuing War of Transnistria. A second decree, issued on 1 April by Boris Yeltsin, transferred the personnel of the 14th Guards Army, as well as all left-bank military equipment, including a large ammunition depot at Cobasna, under Russian control.

The number of Russian personnel of the army located in Moldova totaled about 14,000 soldiers (conscripts and officers), all of which were supported by 9,000 Transnistrian militiamen who were armed and trained by the 14th Guards Army. On 23 June, Major General Alexander Lebed arrived at the headquarters 14th Army in the Transnistrian capital under the orders from the Russian Ground Forces to inspect the army and evacuate the weapons depot.

On 3 July at 03:00, a massive artillery strike originating from the 14th Army formations stationed on left bank of the Dniester obliterated the Moldovan force concentrated in Hîrbovăț forest, near Bender, effectively ending the military phase of the conflict. According to at least one Moldovan source, 112 Moldovan soldiers were killed by the bombardment. This was considered to be the conflict's climax which ultimately resulted in the end of the conflict's military phase and the beginning of trilateral negotiations between Russia, Transnistria, and Moldova.

=== Disbandment ===
After the war, the unit's number of personnel was reduced dramatically, with subordinate units were split between the Armed Forces of Ukraine and the Armed Forces of Russia. The units that remained were reformed into the Moscow Military District's Operational Group of Russian Forces in Moldova between April–June 1995. This was done at the behest of the General Staff of the Russian Armed Forces. It is generally accepted by the Military of Moldova and the Government of Transnistria that the 14th Army played a critical role in preventing the installation of Moldovan control in the area. Many veterans of the former Russian 14th Army were given local residence in and around Tiraspol.

== Structure ==
=== 1960–1989 ===
The following divisions were assigned to the 14th Army in 1960:

- 59th Guards Motor Rifle Division (Tiraspol)
- 86th Guards Motor Rifle Division (Bălți)
- 88th Motor Rifle Division (Belgorod-Dnestrovsky)
- 118th Motor Rifle Division (Bolgrad)

In 1964, the 88th Motor Rifle Division became the 180th Motor Rifle Division, and the 118th Motor Rifle Division was redesignated as the 48th Motor Rifle Division.

=== 1988 ===
Source: Holm, 14th Guards Combined Arms Army.

- 59th Guards Motor Rifle Division (Tiraspol)
- 86th Guards Motor Rifle Division (Bălți) – moved to Florești, Moldova on 1 December 1989. Reportedly taken over by Moldova in February 1992.
- 180th Motor Rifle Division (Belgorod-Dnestrovsky) – taken over by Ukraine in January 1992.
- 1411th Artillery Ammunition Depot (Cobasna)

=== 1990–1992 ===
As of 19 November 1990, the 14th Guards Army consisted of the units mentioned below:

- Army Headquarters (Tiraspol)
- 173rd Missile Brigade (Bender)
- 189th Guards Missile Brigade (Bălți):
- 156th Anti-Aircraft Missile Brigade (Ungheni)
- 865th Air Defense Command Post
- 4th Artillery Regiment (Ungheni)
  - 803rd Rocket Artillery Regiment (disbanded, assets to 4th Artillery Reg)
  - 2335th Reconnaissance Artillery Regiment (disbanded, assets to 4th Artillery Reg)
- 714th Separate Reconnaissance Artillery Battalion (Ungheni)
- 36th Separate Helicopter Squadron (Tiraspol)
- 321st Separate Squadron of Unmanned Reconnaissance Systems (Tiraspol)
- 905th Air Assault Battalion (Tiraspol)
- 194th Pontoon Bridge Regiment, 115th Separate Engineer Sapper Battalion (Parcani)
- 15th Separate Signal Regiment (Tiraspol)
- 108th Separate Radio Engineering Regiment (Bender)
- 130th Chemical Defense Battalion, 785th NBC Reconnaissance Battalion (Bender)
- 58th Radio Engineering Battalion, 976th and 2242nd Electronic Warfare Battalions (Bender)
- 5381st Equipment Storage Base (Florești) (former 86th Guards Motor Rifle Division)
- 59th Guards Motor Rifle Division (Kramatorskaya) in (Tiraspol)
- 5775th Base for Storage of Weapons and Equipment (Bilhorod-Dnistrovsky, Odesa Oblast) formerly the 180th Motor Rifle Division

By 1991, the army was made up of the 59th Guards Motor Rifle Division, two storage bases, and other smaller units, and the 1162nd Anti-Aircraft Rocket Regiment remaining.

== Equipment ==
At its peak, the army utilized 229 tanks, 305 various armored vehicles, 328 artillery guns, mortars, and rocket launchers and 74 pieces of aviation transportation.

=== Vehicles ===
- ~60 T-64B
- 117 MT-LB
- 25 Р-R-145BM
- 2 RKhM Kashalot
- 3 UR-67
- 27 9M113 Konkurs
- 32 S-60
- 22 BTR-60
- 4 IRM

=== Artillery ===
- 36 D-30 howitzer
- 24 2A36 "Giatsint"
- 26 BM-27 Uragan
- 3 PRP-3
- 3 Klyon 1
- 2 1V19
- 5 R-145BM

=== Aircraft ===
- 2 Su-27
- 3 An-2
- 1 An-24
- 2 An-26
- 4 Yak-52
- 3 L-39
- 8 Mi-8
- 4 Mi-2
- 2 Mi-24K
- 2 Mi-24R

== Commanders of the Army ==
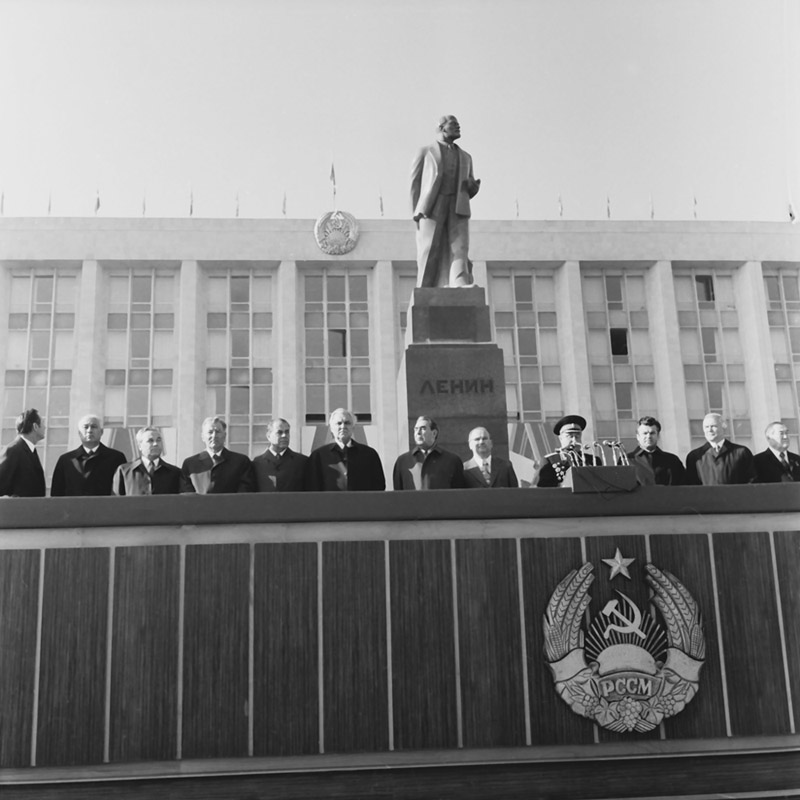
Lieutenant General Grigory Yashkin delivering an address to troops of the 14th Army on the occasion of the Moldovan SSR's golden jubilee.

The following generals commanded the 14th Guards Army:

- Lieutenant General Ivan Afonin (November 1956 – May 1960)
- Major General (promoted to Lieutenant General in May 1961) Grigory Shcherbak (May 1960 – May 1969)
- Lieutenant General Vladimir Meretskov (May 1969 – November 1971)
- Major General (promoted to Lieutenant General in November 1972) Grigory Yashkin (November 1971 – December 1975)
- Major General (promoted to Lieutenant General in October 1979) Vladimir Vostrov (December 1975 – July 1980)
- Major General (promoted to Lieutenant General in October 1981) Viktor Ermakov (July 1980 – May 1982)
- Lieutenant General Boris Tkach (May 1982 – September 1984)
- Lieutenant General Ivan Fuzhenko (September 1984 – February 1986)
- Major General (promoted to Lieutenant General in October 1987) Anatoly Sergeyev (February 1986 – 1987)
- Major General (promoted to Lieutenant General in February 1990) Gennady Yakovlev (1987 – 15 January 1992)
- Major General Yuri Netkachev (15 January 1992 – 27 June 1992)
- Major General (promoted to Lieutenant General in September 1992) Alexander Lebed (27 June 1992 – 14 June 1995)
