= Cobasna =

Cobasna Кобасна (Moldovan Cyrillic) Колбасная (Russian) Ковбасна (Ukrainian)
- Commune
- Location within Moldova
- Coordinates: 47°46′47″N 29°12′35″E
- Country (de jure): Moldova
- Country (de facto): Transnistria (Note: Transnistria's political status is disputed. It considers itself to be an independent state, but this is not recognised by any UN member state. The Moldovan government and the international community consider Transnistria a part of Moldova's territory.)
- Elevation: 152 m (499 ft)
- Time zone: UTC+2 (EET)
  - Summer (DST): UTC+3 (EEST)

Cobasna (Moldovan Cyrillic: Кобасна; Ukrainian: Ковбасна, Kovbasna; Russian: Колбасная, Kolbasnaya) is a commune in northern Transnistria, Moldova that is composed of three villages: Cobasna, Cobasna station, and Suhaia Rîbnița. It is controlled by the self-proclaimed authorities of Transnistria. It is located 2 km from the border with Ukraine, in Rîbnița District.

Cobasna is the site of a Russian, and formerly Soviet, ammunition depot known as the Cobasna ammunition depot. It has been referred to as the largest in Eastern Europe.

== History ==
Kiełbaśna, as it was known in Polish, was a private village of the Zamoyski, Koniecpolski, Lubomirski and Moszyński noble families successively, administratively located in the Bracław County in the Bracław Voivodeship in the Lesser Poland Province of the Kingdom of Poland. Following the Second Partition of Poland, it was annexed by Russia. In the 19th century, it remained a possession of Polish nobility, passing to the Jurjewicz family. In the late 19th century, it had a population of 1,167.

In 1924, it became part of the Moldavian Autonomous Oblast, which was soon converted into the Moldavian Autonomous Soviet Socialist Republic, and the Moldavian Soviet Socialist Republic in 1940 during World War II. From 1941 to 1944, it was administered by Romania as part of the Transnistria Governorate.

The majority of the original ammunition has either disappeared or has been removed from Cobasna under Organization for Security and Co-operation in Europe (OSCE) supervision. Military equipment which was impractical to remove has undergone on-site destruction as per Moldovan demands that the "weapons dump" of Transnistria be removed. In 2003, the process to remove the arms broke down when the Kozak memorandum was rejected by Moldovan president Vladimir Voronin. Today, around 22,000 tons of military equipment and ammunition reportedly remain there, guarded by Russian troops. 1,500 troops of the Operational Group of Russian Forces are stationed in the area.

On 27 April 2022, the Ministry of Internal Affairs of Transnistria reported that drones flew over Cobasna and that shots were fired on the village. The ministry claimed that the drones came from Ukraine. Several attacks had recently occurred in Transnistria at the time. They occurred during the 2022 Russian invasion of Ukraine, and may have been a false flag operation by Russia or Transnistria itself.

According to the 2004 census, the population of the village was 1,396 inhabitants, of which 334 (23.92%) Moldovans, 936 (67.04%) Ukrainians and 107 (7.66%) Russians.
