= List of airports in Transnistria =

This is a list of airports in Transnistria, sorted by location.

== Airport ==
Currently, no airport in Transnistria has scheduled passenger service on commercial airlines.

Location	ICAO	IATA	Airport name	Coordinates	Usage
Camenca	LUCM		Camenca Airport		Not operational
Tighina (Bender)	LUTG		Tighina Airport		Not operational
Tiraspol	LUTR		Tiraspol Airport	46°52′05″N 29°35′26″E	Not operational

== See also ==
- Transport in Moldova
- List of airports by ICAO code: L#LU – Moldova
- Wikipedia:WikiProject Aviation/Airline destination lists: Europe#Moldova, Republic of
