= Congress of Russian Communities =

RODINA — Congress of Russian Communities РОДИНА — Конгресс русских общин
- Abbreviation: CRC (English); KRO (Russian)
- Leader: Dmitry Rogozin
- Chairman: Aleksey Zhuravlyov
- Founders: Dmitry Rogozin; Alexander Lebed; Yury Skokov
- Founded: February 1992; 34 years ago (as Congress of Russian Communities); 9 December 2006; 19 years ago (refoundation)
- Merged into: Rodina (2004–2006), (2012-)
- Headquarters: Moscow, Russia
- Ideology: Pan-Russianism; National conservatism Traditionalism; Anti-Americanism
- Political position: Right-wing to far-right
- National affiliation: Rodina (formerly)
- Colours: Gold; Black; Before 2004: White; Blue; Red

Website
- www.kro-rodina.ru www.kro.su

Logo of the CRC before 2004

The Congress of Russian Communities (CRC, Russian: Конгресс русских общин, КРО, romanized: Kongress russkikh obschin, KRO) is a political organization in Russia. It was created in the early 1990s initially to promote the rights of ethnic Russians living in the newly independent countries of the former Soviet Union.

The group contested a number of elections to the Duma in the 1990s. In the 1995 Duma election, the group took 4.3% of the vote, just missing the 5% threshold to gain seats. In 1999 it again failed to pass the 5% threshold, although KRO candidates did win a small number of single-mandate district seats.

In 1996 Alexander Lebed used the KRO as the organisational vehicle for his campaign for the presidency. Lebed was surprisingly successful, taking 15% of the popular vote and later going on to become governor of Krasnoyarsk Krai.

In 2006 the KRO was revived by Russian nationalist politician Dmitry Rogozin following the merger of his Rodina party into a new Fair Russia coalition. Rogozin initially stated that he would turn the KRO into a political party to contest the Duma elections in December 2007.

In April 2007 Rogozin announced that he had formed a new party, the Great Russia Party, in conjunction with the nationalist Movement Against Illegal Immigration. The party would campaign for seats in the Duma and initially stated its support for Alexander Lukashenko's candidacy for the Russian Presidency, a campaign which is impossible as Lukashenko is not a Russian citizen.

== Restoration ==
On December 9, 2006, the restoration congress of the Russian communities under the new name “ Rodina (“Motherland”): Congress of Russian Communities” was held; Dmitry Rogozin is not officially included in its leadership, but he is an informal leader.

On September 21, 2011, with the participation of Dmitry Rogozin, the constituent congress of the Motherland-Congress of Russian Communities movement was held, at which the organizing committee for the restoration of the Rodina party was established. Dmitry Rogozin accused the leader of the party A Just Russia Sergey Mironov on raider seizure of the Rodina party. At the congress, Dmitry Rogozin called the Russian Communities Congress to become part of the All-Russian People's Front, created in support of presidential candidate Vladimir Putin.

In 2011, the Ministry of Justice officially registered the Congress of Russian Communities.

In April 2012, the organizing committee "Rodina Congress of Russian Communities" submitted to the Ministry of Justice of the Russian Federation a note on the restoration of the political party "Rodina".

== Electoral results ==
=== Presidential elections ===
Election	Candidate	First round		Second round		Result
Election	Candidate	Votes	%	Votes	%	Result
1996	Alexander Lebed	10,974,736	14.52%			Lost ✗
2000	Endorsed Vladimir Putin	39,740,434	52.94%			Elected ✓
2004	Party was part of Rodina/A Just Russia and did not participate in the elections					
2008	Party was part of Rodina/A Just Russia and did not participate in the elections					
2012	Party was part of Rodina/A Just Russia and did not participate in the elections					
2018	Endorsed Vladimir Putin	56,430,712	76.69%			Elected ✓

=== Legislative elections ===
Election	Party leader	Performance					Rank	Government
Election	Party leader	Votes	%	± pp	Seats	+/–	Rank	Government
1995	Yury Skokov	7,737,431	4.31%	New	5 / 450	New	8th	Minority
1999	Dmitry Rogozin	405,298	0.61%	▼5.20	0 / 450	▼5	▼12th	Minority
2003	Sergey Glazyev (NPS Rodina)	5,470,429	9.02%	New	38 / 450	New	▲4th	Minority
2007	Dmitry Rogozin	Did not participate						
2011	Dmitry Rogozin	Did not participate						
2016	Aleksey Zhuravlyov (Rodina)	792,226	1.51%	▲1.51	1 / 450	▲1	▲8th	Support
