= Vladimirovca =

Vladimirovca Владимировка (Russian) Володимирівка (Ukrainian)
- Commune
- Location within Moldova
- Coordinates: 46°50′41″N 29°49′40″E
- Country (de jure): Moldova
- Country (de facto): Transnistria (Note: Transnistria's political status is disputed. It considers itself to be an independent state, but this is not recognised by any UN member state. The Moldovan government and the international community consider Transnistria a part of Moldova's territory.)
- District: Slobozia District
- Elevation: 77 m (253 ft)
- Time zone: UTC+2 (EET)
  - Summer (DST): UTC+3 (EEST)

Vladimirovca (Moldovan Cyrillic: Владимировка; Ukrainian: Володимирівка, Volodymyrivka, Russian: Владимировский, Vladimirovskiy) is a commune in the Slobozia District of Transnistria, Moldova. It is composed of three villages: Constantinovca (Костянтинівка, Константиновка), Nicolscoe (Нікольське, Никольское) and Vladimirovca. It has since 1990 been administered as a part of the breakaway Transnistrian Moldovan Republic.

According to the 2004 census, the population of the village was 1,838 inhabitants, of which 319 (17.35%) were Moldovans (Romanians), 1,205 (65.56%) Ukrainians and 246 (13.38%) Russians.
