= Alexander Lebed =

Soviet and Russian military officer and politician (1950–2002)

- Александр Лебедь
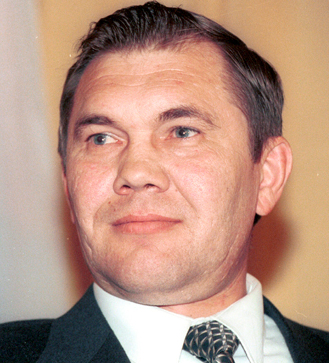
- Portrait by Mikhail Evstafiev, 1996

3rd Governor of Krasnoyarsk Krai
- In office 5 June 1998 – 28 April 2002
- President: Boris Yeltsin; Vladimir Putin
- Preceded by: Valery Zubov
- Succeeded by: Alexander Khloponin

Secretary of the Security Council
- In office 18 June – 17 October 1996
- President: Boris Yeltsin
- Prime Minister: Viktor Chernomyrdin
- Preceded by: Oleg Lobov
- Succeeded by: Ivan Rybkin

Personal details
- Born: 20 April 1950 Novocherkassk, Russian SFSR, Soviet Union
- Died: 28 April 2002 (aged 52) Abakan, Russia
- Party: People's Republican Party of Russia (after 1996); Congress of Russian Communities
- Spouse: Inna Lebed (m. 1971)
- Profession: Soldier
- Awards: Order of the Red Banner; Order of the Red Star; Order for Service to the Homeland in the Armed Forces of the USSR (2nd and 3rd class)

Military service
- Allegiance: Soviet Union (to 1991); Russian Federation
- Branch/service: Soviet Airborne Forces; Russian Airborne Forces
- Years of service: 1969–1995
- Rank: Lieutenant general
- Commands: 106th Guards Airborne Division; 14th Guards Army
- Battles/wars: Soviet–Afghan War; Transnistrian War

Lieutenant General Alexander Ivanovich Lebed (Russian: Александр Иванович Лебедь; 20 April 1950 – 28 April 2002) was a Soviet and Russian military officer and politician who held senior positions in the Airborne Forces before running for president in the 1996 Russian presidential election. He did not win, but placed third behind incumbent Boris Yeltsin and the Communist Party leader Gennady Zyuganov, with roughly 14% of the vote nation-wide. Lebed later served as the Secretary of the Security Council in the Yeltsin administration, and eventually became the governor of Krasnoyarsk Krai, the second largest Russian region. He served four years in the latter position, until his death following an Mi-8 helicopter crash.

He participated in most of Russia's military conflicts in the final decade of the Soviet Union, including the Soviet–Afghan War. From 1988 until 1991, General Lebed served as the commander of the 106th Guards Airborne Division, and later became the deputy head of the Russian Airborne Troops. The general also played a key role in the Transnistrian War between Transnistrian separatists and the Moldovan government in 1992 as the commander of the Russian 14th Guards Army, which intervened in favor of the former and occupied the region. Popular among the army, when he resigned his commission in 1995 to enter politics, Lebed was also regarded as being charismatic by the public, in contrast to other Russian politicians in the 1990s, with polls showing his popularity being ahead of Yeltsin's for some time. As the Secretary of the Security Council in the president's administration after the 1996 election he also led the negotiations that ended the First Chechen War.

Although Lebed was compared by some Western and Russian analysts to Augusto Pinochet and Napoleon Bonaparte, he was considered to be the most popular candidate for the presidential election of 2000 during the second term of President Yeltsin. After getting elected as governor of Krasnoyarsk Krai in 1998 with strong support from Anatoly Bykov, however, he decided to stay in that position and did not run for president, despite calls for him to do so. General Lebed held the position until his death in the 2002 helicopter crash.

== Early life and service ==
Alexander Lebed was born in the Cossack town of Novocherkassk, in the Rostov Oblast, in 1950. In his youth he was not a bad student but preferred boxing and chess. He grew up in poverty. His father was a carpenter who was sentenced to seven years in a Gulag labor camp for arriving late to work twice, and witnessed the Novocherkassk massacre in 1962. During that time he worked at a factory. He was determined to become a paratrooper and joined the Ryazan Guards Higher Airborne Command School in 1969, becoming a cadet platoon and company commander while he was there. In 1982, as an officer of the Soviet Airborne Forces, Lebed became a battalion commander in Afghanistan during the Soviet war there. During his time in Afghanistan, Lebed became popular with the troops under his command. He held this position until 1982 at which point he attended the Frunze Military Academy. Among his duties was being a member of the funeral department during the period of many deaths among the Soviet gerontocracy, including three Soviet rulers.

In 1988, Lebed became the commander of the 106th Guards Airborne Division. He and his troops took part in the suppression of uprisings throughout the Soviet Caucasus, in Georgia (1989) and Azerbaijan (1990), in which he refused to use brutality to put down the protestors. By 1991, Lebed held the rank of major general and became second in command of the Airborne Troops. During the 1991 coup d'état attempt by Soviet hardliners against the new Russian government, he gained fame by refusing to follow orders to lead his forces against Boris Yeltsin at the Russian White House, contributing to the coup's collapse. It was also during that time that Lebed became a rival of General Pavel Grachev, Airborne Forces commander and future Russian Minister of Defense, due to what Lebed viewed to be his misguided military reforms. Grachev would thus become his main rival. It was reportedly because of Grachev that Lebed found himself deployed to Transnistria in 1992, as commander of the 14th Guards Army. There, in the Transnistrian War between the Moldovan government and Transnistrian separatists, he intervened in favor of the latter and used his position to impose a peace agreement, also providing protection to ethnic Russians. Despite this, Lebed remained hostile to the separatist leadership, which he perceived as corrupt and stated that he was "sick and tired of guarding the sleep and safety of crooks." Nonetheless, he remained against President Boris Yeltsin's decision to withdraw most of the 14th Army from Transnistria, as he feared it would bring back chaos to the region.

General Lebed's actions in Transnistria increased his popularity among the Russian public, and Russian nationalists in particular. The event, along with his past service record, ensured that Lebed was the most popular military officer in Russia during that time, and by 1994 he was considered to be a favorite candidate for potentially running against Yeltsin in the 1996 Russian presidential election. Lebed himself described Yeltsin's performance as a "minus." Some analysts both in the West and Russia compared him to Augusto Pinochet and Napoleon Bonaparte.

== Entry into politics ==
After catching public attention with his actions in Moldova in 1992, the general came to be perceived as being an honest, anti-establishment patriot who stood against government corruption and wanted to restore order. Lebed was not necessarily in favor of democracy and had a mixed opinion of it, but did praise both Chilean dictator Augusto Pinochet—saying that Pinochet was able to revive Chile by "putting the army in first place" because "preserving the army is the basis for preserving the government"—and the French leader Charles de Gaulle.

General Lebed ended up joining the centrist, nationalistic political movement known as the Congress of Russian Communities. He retired from the army in 1995 in order to enter politics and won a State Duma seat in December of that year.

=== Presidential campaign ===
Shortly after winning a seat in the State Duma, Lebed officially launched his long-anticipated campaign for the Russian presidency in the 1996 election.

Lebed ran as a "law and order" candidate promising to curb both street crime and government corruption, as well as also promising to end the unpopular First Chechen War that had been started by President Yeltsin in 1994. For economic policy he hinted that he supported market reforms that were ongoing at the time, but remained deliberately vague.

Due to his populist rhetoric, Lebed was compared to Vladimir Zhirinovsky, but lacking the latter's aggressive nationalism. Lebed's style and personal charisma were considered to have been more important to his campaign than his political message itself. Up through May, Lebed flirted with the possibility of forming third force coalition with other candidates, however negotiations for this failed.

In the first round of the election on 16 June 1996, he came in third place behind Yeltsin and Zyuganov, with 14.7% of the vote. In exchange for Lebed's support, Yeltsin sacked his rival Defense Minister Grachev, replacing him with Igor Rodionov at Lebed's request. There was some evidence that Lebed had dealings with Yeltsin before the election ended. After the first round, Yeltsin named General Lebed as national security head by appointing him as the Secretary of the Security Council of Russia.

== Career in government ==
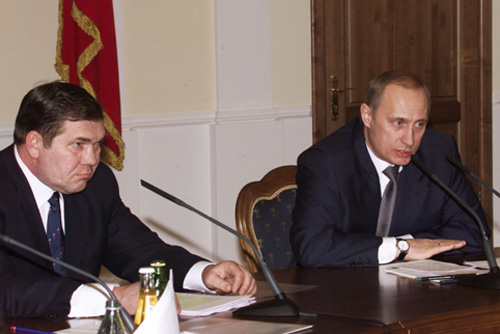
Lebed with President Vladimir Putin, 2002

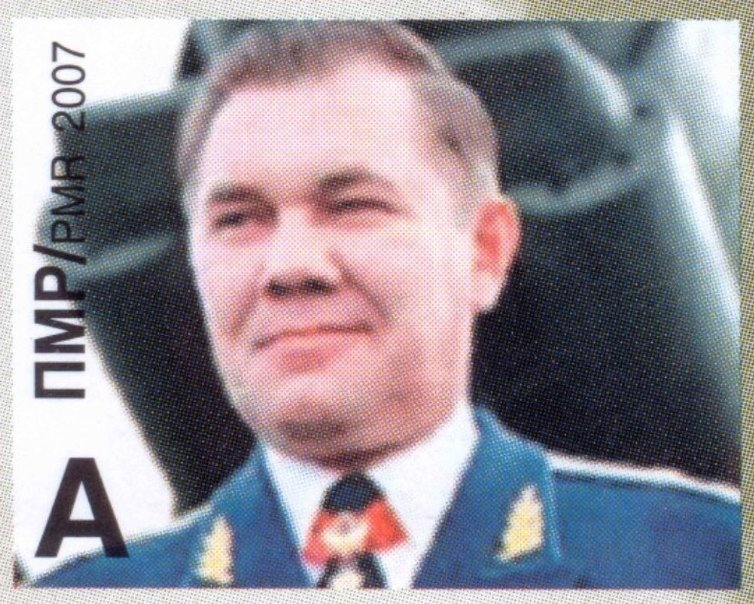
Lebed on a 2007 stamp of Transnistria

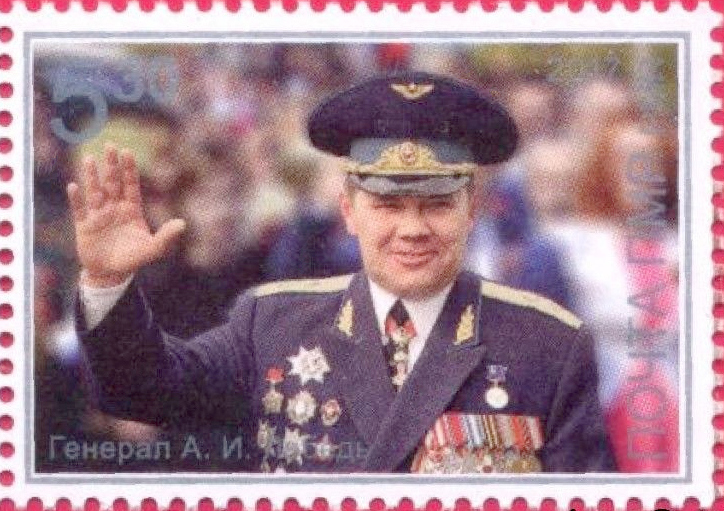
Lebed on a 2017 stamp of Transnistria

=== Chairmanship of the Security Council ===
Shortly after taking office as chairman of the Security Council, following Yeltsin's victory against Zyuganov in the July 1996 runoff, Lebed led negotiations with the Chechen President, Aslan Maskhadov. They signed agreements in the town of Khasavyurt in Dagestan which ended the First Chechen War in late August 1996. Lebed was given authority as President Yeltsin's representative and the resulting agreement became known as the Khasavyurt Accords.

However, the ending of the Chechen War by the general brought him into conflict with Minister of Internal Affairs Army General Anatoly Kulikov and his faction. He was fired from the Security Council by President Yeltsin in October 1996, following an internal conflict within the government between Lebed and a faction that included president's chief of staff, Anatoly Chubais (who was regarded as being in control of the ailing Yeltsin's administration), Prime Minister Viktor Chernomyrdin, and Interior Minister Kulikov. Yeltsin stated that he was "acting without proper authority" and Chernomyrdin accused General Lebed of "Bonapartism," while Kulikov even claimed Lebed was plotting a coup.

Chubais was also worried about the potential of Lebed becoming Yeltsin's successor, as he was the most popular member of the administration, especially after ending the Chechen war. After Chernomyrdin and Kulikov made their accusations, it caused a scandal that led to the President firing Lebed as national security chief. The general nonetheless decided to remain in politics.

=== 2000 presidential election speculation ===
After his firing, there was some indication that General Lebed intended to run for the presidency again in the 2000 Russian presidential election. His visit to the United States in January 1997 was viewed as an effort to win over American business interests as the best successor to Yeltsin, and included a meeting with Donald Trump at Trump Tower. Reportedly, he discussed potential construction projects in Moscow that Trump could be involved in. "He invited me to Russia and I accepted, I thought he was terrific," Trump said after the meeting.

One Western analyst stated about Lebed, "He may perceive that Yeltsin benefited greatly from support from the Americans in the last campaign. Bill Clinton made a trip to Moscow during the campaign. And the International Monetary Fund extended loans that enabled the Government to make credible promises to pay wages." He also visited President Clinton's inauguration while he was there, at the invitation of Senator William Roth, who made the request at the behest of an unknown businessman. Overall Lebed was said to have left a good impression on the American businessmen that he met. During that time, he was described as being the most popular candidate for the Russian presidency.

On 7 September 1997, Lebed alleged during an interview that a hundred Soviet-made suitcase-sized nuclear weapons designed for sabotage "are not under the control of the armed forces of Russia". The government of the Russian Federation rejected Lebed's claims and stated that such weapons had never been created.

=== Governorship of Krasnoyarsk Krai ===
In 1998, the general decided to run for governor of the Krasnoyarsk Krai (the second largest region in Russia), wanting to get out of the politics in Moscow after his ouster from the Yeltsin administration. He ended up winning the election for governor, defeating the incumbent Valery Zubov, despite being a complete outsider. There was speculation that he would run for the presidency in 2000, with Moscow mayor Yuri Luzhkov being projected as his main opponent at that time. However, in 2000 Lebed decided against running for president because he was satisfied with his position as the governor of Krasnoyarsk Krai.

== Death ==
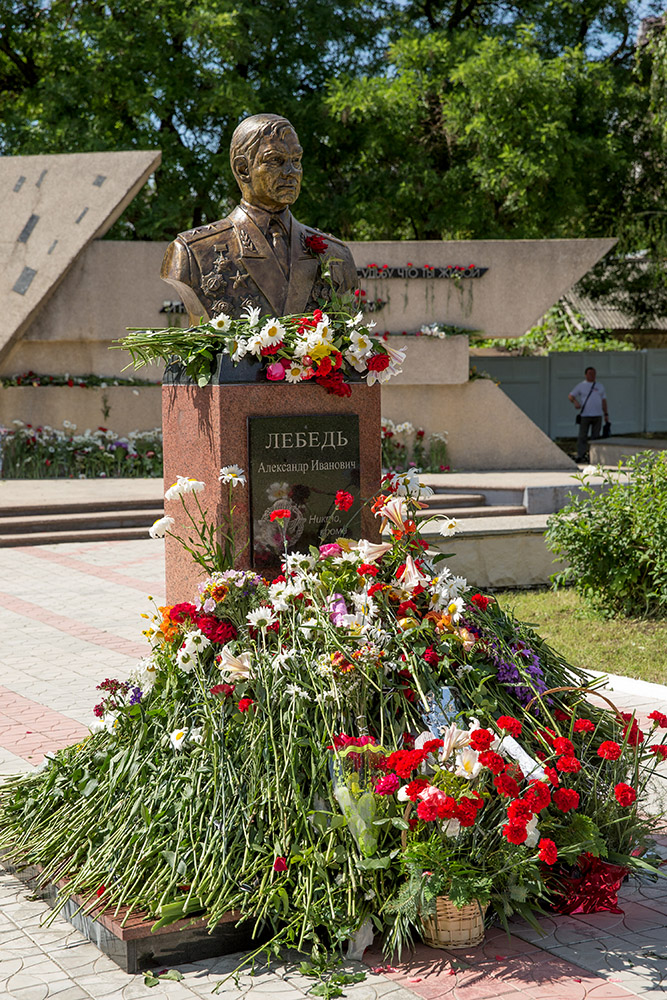
Statue of Aleksandr Lebed in Bender, Moldova

While serving as Governor, Lebed died in a Mil Mi-8 helicopter crash on 28 April 2002. The helicopter collided with electric lines during foggy weather in the Sayan Mountains. Alexei Arbatov, then member of the State Duma for the liberal Yabloko party, called sabotage a possible reason of the crash.

Lebed was survived by his wife, Inna, two sons, a daughter, and his brother Aleksey. Aleksey Lebed served as Head of the Republic of Khakassia from 1997 to 2009.

== Political views ==
During his time in Moldova, Lebed called the separatist Transnistrian government "hooligans" and considered the Moldovan authorities as "fascists". He also called fellow politician Vladimir Zhirinovsky "the Lord God's monkey."

Lebed did not consider Ukraine and Belarus to be separate countries from Russia, nor did he consider the Ukrainian and Belarusian languages separate from the Russian. In 1995 he believed both countries would become part of a new state, on a confederal basis with the Russian Federation, at the end of the 20th century. General Lebed was also strongly against the expansion of NATO into Eastern Europe initially, but by 1997 had changed his attitude to be more accepting of the idea. However, in March 1997 Lebed stated that he believed its expansion would destabilize the alliance and that it was the result of Cold War thinking, which would cause Russia to become authoritarian in response.

Political offices
Preceded by Oleg Lobov	Secretary of the Security Council of Russia; 1996	Succeeded by Ivan Rybkin
Preceded by Valery Zubov	Governor of the Krasnoyarsk Krai; 1998—2002	Succeeded by Alexander Khloponin
