= Andriy Yusov =

Ukrainian public activist and politician

- Андрій Юсов
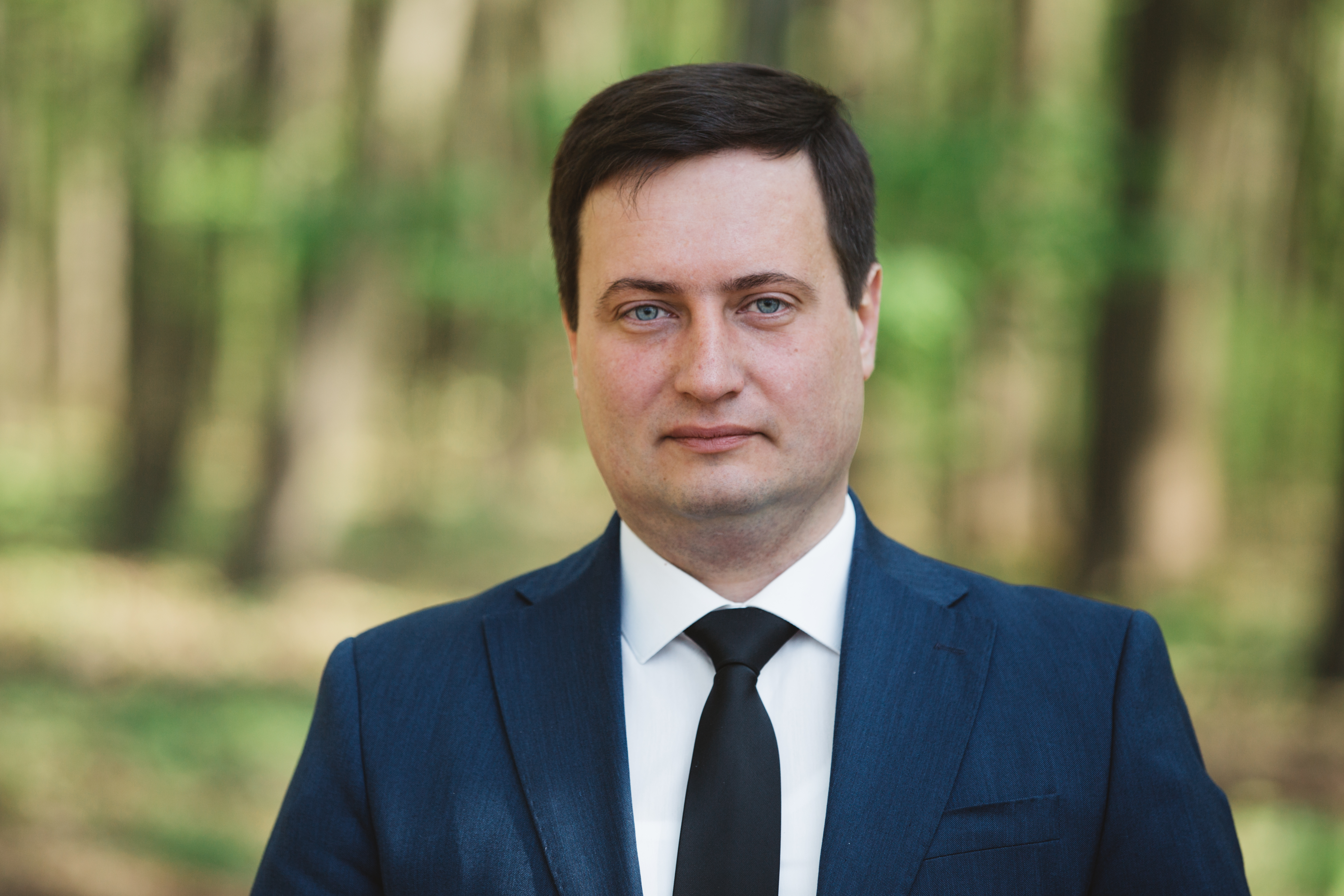
- Born: January 8, 1983 (age 43); Odesa, Ukrainian SSR, Soviet Union
- Education: Kyiv National University of Culture and Arts
- Title: Spokesperson of the Main Directorate of Intelligence
- Term: since 2022

Andriy Volodymyrovych Yusov (Ukrainian: Андрі́й Володи́мирович Ю́сов; born 1983) is a Ukrainian activist and politician. Since 2022, he has served as the press representative of the Main Directorate of Intelligence of the Ukrainian Ministry of Defense.

== Biography ==
On 17 September 2001, he organized a rally in Odesa in memory of murdered Georgian-Ukrainian journalist Georgiy Gongadze.

In 2005, Yusov graduated from the Kyiv National University of Culture and Arts with a focus in law.

On 29 April 2012, Yusov coordinated the opening of a monument to Ukrainian peasants who were killed by the Red Army during the rebellion of the Kholodny Yar Republic.

In 2012, he became the head of the Odesa Oblast regional branch of the party Ukrainian Democratic Alliance for Reform (UDAR). In August 2015, he left UDAR after the party's merger with European Solidarity.

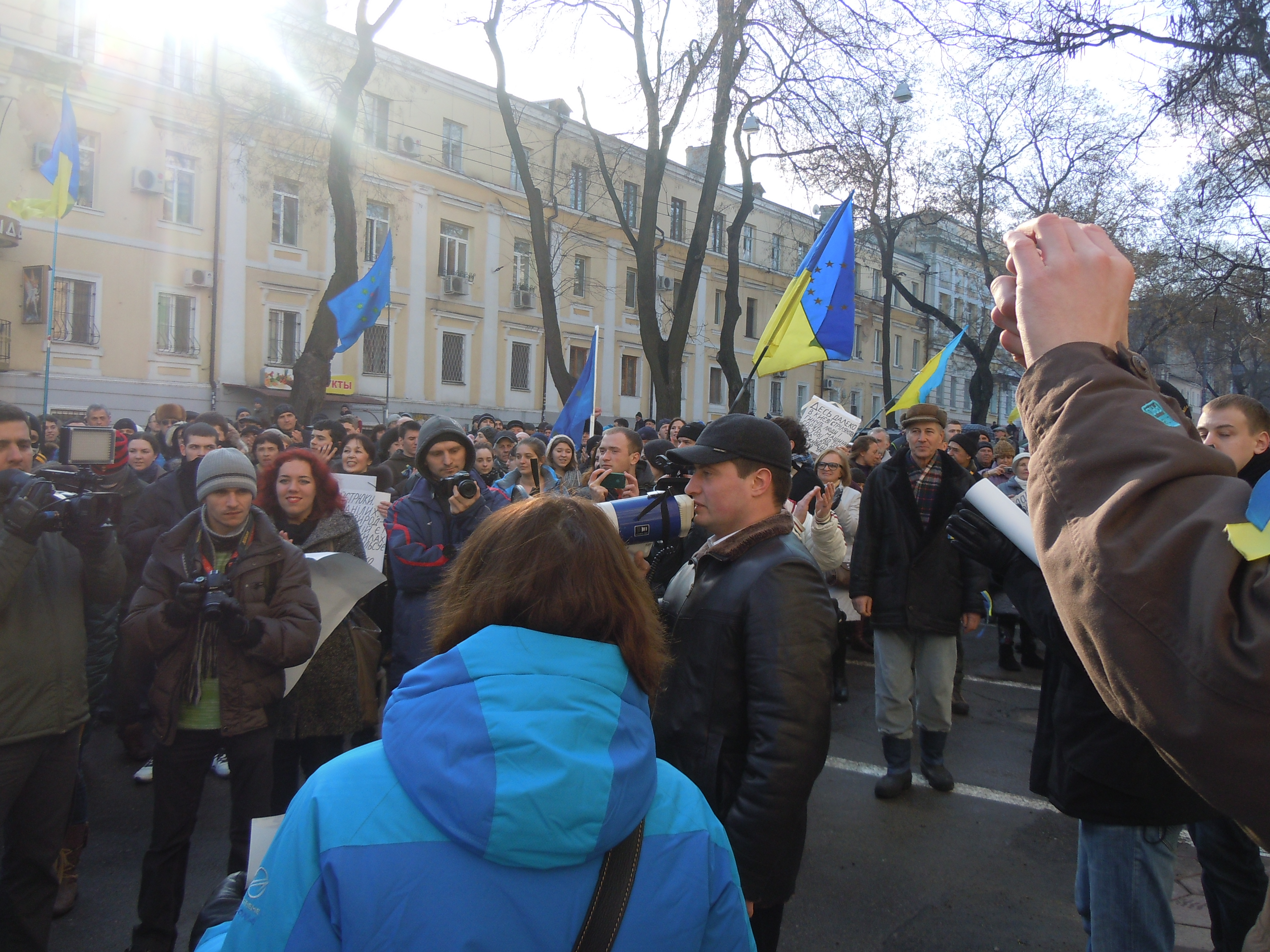
Yusov at the protests in Odesa in 2014

During the 2014 Revolution of Dignity, Yusov became the head of the Odesa Euromaidan group. He went on to take part in the 2014 Odesa clashes.

On 19 September 2014, there was an assassination attempt against Yusov. After being detained, the attacker claimed his actions were an attempt to take revenge for Yusov's activities during the 2014 Odesa clashes. The attacker was sentenced to 15 years in prison. On 19 September 2015, Yusov was beaten in the town Zatoka by people with pro-Russian views, reportedly because of him responding to the greeting "Glory to Ukraine!" by saying "Glory to the heroes!".

In February 2015, Yusov became the public relations advisor to the head of the Security Service of Ukraine in Odesa Oblast, Serhiy Batrakov.

Since 2022, he serves as the press representative of the Main Directorate of Intelligence of the Ukrainian Ministry of Defense.
