= List of Soviet Air Force bases =

Map of Air Force bases of the Soviet union

This List of Soviet Air Force bases is a list containing all air bases within the Soviet Union or utilized by the Soviet Air Forces. Additional information includes the location of the air base, which military units were in command of or hosted at the air base, and aircraft types known to have been based at the air base. Dates shown indicate years during which units and aircraft were known to be at that airbase. If none is indicated, the date is unknown.

In Russia the airbase naming convention seems to be to use the nearest village name, or in the case of a large city, use a numerical designator, e.g. Severomorsk-2. Quite often they are just referred to as, variously, "Tiksi aerodrome" and "Tiksi air base" (uncapitalized). This is also the convention that is used in declassified FOIA documents in the CIA archive website. Therefore, the construction 'X Air Base' or 'X Air Force Base' in regard to the USSR and Russian Federation appears to be incorrect.

== Bases within the Soviet Union ==
Air Base	Nearest Town	Krai/Oblast	SSR	Command	Unit	Aircraft	Notes
Afrikanda	Afrikanda	Murmansk Oblast	Russia	PVO - 10th Army (Arctic)	431 IAP	39 Su-15TM, 1990	
Aktepe-Bezmein	Ashgabat		Turkmenistan	PVO - 12th Independent Air Defense Army (Turkestan Military District)	152 IAP	MiG-23M, MiG-25PD	
Amderma	Amderma	Nenets Autonomous Okrug	Russia	PVO - 10th Army (Arctic)	72 GVIAP	31 MiG-31, 1990	
Andreapol	Andreapol	Tver Oblast	Russia	PVO - Moscow District	28 GVIAP	38 MiG-23, 1990	
Armavir	Armavir	Krasnodar Krai	Russia	FA - North Caucasus Military District	713 UAP	(MiG-23, Mi-8), 1994	
Artem	Artyom	Primorsky Krai	Russia	PVO - 11th Independent Air Defence Army (Far East Military District)	22 IAP	MiG-23	
Artsyz	Artsyz	Odessa Oblast	Ukraine	VTA - Military Transport Aviation	37 GVVTAP	An-12 & Il-76MD	
Ashchebutak	Novoorsk	Orenburg Oblast	Russia				
Astrakhan	Astrakhan	Astrakhan Oblast	Russia	FA - North Caucasus Military District	116 Combat Training Center 209 IAP	(MiG-23, MiG-29, Mi-8), 1994 (MiG-23, Su-27), 1994	?
Beketovsk (Volgograd)	Volgograd	Volgograd Oblast	Russia	FA - North Caucasus Military District	706 UAP	(L-39), 1994	Katcha Air Force Academy, 1994
Balbasovo	Orsha	Vitebsk Region	Belarus	DA - Long-Range Aviation	402 TBAP	20 Tu-22M3	
Baranovichi	Baranavichy	Brest Region	Belarus	PVO - 2nd Air Defence Army	61 IAP	13 MiG-25PDS and 25 MiG-23MLD, 1990	To Belarusian Air Force 1992.
Baranovichi	Baranavichy	Brest Region	Belarus	DA - Long-Range Aviation	203 TBAP	30 Tu-22, Tu-22PD	
Belaya	Usolye-Sibirskoye	Irkutsk Oblast	Russia	DA - Long-Range Aviation	303 TBAP 1225 TBAP	Tu-22M as of 1994	?
Belaya Tserkov	Bila Tserkva	Kyiv Oblast	Ukraine	DA - Long-Range Aviation	251 ITBAP	Tu-22M, Tu-16, Tu-22.	
Belbek	Sevastopol	Crimea	Ukraine	PVO - 8th Army (Black Sea)	62 IAP	39 Su-15TM, 1990	
Besovets	Besovets	Republic of Karelia	Russia	PVO - 10th Army (Arctic)	991 IAP 159 GVIAP	Su-15TM 35 Su-27, 1990	
Bezrechnaya-2	Borzya	Zabaykalsky Krai	Russia	PVO - 14th Independent Air Defence Army	22 IAP	Su-15TM	
Bobrovichi	Kalinkavichy	Gomel Region	Belarus	FA - 26th Air Army (Belorussian Military District)	953 BAP	Su-24	Relocated to Kamenka air base, Kamenka, Penza Oblast in 1994.
Bobrovka	Kinel	Samara Oblast	Russia	PVO - 4th Army	683 IAP	38 MiG-23, 1994	
Bobruysk	Babruysk	Mogilev Region	Belarus	DA - Long-Range Aviation	200 TBAP	15 Tu-22M, 15 Tu-16	
Bolshoye Savino	Perm	Perm Krai	Russia	PVO - 4th Army	764 IAP	(MiG-25), 1994. 38 MiG-23 (later MiG-31)	
Borisoglebsk	Borisoglebsk	Voronezh Oblast	Russia	FA - Moscow Military District	160 UAP	25 MiG-29 and 60 MiG-21, 1990	
Borisovsky Khotilovo	Bologoye	Tver Oblast	Russia	PVO - Moscow District	790 IAP	38 MiG-25, 1990	
Bratsk Airport	Bratsk	Irkutsk Oblast	Russia	PVO - 14th Independent Air Defence Army	350 IAP	MiG-31	
Burevestnik (Iturup)	Iturup Island	Sakhalin Oblast	Russia	PVO - 11th Independent Air Defence Army (Far East Military District)	387 IAP	MiG-23	?
Buturlinovka	Buturlinovsky	Voronezh Oblast	Russia	FA - Moscow Military District	186 UAP	45 Su-25, 1990	
Chervonoglinskaya (Artsyz)	Artsyz	Odesa Oblast	Ukraine	PVO - 8th Army (Black Sea)	737 IAP	36 MiG-23MLD, 1990	
Chirchik-Andizhan	Andijan	Andijan Region	Uzbekistan	PVO - 12th Independent Air Defense Army (Turkestan Military District)	9 GVIAP	32 Su-27 / Su-15	
Chkalovsk	Shchyolkovo	Moscow Oblast	Russia	VTA - Military Transport Aviation	70 OITAPON 353 APON 354 APON	Il-18, Il-76MDK, Tu-104, Tu-134, Tu-154, Aero L-29 & Aero L-39 Il-76MD, Il-86, Il-62, Tu-134, Tu-154 & An-72 An-12, An-24, An-26, Il-22 & Il-76	
Chuguyevka	Chuguyevsky District	Primorsky Krai	Russia	PVO - 11th Independent Air Defence Army (Far East Military District)	530 IAP	MiG-31, MiG-25	
Danilovo	Yoshkar-Ola	Mari El	Russia	PVO - 4th Army	681 IAP	38 MiG-23, 1994	
Daugavpils	Lociki	Augšdaugava Municipality	Latvia		372 APIB	MiG-23, MiG-27	
Dnepropetrovsk/Kaydaki	Dnipro	Dnipropetrovsk Oblast	Ukraine	PVO - 8th Army (Black Sea)	933 IAP	40 MiG-25P/PD/PDS, 1990	
Dolinsk-Sokol	Dolinsk	Sakhalin Oblast	Russia	PVO - 11th Independent Air Defence Army (Far East Military District)	365 IAP 777 IAP	MiG-31, Su-27 MiG-23	(Feskovz)
Dolon	Semey	Abai Region	Kazakhstan	DA - Long-Range Aviation	1223 GV 1226 GV	Tu-95MS, Tu-95M	?
Dombarovsky	Yasny	Orenburg Oblast	Russia	PVO - 4th Army	412 IAP	MiG-23	
Dorokhovo	Bezhetsk	Tver Oblast	Russia	PVO - Moscow District	611 IAP	39 Su-15TM, 1990	
Dyagilevo (Ryazan)	Ryazan	Ryazan Oblast	Russia	DA - Long-Range Aviation	49 UTBAP 43 TSBPPLS	Tu-22M, Tu-95MS, Tu-9, L-39C, L-29 Tu-95U and L-39C as of 1994; Tu-22M and L-29	
Dzemgi	Komsomolsk-na-Amure	Khabarovsk Krai	Russia	PVO - 11th Independent Air Defence Army (Far East Military District)	60 IAP	Su-27	
Dzhida (Elaegnus)	Dzhida	Buryatia	Russia	FA - 23rd Air Army	2 GVBAP; 21 BAP	Su-24	
Dzhankoy	Dzhankoi	Dzhankoi Raion	Ukraine	VTA - Military Transport Aviation	369 VTAP	An-12 & Il-76MD	
Engels-2	Engels	Saratov Oblast	Russia	DA - Long-Range Aviation	1096 TBAP 1230 APSZ	Tu-160 and Tu-134UBL (post-1994). Tu-22, Il-78, ZMD, ZMS-2	
Fergana	Fergana	Fergana Region	Uzbekistan	VTA - Military Transport Aviation	194 GVVTAP	Il-76, An-22	
Gromovo/Sakkola	Gromovo	Leningrad Oblast	Russia	PVO - 6th Independent Air Defence Army	180 GVIAP	31 MiG-31, 1990	
Gudauta	Gudauta	Abkhazia	Georgia	PVO - 19th Air Defence Army (Caucasus)	171 IAP 529 IAP	Su-15TM 34 Su-27	
Kansk	Kansk	Krasnoyarsk Krai	Russia	PVO - 14th Independent Air Defence Army	712 IAP	MiG-31	
Haapsalu/Khaansalu	Haapsalu	Lääne County	Estonia	PVO - 6th Independent Air Defence Army	425 IAP	38 MiG-23MLD, 1990	
Ivanovo Severny	Ivanovo	Ivanovo Oblast	Russia	VTA - Military Transport Aviation	81 VTAP	An-12 & An-22	
Kalinka Airfield	Khabarovsky District	Khabarovsk Krai	Russia	PVO - 11th Independent Air Defence Army (Far East Military District)	301 IAP	MiG-23	
Kapustin Yar		Astrakhan Oblast	Russia	Strategic Rocket Forces	235th Separate Squadron	Mi-8	1994
Khalino	Kursk	Kursk Oblast	Russia	PVO - Moscow District	472 IAP	38 MiG-23, 1990	
Khanskaya/Maykop	Maykop	Adygea	Russia	FA - North Caucasus Military District	761 UAP	(MiG-21, MiG-23), 1994	
Kilp Yavr	Kilpyavr	Murmansk Oblast	Russia	PVO - 10th Army (Arctic)	941 IAP	38 Su-27, 1990	
Kirov		Crimea	Ukraine	PVO - 8th Army (Black Sea)	136 IAP	Su-27	?
Kėdainiai	Daukšiai	Kaunas County	Lithuania	VTA - Military Transport Aviation	600 VTAP	Il-12, An-12, & Il-76	
Klokovo	Tula	Tula Oblast	Russia	VTA - Military Transport Aviation	374 VTAP	Il-76, An-22	
Kobrin	Kobryn	Brest Region	Belarus	FA - 26th Air Army (Belorussian Military District)	397 OSHAP 302 OVE REB	32 Su-25, 1990 13 Mi-8, 1990	
Kotelnikovo	Kotelnikovo	Volgograd Oblast	Russia	FA - North Caucasus Military District	704 UAP	47 MiG-21 and 54 L-39, 1990	
Kramatorsk	Kramatorsk	Donetsk Oblast	Ukraine	PVO - 8th Army (Black Sea)	636 IAP	39 Su-15TM, 1990	
Krasnodar	Krasnodar	Krasnodar Krai	Russia	FA - North Caucasus Military District	802 UAP	(Su-22, Su-24, Su-25, Mi-8), 1994	
Krechevitsy/Novgorod	Veliky Novgorod	Novgorod Oblast	Russia	VTA - Military Transport Aviation	110 VTAP	An-8, An-12 & Il-76	
Krichev	Krychaw	Mogilev Region	Belarus	PVO - Moscow District	28 IAP	38 MiG-25, 1990	
Krivoi Rog	Krivoi Rog	Dnipropetrovsk Oblast	Ukraine	VTA - Military Transport Aviation	16 VTAP	Il-76, An-22	
Kropyvnytskyi	Kirovograd	Kirovograd Oblast	Russia	VTA - Military Transport Aviation	25 GVVTAP		
Krymsk	Krymsk	Krasnodar Krai	Russia	PVO - 19th Air Defence Army (Caucasus)	562 IAP	35 Su-27, 1994	
Kubinka	Kubinka	Moscow Oblast	Russia	FA - Moscow Military District	9th Fighter Aviation Division = 234 GVIAP	16 Su-27, 15 MiG-29, 5 Su-24, 6 Su-25 and 3 Su-22, 1990	
Kupino	Kupino	Novosibirsk Oblast	Russia	PVO - 14th Independent Air Defence Army	849 IAP	MiG-23	
Kushchyovskaya	Kushchyovskaya	Krasnodar Krai	Russia	FA - North Caucasus Military District	797 UAP	108 MiG-21, 1990	
Lebedovo	Privolzsky	Saratov Oblast	Russia				
Mikhailovka/Lebyazhye	Kamyshin	Volgograd Oblast	Russia	FA - North Caucasus Military District	1 GVAPIB	(MiG-23, MiG-27, Su-24)	arrived from Kunmadaras in Hungary April 1991. Subordinate to the 1070th Training Aviation Centre, 1991-1994.
Letneozersky	Obozersky	Arkhangelsk Oblast	Russia	PVO - 10th Army (Arctic)	524 IAP	39 MiG-25, 1990	
Lida	Lida	Grodno Region	Belarus	FA - 26th Air Army (Belorussian Military District)	HQ 1 GVBAD 497 BAP	n/a 29 Su-24, 1990	
Lipki	Minsk	Minsk Oblast	Belarus	FA - 26th Air Army (Belorussian Military District)	50 OSAP	21 Mi-8, 2 Mi-6, 2 Mi-24R, 1990	To Belarusian Air Force 1992.
Lodeynoye Pole	Lodeynoye Pole	Leningrad Oblast	Russia	PVO - 6th Independent Air Defence Army	177 IAP	38 MiG-23MLD, 1990	
Lugovoe	Lugovoy	Jambyl Region	Kazakhstan	PVO - 12th Independent Air Defense Army (Turkestan Military District)	715 IAP	MiG-23M	?
Machulishchi	Machulishchy	Minsk Region	Belarus	PVO - 2nd Air Defence Army	201 IAP	38 MiG-23MLD, 1990	To Belarusian Air Force 1992.
Machulishchy	Machulishchy	Minsk Region	Belarus	DA - Long-Range Aviation	121 TBAP	Tu-22M	
Marinovka	Marinovka	Volgograd Oblast	Russia	FA - North Caucasus Military District	168 GVBAP	(Su-24), 1991-92 for disbandment	Previously Bolshoy Shiraki in Georgia
Marneuli/Sander	Marneuli	Marneuli Municipality	Georgia	PVO - 19th Air Defence Army (Caucasus)	166 IAP	40 Su-15TM, 1990	
Mary-2	Mary		Turkmenistan		1521		training center
Melitopol	Melitopol	Zaporizhzhia Oblast	Ukraine	VTA - Military Transport Aviation	25 GVVTAP	Il-12D, An-12 & Il-76M	
Mengon	Elban	Amur Oblast	Russia	PVO - 11th Independent Air Defence Army (Far East Military District)			
Migalovo	Tver	Tver Oblast	Russia	VTA - Military Transport Aviation	8 VTAP	An-22	
Migalovo	Tver	Tver Oblast	Russia	FA - Moscow Military District	9 FAD = 274 APIB	40 Su-17M4, 1990	
Mirgorod	Myrhorod	Poltava Oblast	Ukraine	PVO - 8th Army (Black Sea)	831 IAP	40 Su-27, 1990	
Monchegorsk	Monchegorsk	Murmansk Oblast	Russia	FA - Leningrad Military District	98 OGRAP	16 MiG-25 and 18 Su-17M3R, 1990	
Monchegorsk	Monchegorsk	Murmansk Oblast	Russia	PVO - 10th Army (Arctic)	174 GVIAP	29 MiG-31, 6 MiG-25, 1990	
Morozovsk	Morozovsk	Rostov Oblast	Russia	FA - North Caucasus Military District	143 BAP	(Su-24), 1994	Feskov: Kopitnari, Georgian Soviet Socialist Republic, 1988
Morshansk		Tambov Oblast	Russia	PVO - Moscow District	153 IAP	18 MiG-31 and 4 MiG-25, 1990	
Mozdok	Mozdok	North Ossetia–Alania	Russia	DA - Long-Range Aviation	121 TBAP 182 TBAP	Tu-22M as of 1994. Tu-95MS16, Tu-95MS6	?
Nasosnaya	Sumqayit	Hacı Zeynalabdin	Azerbaijan	PVO - 19th Air Defence Army (Caucasus)	82 IAP	38 MiG-25	
Nebit-Dag	Balkanabat	Balkan Region	Turkmenistan	PVO - 12th Independent Air Defense Army (Turkestan Military District)	179 GVIAP	MiG-23M	
Nivenskoye	Kaliningrad	Kaliningrad Oblast	Russia	PVO - 6th Independent Air Defence Army	689 GVIAP	36 Su-27, 1990	
Nizhyn (Nezhin)	Nizhyn	Chernihiv Oblast	Ukraine	DA - Long-Range Aviation	199 ODRAP	Tu-22R, Tu-22RDK, Tu-22K, Tu-22	
Norilsk/Alykel	Norilsk	Krasnoyarsk Krai	Russia	PVO - 10th Army (Arctic)	57 GVIAP	Su-15TM	
Nurmalitsy	Olonets	Republic of Karelia	Russia	FA - Leningrad Military District	88 OVE	7 Mi-24, 7 Mi-8, 2 Mi-24K and 2 Mi-24R, 1990	
Omsk-Severnyy	Omsk	Omsk Oblast	Russia	PVO - 14th Independent Air Defence Army	64 IAP	MiG-31	
Orlovka	Svobodny	Amur Oblast	Russia	PVO - 11th Independent Air Defence Army (Far East Military District)	404 IAP	MiG-29, Su-27	MO PVO
Osovcy/Osovitsy	Byaroza	Brest Region	Belarus	FA - 26th Air Army (Belorussian Military District)	927 IAP	51 MiG-29, 4 MiG-21, 1990	To Belarusian Air Force 1992 and reorganized as 927th Fighter Aviation Base.
Ozerne	Ozerne	Zhytomyr Oblast	Ukraine	DA - Long-Range Aviation	341 TBAP	Tu-22M2, Tu-22PD	
Ozernoye (Ozerne)	Ozerne	Zhytomyr Oblast	Ukraine	PVO - 8th Army (Black Sea)	2-4 PVO, 894 IAP	38 MiG-23MLD, 1990	
Panevezhis	Panevėžys	Panevėžys County	Lithuania	VTA - Military Transport Aviation	128 GVVTAP	An-12, Il-76M	
Panfilovo (Kalmanka)	Panfilovo	Altai Krai	Russia		44 UAP		Barnaul VVAUL
Pärnu(russian Пярнуский аэропорт)	Pärnu	Pärnu County	Estonia	PVO - 6th Independent Air Defence Army	366 IAP 655 IAP	MiG-23 42 MiG-23MLD, 1990	?
Poduzhemye (Kem)	Kem	Republic of Karelia	Russia	PVO - 10th Army (Arctic)	265 IAP	39 Su-15TM, 1990	
Poltava	Poltava	Poltava Oblast	Ukraine	DA - Long-Range Aviation	185 TBAP	Tu-22M3	
Postavy	Postavy	Vitebsk Region	Belarus	FA - 26th Air Army (Belorussian Military District)	305 BAP 378 OSHAP	30 Su-24, 1990 32 Su-25, 1990	To Belarusian Air Force 1992 and reorganized as 378th Aviation Base 1993 before disbandment 1995.
Postovaya	Oktyabrsky	Khabarovsk Krai	Russia	PVO - 11th Independent Air Defence Army (Far East Military District)	308 IAP	MiG-23	
Pravdinsk	Pravdinsk	Nizhny Novgorod Oblast	Russia	PVO - Moscow District	786 IAP	31 MiG-31 and 5 MiG-25, 1990	
Pribytki (Ziabrauka)	Gomel	Gomel Region	Belarus	DA - Long-Range Aviation	290 ODRAP	Tu-22RDM, 28 Tu-22R	
Primorsko-Akhtarsk	Primorsko-Akhtarsk	Krasnodar Krai	Russia	FA - North Caucasus Military District	960 UAP	(L-39), 1994	
Privolzhskiy/Volga	Astrakhan	Astrakhan Oblast	Russia	PVO - 19th Air Defence Army (Caucasus)	209 IAP 393 IAP	38 MiG-23MLD, 1990	
Pruzhany	Pruzhany	Brest Region	Belarus	FA - 26th Air Army (Belorussian Military District)	206 OSHAP	29 Su-25, 7 L-39, 1990	To Belarusian Air Force 1992, relocated to Lida and reorganized as 206th Assault Aviation Base.
Pryluki	Kyiv	Chernihiv Oblast	Ukraine	DA - Long-Range Aviation	184 TBAP	Tu-160, Tu-134UBL	
Pskov-Kresty	Pskov	Pskov Oblast	Russia	VTA - Military Transport Aviation	334 VTAP	Il-76, An-22	
Raadi	Tartu	Tartu County	Estonia	DA - Long-Range Aviation	132 TBAP	Tu-22M3, Tu-16	
Raadi/Tartu	Tartu	Tartu County	Estonia	VTA - Military Transport Aviation	196 GVVTAP	Tu-4D, An-12 & Il-76	
Rakvere	Rakvere		Estonia	VTA - Military Transport Aviation	566 VTAP		
Rogachevo	Rogachevo	Arkhangelsk Oblast	Russia	PVO - 10th Army (Arctic)	641 GVIAP	32 Su-27, 2 Mi-8, 1990	
Ros	Ros	Grodno Region	Belarus	FA - 26th Air Army (Belorussian Military District)	116 GVBAP	30 Su-24, 1991	To Belarusian Air Force 1992 and reorganized as 116th Guards Assault Aviation Base.
Rostov-on-Don	Rostov-on-Don	Rostov Oblast	Russia	PVO - 19th Air Defence Army (Caucasus)	83 GVIAP	40 MiG-25PDS, 1990	
Rostov-na-Donu	Rostov-on-Don	Rostov Oblast	Russia	FA - North Caucasus Military District	83 GVIAP 359 Separate Transport Squadron?	40 MiG-25PDS, 1990 (Mi-26, Mi-8), 1994?	?
Rūdininkai	Vilnius		Lithuania				
Salka	Nizhny Tagil	Sverdlovsk Oblast	Russia	PVO - 4th Army	765 IAP	Su-9 and later MiG-23	
Salmi		Republic of Karelia	Russia		?		
Savasleyka (Savostleyka)	Vyksa	Nizhny Novgorod Oblast	Russia	FA - Moscow Military District	148 TSBPPLS 54 GVIAP	Su-27, MiG-31, Mi-8, 1994 Su-27	
Savatiya	Kotlas	Arkhangelsk Oblast	Russia	PVO - 10th Army (Arctic)	445 IAP	41 MiG-25, 1990	
Schuchin	Shchuchyn	Grodno Region	Belarus	FA - 26th Air Army (Belorussian Military District)	151 OAP REB 10 ORAP	27 MiG-25BM and 20 Yak-28PP, 1990 32 MiG-25, 6 Su-24 and 14 MiG-21, 1990	To Belarusian Air Force 1992 and disbanded 1993. To Belarusian Air Force 1992 and reduced to 3rd Squadron of 116th Guards Assault Aviation Base 1994.
Seshcha	Dubrovka	Bryansk Oblast	Russia	VTA - Military Transport Aviation	8 VTAP 235 VTAP 566 VTAP	An-12 An-124 An-12, An-22, Il-76	
Semey (Semipalatinsk)	Semey	Abai Region	Kazakhstan	PVO - 14th Independent Air Defence Army	356 IAP	MiG-31	
Sennoy (Bagay-Baranovka)	Sennoy	Saratov Oblast	Russia	FA - Moscow Military District	9 FAD = 343 IIAP	54 MiG-29, 1990	
Sharomy (air base)			Russia	AV-MF			
Shatalovo	Pochinok	Smolensk Oblast	Russia	FA - Moscow Military District	1046th Center for retraining of personnel 164 OGRAP 9 FAD = 32 GVIAP	17 MiG-25RB, 13 Su-24MR and 14 Su-17M3R, 1990 14 MiG-25RB and 12 Su-24MR, 1990 MiG-23MLD	
Sinalepa/Haapsalu	Sinalepa/Haapsalu		Estonia	VTA - Military Transport Aviation	196 GVVTAP		
Siversky/Siverskaya	Siversky	Leningrad Oblast	Russia	FA - Leningrad Military District	67 BAP	30 Su-24, 1990	
Slavgorod	Slavgorod	Altai Krai	Russia		59 UAP		Barnaul VVAUL
Smolensk	Smolensk	Smolensk Oblast	Russia	VTA - Military Transport Aviation	103 GVVTAP	Li-2, An-12, Il-14 & An-26	
Smolensk	Smolensk	Smolensk Oblast	Russia	PVO - Moscow District	401 IAP	MiG-23P	
Smuravevo	Gdov	Pskov Oblast	Russia	FA - Leningrad Military District	722 BAP	30 Su-24, 1990	
Soltsy-2	Soltsy	Novgorod Oblast	Russia	DA - Long-Range Aviation	840 TBAP	Tu-22M3 as of 1994	
Spassk-Dalny	Spassk-Dalny	Primorsky Krai	Russia	DA - Long-Range Aviation	219 ODRAP	Tu-16R, Tu-16Z	
Sredne Belaya	Srednebelaya	Amur Oblast	Russia	VTA - Military Transport Aviation	194 GVVTAP	Li-2	
Stepyanka			Belarus	FA - 26th Air Army (Belorussian Military District)	56 OPSAU		Command and control center. To Belarusian Air Force 1992 and became 56 OPS.
Stryy (Stryi)	Stryi	Lviv Oblast	Ukraine	PVO - 8th Army (Black Sea)	179 IAP	43 MiG-23MLD, 1990	
Stryi	Stryi	Lviv Oblast	Ukraine	DA - Long-Range Aviation	260 TBAP	Tu-22M3, Tu-16	
Stupino	Stupino	Moscow Oblast	Russia	PVO - Moscow District	436 OTAP	7 Mi-8, 1990	
Taganrog-Central	Taganrog	Rostov Oblast	Russia	VTA - Military Transport Aviation	708 VTAP	Il-76	
Taganrog	Taganrog	Rostov Oblast	Russia	PVO - 8th Army (Black Sea)	963 IAPIB 6236 Aircraft Handling Plant	116 Su-17, 1990	?
Talagi	Arkhangelsk	Arkhangelsk Oblast	Russia	PVO - 10th Army (Arctic)	518 IAP	31 MiG-31, 1990	
Tallinn	Tallinn		Estonia	PVO - 6th Independent Air Defence Army	384 IAP	MiG-23	?
Tambov	Tambov	Tambov Oblast	Russia	FA - Moscow Military District	4255th Reserve Aircraft Depot		
Tapa	Tapa	Lääne-Viru County	Estonia	PVO - 6th Independent Air Defence Army	656 IAP	38 MiG-23MLD, 1990	
Tikhoretsk	Tikhoretsk	Krasnodar Krai	Russia	FA - North Caucasus Military District	627 GVUAP	(L-39), 1994	
Tolmachevo	Ob	Novosibirsk Oblast	Russia	PVO - 14th Independent Air Defence Army	849 IAP	Su-9	
Topoduzheme		Karelia	Russia	PVO - 10th Army (Arctic)	265 IAP	Su-27 1994	(Vasquez & Feskov)?
Totskoye	Totskoye	Orenburg Oblast	Russia	FA - Moscow Military District	281 IIAP	66 MiG-23, 1990	
Tunoshna	Tunoshna	Yaroslavl Oblast	Russia	PVO - Moscow District	415 IAP	38 MiG-23, 1990	
Ukkurey (Nikolayevskoye)	Chernyshevsk	Chita Oblast	Russia	FA - 23rd Air Army	193 OGRAP	MiG-23RB	
Ukrainka	Belogorsk	Amur Oblast	Russia	DA - Long-Range Aviation	40 TBAP 79 TBAP	Tu-95K, Tu-95KM	?
Ulyanovsk Baratayevka	Ulyanovsk	Ulyanovsk Oblast	Russia	VTA - Military Transport Aviation	235 VTAP	An-124	
Uzyn	Uzyn	Kyiv Oblast	Ukraine	DA - Long-Range Aviation	1006 TBAP 409 APSZ	Tu-95MS, Tu-95, Il-78	?
Vainode	Vaiņode	Kuldīga Municipality	Latvia	PVO - 6th Independent Air Defence Army	54 GVIAP	38 Su-27, 1990	
Vasylkiv	Vasylkiv	Kyiv Oblast	Ukraine	PVO - 8th Army (Black Sea)	146 GVIAP	41 MiG-25/PD/PDS/PU, 1990	
Verkhnaya Zaimka	Nizhneangarsk	Buryatia	Russia				?
Vibetsk-North	Vitebsk	Vitebsk Region	Belarus	VTA - Military Transport Aviation	339 VTAP	Tu-4D, An-12, Il-76MD (30 in 1991)	To Belarusian Air Force 1992 and disbanded 1996.
Vozdvizhenka	Ussuriysk	Primorsky Krai	Russia	DA - Long-Range Aviation	444 TBAP	Tu-16	
Vyaz'ma	Vyazma	Smolensk Oblast	Russia	PVO - Moscow District	45 IAP	MiG-23P	Not listed by Holm.
Vypolzovo	Vypolzovo	Tver Oblast	Russia	VTA - Military Transport Aviation	334 VTAP 566 VTAP	Li-2 ?	
Yefremov/Efremov	Yefremov	Tula Oblast	Russia	PVO - Moscow District	191 IAP	38 MiG-23, 1990	
Yelizovo-Petropavlovsk	Petropavlovsk-Kamchatsky	Kamchatka Krai	Russia	PVO - 11th Independent Air Defence Army (Far East Military District)	865 IAP	MiG-31	
Zaporozhye	Zaporizhzhia	Zaporizhzhia Oblast	Ukraine	VTA - Military Transport Aviation	338 VTAP	Tu-4D, An-12 & Il-76MD	
Zaporozh'ye	Zaporizhzhia	Zaporizhzhia Oblast	Ukraine	PVO - 8th Army (Black Sea)	738 IAP	MiG-25PD	
Zavitinsk	Zavitinsk	Amur Oblast	Russia	DA - Long-Range Aviation	303 TBAP	Tu-22K	
Zhulyany	Zhuliany	Kyiv	Ukraine	PVO - 8th Army (Black Sea)	223 OSAP	An-24, An-26, Mi-8	?
Zolotaya Dolina	Nakhodka	Primorsky Krai	Russia	PVO - 11th Independent Air Defence Army (Far East Military District)	47 IAP	Su-27	

== Bases outside of the Soviet Union ==
Air Base	Nearest Town	Region	Country	Unit	Aircraft	Notes
Al Anad			South Yemen			
Allstedt	Allstedt	Saxony-Anhalt	East Germany	294 ORAP 225 OVP 292 OVEREB		
Schönefeld	Schönefeld	Brandenburg	East Germany	518 IAP 226 OSAP 9 GVIAP		
Brand	Halbe	Brandenburg	East Germany	116 GVBAP 668 BAP 296 APIB 277 BAP		
Brandis	Brandis	Saxony	East Germany	485 OVP 357 OSHAP 497 BAP 393 GVIAP 559 APIB 684 GVIAP 239 OGVVP 225 OVP 845 IAP 337 OVP 197 GVVTAP 31 GVIAP		
Choibalsan Air Base			Mongolian People's Republic	43rd Fighter-Bomber Aviation Regiment	Sukhoi Su-7s and Su-17s, 1968-1990	
Choir (Bayantal)			Mongolian People's Republic	126th IAP	MIG-21 and MIG-23, -1992	
Chojna/Choyna			Poland	582 IAP	32 Su-27, 1990	
Damgarten	Ribnitz-Damgarten	Mecklenburg-Vorpommern	East Germany	773 IAP 515 IAP 19 GVAPIB 43 APIB 20 GVAPIB 33 IAP 263 IAP 156 IAP 813 IAP		
Dresden-Klotzsche	Dresden	Saxony	East Germany	6 OVE 393 GVIAP 157 IAP		
Dresden-Hellerau	Hellerau	Saxony	East Germany	6 OVE		
Falkenberg (Alt Lönnewitz)			East Germany	296 APIB 684 GVIAP 968 IAP 32 GVIAP 641 GVIAP 137 GVIAP 86 GVIAP 85 GVIAP 31 GVIAP 73 GVIAP		
Finsterwalde			East Germany	393 GVIAP 34 BAP 911 APIB 559 APIB		
Finow			East Germany	41 OVE 868 IAP 668 BAP 33 IAP 787 IAP 34 BAP 393 GVIAP 277 BAP 67 GVIAP 730 APIB 347 IAP		
Großenhain			East Germany	497 BAP 676 IAP 559 APIB 878 IAP 892 GVIAP 296 APIB 684 GVIAP 2 GVBAP 689 GVIAP 168 IAP 900 IAP 116 GVBAP 86 GVIAP 789 GVIAP 916 IAP		
Hradčany; Mimon-Gradchany	Ralsko	Liberec Region	Czechoslovakia	236 APIB	MiG-27K	
Jüterbog Airfield ("Altes Lager")			East Germany			
Kalocsa			Hungary	396 GVVP	Mi-8	
Kiskunlacháza			Hungary	14 GVIAP	34 MiG-29 and 9 MiG-23UM, 1990	
Kluczewo			Poland	239 IAD HQ 159 GVIAP	n/a 35 Su-27, 1990	
Koethen			East Germany	73 GVIAP	MiG-29	Shaykovka 1994. Former 296th Fighter Regiment; Lydia Litvyak flew with this unit.
Kołobrzeg			Poland	871 IAP	39 MiG-23MLD, 1990	
Krzywa			Poland	3 BAP	20 Su-24, 1990	
Kunmadaras			Hungary	1 GVAPIB	32 MiG-27 and 10 MiG-23, 1990	
Lärz	Mirow		East Germany			
Leipzig-Altenburg Airport			East Germany			
Magdeburg–Cochstedt Airport			East Germany			
Mahlwinkel			East Germany			
Merseburg			East Germany			
Milovice	Milovice	Central Bohemian Region	Czechoslovakia	114 IAP	10 MiG-29 and 26 MiG-23, 1990	
Neuruppin			East Germany			
Nohra			East Germany			
Alt Daber Airfield			East Germany			
Oranienburg			East Germany			
Parchim			East Germany			
Sármellék			Hungary	5 GVIAP	MiG-29	
Sliač/Sliach	Sliač	Banská Bystrica Region	Czechoslovakia	114 IAP	MiG-21	
Sperenberg Airfield			East Germany			
Stendal			East Germany			
Szprotawa			Poland	149 BAD HQ 89 BAP	n/a 24 Su-24, 1990	
Templin (Groß Dölln)			East Germany			
Tököl			Hungary	515 IAP	MiG-21bis	
Tutow (Demmin)			East Germany			
Welzow (Neu Welzow)			East Germany	East Germany		
Werneuchen			East Germany			
Wittstock Air Base			East Germany			
Zerbst			East Germany			
Żagań/Zhagan			Poland	42 GVBAP	25 Su-24, 1990	

== See also ==
- List of military airbases in Russia
