= Forces of central subordination of the Russian Air Force 2008 =

The Forces of central subordination of the Russian Air Force report directly to the Headquarters of the Air Force. This listing is believed to be accurate as of August 2008.

== Units and formations ==
- 132nd Central Communications Center, Balashikha, Zarya airport, Moscow Oblast
- 1st Fighter-Bomber Aviation Regiment - Su-24 - Lebyazhye - absorbed by 6970th Aviation Base, 1 September 2009
- 764th Fighter Aviation Regiment - MiG-31, MiG-25PU - Bolshoye Savino Airport (Sokol)
- 8th Special Purpose Aviation Division (Chkalovsky Air Base)
  - 353rd Special Purpose Aviation Regiment— Chkalovsky Air Base — Il-18, Il-76, Аn-12, Аn-72, Тu-134, Тu-154.
  - 354th Special Purpose Aviation Regiment— Chkalovsky Air Base — Il-18, Il-76, Аn-12, Аn-72, Тu-134, Тu-154.
  - 206th Special Purpose Aviation Base — Chkalovsky Air Base — Mi-8 helicopters.
  - 223rd Flight Unit - commercial transport - Chkalovsky Air Base - Il-62M, Il-76MD, Tu-134A-3, Tupolev Tu-154B-2
- 2457th Air Base of Long Range Radio location Detection Aircraft - Beriev A-50, A-50М - Ivanovo Severny
- 929th State Flight Test Centre named for V. P. Chkalov (Akhtubinsk)
  - 1338th Test Centre (испытательный центр) Chkalovsky Air Base - Il-22, Il-80, and Il-82
  - High-altitude mountain Centre for Air Materiel and Weapons Research - Nalchik
  - 368th Detached Composite Aviation Squadron
  - 13th Aeronautic Test Facility - Volsk - air balloons
  - 267th Center of Test Pilots Training - Akhtubinsk
- 4th Centre for Combat Training and Flight Personnel Training - Lipetsk
- 968th Sevastopol Research-Instructor Mixed Aviation Regiment, Lipetsk, fighter jets MiG-29, Su-27, Su-27M, Su-30, bombers Su-24M, Su-24M2, Su-34, Su-24MP reconnaissance aircraft, jammer Su-24MP, strike-fighter Su-25, Su-25T, Su-25SM. The regiment was transferred back to Russia from the Western Group of Forces in 1992. Aviation and Cosmos wrote in 2010 that at the time "The most painful was the uncertainty with the future. Initially, Zaporozhye was designated as the new base of the regiment. A reconnaissance group was sent there, which, upon returning, reported that the airfield was in a deplorable state. The “parade of sovereignties” that burst out after the Belovezha Accords did not increase personnel optimism. The ..instructions for combat training for the new 1992 academic year gave some clarity: the regiment was ordered to prepare for redeployment to the Seshcha (airfield) (ru:Сеща (аэродром)) in Bryansk Oblast, which, according to the experience of military units that had previously left Germany, most likely meant disbandment."
- 3958th Guards Kerch Aviation Base, Savasleyka, Nizhegorod Oblast, MiG-31.
- 4020th Base for Reserve Aircraft, Lipetsk
- 185th Centre for Combat Training and Flight Personnel Training - Astrakhan
  - 116th Training Center operational use — Аstrakhan — MiG-23, MiG-29
  - 42nd Training Center operational use — Ashuluk — Surface-to-air missiles (SAMs) and targets.
- 344th Centre for Combat Training and Flight Personnel Training - Torzhok (ground forces helicopters) (ru:344 Центр боевой подготовки и переучивания лётного состава армейской авиации)
  - 696th Research and Instruction Helicopter Regiment (Torzhok)(Ka-50, Mi-8, Mi-24, Mi-26, has used Mi-28)
  - 92nd Research and Instruction Helicopter Squadron (Sokol-Vladimir (Ruwiki says Klin)) (Mi-8, Mi-24)
- 924th Centre for Combat Training and Flight Personnel Training - Yegoryevsk Base UAV.
  - 275th Separate research and UAV squadron instructors(Unmanned Aerial Vehicles), Yegoryevsk, Moscow Oblast. UAV Tu-143, Yak PCHELA-1T, IAI Searcher 2.
- Russian State Scientific-Research Institute Centre for Cosmonaut Training - Zvezdnyi Goronok
  - 70th Separate Test and Training Aviation Regiment Special Purpose — Chkalovski — Ilyushin Il-76 and other.

The 4215th Base for Reserve Aircraft used to be located at Dmitreyevka (Chebenki (air base)), in Orenburg Oblast, with over 200 Su-24s and Su-17s on hand in 2000–01. It was reorganized into an aviation base in 2007.

== Warehouses, depots, aircraft repair plants ==
Склады, базы хранения и ремонта, авиаремонтные заводы

- Central Aviation Base of Rocket Armament and Ammunition, Sergiyev Posad, Moscow Oblast
- Aviation Warehouse of Rocket Armament and Ammunition, Yoshkar-Ola
- Supply and Storage Depot of Air Defense Rocket Armament, Serpukhov, Moscow Oblast
- Storage and Maintenance Depot of Unmanned Aerial Vehicles, Yaroslavl (Tunoshna)
- 502nd Military Equipment Maintenance Plant, Fryazevo (Noginsk-5)
- 1015th Military Equipment Maintenance Plant, Nizhniye Sergi-3, Sverdlovsk Oblast
- 1019th Military Equipment Maintenance Plant, Onokhoy-2, Buryat Republic
- 1253rd Central Radar Armament Maintenance Base, Samara-28
- 2227th Armament Maintenance and Storage Base, Trudovaya, Moscow Oblast
- 2503rd Central Base of Automated Control Systems Maintenance, Yanino-1, Leningrad Oblast
- 2529th Central Base of Armament Maintenance, Khabarovsk
- 2633rd Base of Armament Maintenance and Storage, Lyubertsy, Moscow Oblast
- 3821st Base of Armament Maintenance and Storage, Tosno, Leningrad Oblast
- 20th Aircraft Overhaul Plant, Pushkin-3 (Pushkin Airport), Leningrad Oblast
- 150th Aircraft Overhaul Plant, Lyublino-Novoye, Kaliningrad Oblast
- 419th Aircraft Overhaul Plant, Gorelovo, Leningrad Oblast
- 695th Aircraft Overhaul Plant, Aramil, Sverdlovsk Oblast
- 99th Air-Technical Equipment Plant, Ostafyevo (Shcherbinka), Moscow Oblast
- 5212nd Testing and Control (Docking?) Station, Znamensk, Astrakhan Oblast

Tambov (air base) in Tambov Oblast used to be the location of the 301st Aircraft Repair Factory (ARZ) which became the 3119th Aviation Base for the Storage and Disposal of Aviation Equipment in mid-2001. Hundreds of combat aircraft may have been stored for disposal here.

Other previous Aircraft Repair Factories / Aircraft Overhaul Factories were the 121st (Kubinka) (121 Aircraft Repair Factory), 275th (Krasnodar), 360th (Dyaghilevo airbase, Ryazan)(360 Aircraft Repair Factory). The 360 ARZ is under sanctions of the European Union and USA due to the Russian invasion of Ukraine. 419th at Gorelovo (air base) in Leningrad Oblast, and the 568th (Pushkin, St Petersburg). The 322nd Aircraft Repair Factory may still be located at Vozdvizhenka (air base) in the Far East. Others reported included the 308th at Ivanovo (An-24/26/40/74) and the 514th at Rzhev.

Until 1996, the 336th Aircraft Repair Plant of the Ministry of Defense - Military Unit 13814 (which repaired An-26 aircraft, previously Il-28) operated at Orenburg (air base) ("Orenburg-2") airfield, Orenburg Oblast.

The 210th Aviation Repair Plant (PVO) was previously located in Azerbaijan and the Aircraft Repair Plant No 405 in Kazakhstan.

== Training and research organisations ==
See Soviet military academies

- 2nd Central Scientific-Research Institute — Tver
- 13th State Scientific Research Institute "ERAT" Luberchi Moscow oblast.
- 30th Central Scientific Research Institute, Ministry of Defence (Russia) (ЦНИИ АКТ) — Shelkovo, it includes also research institutes in Noginsk.
- Gagarin Military Air Academy (VVA) — Monino
- Zhukovsky Air Force Engineering Academy — Moscow
- Zhukov Command Academy of Air Defense — Tver (branch in St. Petersburg)
- Yaroslavl Anti-aircraft missile defense institute. (Yaroslavl Higher Military School of Anti-Aircraft Warfare)
- Chelyabinsk Red Banner Military Aviation Institute of Navigators
  - 604th Training Aviation Regiment — Chelyabinsk Shagol Airport
- Voronezh Central Military Aviation Engineering University (VCMAEU)
- Irkutsk Military Aviation Engineering Institute - disbanded in 2009 and transferred to VCMAEU.
- Tambov Military Aviation Engineering Institute - disbanded in 2009 and transferred to VCMAEU.
- Krasnodar Military Aviation Institute (L-39Cs);by 2016, the Krasnodar Higher Military Aviation Pilots named for Hero of the Soviet Union A.K. Serov
  - 627th Training Aviation Regiment — Тихорецк — Aero L-39 Albatros
  - 704th Training Aviation Regiment — Котельниково — L-39
  - 797th Training Aviation Regiment — Kushchyovskaya (air base) — L-39, Su-25, Su-27, MiG-29
- Syzran Military Aviation Institute (Mi-2, Mi-8, Mi-24)
  - 131st Training Aviation Regiment — Saratov-Sokol — Mi-2, Mi-8
  - 484th Training Helicopter Regiment — Syzran airfield — Mi-24
  - 626th Training Helicopter Regiment — Пугачев — Mi-2, Mi-8, Mi-24
  - Branch in Kirov, Kirov Oblast
- 783rd Training Centre (Armavir) (MiG-29, L-39C)
  - 713th Training Aviation Regiment — Armavir — L-39, MiG-29
  - 761st Training Aviation Regiment — Khanskaya — L-39
- [785th?] Aviation Training Center for training flight crews and long-range military transport aircraft - Balashov
  - [606th?] Training Aviation Regiment - Balashov
  - 666th Training Aviation Regiment - Rtishchevo
- 786th Training Centre (Borisoglebsk):
  - 160th Training Aviation Regiment — Borisoglebsk — Su-27
  - 644th Training Aviation Regiment — Michurinsk — L-39, Su-24, Su-25, MiG-29
- Center for anti-aircraft missile troops, Uchhoz (Gatchina-3), the Leningrad Region. Chief - Colonel Alexander Dobrovolsky.
- 357th Training Center, Belgorod. Chief - Colonel Viktor Baranov.
- 834th Centre for Signal Corps Radio and ensure, Novgorod. Chief - Colonel Vasily Fedosov.
- 874th training center (settlement) of radio engineering troops, Vladimir. Chief - Colonel Yuri Balaban.
- 902nd Training Center (settlement) of anti-aircraft missile troops Kosterevo-1, Vladimir Oblast.

== Medical and athletic facilities ==
- State Research Institute of Aviation and Space Medicine, Moscow. Chief - Major-General Igor Ushakov.
- 5th Central Military Research Aviation Hospital, Krasnogorsk-3, Moscow Region.
- 7th Central Military Research Aviation Hospital, Moscow.
- Spa Air Force, Chemitokvadzhe, Krasnodar Krai. Chief - Colonel Theodore Barantsev.
- Central Sports Club VVS Samara. Chief - Colonel Dmitry Shlyahtin.
- 361st Center of psychophysiological training of personnel, Agha, Krasnodar region.
- 709th Center of psychophysiological training of personnel, Anapa (now Dzhubga), Krasnodar region.
- 464th Training Center for Physical Culture and Sports, Ufa, Bashkortostan.

== See also ==
- ru:558 Авиационный ремонтный завод - Russian Wikipedia article on 558th Aircraft Repair Factory, major Belarus repair establishment
- ru:Категория:Предприятия авиационной промышленности СССР - Russian category on aviation repair plants in the USSR

== Sources ==
- WARFARE.BE. "Воздушно-Космические Силы" (in Russian). Archived from the original on 2016-05-13.
- Piotr Butowsky. Force Report:Russian Air Force, Air Forces Monthly, August 2007 issue; Pyotr Butowski, Air Power Analysis: Russian Federation, Part 2, International Air Power Review, AIRTime Publishing, No.13, Summer 2004 (also Part 1 in a previous issue)
- Новая Россия - Военно-воздушные силы (Библиография)(in Russian)
- Yefim Gordon, Dmitriy Komissarov, Russian Air Power, updated 2011 edition; Yefim Gordon, Russian Air Power, 2009 edition; Kommersant-Vlast, State of Russia's Air Forces 2008 No.33 (786) 25 August 2008 (in Russian)
- Что такое современная армия России [What is the modern army of Russia]. Vlast (in Russian). 7 (610). Kommersant. 21 February 2005. Archived from the original on 2007-11-14.
- Aleksandr Stukalin, Mikail Lukin, ‘Vys Rossiyskaya Armiya’, Kommersant-Vlast, Moscow, Russia, (14 May 2002).
- (August 2009) - drawing on a Kommersant-Vlast report on the Russian Air Forces (Kommersant-Vlast, State of Russia's Air Forces 2008 No.33 (786) 25 August 2008 (in Russian)
