= Kobrin (disambiguation) =

Kobrin (or Kobryn or Kobryń) is a city in the Brest voblast of Belarus and the center of the Kobryn district.

Kobrin may also refer to:

- Kobrin (surname)
- Kobrin Uyezd, subdivision of Grodno Governorate of the Russian Empire
- FC Kobrin
- Kobrin (air base)
- Kobryn district
