= Gorelovo =

Gorelovo may refer to:

- Gorelovo Municipal Okrug, a municipal okrug in Krasnoselsky District of the federal city of St. Petersburg, Russia
- Gorelovo (air base), a defunct air base in Leningrad Oblast, Russia
- Gorelovo (rural locality), several rural localities in Russia
