= 4th Independent Air Defence Army =

The 4th Independent Air Defence Army (Russian: 4-я отдельная армия ПВО) was an army of the Soviet Air Defence Forces. It was formed on 10 April 1960 from the Uralskaya Air Defence Army at Sverdlovsk, Sverdlovsk Oblast. It carried the Military Unit Number 10866.

The army originates from the 5th Air Defence Corps formed during the Second World War. On December 28, 1945, the 5th Air Defence Corps arrived in Moscow, where it began to carry out combat duty on the air defence of the capital. The structure of the corps at that time included 3 anti-aircraft artillery divisions (12 anti-aircraft artillery regiments), an anti-aircraft searchlight brigade (3 anti-aircraft searchlight units), a VNOS brigade (2nd regiment of VNOS), a communications regiment and a balloon barrage. On June 7, 1946, Major-General of artillery Nikolai Vasilkov (ru:Васильков, Николай Корнилович) joined the corps command.

On the basis of the Directive No. org / 3/397203 of the Chief of the General Staff of the Soviet Army of December 7, 1950 and the Directive of the Chief of the Main Headquarters of the Air Defence Forces of December 9, 1950 No. org / 1/655372 on January 1, 1951, the administration of the 5th Air Defence Corps was reorganized into the air defence commander of the Urals region [raion] of the II category. General-Lieutenant Afanasy Fedorovich Shcheglov, Hero of the Soviet Union (ru:Щеглов, Афанасий Фёдорович) was appointed as the raion commander. Colonel Lazarev Alexander Pavlovich was appointed as member of the Military Council, and Colonel Grigoryev Mikhail Mikhailovich as Chief of Staff.

In June 1954 in accordance with the decision of the Council of Ministers of the USSR and the Central Committee of the Communist Party of the Soviet Union, instead of air defence areas in the border strip and in the depths of Soviet territory, operational formations were restored (districts and armies) and operational-tactical formations (corps, air defence divisions), which included all types of air defence troops. On the basis of the Order (Prikaz) of the Minister of Defence of the USSR dated June 14, 1954, the Ural Air Defence Region of the II category was reorganised into the Ural Air Defence Army. By this time, the army had two Anti-aircraft rocket divisions (12 anti-aircraft rocket regiments and three separate anti-aircraft rocket divizions), the 43rd Air Defense Fighter Aviation Corps (two fighter aviation divisions - six fighter aviation regiments), a VNOS radio engineering regiment, a separate communications battalion and two separate communications companies, as well as support units.

In 1960 the new 4th Independent Army of the Air Defence Forces comprised the 19th Air Defence Corps (Chelyabinsk, Chelyabinsk Oblast), and the 20th Air Defence Corps (Perm, Perm Oblast). The 28th Air Defence Division joined the corps, now army, in 1963. It later included both the 681st (Danilovo) and 683rd Fighter Aviation Regiments (Bobrovka). The 19th Air Defence Corps initially included the 385th and 412th (Dombarovsky) Fighter Aviation Regiments.

On 9 April 1960 Orsk Airport was a refueling stop for Mikoyan-Gurevich MiG-19 fighter jets from Sverdlovsk attempting to intercept one of Gary Powers' U-2 flights, however one of the MiG-19s crashed on approach to Orsk.

The 20th Air Defence Corps was formed on 10 April 1960 from the 49th Fighter Aviation Corps PVO. On formation, it included the 87th Fighter Aviation Division PVO and the 77th Anti-Aircraft Artillery Division. But these two divisions were quickly broken up and brigades and regiments substituted by 1962. For nearly 30 years the 20th Air Defence Corps included the 763rd Fighter Aviation Regiment, the 764th Fighter Aviation Regiment, and the 765th Fighter Aviation Regiment PVO (Salka Aerodrome). The 201st Anti-Aircraft Rocket Regiment at Izhevsk (Udmurt ASSR) active since 1959, was transferred to Dubrovka, Moscow Oblast in 1997 and amalgamated with the 566th Anti-Aircraft Missile Regiment. The 20th Air Defence Corps itself became the 91st Air Defence Division in 1988, and was disbanded in 1998.

By a decree of the Presidium of the Supreme Soviet of the USSR of January 15, 1974, the army was awarded the Order of the Red Banner, for the great merits shown in the battles to defend the homeland, and success in combat training.

After the fall of the Soviet Union 4th Air Defence Army became the 5th Independent Air Defence Corps (in accordance with a decree issued December 1994), and later was reorganised as the 5th Independent Corps of the Air Forces and Air Defence Forces in 1998. The 683rd IAP was disbanded in 1997-98. In 2001 the formation was upgraded into the 5th Air and Air Defence Forces Army (5 A VVS i PVO).
