= Andizhan Airport =

Andijan International Airport Andijon Xalqaro Aeroporti
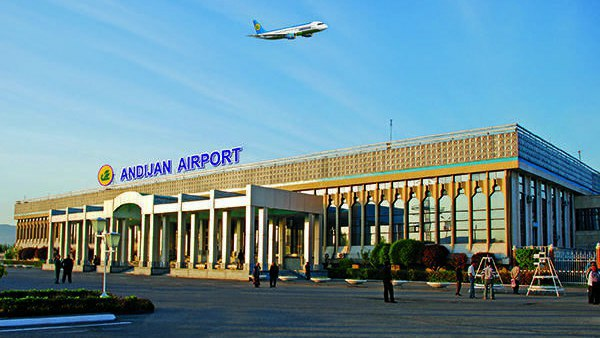
- IATA: AZN; ICAO: UZFA

Summary
- Airport type: Public
- Owner: Government of Uzbekistan
- Operator: Uzbekistan Airways
- Serves: Andijan
- Location: Andijan, Uzbekistan
- Elevation AMSL: 462 m (1,516 ft)
- Coordinates: 40°43′40″N 72°17′38″E
- Website: https://www.uzairways.com/en/flights/international-airport-andijan

Map
- Location of airport in Uzbekistan

Runways
Direction	Length		Surface
Direction	m	ft	Surface
04/22	2,978	9,770	Concrete
- Source: DAFIF

Andijan International Airport (IATA: AZN, ICAO: UZFA) is an international airport serving Andijan, the capital city of the Andijan Region in Uzbekistan.

9th Guards Fighter Aviation Regiment PVO of the Soviet Air Defence Forces arrived at the airport in November 1955. From April 1986 to October 1992 it was part of 15th Air Defence Division (12th Air Defence Army). It was taken over by the Uzbek Armed Forces in October 1992.

== History ==
In 1979, the terminal complex at Andijan Airport was commissioned, covering an area of 2,402.4 square meters with a capacity of up to 200 passengers per hour.

In March 2025, a large-scale reconstruction of the airfield complex was completed, which included the expansion of the runway, taxiways, and aprons. On March 15, 2025, the airport handled its first technical flight operated by Uzbekistan Airways from Tashkent, after which commercial scheduled operations resumed. Subsequent infrastructure upgrades included the construction of 10 stands for wide-body and large aircraft, two new taxiways, and modernized power supply, perimeter security, and airfield lighting systems.

On December 30, 2025, the Cabinet of Ministers of Uzbekistan issued a resolution regarding the construction of a new passenger terminal. The project was launched directly by Uzbekistan Airports without using a public-private partnership model. Following a competitive tender, a construction contract was signed on February 5, 2026, with the general contractor MARIN BUSINESS TRADE LLC (with PRIME TOWER GROUP LLC serving as the general designer).

The upgraded airfield infrastructure allowed the facility to accommodate larger aircraft types. On July 3, 2026, the airport handled its first scheduled wide-body passenger flight, an Airbus A330 operated by Flyadeal from Medina.On August 4, 2026, the airport received its first Boeing 747-400F freighter, operated by Challenge Air Cargo.

Construction of the new terminal is scheduled for completion by the end of 2026. The new facility will cover 19,650 square meters, increasing the airport's hourly capacity to 1,000 passengers and enabling an estimated annual throughput of up to 1 million passengers.

== Facilities ==
The airport is 1,515 feet (462 m) above mean sea level. It has one runway designated 04/22 with a concrete surface measuring 2,978 by 38 metres (9,770 ft × 125 ft).

== Airlines and destinations ==
After the renovation is completed, new international routes will be added to attract more tourists to Andijan and Fergana. Major routes will include destinations in the United Arab Emirates, Saudi Arabia, Russia, India, and the United Kingdom.

Airlines	Destinations
Centrum Air	Novosibirsk
Flykhiva	Seasonal charter: Medina
FlyOne	Jeddah, Medina
Pegasus Airlines	Istanbul-Sabiha Gökçen (begins 18 December 2026)
S7 Airlines	Irkutsk, Novosibirsk
Silk Avia	Tashkent
Uzbekistan Airways	Istanbul, Moscow–Vnukovo, Novosibirsk, Saint Petersburg, Tashkent

== See also ==
- List of the busiest airports in the former USSR
- Transportation in Uzbekistan
