= 763rd Fighter Aviation Regiment =

- Active: 1952–1998
- Country: Soviet Union
- Branch: Soviet Air Force
- Type: Aviation regiment
- Garrison/HQ: Yugorsk-2

Aircraft flown
- MiG-17; MiG-31

The 763rd Fighter Aviation Regiment was a regiment of the Soviet Air Defence Forces and then the Russian Air Defence Forces from 1952 to 1998.

== History ==
The regiment began to form at Bolshoye Savino Airport near Perm. Personnel for staffing numbers have grown from parts of the country's air defense fighter aircraft. Regimentation began under Colonel IZ Galiushin. The formation continued under Colonel AE Grebennikov, who assumed command of the regiment. Regimentation was completed November 7, 1952, and the unit became part of the 87th Fighter Aviation Division PVO in the Ural region. This date is the day to commemorate the formation of the regiment set annual holiday.

On March 17, 1953, the 763rd Fighter Regiment began receiving Mikoyan-Gurevich MiG-15 jet fighter aircraft.

On July 5, 1953, the commander of the Air Defense Regiment Ural region was handed the battle-flag section.

On October 1, 1955, one air squadron of the regiment moved to a new full-time organization in connection with its forthcoming rearmament on Yak-25 aircraft.

From 1 January 1958 the regiment assigned to the first line and is called the 763rd Fighter Aviation Regiment of the first line. Its task was protecting the northern borders of the country.

In 1962, the village Komsomol (now known as Yugorsk as of July 1992) was founded nearby the place of dislocation Regiment – Yugorsk 2. During mid-1969, half of the regiment was deployed to Zavitinsk as a result of increased tensions with Communist China. In 1983 the regiment began using Mikoyan MiG-31 long-range interceptor aircraft. In the 1980s the regiment was part of 20th Air Defence Corps, 4th Independent Air Defence Army. The regiment was disbanded in 1998.

== Notes ==
- City Paper "Ugra Messenger" from 06.07.2002g.
