= Yugorsk Sovetsky (air base) =

Airport in Yugorsk, Russia

Yugorsk Sovetsky Yugorsk-2 Komsomolskiy
- Yugorsk, Khanty-Mansi Autonomous Okrug in Russia
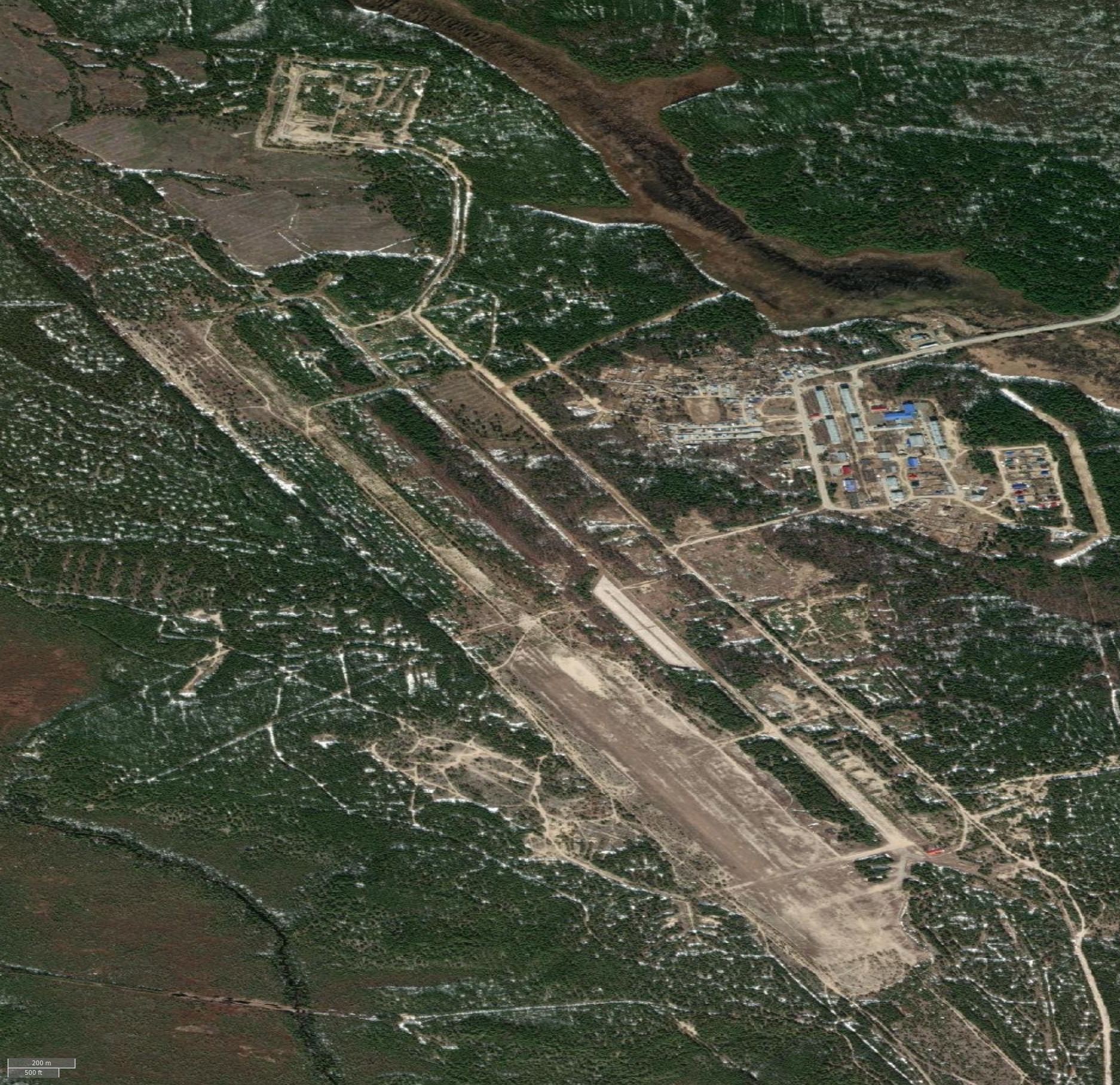
- Satellite imagery of Yugorsk Sovetsky

Site information
- Type: Air Base
- Owner: Ministry of Defence
- Operator: Russian Air Force

Location
- Shown within Khanty-Mansi Autonomous Okrug Yugorsk Sovetsky (Russia)
- Coordinates: 61°16′6″N 63°8′18″E

Site history
- Built: 1952
- In use: 1952 - 1998

Airfield information
- Identifiers: ICAO: XSSJ
- Elevation: 114 metres (374 ft) AMSL
Runways
Direction	Length and surface
14/32	<2,500 metres (8,202 ft) Concrete

Yugorsk Sovetsky (also Pionerskiy, Komsomolskiy-2, or Yugorsk-2) is an air base in Russia located 11 km southwest of Yugorsk.

The 763rd Fighter Aviation Regiment (763 IAP PVO) was formed here in 1952 and initially used the Yakovlev Yak-9 until 1953 when it was replaced by the Mikoyan-Gurevich MiG-15bis (NATO: Fagot). This was replaced by the Mikoyan-Gurevich MiG-17 (NATO: Fresco) in 1957, being used until 1966. The Yakovlev Yak-25 (NATO: Flashlight) was used between 1955 and 1966 by one squadron. The MiG17 was replaced by the Yakovlev Yak-28P (NATO: Firebar) in 1966 and in turn this was replaced by the Mikoyan MiG-31 (NATO: Foxhound) interceptor in 1983.

The regiment was disbanded in 1998. A Mikoyan-Gurevich MiG-25 (NATO: Foxbat) is on display in the town of Yugorsk.

Currently the airfield is used for general aviation service to Yugorsk.

== See also ==
- List of military airbases in Russia
- ru:763 истребительный авиационный полк
