= Alt Daber Airfield =

Abandoned military air base

Old Dabber Airfield Wittstock Air Base
- IATA: SHA; ICAO: ETxx

Summary
- Airport type: Military
- Operator: German Luftwaffe followed by Soviet Air Force
- Location: 3.5 km NE of Wittstock, Germany
- Built: 1934
- In use: 1934 - 1994
- Commander: Lieutenant-General Sawitzki
- Occupants: 1934-1945 German Luftwaffe. 1945-1994 Soviet 33 Fighter Regiment
- Coordinates: 53°12′08″N 012°31′21″E

Map
- Location of airport in Brandenburg Old Dabber Airfield; Wittstock Air Base (Germany)

Runways
Direction	Length		Surface
Direction	ft	m	Surface
08/26	2,400	732	concrete

The Old Daber Airfield (also known as Wittstock Air Base), is an abandoned military air base located just outside the town of Wittstock in the Ostprignitz-Ruppin district, in north-western Brandenburg, Germany.

== History ==
From 1934, under Nazi-air skills initiative to revive the Luftwaffe, the site served as a glider field. From 1938 it was developed formally as a Luftwaffe airfield, with building extensions stopping in 1940. By this time the southern section of the site was linked to the railway at Groß Haßlow.

On 3 May 1945, the Red Army overran the airfield, and occupied the site. From this point forward, several units of the Soviet Air Force were stationed at the site which was now part of East Germany. After extending the runway to 2,400 metres (7,900 ft), the Soviet military added a radar site near Biesen to the west, and a surface-to-air missile site near Wernikow. From 1961, the attached air regiments included the 33 IAP (Jagdfliegerregiment/Fighter Regiment), equipped with MiG-29 (ASSC Fulcrum-A/B) fighter and the MiG-23UM Flogger-C operational trainer. The regiment was part of the 16th Guards Fighter Aviation Division within the 16th Air Army with headquarters in Damgarten.

With the reunification of Germany from 1989/1990, the Soviet Army agreed to return all bases by the end of 1994. The airfield was handed back to the district authorities on 20 June 1994. The airfield was then used for a time by the Bundeswehr, before being abandoned.

== Present ==
After abandonment, the airfield served as a race track, during which the fauna and flora of the heathland began to take over the facilities.

It was also used to host a series of electronic music festivals, including FULLmoOON festival.

Local plans for the 135 acres (55 ha) site propose the development of a photovoltaic cell storage plant, with a power of 50MW.
