= Aircraft Repair Plant No 405 =

Aircraft maintenance facility in Kazakhstan

JSC Aircraft Repair Plant No. 405 (Авиационный ремонтный завод, ARZ-405), is a military contractor and joint-stock company in Almaty, Kazakhstan, which performs repair and maintenance services for military helicopters such as the Mi-8 helicopter and its modifications for both Kazakhstan and Russia. It is the largest aircraft repair facility in Central Asia.

Its main plant is next door to Almaty International Airport. As of 2018, it had 360 employees. ARZ-405 also owns another plant in Aktobe called Aircraft Repair Plant No. 406.

== History ==
ARZ-405 was established in 1939 at the Alma-Ata Airfield (now Almaty International Airport) under the Soviet Ministry of Civil Aviation for the repair of civil aircraft including the Ju 52/3m, Li-2, An-2, Mi-8, and Yak-52. In 1977, it began servicing Soviet Ka-26 helicopters.

Under perestroika, ARZ-405 became a joint-stock company. In 1992, following the dissolution of the Soviet Union, it began providing repair services to various government ministries of Kazakhstan.

In 2019, the Kazakh and Russian governments signed an agreement to begin producing civilian variants of the Mi-8 at Aircraft Repair Plant No. 405 beginning in 2020. In 2022, the Kazakh Ministry of Industry and Infrastructural Development announced that ARZ-405 would begin producing Mi-171Sh military helicopters as well.

Between 2020 and 2021, six Mi-8AMT helicopters were assembled by ARZ-405 and delivered to the Ministry of Emergency Situations in a joint effort with Russian Helicopters.

During the Russo-Ukrainian war, ARZ-405 was accused by Ukrainian NGO StateWatch of helping evade international sanctions against Russia by acting as an intermediary for the repair of Mi-8 helicopters.

== See also ==
- ru:Список авиационных заводов России - List of aircraft factories in Russia
