= Oktyabrsky, Vaninsky District, Khabarovsk Krai =

Urban locality in Khabarovsk Krai, Russia

Coordinates: 49°03′45″N 140°14′20″E

Oktyabrsky (Russian: Октябрьский) is an urban-type settlement in Vaninsky District, Khabarovsk Krai, Russia. Population: 6,240 (2010 census); 6,524 (2002 census); 7,966 (1989 Soviet census).

The former Postovaya (air base) is located nearby.
