= Salka Aerodrome =

Experimental aerodrome in Russia

Salka
- Салка
- Near Nizhny Tagil in Russia
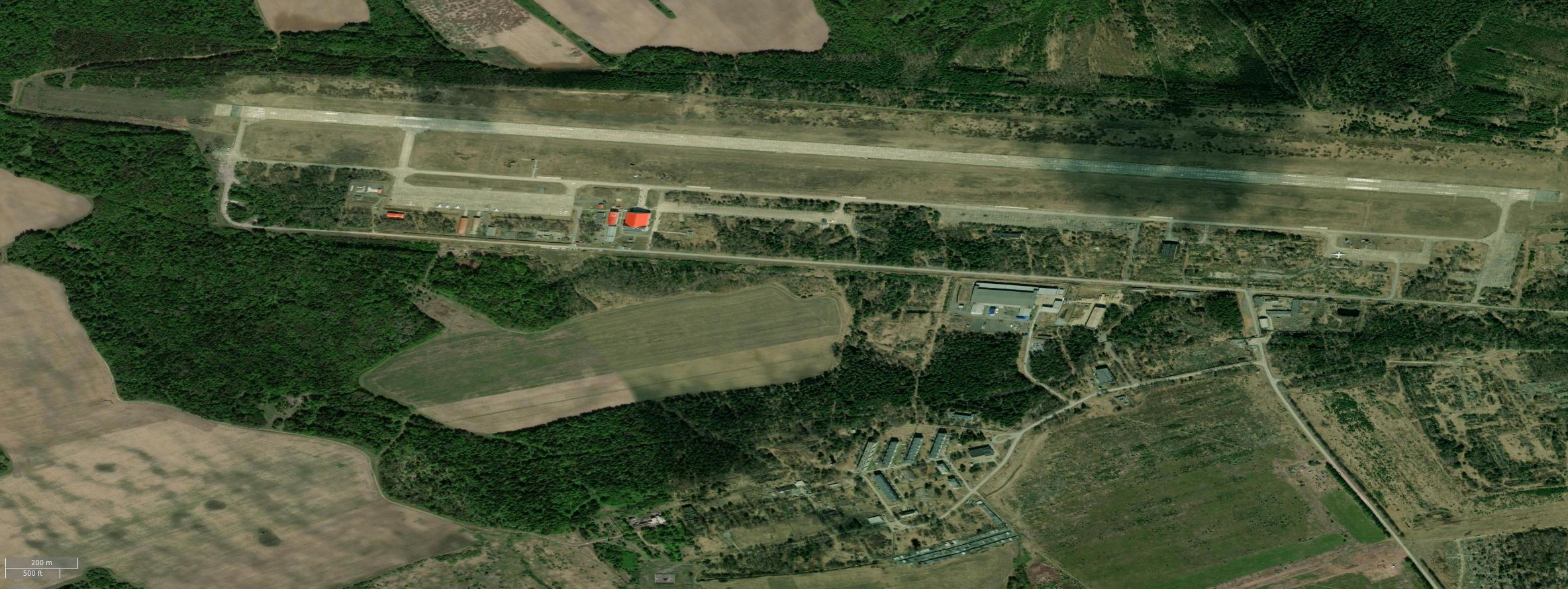
- Satellite imagery of Salka Aerodrome

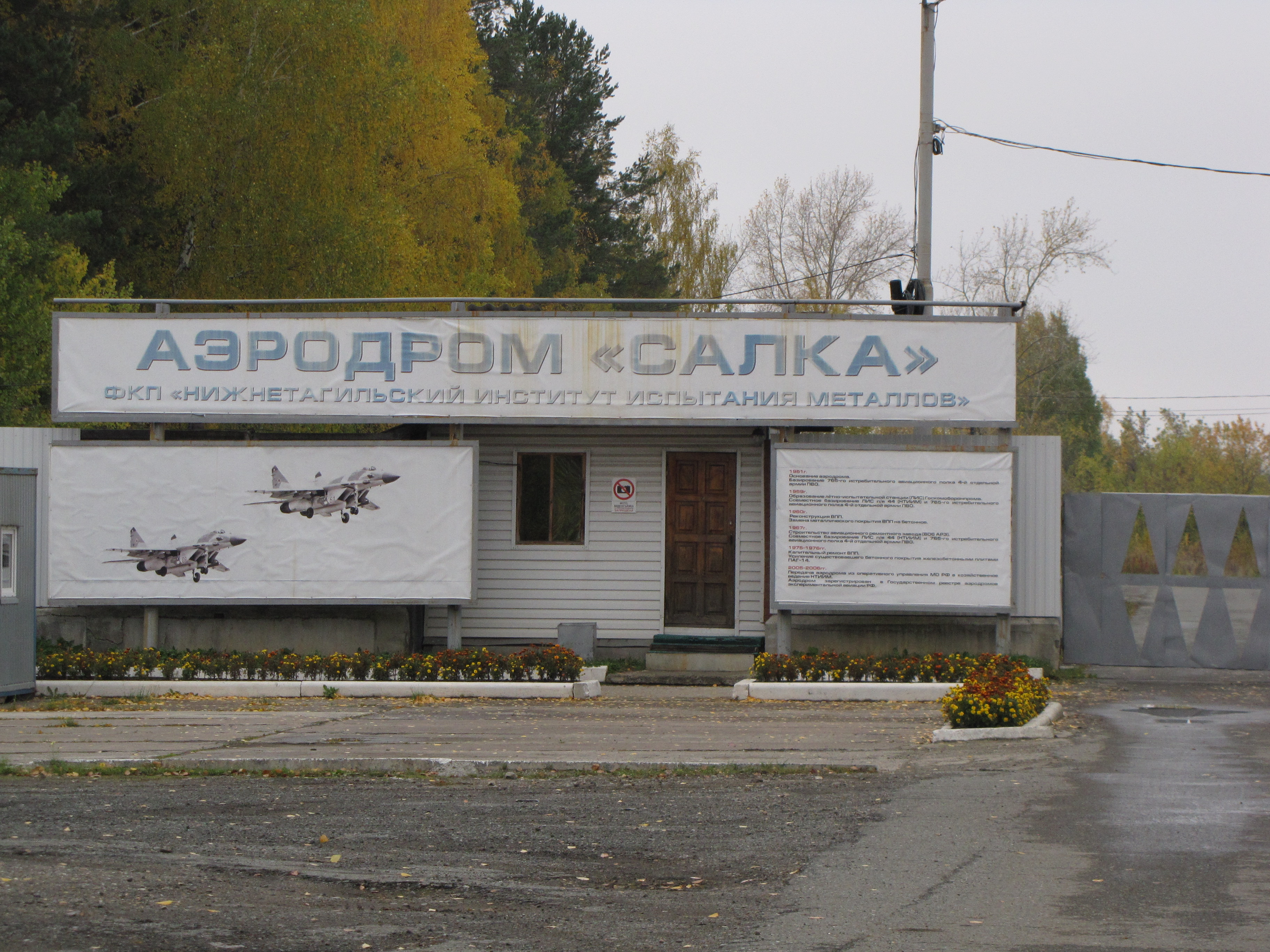
- Aerodrome check-point

Site information
- Type: experimental
- Owner: Russian Federation, Ministry of Industry and Trade
- Operator: Nizhny Tagil Institute of Metal Testing
- Controlled by: Flight Test Base of the Nizhny Tagil Institute of Metal Testing
- Condition: operational
- Website: www.ntiim.ru (in Russian)

Location
- Location in Sverdlovsk Oblast Salka (Russia)
- Coordinates: 57°59′18″N 060°14′6″E

Site history
- Built: 1953
- Events: Cold War; Russian Expo Arms

Airfield information
- Identifiers: IATA: none, ICAO: none, LID: ЬССН (in Russian)
- Elevation: 270 metres (886 ft) AMSL
Runways
Direction	Length and surface
	2,500 metres (8,202 ft) Concrete

Salka Aerodrome (also Nizhny Tagil Salka) is an aerodrome in Russia located 17 km northeast of Nizhny Tagil. Until 1994 the airfield was home to the 765th Fighter Aviation Regiment (765 IAP) initially operated the Sukhoi Su-9 (Fishpot) in the 1960s and 1970s. The regiment replaced it in 1980 with the MiG-23P (Flogger-G). From 1964 till 1994, the regiment was part of the 20th Air Defence Corps of the 4th Independent Air Defence Army. The 765 IAP was disbanded in 1994.

Currently the airfield used as experimental aerodrome operated by the Nizhny Tagil Institute of Metal Testing.

== See also ==
- List of airports in Russia
