= Zolotaya Dolina (air base) =

Former Russian air force airbase

Zolotaya Dolina Unashi
- Nakhodka, Primorsky Krai in Russia

Site information
- Type: Air Base
- Owner: Ministry of Defence
- Operator: Russian Air Force

Location
- Shown within Primorsky Krai Zolotaya Dolina (Russia)
- Coordinates: 42°57′44″N 133°06′56″E

Site history
- Built: 1951
- In use: 1951 - 1998

Airfield information
- Elevation: 10 metres (33 ft) AMSL
Runways
Direction	Length and surface
02/20	2,500 metres (8,202 ft) Concrete

Zolotaya Dolina is a former airbase of the Russian Air Force located near Nakhodka, Primorsky Krai, Russia.

The base was home to the 47th Fighter Aviation Regiment between 1951 and 1998, and the 781st Fighter Aviation Regiment between 1953 and 1958.
