= Mengon (air base) =

Military airport in Amur Oblast, Russia

- IATA: none; ICAO: ZA33

Summary
- Airport type: Military
- Operator: Russian Air Force
- Location: Elban
- Elevation AMSL: 164 ft / 50 m
- Coordinates: 50°2′0″N 136°18′0″E

Map
- Location in Khabarovsk Krai Mengon (Russia) Mengon (Asia)

Runways
Direction	Length		Surface
Direction	ft	m	Surface
	10,892	3,320	Concrete

Mengon is an air base in Amur Oblast, Russia located 17 km southwest of Elban. Its purpose is unknown; it may be a diversion or dispersal airbase for bombers from Zavitinsk (air base) or Ukrainka (air base). It has a very long runway and large tarmac. Long runway was designated as a "eastern alternate airport" for landing the Buran spacecraft.
