= Krasnodar (air base) =

Airport in Krasnodar Krai, Russia

Krasnodar
- Krasnodar, Krasnodar Krai in Russia
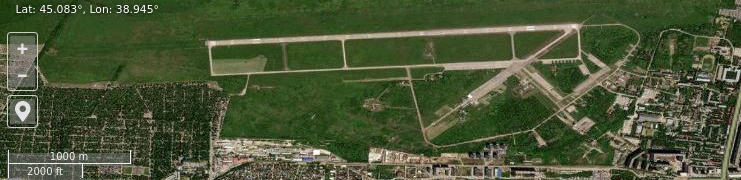
- Satellite imagery of Krasnodar air base

Site information
- Type: Air Base
- Owner: Ministry of Defence
- Operator: Russian Air Force

Location
- Shown within Krasnodar Krai Krasnodar (Russia)
- Coordinates: 45°04′57″N 38°56′43″E

Site history
- Built: 1952
- In use: 1952 - present

Airfield information
- Elevation: 10 metres (33 ft) AMSL
Runways
Direction	Length and surface
08/26	2,500 metres (8,202 ft) Concrete

Krasnodar is a Russian Air Force airbase located northwest of Krasnodar, Krasnodar Krai, Russia.

The base is home to the 275th Aviation Repair Plant, and formerly home to the 802nd Training Aviation Regiment between 1952 and 1993 which flew the Sukhoi Su-25 (ASCC: Frogfoot) and the Aero L-39 Albatros.

== See also ==
- List of military airbases in Russia
