= Postovaya (air base) =

Airport in Khabarovsk Krai, Russia

Postovaya
- Russian: Постовая
- Oktyabrsky, Khabarovsk Krai in Russia
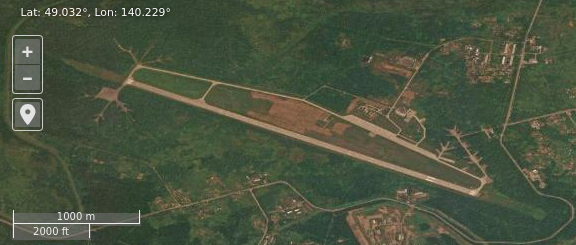
- Satellite imagery of former Postovaya air base

Site information
- Type: Air Base
- Owner: Ministry of Defence
- Operator: Russian Air Force

Location
- Shown within Khabarovsk Krai Postovaya (Russia)
- Coordinates: 49°01′56″N 140°13′44″E

Site history
- Built: 1943
- In use: 1943 - 1994

Airfield information
- Elevation: 10 metres (33 ft) AMSL
Runways
Direction	Length and surface
13/31	2,500 metres (8,202 ft) Concrete

Postovaya (Russian: Постовая) is a former airbase of the Russian Air Force located near Oktyabrsky, Khabarovsk Krai, Russia.

The base was home to the 41st Fighter Aviation Regiment between 1943 and 1983 along with the 308th Fighter Aviation Regiment between 1983 and 1994.

== See also ==
- List of military airbases in Russia
