= Gorelovo (rural locality) =

Gorelovo (Russian: Горе́лово) is the name of several rural localities in Russia:

- Gorelovo, Chekhovsky District, Moscow Oblast, a village in Stremilovskoye Rural Settlement of Chekhovsky District of Moscow Oblast
- Gorelovo, Shatursky District, Moscow Oblast, a village in Pyshlitskoye Rural Settlement of Shatursky District of Moscow Oblast
- Gorelovo, Nizhny Novgorod Oblast, a village in Krasnoslobodsky Selsoviet of the town of Bor, Nizhny Novgorod Oblast
- Gorelovo, Pskov Oblast, a village in Sebezhsky District of Pskov Oblast
- Gorelovo, Yaroslavl Oblast, a selo in Gorelovsky Rural Okrug of Breytovsky District of Yaroslavl Oblast
