= 12th Independent Air Defense Army =

- Active: 1963–1980; 1986–1992
- Country: Soviet Union
- Branch: Soviet Air Defence Forces
- Type: Air defense
- Headquarters: Tashkent

The 12th Independent Air Defense Army (Russian: 12-я отдельная армия ПВО) was an army of the Soviet Air Defense Forces based in Soviet Central Asia from 1963, with six years' break in the early 1980s, until 1992.

== History ==
The headquarters of the 12th Independent Air Defense Army was formed from the headquarters of the 30th Independent Air Defense Corps in May 1963 in accordance with a directive issued in January of that year, under the command of corps commander Lieutenant General Yuri Votintsev. The 30th Independent Air Defense Corps was formed in May 1960 from the Turkestan Air Defense Corps, formed in July and August 1954. Headquartered at Tashkent, the army was responsible for the air defense of the bulk of Soviet Central Asia, except for the Caspian Sea coast under the 16th Guards Air Defense Division of the Baku Air Defense District at Krasnovodsk and East Kazakhstan under the 33rd Air Defense Division of the 14th Independent Air Defense Army at Semipalatinsk.

From west to east, the army included the 17th Air Defense Division at Mary, Turkmenistan, the 15th Air Defense Division at Samarkand, Uzbekistan and the 7th Air Defense Division at Alma-Ata, Kazakhstan (covering most of Kazakhstan and Kyrgyzstan). The 737th Fighter Aviation Regiment was located in Priozersk, Kazakhstan (in Dzhambul Oblast) [46 01 40N, 73 29 27E], from November 1960 to December 1983. It joined the 7th Air Defense Division in 1963. A move to Ayaguz, Semipalatinsk Oblast, began in December 1983, and the transfer was completed in April 1984. The regiment remained at Ayaguz [47 55 14N, 80 27 02E] until October 1989.

The headquarters of the 15th Air Defense Division was formed at Yelets in 1960 from that of the 328th Fighter Aviation Division PVO and relocated to Samarkand in 1964 and 1965 without its units, taking control of air defense units in Uzbekistan and Tajikistan in spring 1965. Colonel General Pavel Shevelev became army commander in October 1967 and was succeeded by Lieutenant General Vitold Ryabtsev in October 1977.

During the PVO reorganization of the early 1980s, the 12th Independent Air Defense Army and the Baku Air Defense District were disbanded. As a result, the air defense units in Turkmenistan were combined under the new 24th Independent Air Defense Corps formed from the 17th Air Defense Division at Mary while the headquarters of the 37th Independent Air Defense Corps was formed in Alma-Ata from that of the 7th Air Defense Division. The area of responsibility of the latter continued to exclude Semipalatinsk Oblast and the rest of East Kazakhstan. The aviation regiments formerly part of the army were transferred to the Air Force of the Central Asian Military District, and the ground air defense units came under the district air defense directorate. The army was reformed during February and March 1986 with headquarters in its former location at Tashkent, controlling the 24th and 37th Air Defense Corps and the 15th Air Defense Division. In 1988, the 24th Air Defense Corps reverted to its previous designation, the 17th Air Defense Division. The army was disbanded after the dissolution of the Soviet Union, and in mid-1992 the headquarters of the 37th Air Defense Corps became that of the Kazakh Air Defense Forces. Russian personnel of the army departed, but the armed forces of the newly independent Central Asian former Soviet republics – Kazakhstan, Turkmenistan, Uzbekistan, Tajikistan, and Kyrgyzstan – were largely left with the equipment of the units that had been stationed on what became their territory.

== Post-1986 structure ==
The structure of the army after 1986 was as follows:

- 24th Air Defense Corps (became 17th Air Defense Division 1988), Mary, Turkmen SSR
  - 152nd Fighter Aviation Regiment, Ak-Tepe, Ashgabat, MiG-23M
  - 179th Guards Fighter Aviation Regiment, Nebit-Dag, MiG-23M
  - 587th Anti-Aircraft Missile Regiment, Krasnovodsk, four S-75M3 battalions at Krasnovodsk and two S-200V battalions in the vicinity of Avaza
  - 1st Guards Anti-Aircraft Missile Regiment, Ashgabat (Kurtli), three S-75 battalions and two S-125 battalions
  - 148th Guards Anti-Aircraft Missile Regiment, Mary-2, four S-75 battalions at Mary-2 and two S-200V battalions in the vicinity of Murgab
  - 34th Anti-Aircraft Missile Regiment, Chardzhou, three S-75 battalions
  - 12th Radio-Technical Brigade, Mary
  - 43rd Radio-Technical Brigade, Krasnovodsk
- 15th Air Defense Division, Samarkand, Uzbek SSR
  - 9th Guards Fighter Aviation Regiment, Andijan, Uzbek SSR, Su-15TM (Su-27 from 1990)
  - 81st Anti-Aircraft Missile Brigade, Samarkand, six S-75 battalions on a line from Bukhara to Kattakurgan and three S-125 battalions of which two were part of the Samarkand air defenses
  - 74th Anti-Aircraft Missile Brigade, Tashkent, Uzbek SSR, four S-75 battalions, two S-125 battalions, and a group of two S-200 battalions at Yangiyul)
  - 536th Anti-Aircraft Missile Regiment, Dushanbe, Tajik SSR, three S-75 and three S-125M1 battalions
  - 840th Anti-Aircraft Missile Regiment, Uchkyzyl near Termez, Uzbek SSR, three S-125 battalions
  - 133rd Radio-Technical Brigade, Dushanbe
  - 32nd Radio-Technical Regiment, Andijan
- 37th Air Defense Corps, Alma-Ata, Kazakh SSR
  - 737th Fighter Aviation Regiment, Ayaguz, MiG-23MLD, relocated to Odessa Military District fall 1989
  - 561st Guards Anti-Aircraft Missile Regiment, Shevchenko, three S-200 battalions
  - 769th Anti-Aircraft Missile Regiment, Leninsk, Two S-75 battalions and three S-200 battalions
  - 420th Anti-Aircraft Missile Regiment, Stepnoye near Karaganda, elements included two S-200 battalions near Saran
  - 145th Guards Anti-Aircraft Missile Brigade, Frunze, Four S-75 and three S-125 battalions, Senezh control system
  - 87th Anti-Aircraft Missile Brigade, Almaty, Pervomayskiye Prudy, S-75, S-125, and S-200V (two battalions near Komsomol), Vektor-2M control system
  - 51st Anti-Aircraft Missile Brigade, became 1022nd Anti-Aircraft Missile Regiment 1988, Sary Shagan, Three S-75 and two S-200V battalions
  - 42nd Radio-Technical Brigade, Alma-Ata
