= Bobrovka (air base) =

Military air base in Samara Oblast, Russia

Bobrovka
- Kinel, Samara Oblast in Russia
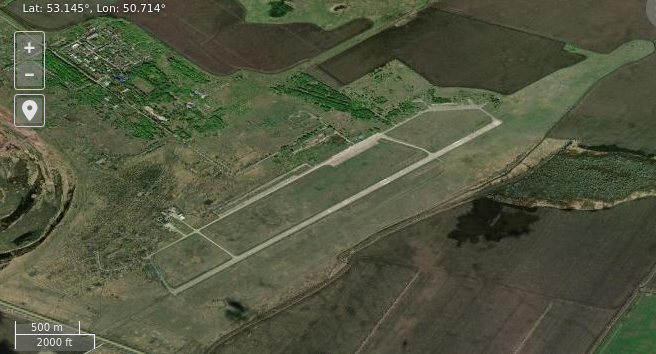
- Satellite imagery of the former Bobrovka airbase

Site information
- Type: Air Base
- Owner: Ministry of Defence
- Operator: Russian Armed Forces

Location
- Shown within Samara Oblast Bobrovka (Russia)
- Coordinates: 53°08′42″N 050°42′52″E

Airfield information
- Elevation: 112 metres (367 ft) AMSL
Runways
Direction	Length and surface
04/22	2,500 metres (8,202 ft) Concrete

Bobrovka was a military air base in Samara Oblast, Russia, and is now a civilian airfield. It is located 39 km east of the city of Samara. The base largely served the interceptor role for the Soviet Air Defence Force, and from 1960 was part of 4th Independent Air Defence Army.

Currently, it is not used as a military airfield, in fact it is only a sports airfield - since 2000, the Samara regional flying club of the Russian DOSAAF has been based there.

Near the airfield there is the village of Oktyabrsky, which is part of the rural settlement of Bobrovka, which previously served as a military townlet to accommodate military personnel from military units based at the airfield, as well as their families.

Bobrovka had been observed by 1957 by U.S. Lockheed U-2 overflights. A 1974 US satellite mission identified up to 89 swept-wing aircraft, most of which were likely Sukhoi Su-9 (NATO: Fishpot) aircraft. By 1981 the interceptor regiment was one of four in the USSR still operating the Su-9.

Bobrovka became the Soviet Union's primary storage facility for the aging Su-9, and by 1981 at least 243 Su-9 aircraft were observed parked at Bobrovka.

The base was home to the:

- 683rd Fighter Aviation Regiment between 1952 and 1997

With the dissolution of the Soviet Union the regiment became part of the Russian Air Defence Forces.

237th Independent Helicopter Squadron (Military Unit Number 34395) equipped with Mi-8 and Mi-24 helicopters, was created in 1998 on the basis of the disbanded 437th and 95th training helicopter regiments, based in Ozinki and Serdobsk, respectively (the latter was based at the Tashchilovka airfield, now closed, near the railway station of the same name). Initially, two detachments were formed (Mi-8 detachment and Mi-24 detachment). In 2001, the unit was joined by the 1st squadron (Mi-24 helicopters) from the 793rd separate transport and combat helicopter regiment (military unit 62977), based in the area of the village of Kinel-Cherkassy (based at the airfield of the same name, now abandoned). The squadron was reorganized into a link structure (three Mi-24 flights and one Mi-8 flight). In 2010, the squadron was disbanded.

== See also ==
- List of military airbases in Russia
