= Sredne Belaya (air base) =

Former airfield in Russia

Sredne Belaya
- Srednebelaya, Amur Oblast in Russia

Site information
- Type: Air Base
- Owner: Ministry of Defence
- Operator: Russian Air Force

Location
- Shown within Amur Oblast Sredne Belaya (Russia)
- Coordinates: 50°41′31″N 128°00′39″E

Site history
- Built: 1953
- In use: 1953 - 2007

Airfield information
- Elevation: 10 metres (33 ft) AMSL
Runways
Direction	Length and surface
16/34	500 metres (1,640 ft) Concrete

Sredne Belaya is a former Russian Air Force airbase located near Srednebelaya, Amur Oblast, Russia.

The base was home to the 194th Guards Military-Transport Aviation Regiment which used the Lisunov Li-2 between 1953 and 1960 and the 825th Independent Helicopter Regiment between 1968 and 1982 with the Mil Mi-8.
