= Srednebelaya =

Srednebelaya Среднебелая
- Selo
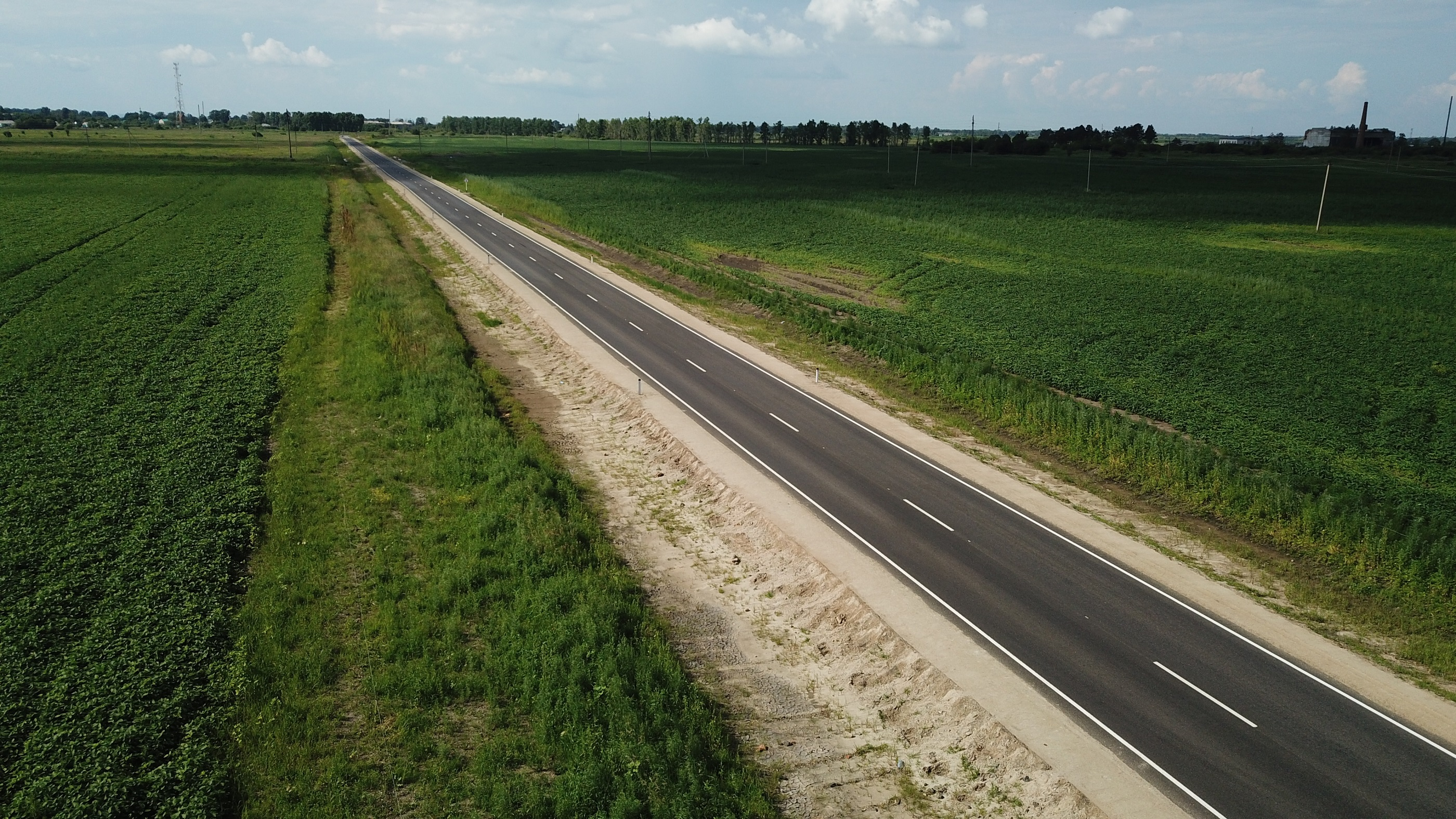
- The selo is in the background

- Location within Amur Oblast Location within Russia
- Coordinates: 50°39′N 128°00′E
- Country: Russia
- Region: Amur Oblast
- District: Ivanovsky District
- Time zone: UTC+9:00

Srednebelaya (Russian: Среднебелая) is a rural locality (a selo) and the administrative center of Srednebelovsky Selsoviet of Ivanovsky District, Amur Oblast, Russia. The population was 3,828 as of 2018. There are 31 streets.

The former Sredne Belaya (air base) is located nearby.

== Geography ==
Srednebelaya is located 45 km north of Ivanovka (the district's administrative centre) by road. Polevoye is the nearest rural locality.
