= Sharomy (air base) =

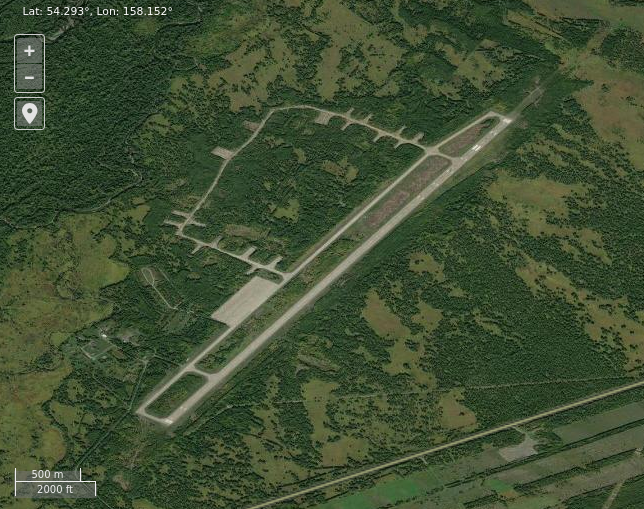
- Satellite imagery of Sharomy air base
- IATA: none; ICAO: XHPN

Summary
- Airport type: Military
- Operator: Russian Air Force
- Location: Sharomy
- Elevation AMSL: 149 m / 489 ft
- Coordinates: 54°17′36″N 158°9′6″E

Map
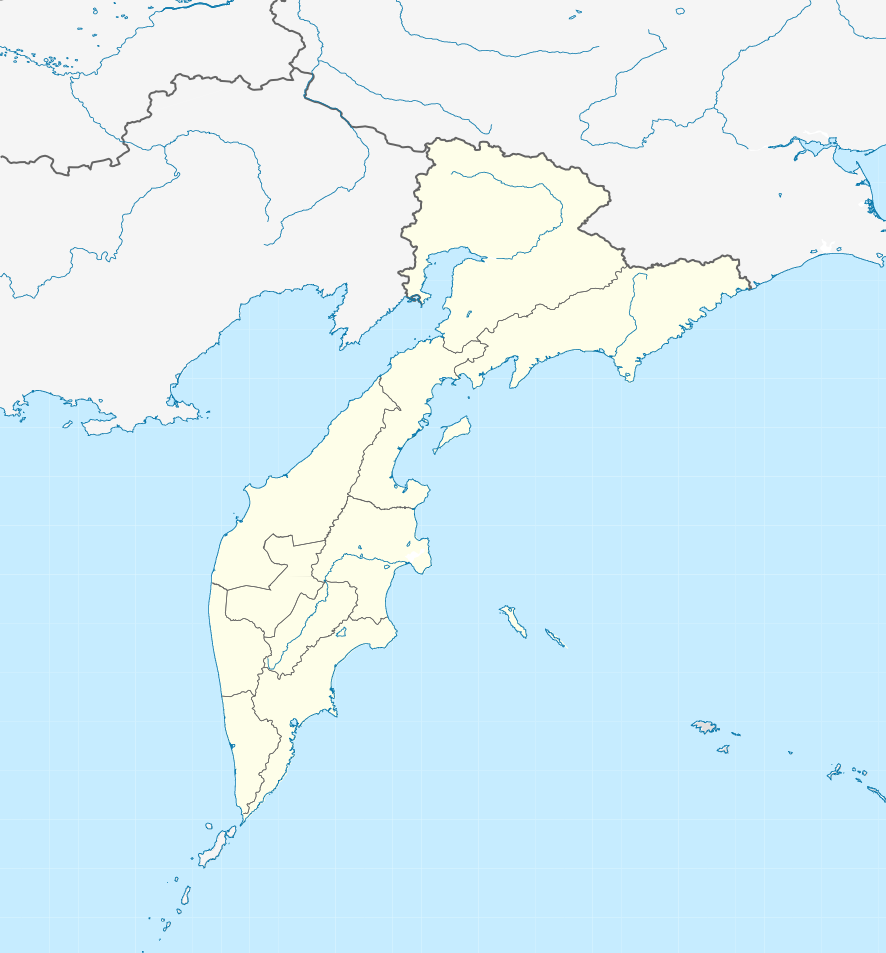
- Location of airport in Kamchatka Krai XHPN (Russia)

Runways
Direction	Length		Surface
Direction	ft	m	Surface
04/22	11,483	3,500	Concrete

Sharomy (Russian: Шаромы) (also referred to as Sheromy) is a Naval air base in Kamchatka Krai, Russia located about 143 km north of Petropavlovsk-Kamchatsky. Sharomy contains hardstands for 12 bombers and 3 fighters. It is believed to have served as a dispersal airfield for Soviet Naval Aviation, and may also be a staging airfield for Long Range Aviation.

The US intelligence community noted the first appearance of military aircraft at the airfield in September 1967, when three Tupolev Tu-16 were identified on KH-4 satellite imagery. The same report listed the airfield as having a 9950 x 250 ft (3000 x 75 m) graded earth runway and limited support facilities, however the runway was paved and the airfield expanded in the late 1960s or 1970s.

A US intelligence report noted a Naval Aviation Tu-16K Badger-G at the airfield in 1979.

Satellite imagery from early 2018 showed that the runway is plowed in the wintertime, indicating the base remains operational or in caretaker status.
