= 761st Training Aviation Regiment =

761st Fighter Aviation Regiment (1942–1950); 761st Fighter Aviation Regiment PVO (1950–1965); 761st Training Aviation Regiment (1965–2009)
- Active: 1942–present
- Country: Soviet Union; Russia
- Branch: Soviet Air Forces; Soviet Air Defense Forces; Russian Air Defense Forces; Russian Air Force; Russian Aerospace Forces
- Type: Aviation regiment
- Garrison/HQ: Khanskaya
- Engagements: World War II
- Decorations: Order of Suvorov 3rd class; Order of Kutuzov 3rd class
- Honorifics: Polotsk

The 761st Fighter Aviation Regiment (Russian: 761-й истребительный авиационный полк) was a fighter regiment (IAP) of the Soviet Air Force during World War II that became part of the Soviet Air Defense Force (PVO) during the Cold War as the 761st Fighter Aviation Regiment PVO. Converted to the 761st Training Aviation Regiment in 1965, it became part of the Russian Air Force after the Dissolution of the Soviet Union and was disbanded in 2009 as a result of military reforms before being re-activated as part of the Russian Aerospace Forces.

== World War II ==
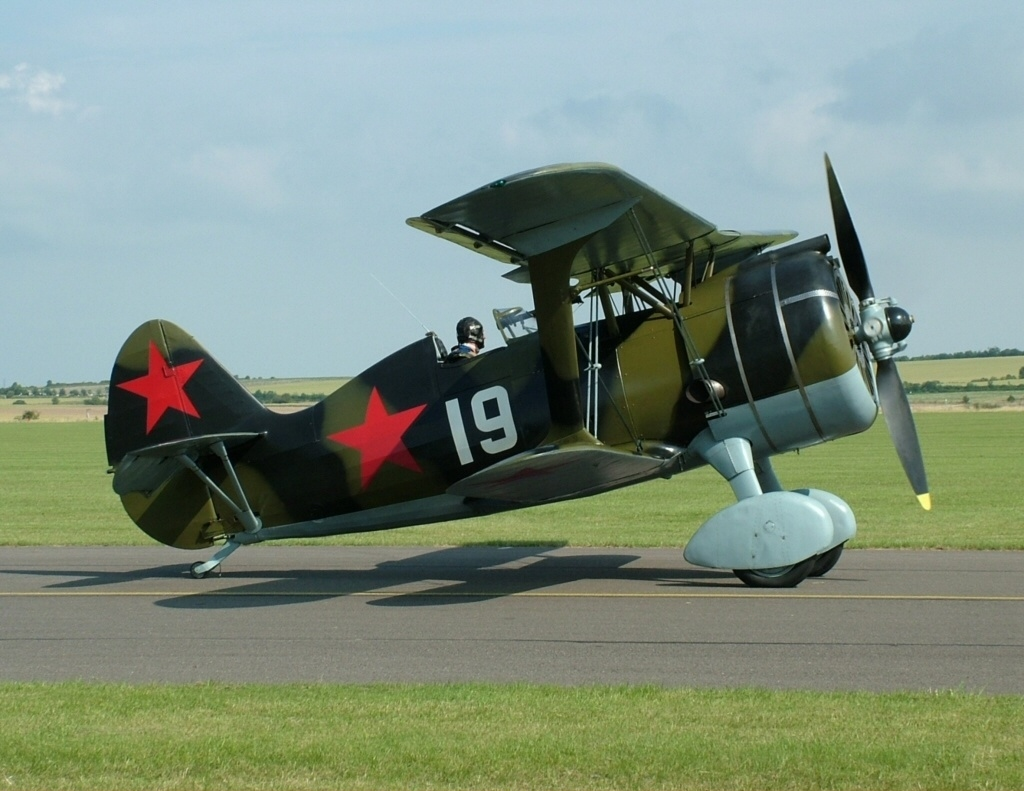
An I-15bis of the type first operated by the regiment

The regiment began forming on 4 January 1942 at the railway station of Geok Tepe near Ashgabat in the Turkmen Soviet Socialist Republic from instructor pilots of the evacuated Odessa and Chernigov Military Aviation Schools of Pilots. Assigned to the Air Forces (VVS) of the Central Asian Military District, it included two aviation squadrons with an authorized strength of twenty combat aircraft. Equipped with obsolete Polikarpov I-15bis biplanes, it became part of the 136th Mixed Aviation Division of the district VVS at the end of its formation on 28 January.

The 761st IAP remained in Central Asia until January 1943, when it was reorganized to include three aviation squadrons with an authorized strength of 32 combat aircraft (ten per squadron with two in headquarters flight). Leaving its biplanes to the 385th Fighter Aviation Regiment, it departed for retraining on the newer Yakovlev Yak-7B with the 5th Reserve Aviation Brigade of the Siberian Military District, arriving there on 5 March.

After the end of its retraining, the 761st IAP was sent to the Voronezh Front, where it was assigned to the 294th Fighter Aviation Division (IAD) of the 4th Fighter Aviation Corps (IAK) of the 2nd Air Army between 9 and 28 July, but did not participate in combat missions. During this period, on 11 July, the regiment turned over all of its Yak-7Bs to the other regiments of the 294th IAD, after which its pilots departed for new Yak-7Bs, which were received at Kuznetsk from the 13th Reserve Fighter Aviation Regiment of the Volga Military District on 21 July.

The 761st transferred to the 259th IAD of the 3rd Air Army of the Kalinin Front (1st Baltic Front from 20 October) on 29 July, and began flying combat missions on 1 August; it would serve with the 259th and the 3rd Air Army for the rest of the war. Its first known aerial victory came three days later, when Lieutenant M.A. Krylov downed a Focke-Wulf Fw 189 reconnaissance aircraft southeast of Usvyaty. The first regimental commander, Major Vladimir Sirotkin, was killed on 10 September, and replaced by Major Konstantin Razorenov, who led the 761st for the rest of the war and was later promoted to lieutenant colonel. After several months of combat, the regiment began receiving newer Yakovlev Yak-9 fighters in November. Between March and April 1944, it reorganized to include three aviation squadrons with an authorized strength of forty aircraft (twelve per squadron with four in headquarters flight). For its actions during the Polotsk Offensive, the regiment received the name of Polotsk as an honorific on 23 July. The 761st was further decorated with the Order of Kutuzov, 3rd class, on 31 October, in recognition of its "exemplary performance of command tasks" in the breakthrough of German defenses northwest and southwest of Šiauliai and "valor and courage."

With its division and army, the regiment was transferred to the Samland Group of Forces of the 3rd Belorussian Front on 24 February 1945. That spring, it received small numbers of improved Yak-9U and Yak-3 fighters. The regiment ended the war with the 3rd Belorussian Front on 9 May, and was awarded the Order of Suvorov, 3rd class, on 28 May for its performance in the capture of Pillau at the end of the Samland Offensive in late April.

During the war, the regiment completed 7,139 combat missions and conducted 110 air battles, claiming 142 German aircraft downed, and five destroyed on the ground, suffering losses of 33 pilots and 50 aircraft.

== Postwar years ==
With the 259th IAD, the regiment remained with the 3rd Air Army as part of the Special Military District in East Prussia until 28 November 1945, when it began relocating to Kirovabad in Azerbaijan. At Kirovabad, the regiment and its division became part of the 7th Air Army of the Baku Military District on 17 December 1945, transferring to the newly created 11th Air Army of the Transcaucasian Military District on 24 April after the Baku Military District merged to form the reformed Transcaucasian Military District. With its division, the regiment transferred to the 5th IAK (renumbered as the 62nd IAK in 1949) of the reformed 7th Air Army on 20 November 1947. By the beginning of 1950, the 761st and 259th had transferred to the 34th Air Army (the renumbered 11th), and in January of that year were again transferred to the 36th IAK of the 42nd Fighter Air Defense Army of the National Air Defense Forces (PVO), part of the Baku Air Defense Region.

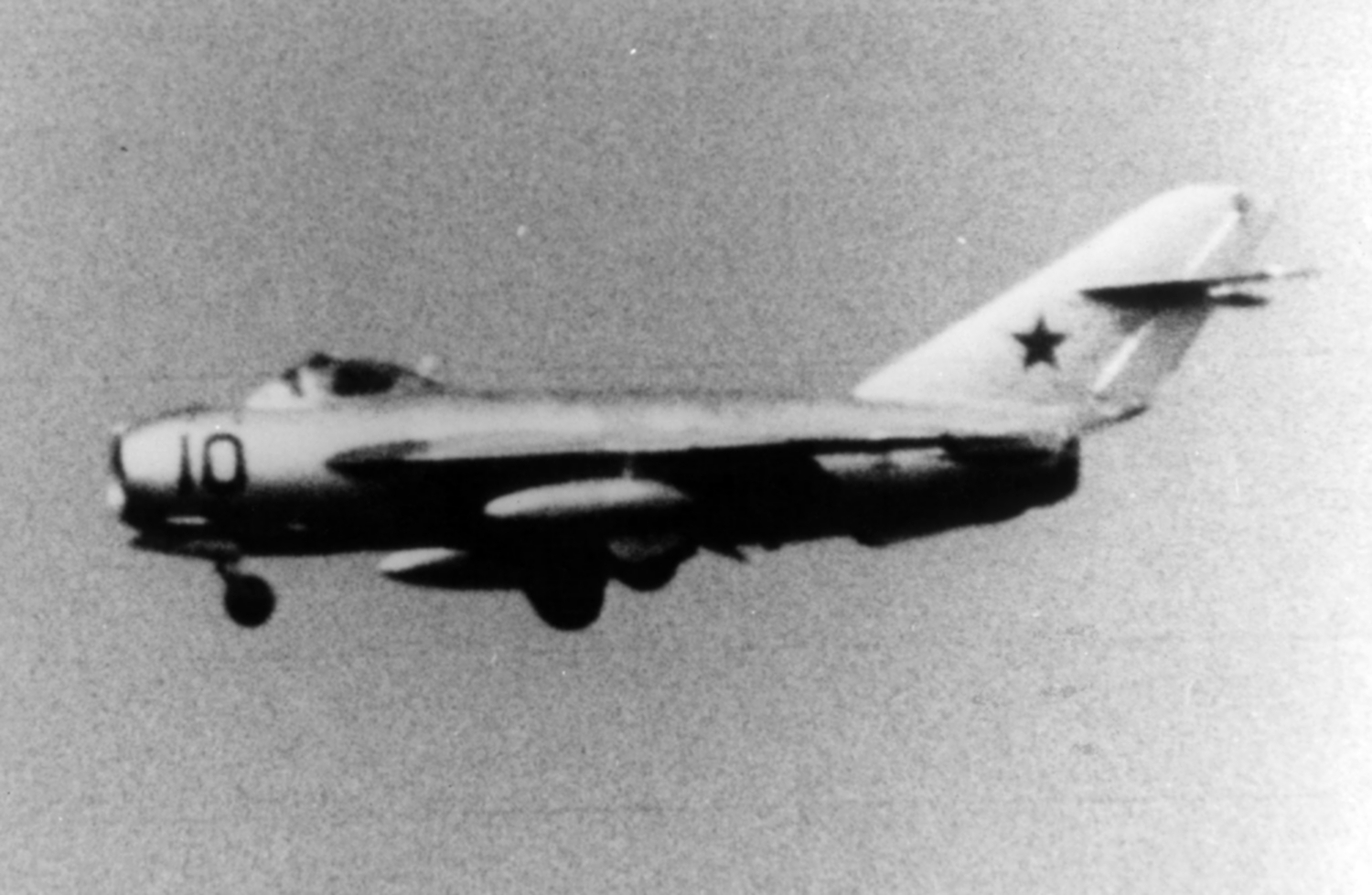
A MiG-17 of the type flown by the regiment

Between December 1951 and April 1952, the regiment received Mikoyan-Gurevich MiG-15 jet fighters, which were replaced with the upgraded Mikoyan-Gurevich MiG-17 between January and March 1953. Together with the 259th, the regiment transferred to Kyurdamir, where it rejoined the 62nd IAK, now also part of the 42nd Fighter Air Defense Army, in September 1953. The latter was subordinated to the Baku Air Defense District from 14 June 1954. During the 1960 PVO reorganization, the 62nd IAK and 42nd Air Defense Army were disbanded and with the 259th the 761st became part of the 15th Air Defense Corps of the Baku District. The regiment relocated to Adzhikabul airfield on 22 November of that year. The 259th IAD was disbanded in 1963, and the 761st was directly subordinated to the headquarters of the 15th Air Defense Corps. Two years later, the regiment was subordinated to the Armavir Higher Military Aviation School of Air Defense Pilots, with which it became the 761st Training Aviation Regiment, although still at Adzhikabul. The regiment relocated to Khanskaya near Maykop on 1 November 1991 when Soviet forces withdrew from Azerbaijan and became part of the Russian Air Force after the Dissolution of the Soviet Union. It was disbanded in late 2009 due to military reforms and since 2015 has been perpetuated by the Training Aviation Base of the 2nd category of the Krasnodar Higher Military Aviation School of Pilots at Maykop.
