= Lebedovo =

- IATA: none; ICAO: none

Summary
- Airport type: Abandoned
- Location: Privolzsky
- Elevation AMSL: 249 ft / 76 m
- Coordinates: 51°17′0″N 046°15′0″E

Map
- Location in Saratov Oblast Lebedovo (Russia)

Runways
Direction	Length		Surface
Direction	ft	m	Surface
	11,483	3,500	Concrete

Lebedovo (also Dolinniye) was an air base in Russia located 18 km southeast of Privolzsky, Saratov Oblast. It appeared on U.S. Department of Defense aeronautical charts dating from the 1960s and 1970s. It was probably a local diversion site for Engels bombers. It is now a dairy farm and the runways have been scrapped.
