= Verkhnaya Zaimka =

- IATA: none; ICAO: ZD3P

Summary
- Airport type: Abandoned
- Location: Nizhneangarsk
- Elevation AMSL: 1,539 ft / 469 m
- Coordinates: 55°49′30″N 110°5′54″E

Map
- Location in Severo-Baykalsky District, Republic of Buryatia Verkhnaya Zaimka (Russia)

Runways
Direction	Length		Surface
Direction	ft	m	Surface
	4,921	1,500

Verkhnaya Zaimka is an air base in Russia located 34 km east of Nizhneangarsk.

It is in a forested area; a perimeter circles the airfield, suggesting it may have had minor military use but not beyond the 1950s, when military facilities were being built to high standards.
