= Kobrin (surname) =

Kobrin, Kobryn, or Cobrin is a surname of Slavic origin. It may refer to:

== Kobrin ==
- Alexander Kobrin (born 1980), Russian pianist
- Helena Kobrin (born 1948), American Scientologist and lawyer
- Leon Kobrin (1873–1946), American playwright in Yiddish theater
- Vjatšeslav Kobrin (1958–2016), Russian guitarist
- Vladimir Kobrin (1930–1990), Soviet historian

== Kobryn ==
- Alen Pol Kobryn (1949–2023), American poet and novelist
- Aneta Kobryń (born 2000), Polish para cross-country skier
- Cris Kobryn (born 1952), American software engineer
- Ewelina Kobryn (born 1982), Polish basketball player
- Ihor Kobryn (1951–2023), Ukrainian film director and animator
- Rafał Kobryń (born 1999), Polish footballer

== Cobrin ==
- G. M. Cobrin, scientist; see Crohn's disease
- Mel Dobrin and Marilyn Steinberg Cobrin; see Steinberg's (supermarket)
