= Artsyz Air Base =

Former air base in Artsyz, Odesa Oblast, Ukraine

Artsyz Chervonoglinskaya Chervonohlinske
- Artsyz, Odesa Oblast in Ukraine

Site information
- Type: Air Base
- Owner: Ministry of Defence
- Operator: Ukrainian Air Force

Location
- Shown within Odesa Oblast Artsyz (Ukraine)
- Coordinates: 45°56′50″N 29°22′31″E

Site history
- Built: 1960
- In use: 1960 - 1992

Airfield information
- Elevation: 10 metres (33 ft) AMSL
Runways
Direction	Length and surface
14/32	2,500 metres (8,202 ft) Concrete

Artsyz is a former Ukrainian Air Force base located near Artsyz, Odesa Oblast, Ukraine.

The base was home to the 37th Guards Military Transport Aviation Regiment of the Soviet Air Forces using the Ilyushin Il-76MD and the 90th Independent Assault Aviation Regiment with the Sukhoi Su-25 between 1983 and 1989.
