= Astrakhan air base =

Airport in Astrakhan Oblast, Russia

Astrakhan (Ashchuluk)
- Astrakhan, Astrakhan Oblast in Russia
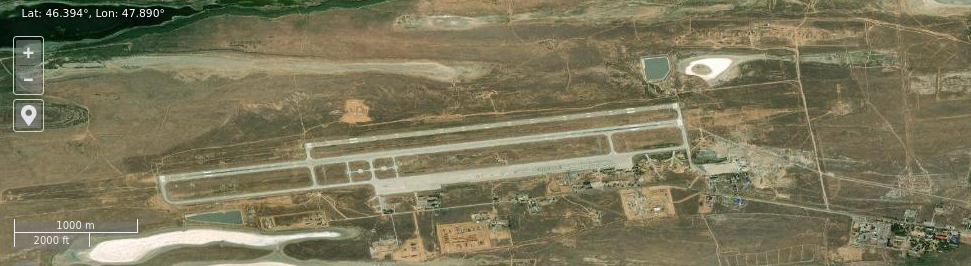
- Satellite imagery of Astrakhan air base

Site information
- Type: Air Base
- Owner: Ministry of Defence
- Operator: Russian Aerospace Forces

Location
- Shown within Astrakhan Oblast Astrakhan (Russia)
- Coordinates: 46°23′38″N 47°53′51″E

Site history
- In use: -present

Airfield information
- Identifiers: ICAO: XRAP
- Elevation: −23 metres (−75 ft) AMSL
Runways
Direction	Length and surface
07L/25R	2,500 metres (8,202 ft) Concrete
07R/25L	3,500 metres (11,483 ft) Concrete

Privolzhskiy is a large Russian Aerospace Forces airfield and air base located near the city of Astrakhan, Astrakhan Oblast, Russia.

== History ==
In August 1956, the Soviet Union Air Force 393rd Guards Fighter Aviation Baranovichi Red Banner Order of Suvorov 3rd degree Regiment was transferred to this airfield. It was part of the 10th Air Defence Division (of the 25th independent Air Defence Corps 1960-63 and then the Baku Air Defence District 1963-73). In 1973 10th Air Defence Division was merged into 12th Air Defence Corps.

In August 1958 the creation of the 228th Mixed Aviation Regiment (Military Unit Number 28025) began in Mozdok in the North Ossetian Autonomous Soviet Socialist Republic, North Caucasus Military District. In April 1960 it moved to Astrakhan, as it was intended for combat training at the Ashuluk Range.

In October 1992 the base was transitioned to the Russian Air Force following the dissolution of the Soviet Union. The 529th Fighter Aviation Regiment was absorbed into the regiment and it was retitled the 209th Guards Fighter Aviation Regiment now part of the 51st Air Defence Corps.

In 2022, the base was home to the 116th Centre for Combat Employment of Air Defence Aviation which uses the Mikoyan MiG-29 under the 185th Centre for Combat Application and Combat Training for the Air Force.

== See also ==
- List of military airbases in Russia
