= Zimnyanskiy Aerodrome =

Small aerodrome near Volgograd, Volgograd Oblast, Russia

Zimnyanskiy Aerodrome Beketovsk
- Volgograd, Volgograd Oblast in Russia

Site information
- Type: Air Base

Location
- Shown within Volgograd Oblast Beketovsk (Russia)
- Coordinates: 48°33′03″N 44°22′40″E

Site history
- In use: -present

Airfield information
- Identifiers: ICAO: URWA
Runways
Direction	Length and surface
	2,720 metres (8,924 ft) Natural

Zimyanskiy Aerodrome (formerly Beketovsk, Beketowskaja, Deketovskaya, or Beketovka) is a small aerodrome located approximately 20 kilometres (12 mi) southwest Volgograd, Volgograd Oblast, Russia.

== History ==
From 1951 through 1997, the aerodrome was used by the Russian Air Force (and predecessor Soviet Air Forces) as a training base and was home to the 706th Training Aviation Regiment. This unit was stood up on 14 June 1951 with MiG-15 aircraft during the 1950s before converting to the Czechoslovak-built L-29 Delfin dedicated trainers in 1963. More advanced L-39 Albatros aircraft were acquired in the 1980s and the unit was reported as operating 89 of them in 1990 along with 84 of the original L-29 fleet. The L-29s were withdrawn in 1992, but the L-39s continued in service until the regiment was disbanded in 1997.

The airfield's existence pre-dated World War II, and while German forces briefly occupied the airfield during the German Case Blue offensive, there is no record of it being used by the Luftwaffe.
