= Danilovo (air base) =

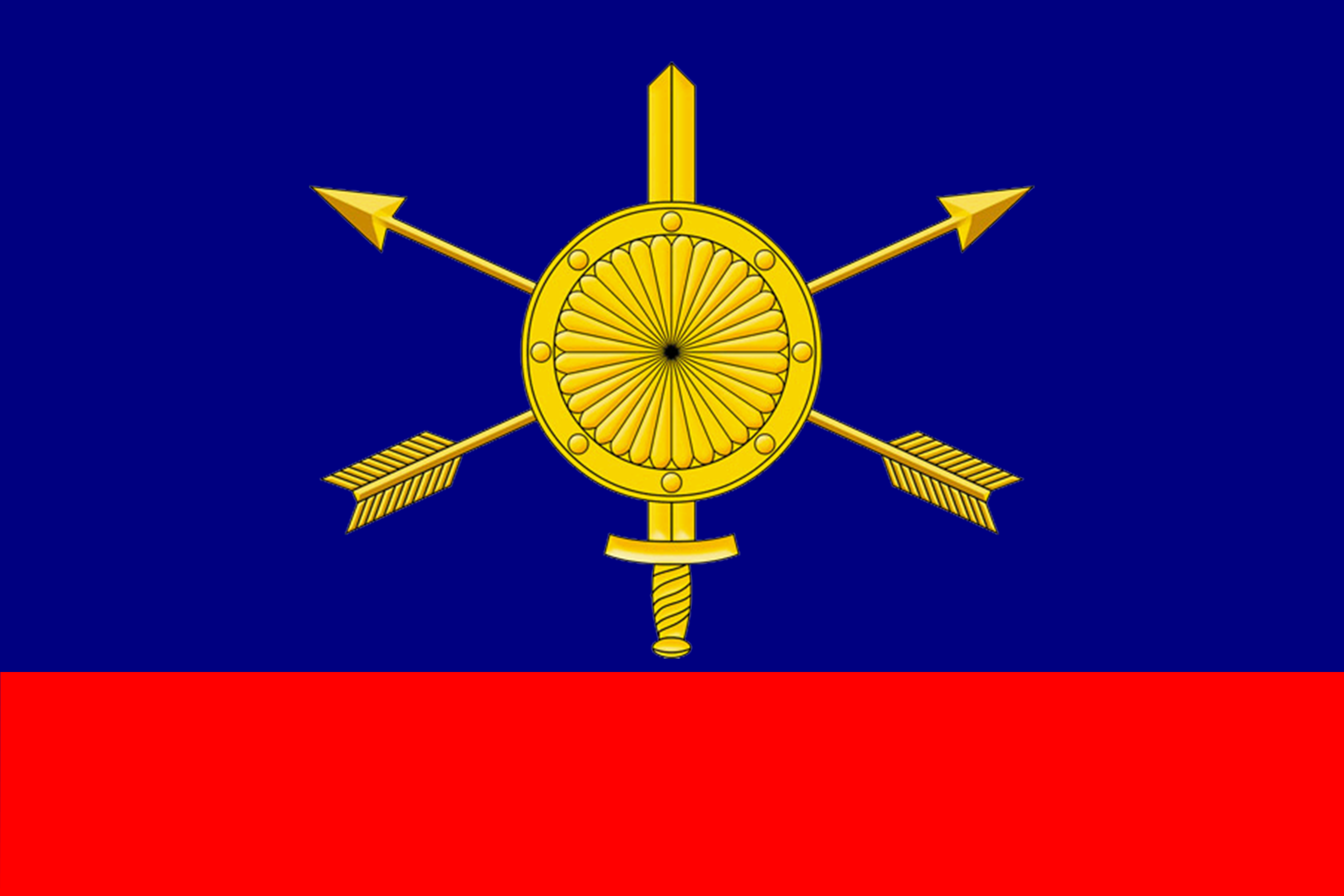
Danilovo
- Yoshkar-Ola, Mari El in Russia

Site information
- Type: Air Base
- Owner: Ministry of Defence
- Operator: Strategic Rocket Forces

Location
- Shown within Mari El Danilovo (Russia)
- Coordinates: 56°39′36″N 048°2′0″E

Site history
- Built: 1952
- In use: 1952 - present

Airfield information
- Identifiers: ICAO: XWKD
- Elevation: 117 metres (384 ft) AMSL
Runways
Direction	Length and surface
16/32	2,350 metres (7,710 ft) Concrete

Danilovo is an air base in Mari El Republic, Russia located 11 km east of Yoshkar-Ola. It was a small interceptor aircraft airfield, now used by a Helicopter Squadron of the Missile forces.

The base is currently home to the 108th independent Helicopter Squadron of the 14th Kievsko-Zhitomirskaya order of Kutuzov Missile Division of the 27th Guards Vitebskaya Red Banner Missile Army.

The base was home to the 681st Fighter Aviation Regiment PVO between 1952 and 1994.
