= Khanskaya (air base) =

Air base in Russia

Khanskaya Maykop
- Maykop, Adygea in Russia
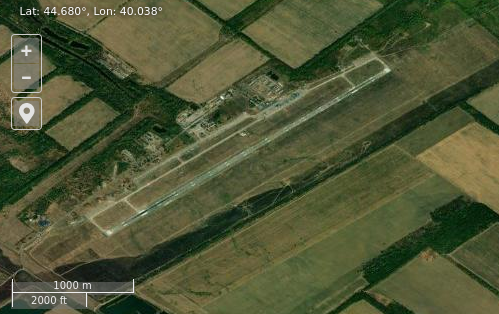
- Satellite imagery of Khanskaya air base

Site information
- Type: Air Base
- Owner: Ministry of Defence
- Operator: Russian Aerospace Forces

Location
- Shown within Adygea Khanskaya (Russia)
- Coordinates: 44°40′48″N 40°02′18″E

Site history
- In use: present

Airfield information
- Identifiers: ICAO: URKH
- Elevation: 183 metres (600 ft) AMSL
Runways
Direction	Length and surface
04/22	2,500 metres (8,202 ft) Concrete

Khanskaya (ICAO: URKH) is a Russian Aerospace Forces air base located on the north-west of Maykop, Russia in the Adygea Republic. The airport was used also for civil aviation up to 2009.

The base is home to the 761st Training Aviation Regiment which flies the Aero L-39C Albatros under the 783rd Aviation Training Centre for the Training of Flight Personnel.

The regiment moved here during 1991.

In 2010, the authorities of Adygea proposed the reconstruction of the airfield using funds from the Russian federal budget.

As of October 2024 Khanskaya air base was reportedly home to the 272nd Training Aviation Regiment.

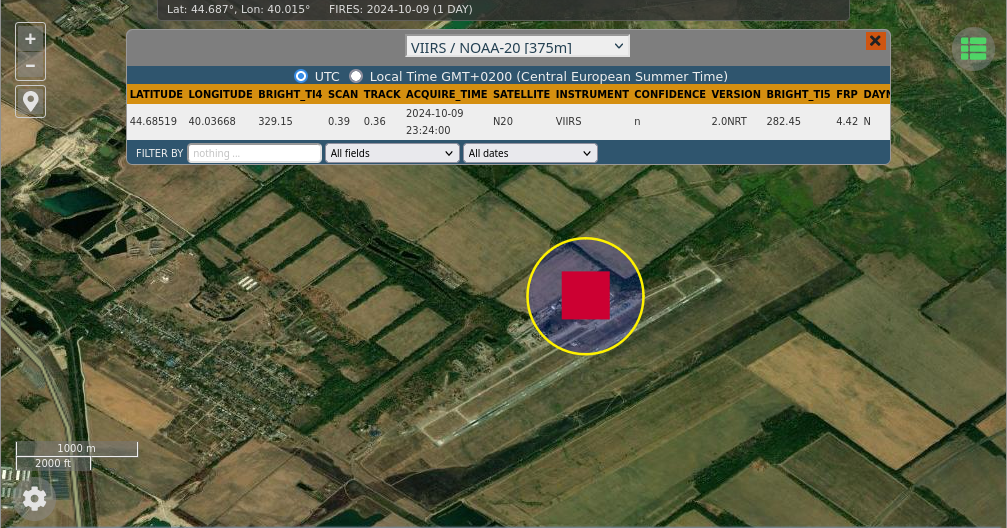
NASA's FIRMS detected fire at Khanskaya air base on 9 October 2024 23:24:00 (UTC)

On 10 October 2024, a Ukrainian drone attack targeted the Khanskaya airbase causing a fire detected by NASA's FIRMS.

== See also ==
- List of military airbases in Russia
