= Kobrin (air base) =

Former Belarusian Air Force base

Kobryn
- Kobryn, Brest Region in Belarus

Site information
- Type: Air Base
- Owner: Ministry of Defence
- Operator: Belarusian Air Force

Location
- Shown within Belarus
- Coordinates: 52°14′18″N 24°20′48″E

Site history
- Built: 1945
- In use: 1945 - 1992

Airfield information
- Elevation: 10 metres (33 ft) AMSL
Runways
Direction	Length and surface
13/31	2,000 metres (6,562 ft) Concrete

Kobryn is a former airbase of the Belarusian Air Force located near Kobryn, Brest Region, Belarus.

The base was home to the:

- 225th Independent Helicopter Regiment during 1972 with the Mil Mi-4 (ASCC: Hound)
- 397th Independent Assault Aviation Regiment between 1986 and 1992 with the Sukhoi Su-25 (ASCC: Frogfoot) and the Aero L-39 Albatros
- 302nd Independent Helicopter Squadron for Electronic Warfare between 1989 and 1992 with the Mil Mi-8SMV (ASCC: Hip-J) and a few Mil Mi-10PP (ASCC: Hare), Mil Mi-22 (ASCC: Hook-D), Mil Mi-6 (ASCC: Hook) and Mil Mi-24 (ASCC: Hind)
- 18th Guards Fighter Aviation Regiment between 1945 and 1948 with the Yakovlev Yak-3
- 171st Fighter Aviation Regiment between 1948 and 1950 with the Lavochkin La-7
- 50th Fighter Aviation Regiment between 1948 and 1950 with the La-7
- 979th Fighter Aviation Regiment between 1952 and 1960 with the Mikoyan-Gurevich MiG-17 (ASCC: Fresco) and the Mikoyan-Gurevich MiG-19S (ASCC: Farmer-C)
- 523rd Fighter Aviation Regiment between 1945 and 1948 with the La-7
- 415th Fighter Aviation Regiment during 1950 with the La-7
- 133rd Fighter Aviation Regiment between 1952 and 1961 with the Mikoyan-Gurevich MiG-15 (ASCC: Fagot) and the MiG-17
- 9th Guards Fighter Aviation Regiment between 1945 and 1946 with the La-7
- 139th Guards Fighter Aviation Regiment between 1945 and 1948 with the Yakovlev Yak-9
