= Gorelovo (air base) =

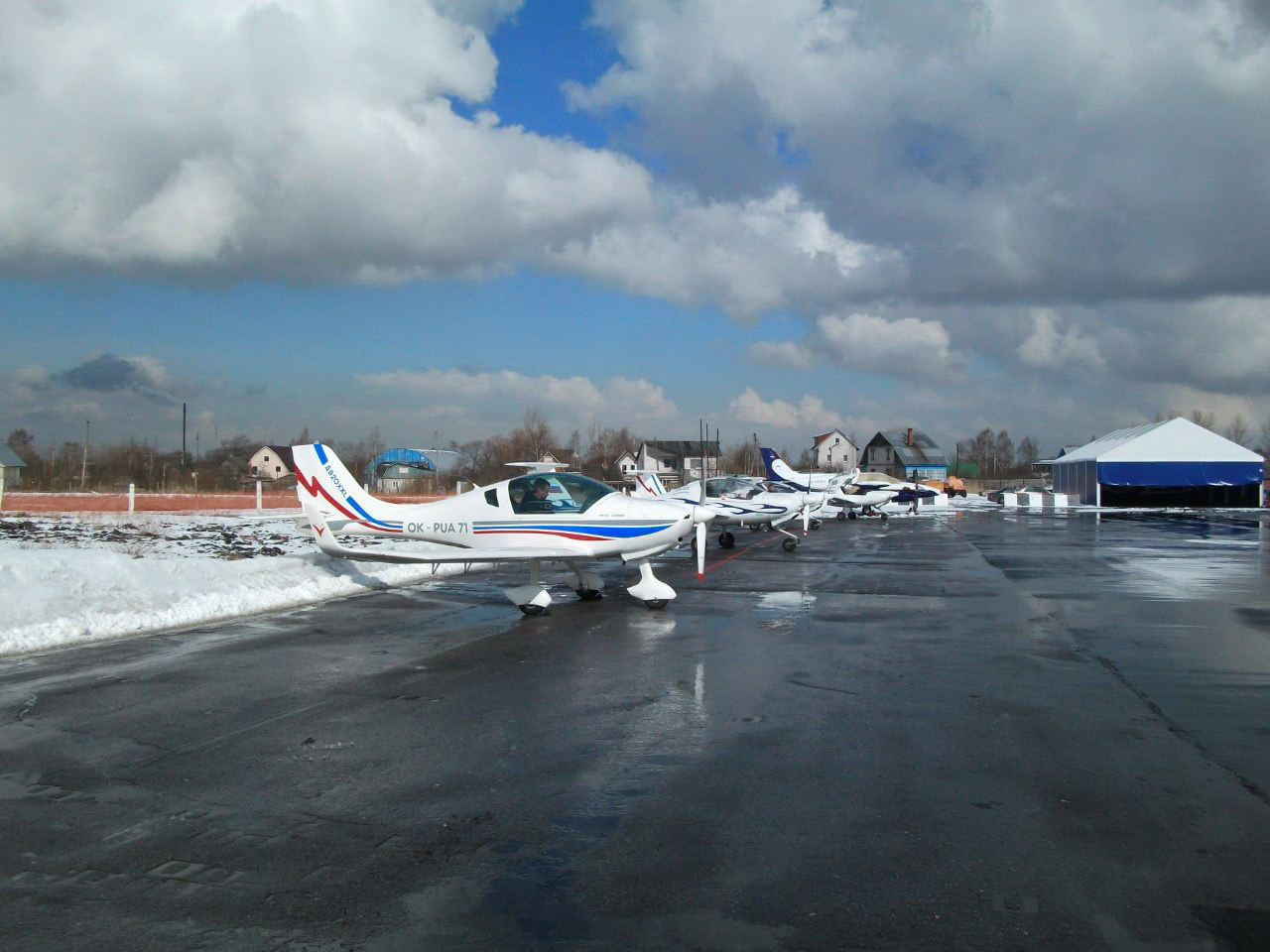
- General aviation apron at Gorelovo airfield
- IATA: none; ICAO: none

Summary
- Airport type: Joint Civilian/Military
- Operator: unknown
- Serves: Saint-Petersburg
- Location: Anninskoe highway 1k2, Saint Petersburg, Russia
- Elevation AMSL: 190 ft (58 m)
- Coordinates: 59°46′5.6″N 030°3′46.6″E
- Website: http://maps.aopa.ru/id/XLLE

Map
- Location of the airport in Saint Petersburg Show map of Russia Location of the airport in Europe

Runways
Direction	Length		Surface
Direction	ft	m	Surface
07/25	8,200	2,500	Concrete

Gorelovo (Russian: Горелово) is a former military aerodrome. It is located 23 kilometers (14 mi) southwest of Saint Petersburg city center, and 10 kilometers (6.2 mi) west of Pulkovo Airport. Right now it is a developing place for general aviation and a take-off site for the "419th helicopter repair plant", which is located at the eastern part of the runway. Internal Russian index code for this airfield is XLLE.

== History ==
Gorelovo was originally built in 1938 to house parts of the Soviet Air Force's 19th Fighter Aviation Regiment. The air base was named after the adjacent village of Gorelovo, now in Saint Petersburg's Krasnoselsky District. During the Winter War from November 1939 to March 1940, the regiment flew 3,412 sorties while operating from Gorelovo in the north-western borders of the Soviet Union, earning the award the Order of the Red Banner. In March 1951, Gorelovo became home to the 29th Guards Fighter Aviation Volkhov Regiment returning from the Korean War, and was established as part of the air defense system for Leningrad (Saint Petersburg). In 1952, the 11th Guards Fighter Aviation Regiment was also based at Gorelovo until June 21, 1965, when the regiment was disbanded.

In May 1969, the 29th Guards Fighter Aviation Volkhov Regiment was disbanded, and the airfield was transferred to the 419th Aircraft Repair Plant, and part of the regiment's premises was occupied by the Leningrad Higher Military-Political School of the Soviet Air Defence Forces. Until the dissolution of the Soviet Union in 1991, Gorelovo was primarily used by military transport planes such as the Antonov An-8 and An-12 heading to airfields in the Baltic Military District. Gorelovo was renamed Annino after another adjacent village in Leningrad Oblast and briefly used by the Russian Air Force before falling out of military use. Today, the airfield is used by aircraft enthusiasts for mostly light aircraft, and houses one of only three airworthy Ilyushin Il-14s.
