= Baku Air Defence Army =

Baku Air Defence Army Бакинская армия ПВО
- Active: 1942–1945
- Country: Soviet Union
- Type: Army
- Role: Anti-aircraft warfare
- Part of: Transcaucasian Air Defence Zone; Transcaucasian Air Defence Front (from April 1944)

Commanders
- Notable commanders: Major General Pyotr Beskrovnov; Lieutenant General Nikolai Markov

The Baku Air Defence Army (Russian: Бакинская армия ПВО) was a formation of the Soviet Air Defence Forces that existed in the Azerbaijan SSR from 1942 to 1945.

== History ==
Soviet air defence in the Transcaucasus was provided by various bodies from 1918:

- Air defence of detachments of the Baku Commune (1918);
- Air Defence of the 11th Red Army of the Red Army (1920);
- 3rd Air Defence Corps (1935-1942);

The Baku Air Defence Army was formed on the Eastern Front of World War II following the decree of the State Defence Committee of April 5, 1942. Previously known as the Baku Air Defence Corps, its main objective became sheltering the Baku oil fields from German raids. The Wehrmacht had been planning the capture of the oil field under the codename Operation Edelweiss. During the intense German air reconnaissance in May–October, 1942 the Army included the 8th Air Defence Fighter Corps, seven anti-aircraft regiments, one anti-aircraft machine-gun regiment, a searchlight regiment, a barrage balloon regiment and other units. During its actions, the Army downed eight aircraft.

At the beginning of 1946, the Baku Air Defence Army was reorganized into the 17th Air Defence Corps as part of the Southwestern Air Defence District. In accordance with the directive of the Minister of the Armed Forces of the USSR of June 24, 1947, the Baku Air Defence Army was recreated on the basis of the 17th Air Defence Corps, and in the fall of 1948, the Baku Air Defence Region [Бакинский район ПВО] (of the 1st category) was recreated on the basis of its administration. This region included the 49th Fighter Aviation Corps PVO, which was later disbanded.

From 1954 it was redesignated the Baku Air Defence District of the Soviet Air Defence Forces (PVO), until it was abolished on 5 January 1980. It was intended to cover the Baku and Absheron Peninsula oil districts from air attack. The 72nd Guards Fighter Aviation Corps, previously with the 42nd Fighter Air Defence Army, became the district's 16th Guards Air Defence Division in January 1960 during the reorganization of the PVO. From that point it included both fighters, surface-to-air missiles, and air defence radars. In 1973, 10th Air Defence Division was absorbed by 12th Air Defence Corps.

After the abolition of the Baku District, the main PVO formation in the Trancaucasus became the 19th Army of PVO headquartered in Tbilisi. 19th PVO Army consisted a number of different units and formations. There were two Corps of Air Defence Forces (14th, later renamed 96th Air Defence Division, and 12th Air Defence Corps, activated March 1960) two divisions of air defence forces (97th and 10th). Smaller units included three SAM brigades, a separate SA-2 regiment near Gudauta, Abkhazia, a separate SA-5 regiment near Tbilisi, at least two radar units, and a number of fighter aviation regiments (see List of Soviet Air Force bases).

== 1988 partial order of battle ==
In 1988, 12th Air Defence Corps consisted of:

- Headquarters, Rostov-on-Don
- 83rd Guards Fighter Aviation Regiment PVO (Rostov-on-Don, Rostov Oblast) 40 MiG-25 (потом МиГ-31)
- 562nd Fighter Aviation Regiment PVO (Krymsk, Krasnodar Kray), 35 Su-27
- 393rd Guards Fighter Aviation Regiment PVO (Privolzhskiy, Astrakhan Oblast), 38 MiG-23 - renamed 209th Guards Fighter Aviation Regiment, with Su-27, MiG-23 in October 1992.
- 54th Anti-Aircraft Rocket Brigade (Volgograd, Volgograd Oblast)
- 80th Anti-Aircraft Rocket Brigade (Novorossiysk, Krasnodar Kray) (later reduced to a regiment)
- 93rd Anti-Aircraft Rocket Brigade (Rostov-na-Don, Rostov Oblast)
- 631st Anti-Aircraft Rocket Regiment (Novolesnyy [Astrakhan], Astrakhan Oblast)
- 815th Anti-Aircraft Rocket Regiment (Groznyy, Checheno-Imgushskaya ASSR)
- 879th Anti-Aircraft Rocket Regiment (Tuapse, Krasnodar Kray)
- 1244th Anti-Aircraft Rocket Regiment (Volgodonsk, Rostov Oblast)
- an Anti-Aircraft Rocket Regiment at Nalchik
- 7th Radio-Technical Brigade (Rostov-on-Don, Rostov Oblast)
- 64th Radio-Technical Regiment (Astrakhan, Astrakhan Oblast)
- 77th Radio-Technical Regiment (Ordzhonikidze, Krasnodar Kray)

In December 1988, 96th Air Defence Division consisted of:

- 166th Guards Fighter Aviation Regiment PVO (Marneuli (Sandar), near Tbilisi, Georgian SSR) 40 Su-15ТМ (12 кПВО)
- 529th Fighter Aviation Regiment PVO (Gudauta, Abkhazskaya ASSR), 34 Su-27 - had arrived from Ugolnye Kopi, Chukot Autonomous Okrug, in October 1982.
- 144th Anti-Aircraft Rocket Brigade (Tbilisi, Georgian SSR)
- 266th Anti-Aircraft Rocket Brigade (Poti, Georgian SSR)
- 643rd Anti-Aircraft Rocket Brigade (Gudauta, Abkhazskaya ASSR)
- 383rd Anti-Aircraft Rocket Regiment (Echmiadzin, Armenian SSR)
- 78th Radio-Technical Brigade (Batumi, Georgian SSR)
- 79th Radio-Technical Brigade (Marneuli, Georgian SSR)

In December 1988, 97th Air Defence Division consisted of:

- Headquarters, Alyaty, Baku
- 82nd Fighter Aviation Regiment PVO (иап), Nasosnaya (air base), Baku, 38 MiG-25
- 128th Anti-Aircraft Missile Brigade (Eirya, Azerbaizhan SSR)
- 129th Anti-Aircraft Missile Brigade (Sangachaly, Azerbaizhan SSR)
- 190th Anti-Aircraft Missile Regiment (Mingechaur, Azerbaizhan SSR)
- 2nd Radio-Technical Brigade (Alyaty (Baku), Azerbaizhan SSR)

In 1992 the 10th Air Defence Division and the 14th Air Defence Corps were disbanded.

19th PVO Army was disbanded 1 April 1993, with some equipment handed over to Georgian Ministry of Defence, but most equipment being withdrawn to be disposed of in Russia. Some of the fighter regiments were withdrawn to Russia and disbanded, and many remaining units, including the 12th Air Defence Corps, became part of the 4th Air Army. Georgia was able to seize at least one battalion of S-75 SAMs, two batteries of P-125Ms, as well as several P-18 (Spoon Rest) radars.

Later in the 1990s after the fall of the Soviet Union, 12th Air Defence Corps became 51st Air Defence Corps in July 1998.

== Commanders ==
Commanders of the Baku Air Defence District and it successor units included:

- Colonel-General Konstantin Vershinin (1956–1959)
- Colonel-General Vladimir Ivanov (1959–1966)
- Colonel-General Athanasius Shcheglov (1966–1973)
- Colonel-General Fedor Olifirov (1973–1980)
- Colonel-General Anatoly Konstantinov

== Notes ==
- Валерий Симонов (2016-05-11). ""A Betrayed Army"" [«Преданная и проданная армия»]. www.sovsekretno.ru. Archived from the original on 2019-05-11.
