= List of countries with overseas military bases =

This is a list of countries with overseas military bases.

== Background ==
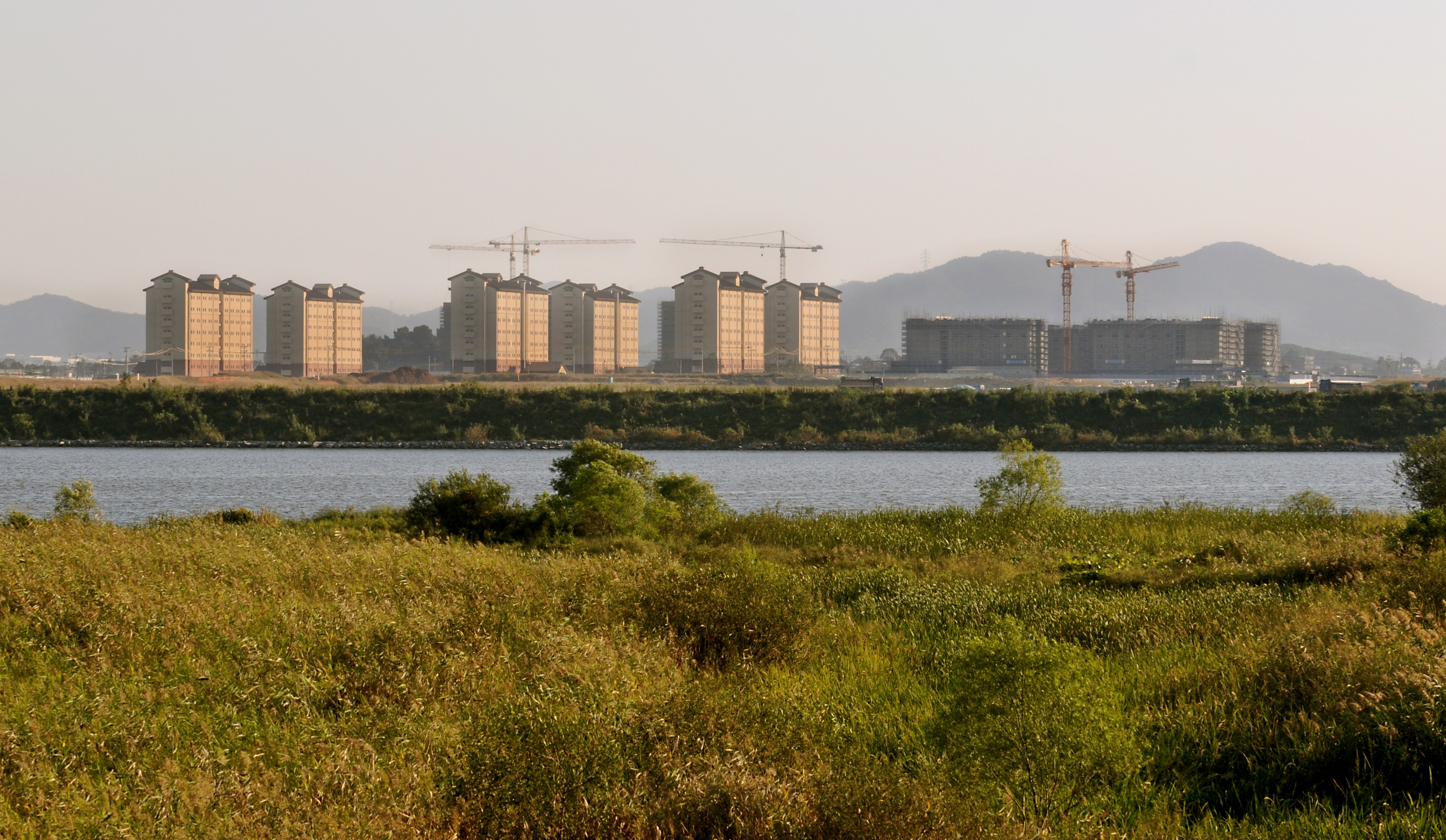
Camp Humphreys in South Korea, the largest United States overseas military base by population, with a combined military and civilian population of 40,000.

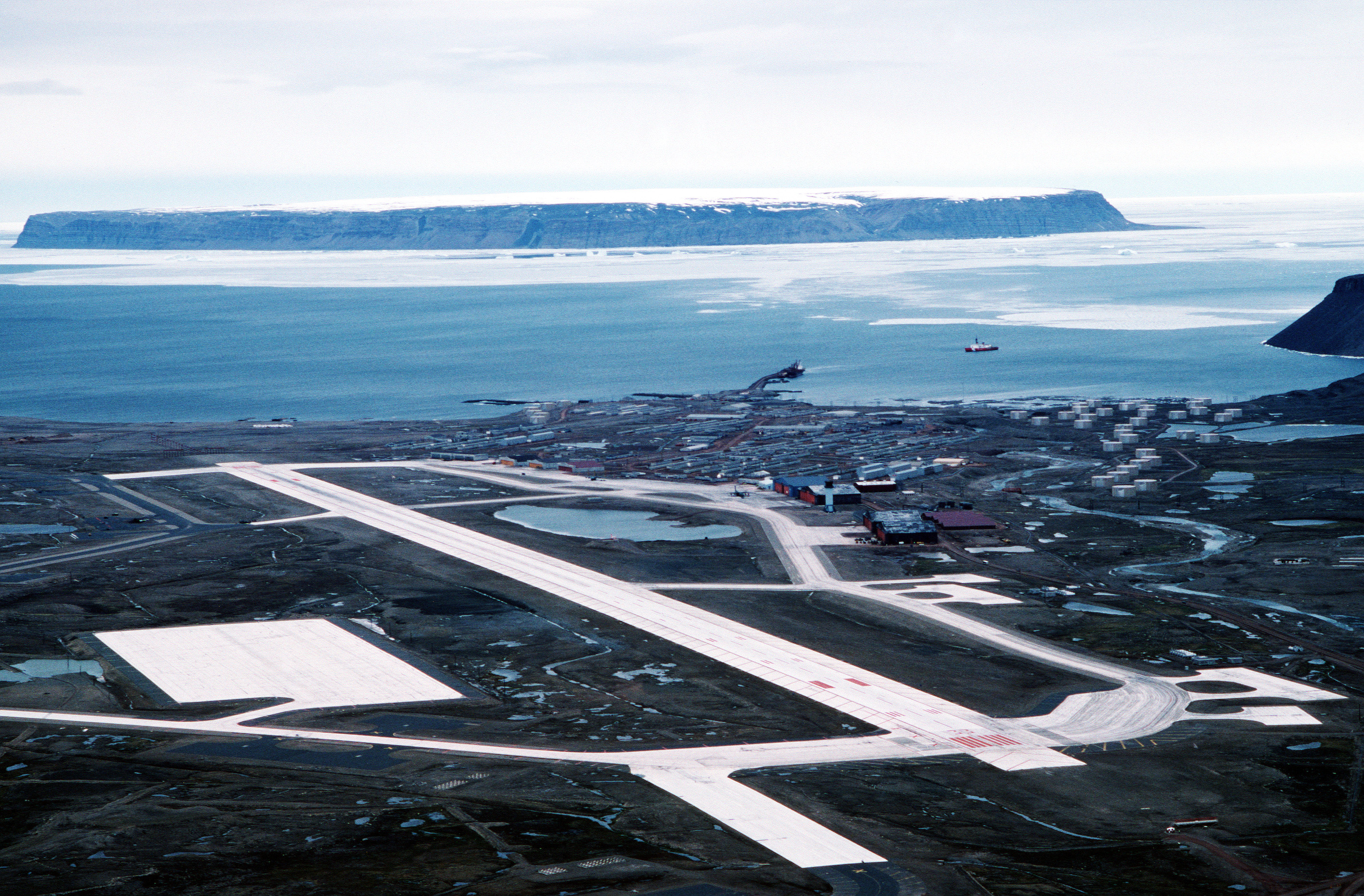
Pituffik Space Base in Greenland, the largest United States overseas military base by area, at 66,000 hectares.

The establishment of military bases abroad enables a country to project power, e.g., to conduct expeditionary warfare, to influence events abroad. Depending on their size and infrastructure, they can be staging areas or for logistical, communications, and intelligence support. Many conflicts throughout modern history have resulted in overseas military bases being established in large numbers by world powers. These bases have helped them to achieve political and military goals.

At one time, the establishment of coaling stations for naval ships was important. The United Kingdom and other colonial powers established overseas military bases in many of their colonies during the First and Second World Wars. During the Cold War, the United States and the Soviet Union established military bases within their respective spheres of influence.

The war on terror has resulted in overseas military bases being established in the Middle East. While the overall number of overseas military bases has fallen since 1945, the United States, Turkey, the United Kingdom, Russia, India, and France still possess or utilize a substantial number of them. Smaller numbers of overseas military bases are operated by China, Iran, Italy, Japan, Saudi Arabia, Singapore and the United Arab Emirates.

The United States is the largest operator of military bases abroad, with 38 "named bases" (Note: What are here termed "named bases" are the bases listed in section X: "Personnel Data from DMDC", i.e. excluding that table's rows labelled "Other", in the 2015 DoD Base Structure Report.) with active duty, national guard, reserve, or civilian personnel as of September 2014. Its largest, in terms of personnel, was Ramstein AB in Germany, with almost 9,200 personnel. (Note: The 2015 U.S. Base Structure Report gives 587 overseas sites, but sites are merely real property at a distinct geographical location, and multiple sites may belong to one installation (page DoD-3). For example, the Garmisch, Germany "named base" with its 72 personnel has eight distinct sites large enough to be listed in the Army's Individual Service Inventory list: Artillery Kaserne, Breitenau Skeet Range, Garmisch Family Housing, Garmish Golf Course, General Abrams Hotel And Disp, Hausberg Ski Area, Oberammergau NATO School, and Sheridan Barracks (listed in Army-15 to Army-17). These range in size from Ramstein AB with 9,188 active, guard/reserve, and civilian personnel down to Worms, which has just one civilian.)

== Argentina ==
Country	Location	Details
Haiti	Gonaïves	They provided assistance in delivering drinking water, medical aid, infrastructure improvements, and maintaining security and order. Argentina had been providing this assistance since 2004; the contingents rotated every six months and were composed of members of the Argentine Army and Navy.

== Australia ==
Country	Location	Details
Malaysia	Butterworth Air Base	Used by Australia's Commitment to the Five Power Defence Arrangements (FPDA). The Australian Army maintains an infantry designated company (Rifle Company Butterworth) at Butterworth, Malaysia for training purposes.
United Arab Emirates	Al Minhad Air Base	Supports Australian operations in the Middle East.
Philippines	TBD	In 2025, Australia was granted access to a number of Filipino bases under an upcoming cooperation agreement.
Papua New Guinea	Lombrum Naval Base and others to be decided under the Pukpuk treaty.	Under expansion. The Pukpuk treaty signed in 2025 will give Australia 'unimpeded access' to several PNG bases.

== Bangladesh ==
Country	Details
Kuwait	A Bangladeshi military contingent (BMC) has resided in Kuwait since the end of the 1991 Gulf War to assist the Kuwait Armed Forces in logistics and other sectors under a bilateral agreement.

== China ==
Country	Location	Details
Cambodia	Preah Sihanouk province	China-funded expansions at the Ream Naval Base characterized as a base for the People's Liberation Army Navy. Cambodia's government emphasizes that the naval base is under joint control.
Djibouti	Djibouti City	People's Liberation Army Support Base, China's inaugural overseas military base.
Tajikistan	Gorno-Badakhshan	Unofficial joint base intended to support operations in response to the security situation in Afghanistan, see People's Armed Police § International operations.
Laos	Vientiane province	Jointly maintained and operated training center and aviation academy facilities at the Ban Keun Airport.

== France ==
Country	Location	Details
Germany		French Forces and Civilian Elements stationed in Germany (FFECSA)
Djibouti	Djibouti	French forces in Djibouti.
Gabon		French elements in Gabon (EFG).
United Arab Emirates		Naval base in Abu Dhabi.

== Germany ==
Country	Location	Details
France	Illkirch-Graffenstaden	Light Infantry Battalion 291, part of the Franco-German Brigade
Lithuania	Rūdninkai Training Area	Lithuanian military facility which, from 2025 onwards, will host 45th Panzer Brigade (Bundeswehr)

== Greece ==
Country	Location	Details
Cyprus	Nicosia	Hellenic Force in Cyprus.

== India ==
Country	Location	Details
Bhutan	Haa and Thimphu	The Indian Military Training Team (IMTRAT) is permanently stationed in western Bhutan. The Indian Army also maintains a detachment in the capital city of Thimphu.
Madagascar	Madagascar	A listening post and a radar facility in northern Madagascar.
Oman	Ras al Hadd and Muscat	A listening post and berthing rights for the Indian Navy.
Mauritius	Agaléga	In 2022, India was funding the construction of a 3,000 m long airfield with associated facilities to house troops. India and Mauritius have agreed on setting up a satellite tracking station in Chagos Islands near a US-UK strategic base, Diego Garcia.
Seychelles	Mahe, Alphonse, Farquhar, Astove and Assumption Island	In 2022, the Indian government supported the construction of six coastal surveillance radars, which are linked to the Indian surveillance system.

== Israel ==
Country	Location	Details
Syria	Machne Yarden, Camp Filon and Camp Yitzhak	Israeli-occupied territories in the Golan Heights.
Syria	Ten bases in Quneitra and Daraa governorates	Israeli invasion of Syria (2024–present).

== Italy ==
Country	Location	Details
Djibouti	Djibouti City	National Military Support Base.
Niger	Diori Hamani International Airport	Bilateral Support Mission in Niger

== Japan ==
Country	Location	Details
Djibouti	Ambouli	Japan Self-Defense Force Base Djibouti.

== Pakistan ==
Country	Location	Details
Saudi Arabia	Tabuk	180 personnel and other bases in permanent training and advisory roles, under a 1982 agreement.

== Russia ==
Country	Details	No. of personnel
Armenia	Russian 102nd Military Base in Gyumri and the Russian 3624th Airbase in Erebuni Airport near Yerevan.	Est. 3,214 to 5,000
Belarus	Russian military presence in Belarus: The Baranavichy Radar Station, the Vileyka naval communication centre near Vileyka and a joint Air Force and Air Defense training center in Baranovichi	Est. 1,500
Kazakhstan	The Baikonur Cosmodrome is rented to Russia but is now under civilian administration. The Sary Shagan anti-ballistic missile testing range and the Kambala air base are also operated by Russia.	
Kyrgyzstan	The 999th Air Base (military unit 20022), the 954th test base of anti-submarine weapons (military unit 87366), the 338th naval communication centre (military unit 45682) and the 17th radio-seismic laboratory of the seismic service of the Ministry of Defence of the Russian Federation.	
Tajikistan	Russian 201st Military Base, Okno space surveillance station.	Est. 7,500
Syria	Tartus naval base, Khmeimim Air Base.	Est. 7,000
Libya	Russian forces operate from LNA-controlled facilities, including port of Tobruk, Al-Khadim and Al Jufra Airbase.	Est. 1,800+
Central African Republic	Joint Russo-CAR training base in Berengo.	Est. 2,100
Niger	Russian forces were moved into base 101 used by U.S. forces until 2024 after the military took control of Niger during the 2023 coup d'état.	Est. 300
Burkina Faso	Russian Africa Corps instructors were deployed in 2024 at the Loumbila training base near Ouagadougou.	Est. 100 to 300
Mali	Russian Africa Corps personnel are deployed at Malian military sites, including Bamako and central Mali bases.	Est. 1,500 to 2,000
Equatorial Guinea	Russian instructors were deployed to Equatorial Guinea to train elite guards for the presidency.	Est. 200
Ukraine Russia (disputed)	Sevastopol Naval Base of the Black Sea Fleet, in Crimea, rented by Russia prior to the annexation of Crimea by the Russian Federation in 2014. In July 2015, Russian prime minister Dmitry Medvedev said that Crimea had been fully integrated into Russia so the base in Sevastopol is no longer classed by Russia as overseas. However, this is contested; United Nations General Assembly Resolution 68/262 rejected Russia's annexation of Crimea, which Russia defended by saying it was supporting the outcome of the 2014 Crimean status referendum, in which a majority voted to rejoin Russia. As of 2016, there were at least 18 Russian military facilities in Crimea, including five air bases: Belbek Air Base, Saky, Gvardeyskoye, Kirovske, Dzhankoi.	Est. 26,000+
Japan Russia (disputed)	Russian military facilities and personnel as the 18th Machine Gun Artillery Division are stationed on the southern Kuril Islands (Iturup, Kunashir, Shikotan and the Habomai islets), which are administered by Russia but claimed by Japan as the “Northern Territories”, making their status internationally disputed.	Est. 3,500
Georgia South Ossetia (disputed)	Following the Russo-Georgian War in 2008, Russia has maintained a large presence in the partially recognised states of Abkhazia and South Ossetia. The Russian 4th Military Base is located in South Ossetia and hosts approximately 3,500 personnel.	Est. 3,500
Georgia Abkhazia (disputed)	Following the Russo-Georgian War in 2008, Russia has maintained a large presence in the partially recognised states of Abkhazia and South Ossetia. The Russian 7th Military Base is located in Abkhazia and hosts approximately 4,500 personnel. In 2024 an agreement was signed for the creation of a Russian naval base with the separatist Republic of Abkhazia at Ochamchire.	Est. 4,500
Moldova Transnistria (disputed)	Russia maintains an operational group of forces in the Transnistria separatist region of Moldova to guard an ammunition depot at Cobasna.	Est. 1,500

== Singapore ==
Country/Territory	Location	Details
Brunei	Jalan Aman Camp	
Thailand	Sai Yok Camp	

== Turkey ==
Countries with Turkish military bases

Country	Location	Details
Albania	Pasha Liman Base	24 troops and 2 frigates. An Albanian-Turkish military cooperation agreement was signed in 1992 that encompassed rebuilding Albania's Pasha Liman Base by Turkey alongside granted access for Turkish use.
Bosnia and Herzegovina	Fatih Sultan Mehmet Barracks	Under EUROFOR Operation Althea 242 troops, previously under Implementation Force and Stabilisation Force in Bosnia and Herzegovina stationed at Mehmet The Conqueror Barracks.
Chad	Abeche and Faya-Largeau base.	The Turkish Armed Forces will receive two military bases in Chad, near the borders with Libya and Sudan.
Cyprus	Northern Cyprus	A total of 35,000 to 40,000 armed forces of Turkey are currently on active duty Cyprus Turkish Peace Force Command in the de facto state Turkish Republic of Northern Cyprus.
Iraq	Disputed territories of northern Iraq: Bashiqa and Bamarni Air Base	Turkey has signed agreement with Iraq which includes allowing the Turkish army to pursue elements of the Kurdistan Workers' Party (PKK) in northern Iraq, with the permission of, and in coordination with the Federal Government of Iraq. It also includes opening two liaison offices between Baghdad and Ankara to exchange intelligence and security information between the two countries. As of 2020, Turkey has a military base with 2,000 personnel garrisoned with around 60 tanks, Armoured personnel carriers and one commando battalion. Turkey has more than 40+ military and intelligence bases scattered all around Iraq, the most out of any country. There are plans to build a new base in the Metina area of Duhok governorate in Iraqi Kurdistan Region as of April 2021. In total, Turkey has stationed around 5,000 to 10,000 soldiers in Iraq.
Kosovo	Prizren: Sultan Murat Kışlası, Mamusha	An estimated 321 troops serve in the Kosovo Security Battalion command for UNMIK mission and KFOR peacekeeping force's.
Libya	Tripolitania: al-Watiya, Mitiga, Misrata and Zwara	The number of Turkish soldiers stationed in Libya is unknown.
Qatar	Doha: Katar TSK Kara Unsur Komutanlığı	5,000 personnel.
Somalia	Mogadishu: Camp TURKSOM	2,000 personnel.
Sudan	Suakin, Khartoum	On 17 January 2018, as part of a rapprochement with Sudan, Turkey was granted a 99-year lease over Suakin island. Turkey plans to restore the ruined Ottoman port city on the island.
Syria	Turkish army of northern Syria: Al-Bab, Al-Rai, Akhtarin, Afrin, Jindires, Rajo and Jarablus	5,000 personnel in Euphrates Shield and Olive Branch regions. New bases were followed at south of Afrin canton in Atme and Darat Izza There are 114 Turkish bases in Syria as of January 2022. After operation Peace Spring, approximately 6,400 personnel are working around the Peace Spring region between Ras al-Ayn and Tell Abyad. 19 observation points are settled around Idlib and Aleppo Province. Altogether, there are an estimated 10,500 Turkish soldiers and 250 tanks stationed in Turkish existence of northern Syria. These numbers are constantly subject to modifications.

== United Arab Emirates ==
Country	Location	Details
Libya	Al-Khadim Airport near Marj.	A forward operating base

== United Kingdom ==
The United Kingdom has thirteen overseas military bases.

Country	Location	Details
Belize	Price Barracks, Ladyville	British Army Training and Support Unit Belize
Bahrain	Mina Salman	United Kingdom Naval Support Facility
Brunei	Seria	British Forces Brunei
Canada	CFB Suffield	British Army Training Unit Suffield
Cyprus	Troodos Station	British Forces Cyprus
Germany	Westfalen Garrison	British Army Germany
Kenya	Nanyuki	British Army Training Unit Kenya
Nepal	Pokhara Camp, Dharan Station	British Gurkhas Nepal
Norway	Bardufoss Air Station and Camp Viking	Camp Viking opened in 2023.
Oman	Duqm	Omani-British Joint Training Area and the UK Joint Logistics Support Base
Qatar	RAF Al Udeid	
Singapore	Sembawang Naval Base	British Defence Singapore Support Unit
United Arab Emirates	Al Minhad Air Base	Donnelly Lines

== United States ==
Foreign bases of the United States

The U.S. military maintains hundreds of military installations, both inside the United States and overseas, with at least 128 military bases in 55 countries and territories, as of February 2025. Some American bases are also NATO-led with forces from multiple countries. Camp Humphreys in South Korea is the largest overseas base in terms of area. Most of these foreign military installations are located in NATO countries, Middle East countries, South Korea and Japan.

Countries with U.S. bases include:

=== Africa ===
Country	Location	Details
Cameroon	Cameroonian Air Force Base 301, Contingency Location Garoua	The base is used to support military operations against Boko Haram. Approximately 200 personnel work at the site.
Djibouti	Camp Lemonnier, CSL Chabelley	Camp Lemonnier is the largest U.S. base in Africa with more than 4,000 military personnel.
Kenya	Camp Simba	Second largest U.S. base in Africa. Over 600 U.S. military personnel work at Camp Simba.
Seychelles	United States drone base in Seychelles	Surveillance of al-Shabaab over Somalia.

=== Americas ===
Country	Location	Details
Aruba (Netherlands)	Queen Beatrix International Airport	Cooperative Security Location of U.S. Southern Command
Ascension Island (UK)	Ascension Island Auxiliary Airfield	The facility is home to a U.S. Space Force ground tracking station in support of the Eastern Range and rocket launches from Cape Canaveral Space Force Station in Florida.
Bahamas	Atlantic Undersea Test and Evaluation Center	AUTEC is a laboratory that performs integrated three-dimensional hydrospace/aerospace trajectory measurements covering the entire spectrum of undersea simulated warfare. Its mission is to assist in establishing and maintaining the naval ability of the United States through testing, evaluation, and underwater research.
(NATO) Canada	CFB North Bay	North Bay's air force base is the centre for the air defence of all of Canada and works in concert with the United States via NORAD for the air defence of the Canada-U.S. portion of the North American continent.
Cuba	Guantanamo Bay Naval Base	The military facility has over 8,500 U.S. sailors and Marines stationed there.
Curaçao (Netherlands)	Curaçao International Airport	U.S. Air Force Forward Operating Base
El Salvador	El Salvador International Airport	Cooperative Security Location of U.S. Southern Command
(NATO) Greenland (Denmark)	Pituffik Space Base	Around 150 people are stationed at Pituffik. The U.S. Space Force's northernmost base, and the northernmost installation of the U.S. Armed Forces. The base is home to a substantial portion of the global network of missile warning sensors of Space Delta 4, and space surveillance and space control sensors of Space Delta 2, providing space awareness and advanced missile detection capabilities to North American Aerospace Defense Command (NORAD), the United States Space Force, and joint partners.
Honduras	Soto Cano Air Base	Soto Cano Air Base houses 1,200–1,500 U.S. troops and is also used by the Honduran Air Force academy.

=== Asia ===
Country	Location	Details
Bahrain	Naval Support Activity Bahrain; Isa Air Base	Naval Support Activity Bahrain is home to approximately 8,500 military personnel. The mission of NSA Bahrain is to provide Operational Support to U.S. and Coalition Forces operating throughout the United States Central Command area of responsibility.
British Indian Ocean Territory (UK)	Naval Support Facility Diego Garcia, Camp Thunder Cove	United States forces have used Diego Garcia since at least the mid-1960s, under lease from the United Kingdom. The island has port facilities and an airstrip capable of handling large aircraft. Currently, 1,700 military personnel reside there.
Israel	Dimona Radar Facility	A radar facility near Dimona, owned and operated by the United States.
Japan	United States Forces Japan	There are 54,000 U.S. military personnel based in Japan – the highest number stationed anywhere overseas.
Jordan	Muwaffaq Salti Air Base	Jordan hosts about 3,000 American troops. Muwaffaq Salti Air Base is reported to host several MQ-9 Reaper drones, based on satellite imagery. The base is partly operated by the 407th Air Expeditionary Group.
Kuwait	Ali Al Salem Air Base; Camp Arifjan; Camp Buehring; Kuwait Naval Base	Approximately 13,500 U.S. forces are based in Kuwait, primarily at Camp Arifjan and Ali al-Salem Air Base.
Philippines	Antonio Bautista Air Base; Basa Air Base; Benito Ebuen Air Base; Fort Magsaysay; Lumbia Airport; Balabac Island; Camp Melchor Dela Cruz; Lal-lo Airport; Naval Base Camilo Osias	All closed in 1992.
Qatar	Al Udeid Air Base	Al Udeid Air Base is the biggest U.S. military installation in the Middle East and can house more than 10,000 U.S. troops.
Saudi Arabia	Prince Sultan Air Base	More than 2,700 U.S. forces are stationed at the Prince Sultan Air Base.
Singapore	Paya Lebar Air Base, Changi Naval Base, Changi Air Base	Singapore hosts more than 800 U.S. military personnel, civilians, and family members.
South Korea	United States Forces Korea	Approximately 28,500 U.S. troops are based in South Korea.
Thailand	U-Tapao Royal Thai Navy Airfield	The extent of the US presence here is disputed, but according to Politico, the Pentagon rents space from a contractor at U-Tapao Royal Thai Navy Airfield, allowing officials to say there's no official "base."
United Arab Emirates	Al Dhafra Air Base	The UAE hosts 5,000 US military personnel at Al Dhafra Air Base.

=== Europe ===
Country	Location	Details
(NATO) Albania	SOCEUR base under construction in Tirana	
(NATO) Belgium	Chièvres Air Base; Kleine Brogel Air Base	
Bosnia and Herzegovina	NATO Headquarters Sarajevo	
(NATO) Bulgaria	Aitos Logistics Center; Bezmer Air Base; Graf Ignatievo Air Base; Novo Selo Range	
Akrotiri and Dhekelia (UK)	RAF Akrotiri	
(NATO) Estonia	Ämari Air Base	
(NATO) Germany	U.S. Military Installations in Germany; Panzer Kaserne; Ramstein Air Base; Spangdahlem Air Base; Baumholder Army Post; Landstuhl Regional Medical Center; Sembach Army Post;	
(NATO) Greece	Alexandroupoli Army Base, Larisa Air Base, Araxos Air Base, Souda Bay Naval Base	
(NATO) Iceland	Naval Air Station Keflavík	
(NATO) Italy	Caserma Ederle-Caserma Del Din; Darby Military Community; Naval Air Station Sigonella; Naval Support Activity Naples; Aviano Air Base	
Kosovo	Camp Bondsteel	
(NATO) Lithuania	Camp Herkus, Pabradė	
(NATO) Netherlands	Volkel Air Base; USCG Activities Europe	
(NATO) Norway	Marine Corps garrison at Værnes Air Station	
(NATO) Poland	Camp Kościuszko; Powidz Air Base; Łask Air Base; NSF Redzikowo	
(NATO) Portugal	Lajes Field	
(NATO) Romania	Mihail Kogălniceanu Air Base; Câmpia Turzii Air Base; Deveselu Military Base; Cincu Training Center	
(NATO) Spain	Morón Air Base; Naval Station Rota; Madrid Deep Space Communications Complex	
(NATO) Turkey	Incirlik Air Base, Izmir Air Station, Kürecik Radar Station, Ankara Support Facility	
(NATO) United Kingdom	RAF Alconbury; RAF Croughton; RAF Fairford; RAF Lakenheath; RAF Menwith Hill; RAF Mildenhall; RAF Welford	

=== Oceania ===
Country	Location	Details
Australia	Pine Gap; Marine Rotational Force – Darwin;	Pine Gap is a massive computer complex with 38 radomes protecting radio dishes and operates with over 800 employees. The location is strategically significant because it controls United States spy satellites as they pass over one-third of the globe, including China, North Korea, the Asian parts of Russia, and the Middle East. Central Australia was chosen because it was too remote for spy ships passing in international waters to intercept its signals. One of its roles is to detect and geolocate the source of electronic signals, such as those emitted by mobile phones. This information is used by the US military to identify and geolocate targets of interest, which it can then attack using special forces or lethal unmanned drones, for example.
Marshall Islands	Kwajalein Airfield, Kwajalein Atoll	United States Army airfield, the entirety of Kwajalein Atoll is a military base.

== See also ==
- Power projection
- Mobile offshore base
- Military base
- Piardoba Airfield

== Notes ==
Suspected/unconfirmed presence of Egyptian military bases in Eritrea, a Saudi island, and in Somalia.
