= List of Russian military bases abroad =

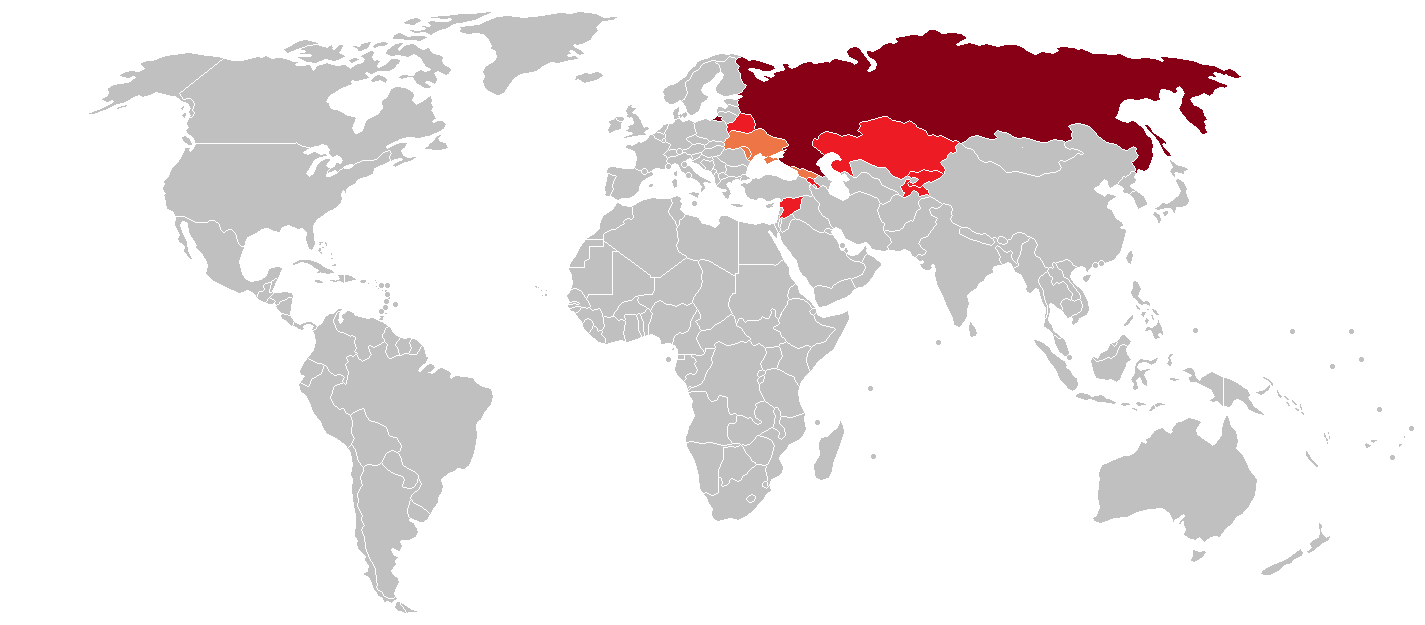
Russian military bases abroad in 2023

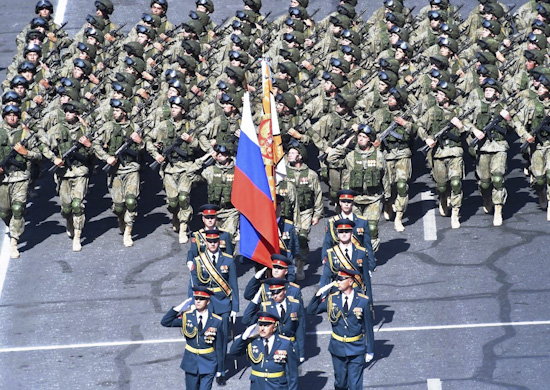
Troops of the Russian 102nd Military Base at Republic Square, Yerevan during the 2016 Armenian Independence Day military parade.

This article lists military bases of Russia abroad. The majority of Russia's military bases and facilities are located in former Soviet republics; which in Russian political parlance is termed the "near abroad".

Following the dissolution of the Soviet Union, many of the early-warning radar stations ended up in former Soviet republics. As of 2020, only the radar in Belarus is still rented by Russia.

In 2003, Kommersant newspaper published a map of the Russian military presence abroad. In 2018, it was reported that Russia operates at least 21 significant military facilities overseas.

For the list of military bases inside of Russia and occupied territories, see List of Russian military bases.

== Map ==
Map of current military installations (excluding Crimea)

== Current bases ==
Country	Details	No. of personnel
Armenia	Russian 102nd Military Base in Gyumri and the Russian 3624th Airbase in Erebuni Airport near Yerevan.	Est. 3,214 to 5,000
Belarus	Russian military presence in Belarus: The Baranavichy Radar Station, the Vileyka naval communication centre near Vileyka and a joint Air Force and Air Defense training center in Baranovichi	Est. 1,500
Kazakhstan	The Baikonur Cosmodrome is rented to Russia but is now under civilian administration. The Sary Shagan anti-ballistic missile testing range and the Kambala air base are also operated by Russia.	
Kyrgyzstan	The 999th Air Base (military unit 20022), the 954th test base of anti-submarine weapons (military unit 87366), the 338th naval communication centre (military unit 45682) and the 17th radio-seismic laboratory of the seismic service of the Ministry of Defence of the Russian Federation.	
Tajikistan	Russian 201st Military Base, Okno space surveillance station.	Est. 7,500
Syria	Tartus naval base, Khmeimim Air Base.	Est. 7,000
Libya	Russian forces operate from LNA-controlled facilities, including port of Tobruk, Al-Khadim and Al Jufra Airbase.	Est. 1,800+
Central African Republic	Joint Russo-CAR training base in Berengo.	Est. 2,100
Niger	Russian forces were moved into base 101 used by U.S. forces until 2024 after the military took control of Niger during the 2023 coup d'état.	Est. 300
Burkina Faso	Russian Africa Corps instructors were deployed in 2024 at the Loumbila training base near Ouagadougou.	Est. 100 to 300
Mali	Russian Africa Corps personnel are deployed at Malian military sites, including Bamako and central Mali bases.	Est. 1,500 to 2,000
Equatorial Guinea	Russian instructors were deployed to Equatorial Guinea to train elite guards for the presidency.	Est. 200
Ukraine Russia (disputed)	Sevastopol Naval Base of the Black Sea Fleet, in Crimea, rented by Russia prior to the annexation of Crimea by the Russian Federation in 2014. In July 2015, Russian prime minister Dmitry Medvedev said that Crimea had been fully integrated into Russia so the base in Sevastopol is no longer classed by Russia as overseas. However, this is contested; United Nations General Assembly Resolution 68/262 rejected Russia's annexation of Crimea, which Russia defended by saying it was supporting the outcome of the 2014 Crimean status referendum, in which a majority voted to rejoin Russia. As of 2016, there were at least 18 Russian military facilities in Crimea, including five air bases: Belbek Air Base, Saky, Gvardeyskoye, Kirovske, Dzhankoi.	Est. 26,000+
Japan Russia (disputed)	Russian military facilities and personnel as the 18th Machine Gun Artillery Division are stationed on the southern Kuril Islands (Iturup, Kunashir, Shikotan and the Habomai islets), which are administered by Russia but claimed by Japan as the “Northern Territories”, making their status internationally disputed.	Est. 3,500
Georgia South Ossetia (disputed)	Following the Russo-Georgian War in 2008, Russia has maintained a large presence in the partially recognised states of Abkhazia and South Ossetia. The Russian 4th Military Base is located in South Ossetia and hosts approximately 3,500 personnel.	Est. 3,500
Georgia Abkhazia (disputed)	Following the Russo-Georgian War in 2008, Russia has maintained a large presence in the partially recognised states of Abkhazia and South Ossetia. The Russian 7th Military Base is located in Abkhazia and hosts approximately 4,500 personnel. In 2024 an agreement was signed for the creation of a Russian naval base with the separatist Republic of Abkhazia at Ochamchire.	Est. 4,500
Moldova Transnistria (disputed)	Russia maintains an operational group of forces in the Transnistria separatist region of Moldova to guard an ammunition depot at Cobasna.	Est. 1,500

== Former bases ==
Country	Details
Afghanistan	Soviet troops in Afghanistan from 1979 to 1989.
Albania	Pasha Liman Naval Base was used by the Soviet Navy between 1955 and 1962.
Austria	Central Group of Forces from 1945 to 1955.
Azerbaijan	Gabala Radar Station was rented until 2012. In 2013 the building itself was transferred to Azerbaijan, but the equipment was dismantled and transported to Russia.
(Lithuania) (Latvia) (Estonia) Baltic states	North Western Group of Forces from 1991 to 1994.
Kampuchea	Port of Kompong Som Naval Base was used by the Soviet Navy between 1980 and 1992.
China	Tuchengzi and Yingchengzi Air Bases along with Port Arthur Naval Base were used by the Soviet Navy between 1945 and 1956. Air bases in Shanghai were used by the Soviet Air Force from 1949 to 1953.
Cuba	Lourdes SIGINT station was closed in 2002. In July 2014, after Putin's visit to Cuba, there were rumors about its reactivation, quickly officially denied.
Czechoslovakia	Central Group of Forces from 1968 to 1991.
Ethiopia	During the Derg, Nokra is the base of the Soviet Navy between 1977 and 1991, while the Asmara airbase was the base of the Soviet Air Forces.
Georgia	In 1995, Russia and Georgia signed a 25-year agreement for rental of military bases in Vaziani, Akhalkalaki and Batumi. Due to the Rose Revolution eventually the Russian bases were liquidated by 2007, with the exception of the breakaway territories of Abkhazia and South Ossetia. See Russia–Georgia relations.
East Germany	Western Group of Forces from 1945 to 1994.
Finland	Porkkala Naval Base was used by the Soviet Navy between 1944 and 1956.
Finland	Hanko Naval Base was used by the Soviet Navy between 1940 and 1941.
North Korea	25th Army from 1945 to 1948.
Hungary	Central, then Southern Group of Forces from 1944 to 1991.
Kazakhstan	The Balkhash Radar Station was removed from service in June 2020.
Mongolia	Soviet troops in Mongolia from 1921 to 1927, 1939 to 1951, and 1962 to 1992.
Poland	Northern Group of Forces from 1945 to 1993.
Romania	Southern Group of Forces from 1944 to 1958.
Syria	Tiyas Air Base, Shayrat Airbase
Uzbekistan	Karshi-Khanabad Air Base from 2006 to 2012, when Uzbekistan was part of the Collective Security Treaty Organization.
Vietnam	Cam Ranh Air Base and Cam Ranh Naval Base were used by the Soviet Navy and the Russian Navy between 1979 and 2002.
South Yemen	Socotra was used as a base by the Soviet Navy between 1976 and 1979.

== Planned ==
Country	Details
Sudan	Confirmed to be building a Russian naval base along the Red Sea coast.

== See also ==
- Wagner Group
- Power projection
- Russian military presence in Belarus
- Russian military presence in Transnistria
- List of American military installations § Foreign bases and facilities
- List of countries with overseas military bases
