= Ozerechye =

Settlement in Belarus

Coordinates: 52.8508°N 26.4897°E

Ozerechye (Russian: Озеречье, Belarusian: Азярэчча, romanized: Aziarečča) is a rural settlement in the Klyetsk district, Minsk region, Belarus, near the border with Brest region

It has the status of a closed military townlet (known as Kletsk-2 before 1994), because it is the place of residence of military and civil personnel servicing the Baranovichi radio-technical node (Volga radar station), an element of the Russian missile warning system.

== See also ==
- Russian military presence in Belarus
