= Closed military town =

Closed military town may refer to:

- Closed military townlet
- Military-purpose closed city
