= Stefano Castagnotto =

Stefano Castagnotto (born 2 June 1956) is an Italian army officer, of Major General rank, who served as the force commander of EUFOR Althea in Bosnia and Herzegovina from 4 December 2008 until 3 December 2009. Castagnotto is an artillery officer and has served in logistics positions, including as deputy head of the Logistics Division of the General Staff of the Italian Army from 2005 to 2008.
