= Military Townlet, Novosibirsk =

Military Townlet
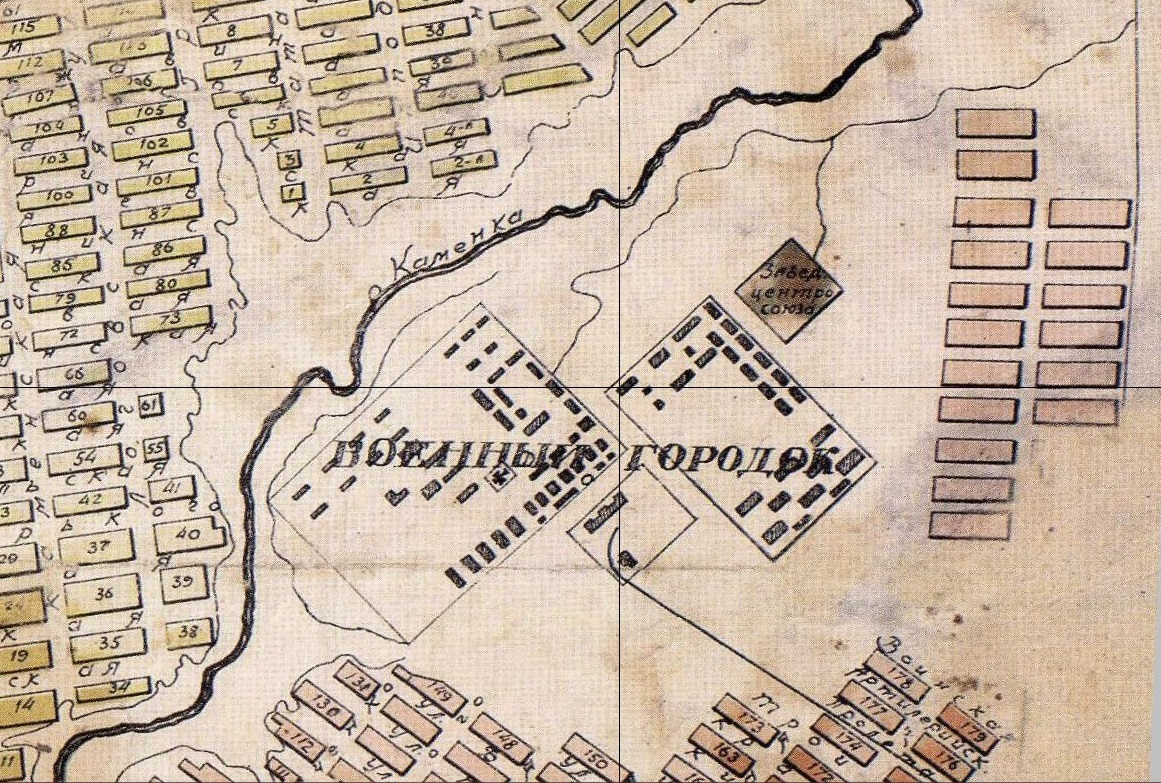
- Military Townlet, map of 1924.
- Interactive map of Military Townlet
- Coordinates: 55.031°N 82.962°E
- Country: Russia
- City: Novosibirsk
- District: Oktyabrsky District

Military Townlet (Russian: Военный городок) is a building complex in Oktyabrsky District of Novosibirsk, Russia. It was built in 1910–1913. New buildings also appeared during the Soviet period.

It is located between Topolyovaya, Voennaya, Voinskaya and Boris Bogatkov streets and occupies an area of 85 hectares.

== History ==
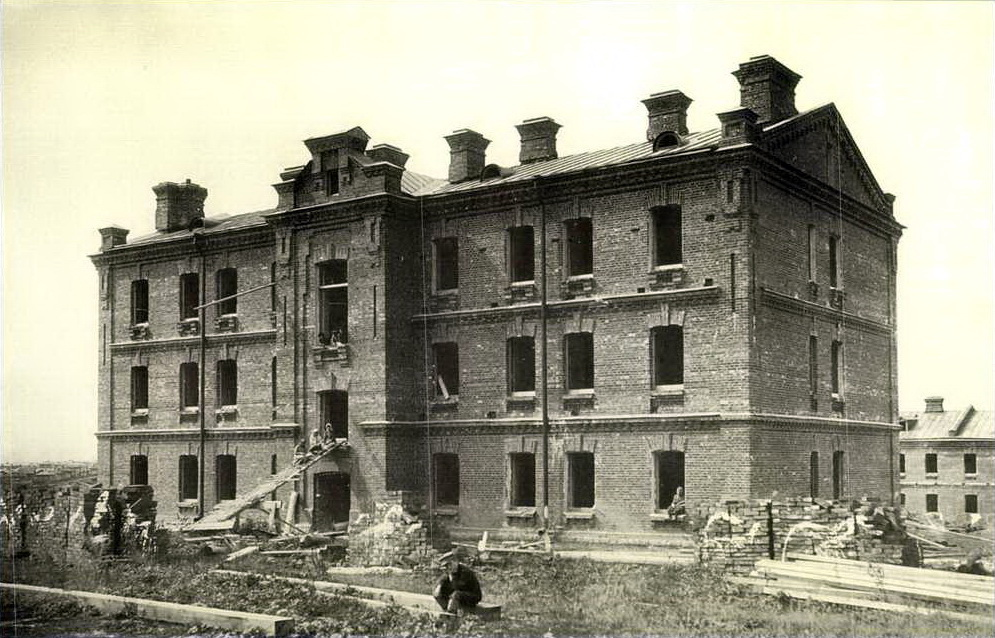
Construction of the residential building for twelve junior single officers, 1913.

=== Construction ===
In 1909, the City Public Administration of Novonikolayevsk (current Novosibirsk) transferred a place of 60 dessiatins to the military department in exchange for the territory of The Cabinet of His Imperial Majesty (in a convenient place for the city).

The land for the future military complex was located across the Kamenka River. In the summer of 1910, the construction of military corps began, 5 million rubles were allocated for their construction.

In June 1910, the newspaper Obskaya Zhizn wrote about the large number of workers involved in the construction of the military complex. They had come from the European part of Russia. Their working day began at 5–6 a. m. and ended late in the evening. Monthly salary of workers was 18 rubles, they were also provided with free food and housing.

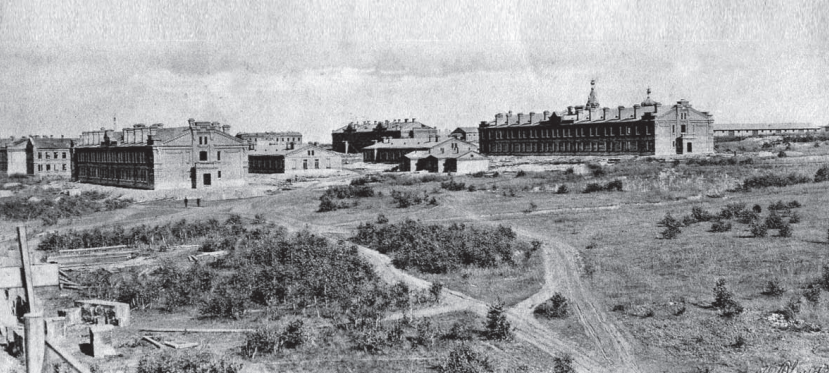
Military Townlet in 1913.

The construction of the military townlet was completed in the summer of 1913. 37 buildings were built, including barracks, residential buildings, warehouses, hospital, church, etc.

=== World War I period ===
During the First World War, the number of military units noticeably increased in Novonikolaevsk. The lack of places in the military townlet contributed to the fact that many military institutions began to be deployed outside of it. At the same time, the construction of new buildings of the military complex was postponed indefinitely due to lack of funding.

=== Russian Civil War ===
At the beginning of 1918, the detachment was formed, which consisted exclusively of volunteers from prisoners of war of the Austro-Hungarian and German armies. It was located in the military townlet and underwent additional military training here. In the spring of 1918, the detachment, led by a member of the Novonikolaevsk Council I. P. Botko, went to the Trans-Baikal Front to oppose Lieutenant General of the White Army G. S. Semyonov.

During the Civil War, Military Townlet was also occupied by the Kolchak Army, the Czechoslovak Corps and Polish legionaries. According to the recollections of residents of Novosibirsk, one of the buildings of the military complex was occupied by arrested persons (about several hundred people), including Magyars who served in the International Battalion named after Karl Marx and members of the Soviet and party apparatus of Novonikolaevsk, among whom was V. R. Romanov, chairman of the Novonikolaevsk Council of Workers' and Soldiers' Deputies.

=== Typhus epidemic ===
In the winter of 1920, a typhus epidemic spread in the town. Military doctors called it "an endangered place" and assumed that soon this district of Novonikolaevsk would turn into a cemetery.

The White Guards, who were imprisoned in the unheated stables and sheds of Military Townlet, suffered from tuberculosis, typhus and died in large numbers.

Approximately 20,000 typhoid patients were in the military complex.

=== 1938–1941 ===
In 1938–1941, a large number of new barracks and officers' houses were built in Military Townlet, which was associated with the increase in the number of troops in Novosibirsk.

=== After the Great Patriotic War ===
After the Great Patriotic War, some buildings were reconstructed. New housing for the commanding staff and buildings for the military units were also built.

== Architecture ==
=== Residential buildings for the military of the tsarist period ===
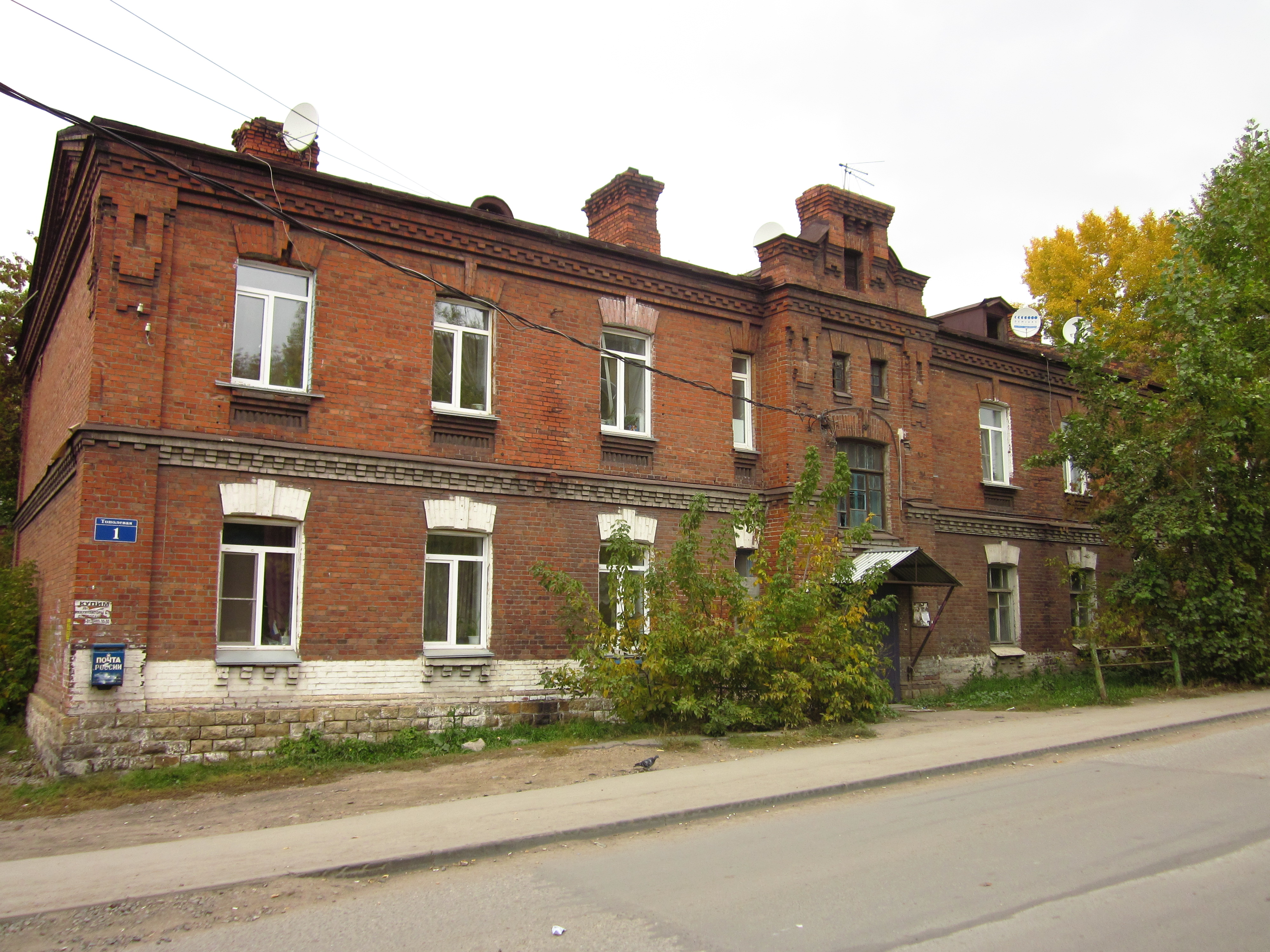
Topolyovaya Street 1

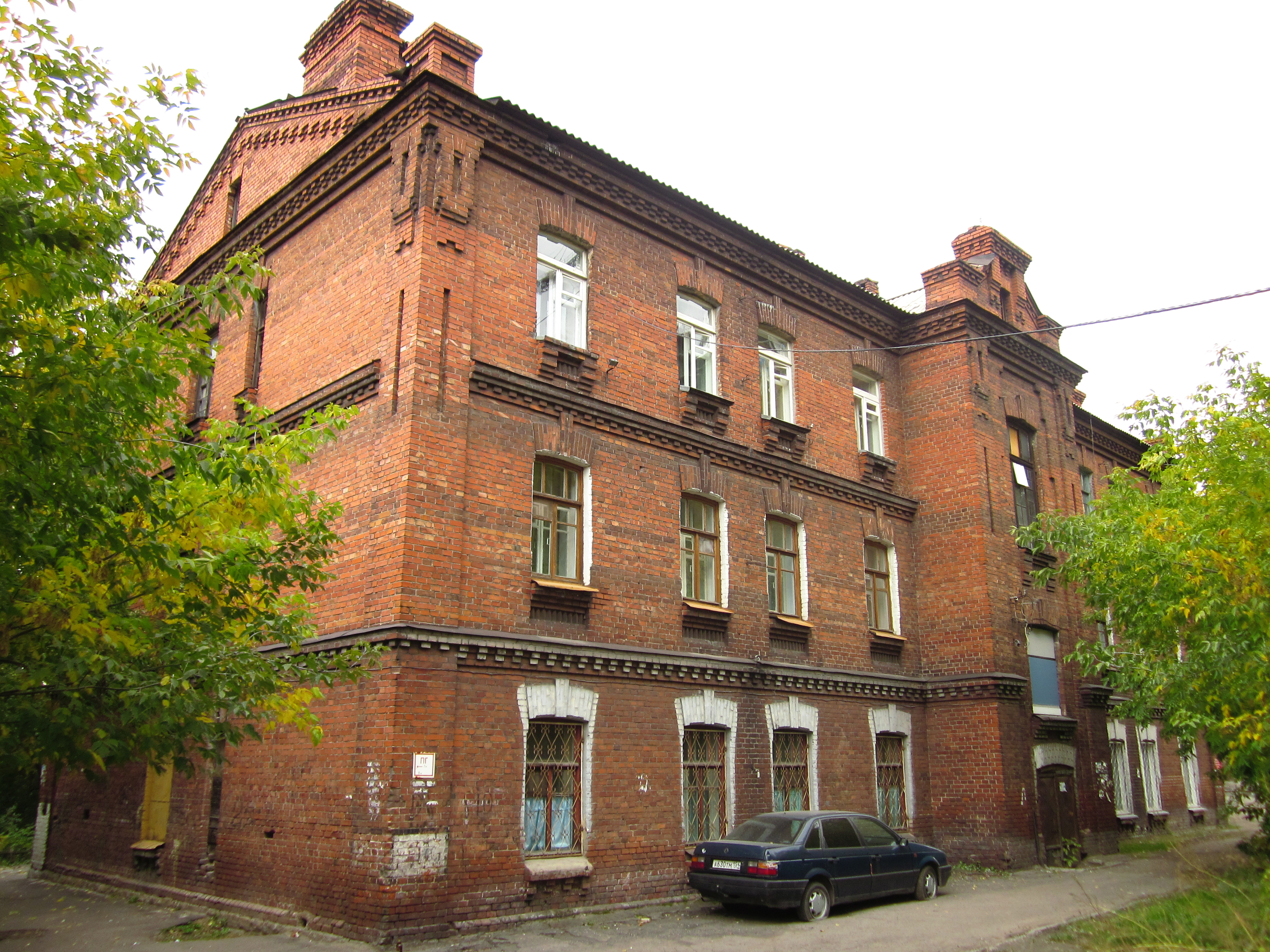
Topolyovaya Street 2

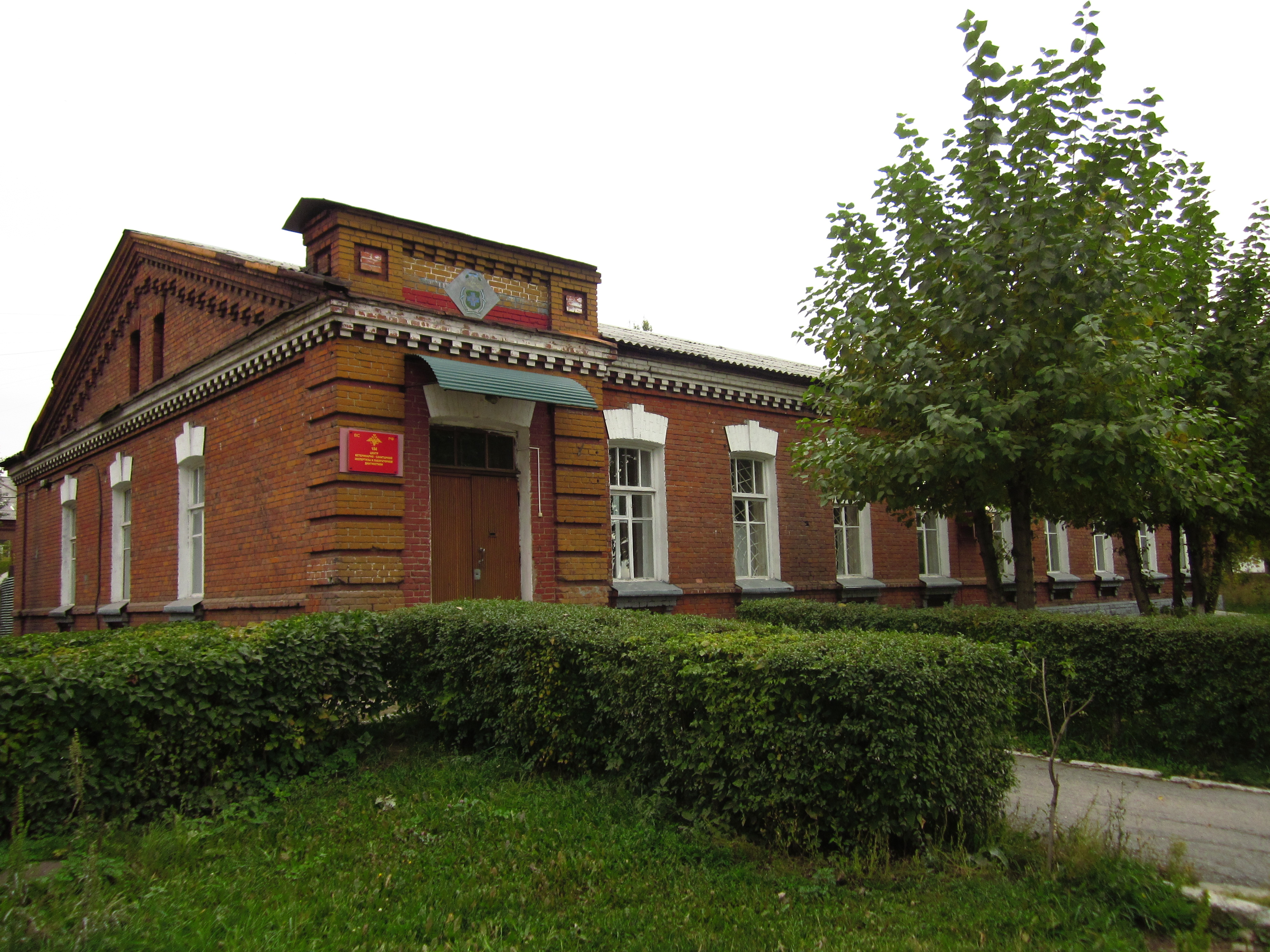
Residential building of regiment commander

- Residential building for 8 families of senior officers (Topolyovaya Street, 1)
- Residential building for 12 junior single officers (Topolyovaya Street, 2)
- Topolyovaya Street 3
- Topolyovaya Street 4
- Topolyovaya Street 5
- Topolyovaya Street 6
- Topolyovaya Street 8
- Topolyovaya Street 10
- Topolyovaya Street 12
- Topolyovaya Street 14
- Topolyovaya Street 18
- Topolyovaya Street 20
- Topolyovaya Street 22
- Topolyovaya Street 23
- Residential building (Object No. 28)
- Residential building (Object No. 51)
- Residential building (Object No. 52)
- Residential building of regiment commander (Object number 53)
- Residential building (Object No. 58)
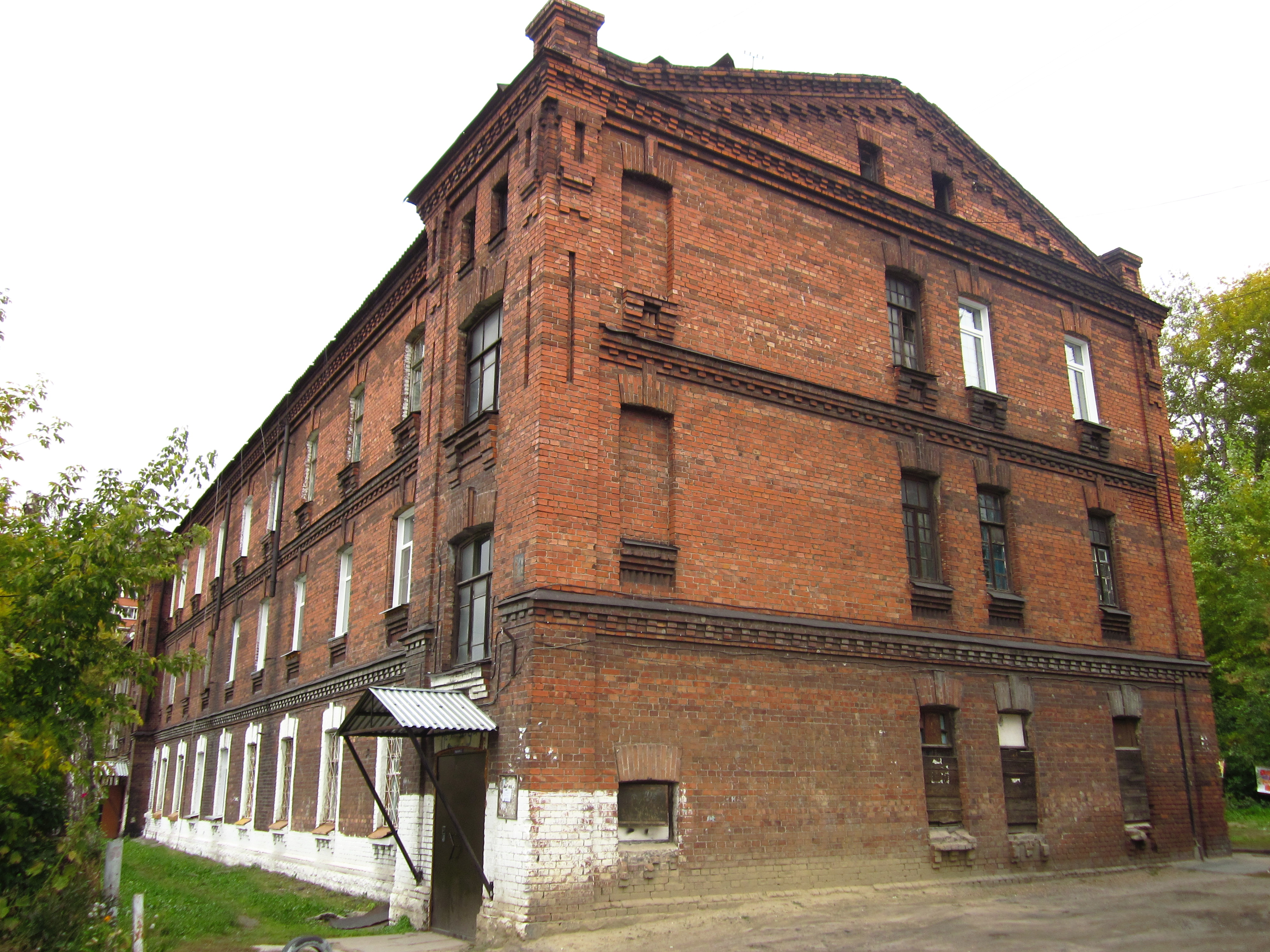
Topolyovaya Street 10

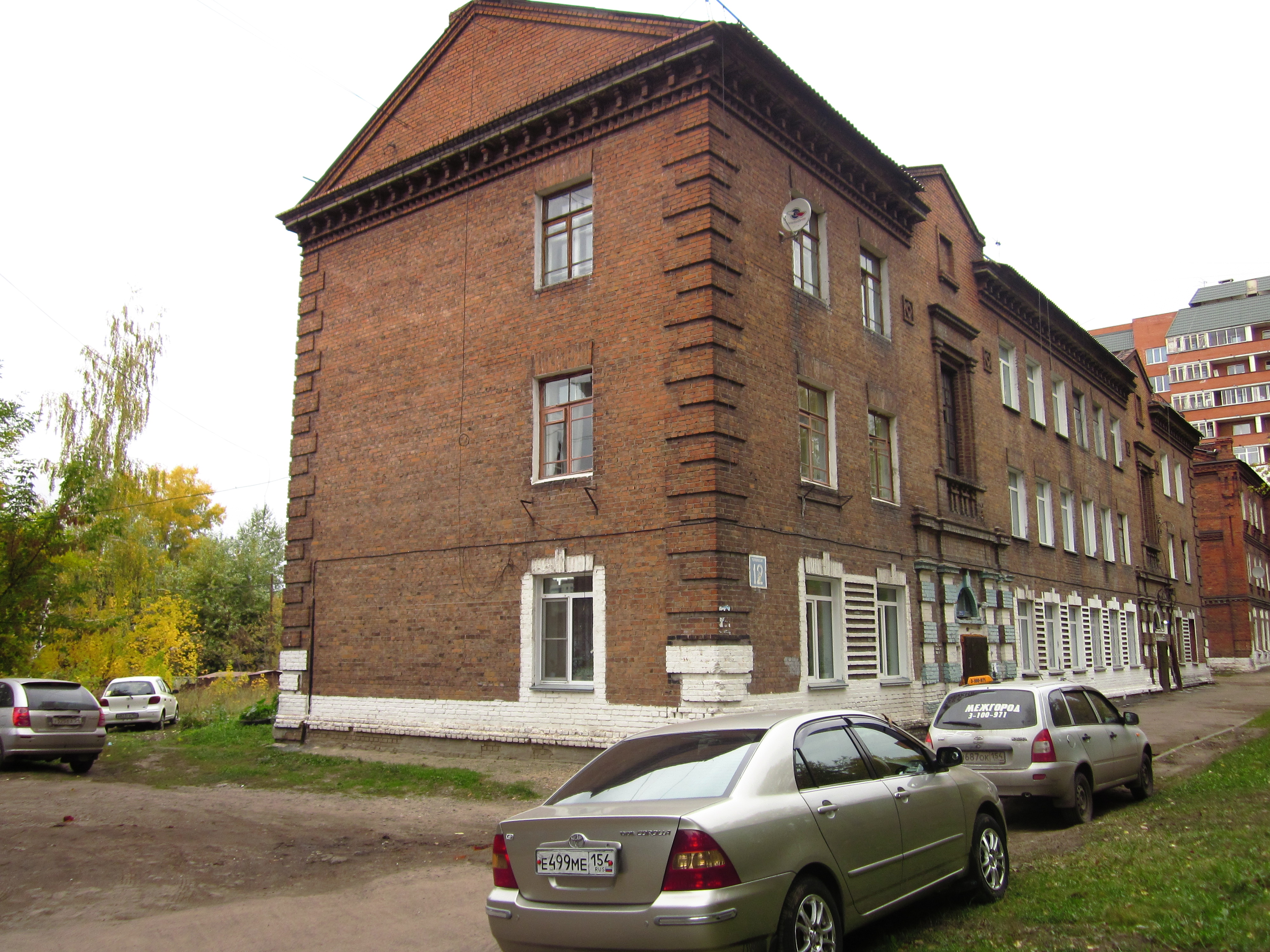
Topolyovaya Street 12

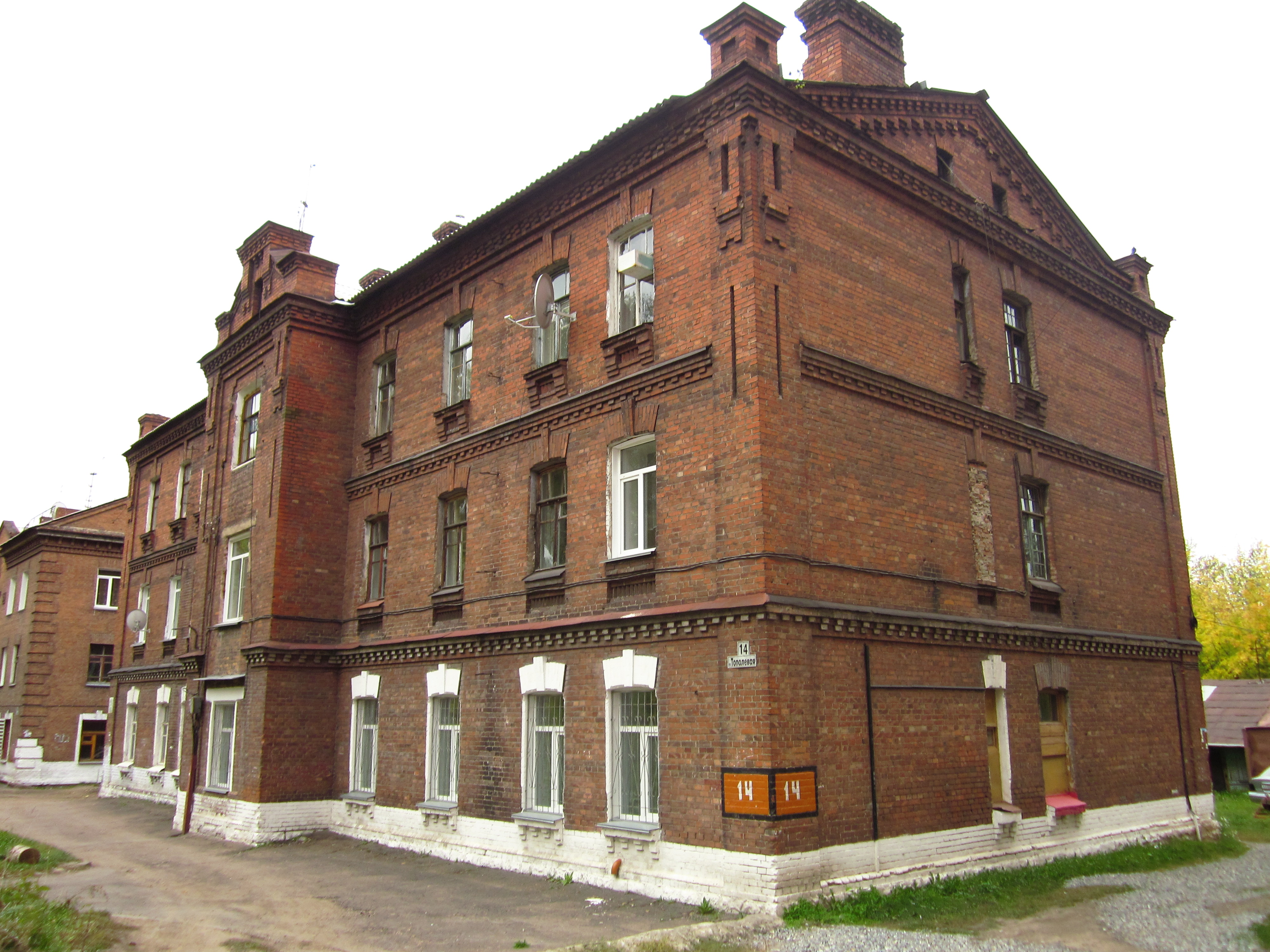
Topolyovaya Street 14

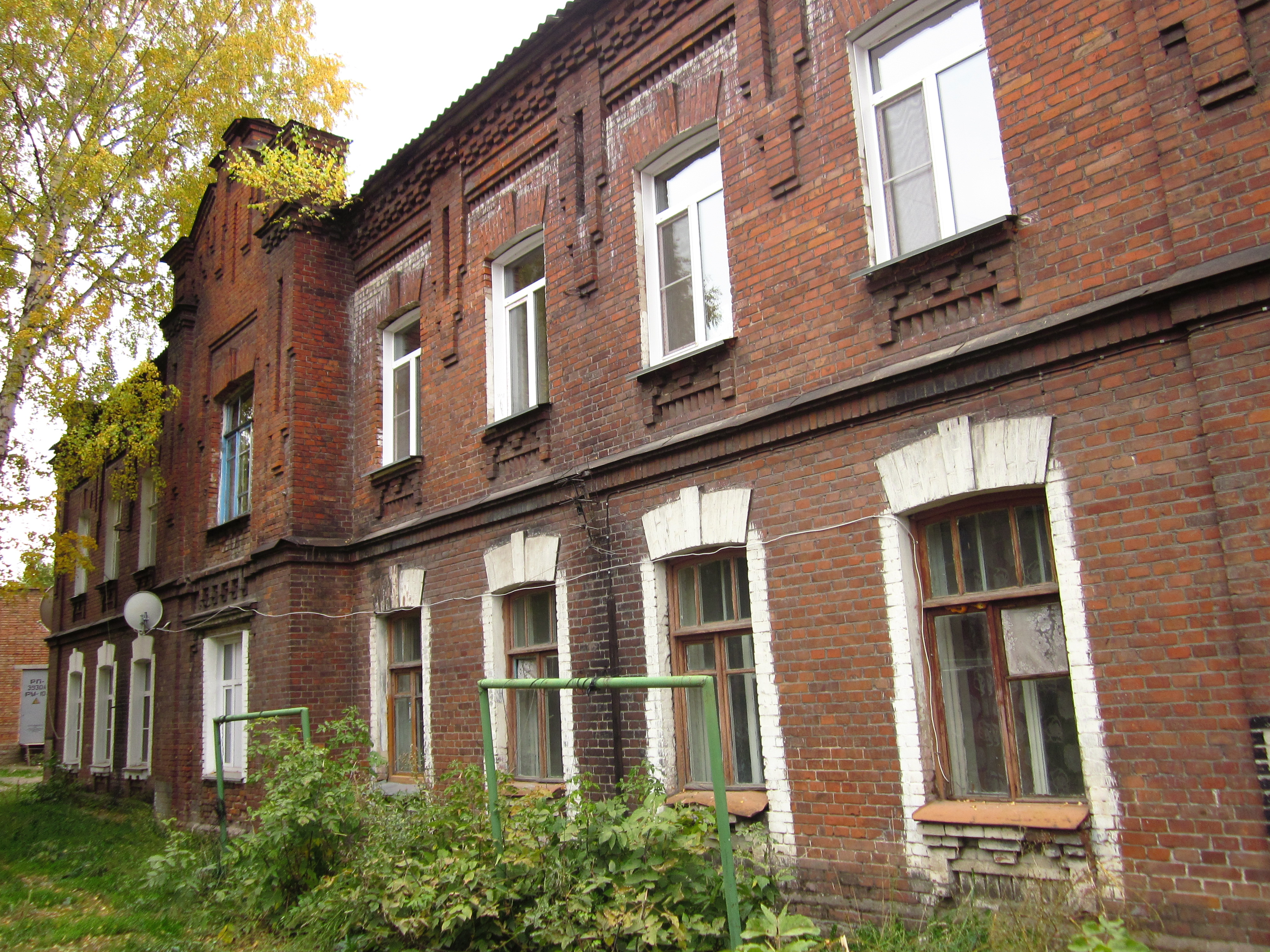
Residential building (Object No. 58)

=== Barracks ===
- Battalion barracks. Object No. 14
- Battalion barracks. Object No. 15
- Machine gun team building. Object No. 16
- Battalion barracks. Objects No. 17
- Training team building. Object No. 23
- Battalion barracks. Object No. 26
- Battalion barracks. Object No. 69
- Battalion barracks. Object No. 70
- Battalion barracks. Object No. 71

=== Ancillary facilities ===
- Warehouse. Object number 29
- Object No. 30

=== Other ===
- Waiting room. Object No. 20
- Chancery and guardhouse for junior ranks. Object No. 22
- Stable
- Officers' assembly building (Topolyovaya 17)
- Bathhouse for officers and soldiers
- District Officers' House, it was supposedly built in the 1930s.
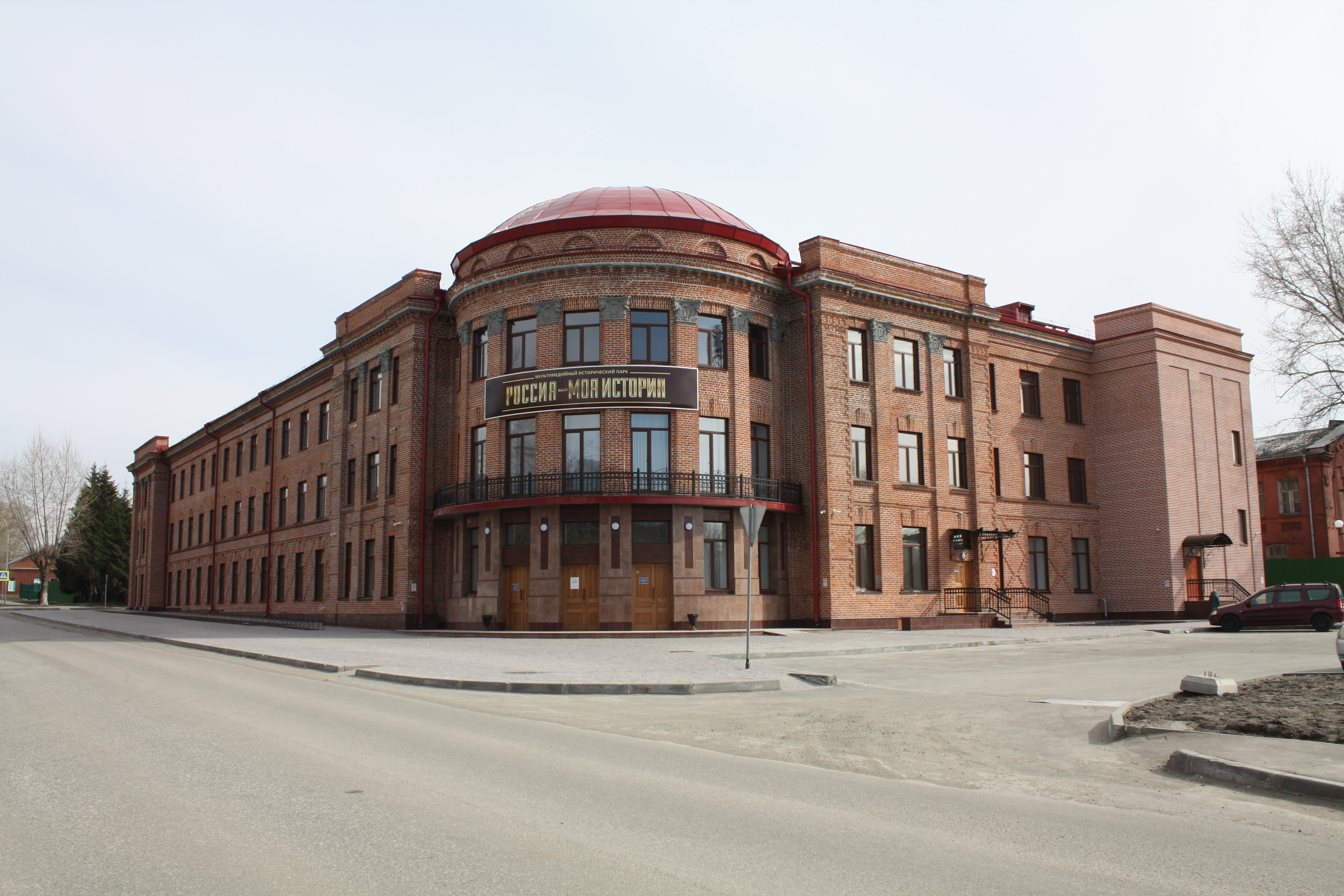
District Officers' House

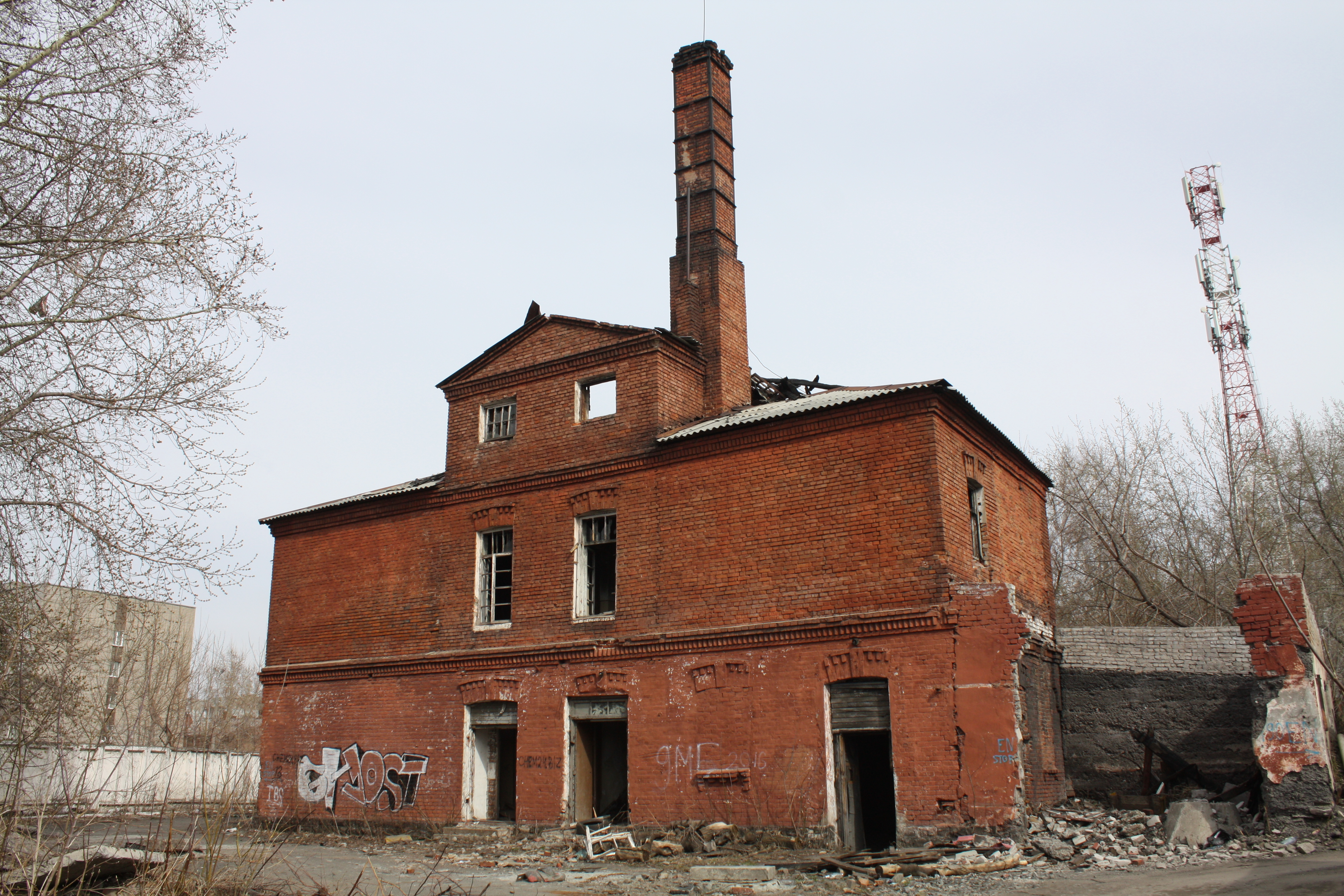
Bathhouse for officers and soldiers

=== Former buildings and structures ===
Many buildings and structures of Military Townlet have been lost over time (ammunition warehouse, stable, wagon train shed, rusk warehouse, etc.). In the 1980s, the Nikolsky Church of the Novosibirsk Garrison was destroyed.

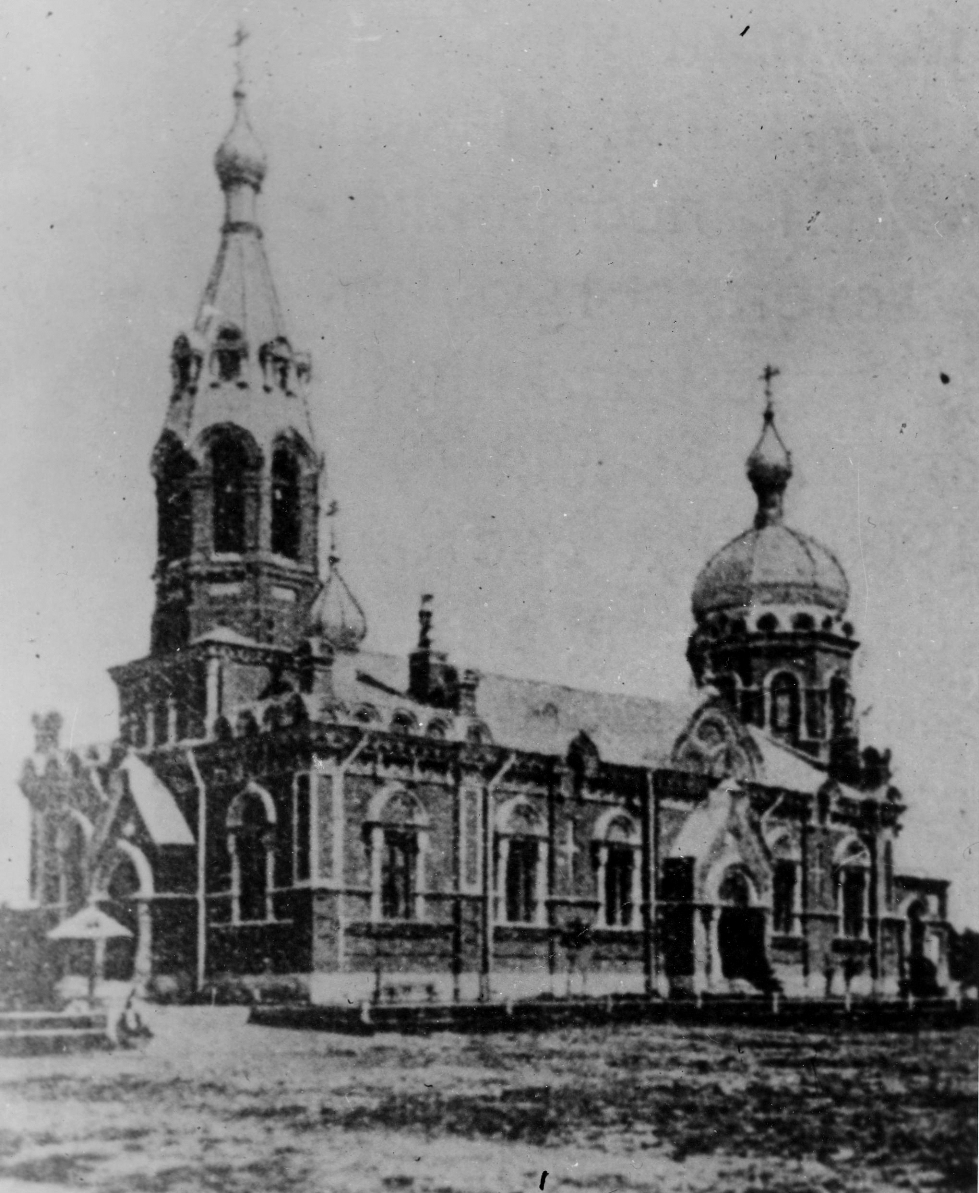
Nikolsky Church of the Novosibirsk Garrison

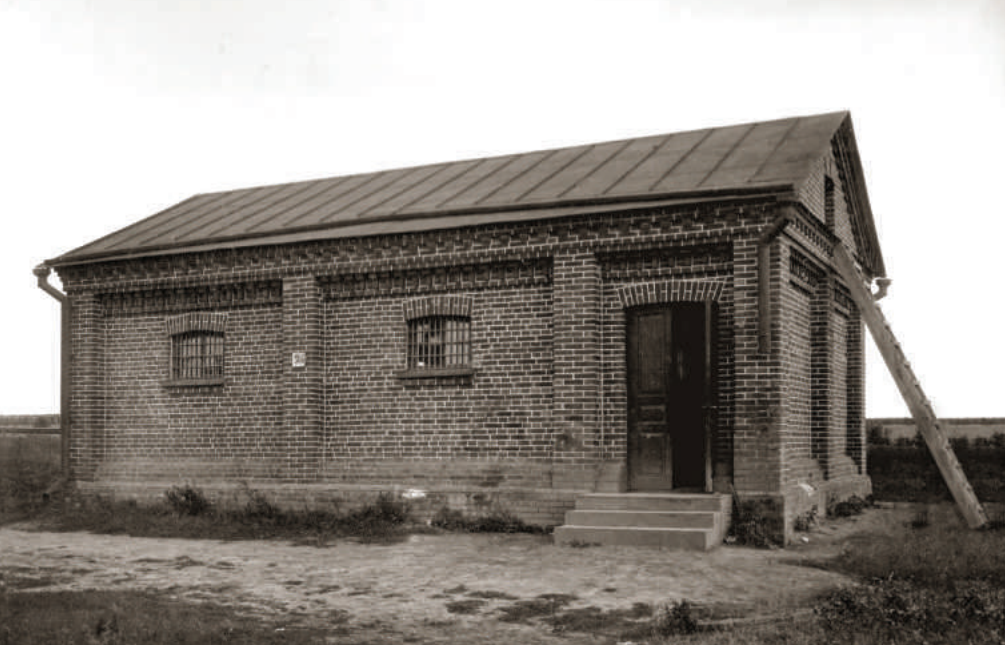
Ammunition warehouse

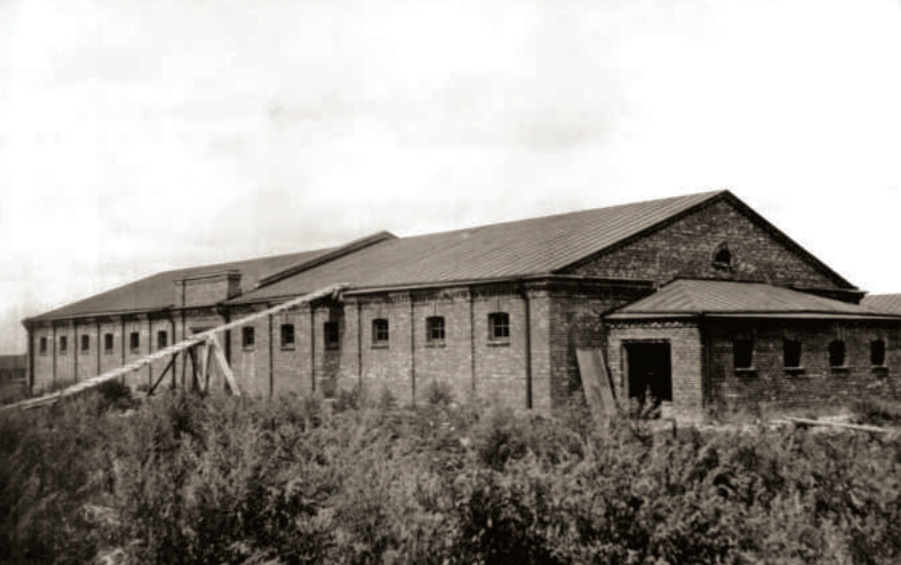
Stable

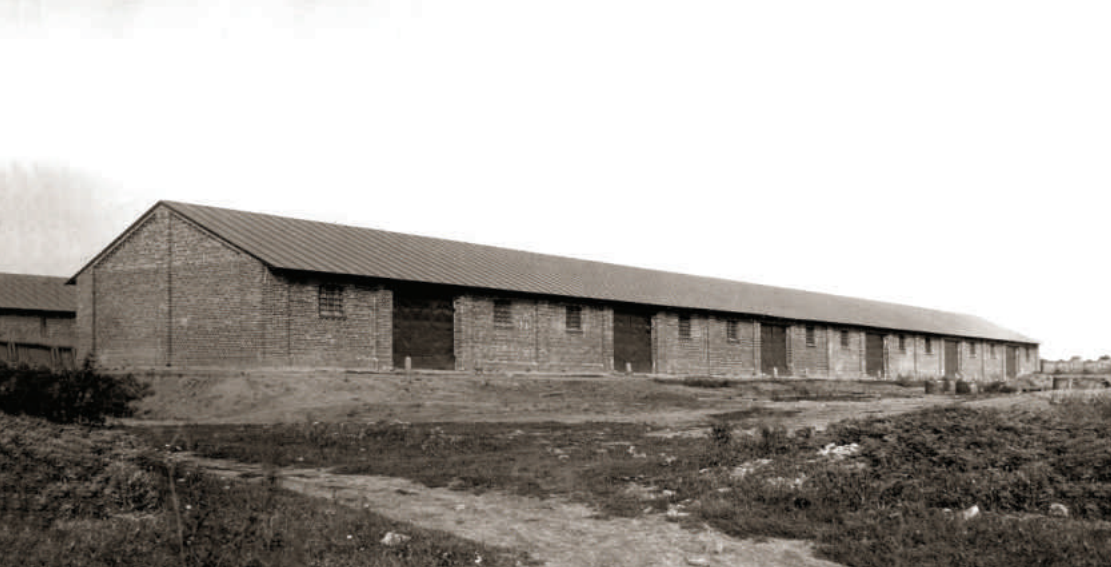
Wagon train shed

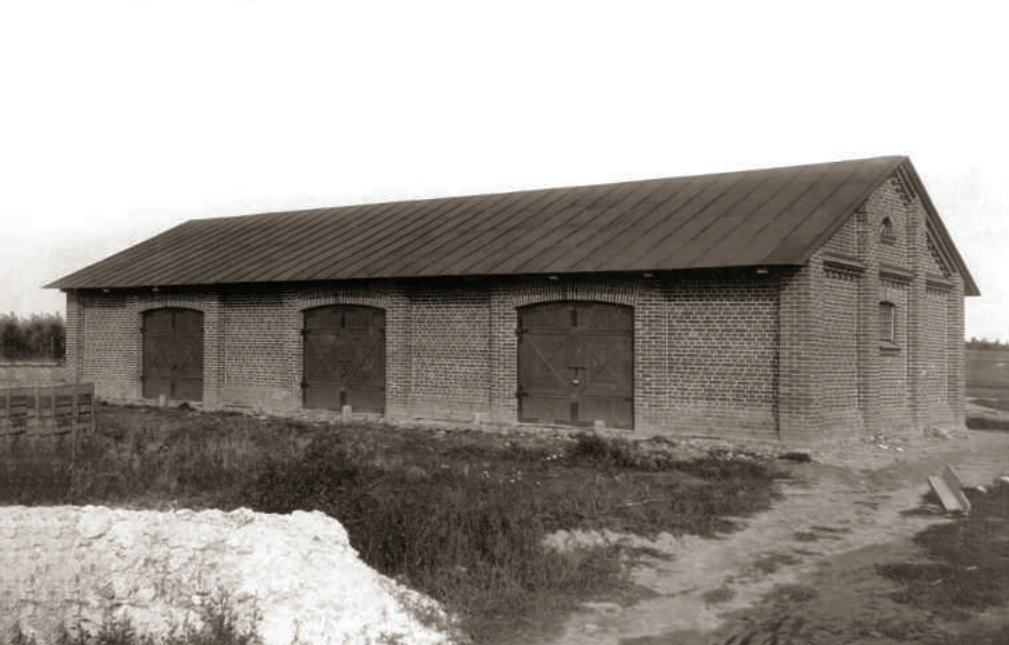
Rusk warehouse
