= Military townlet =

Urban territory for armed forces in Russia

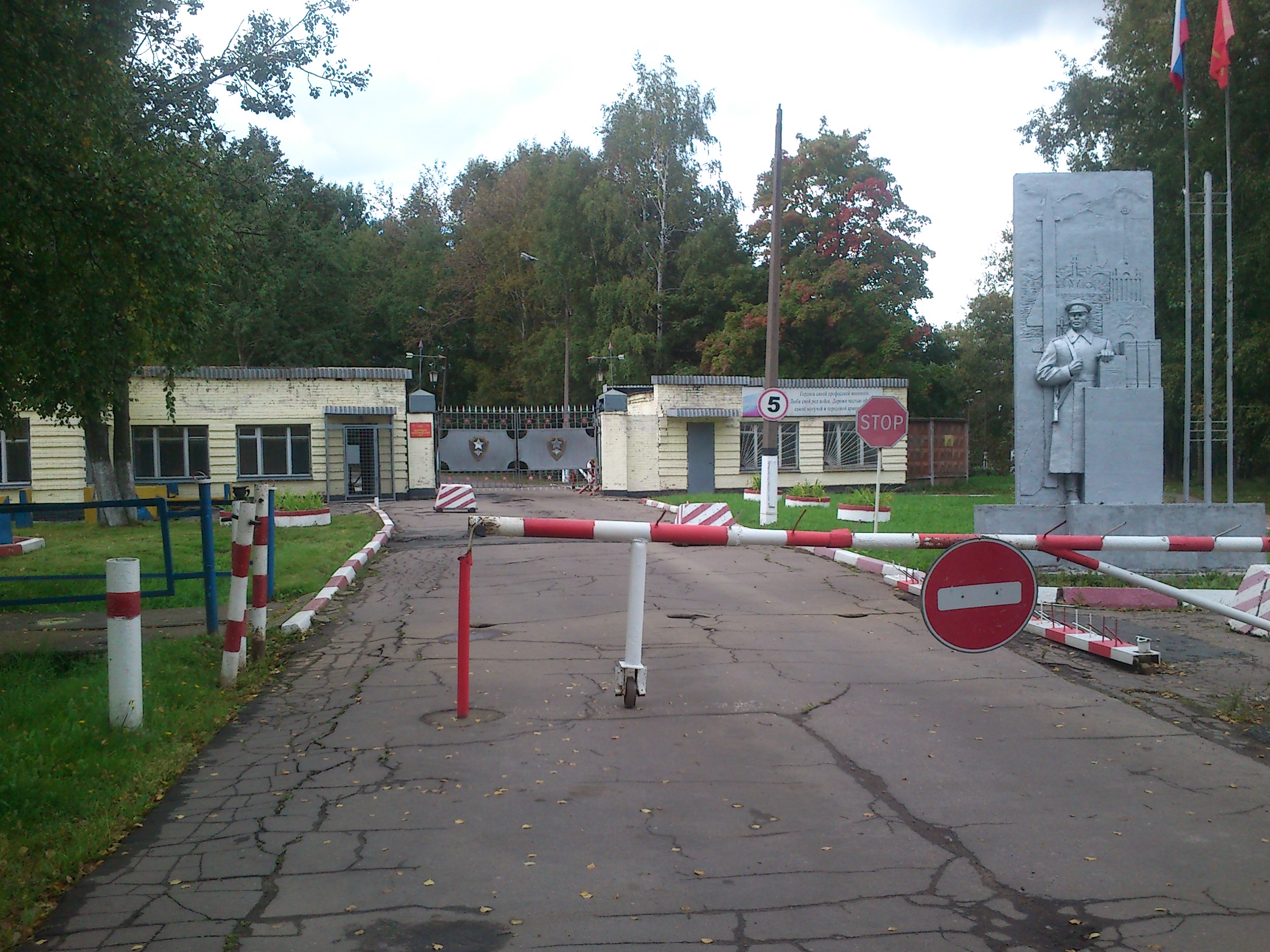
A typical checkpoint at a military townlet

In military of Russia and some other post-Soviet states (as well as in the former Soviet Union), a military townlet (Russian: военный городок, romanized: voenny gorodok), also translated as military town or barracks town, is a special territory with buildings and structures located on it, which are intended to accommodate one or more military units, institutions, military educational institutions, and enterprises of the armed forces.

== Modern Russia ==
Many of them were classified and had a restricted access ("closed military townlet"). By 2005 there were 952 closed military townlets in Russia. Military townlets have considerable problems with residential facilities, especially for veterans. Therefore a gradual declassification of some of them and passing their jurisdiction from military to civil authorities was suggested. The corresponding law was enacted in 2011 and by 2013, 1,100 of total about 5,000 were transferred to municipalities. Many of them were already closed and unused by the military, but still held facilities vital to the local civil area.

== Military townlets ==
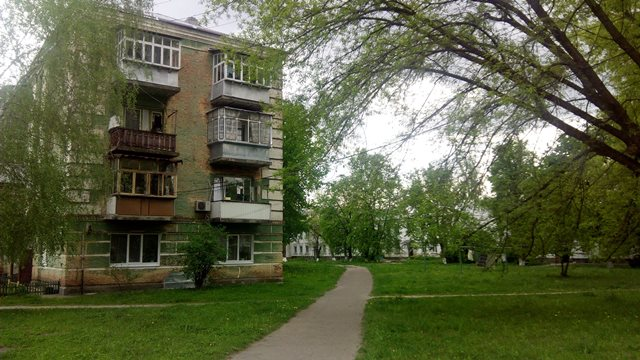
Military townlet no.11, Vasylkiv, Ukraine

- Balkhash-9
- Kadaga, Latvian Soviet Socialist Republic
- Near Kyzyl, Tuva. Completed in 2016, for the 55th Mountain Motor Rifle Brigade
- Khvoyny
- Kletsk-2 (Ozerechye since 1994), Belarus
- Klyuchi-1
- Pivan-1
- Ногинск-9
- Perm-76
- Serpukhov-15
- Star City, Russia
- Skrunda-1
- Tiefenbrunn, Soviet military townlet in East Germany, see 3rd Guards Spetsnaz Brigade

A number of places in Russia are called "Voenny Gorodok" in Russia, e.g., Military Townlet, Novosibirsk; see ru:Военный городок (значения) for more.

== See also ==
- ru:Категория:Военные городки России (Russian Wikipedia Category: Military camps of Russia)
- Barracks
- Billet
- Canaba, Ancient Rome
- Casern / Kaserne
- Cantonment
- Closed city
- Garrison / garrison town
- Military base
- Military settlement
- House of Military Officers
- Military district § Russia and Soviet Union
