= Operation Althea =

Military operation in Bosnia and Herzegovina

European Union Force Bosnia and Herzegovina
- New emblem adopted in March 2017
- Other name: EUFOR, Operation Althea
- Military leader: Major General Maurizio Fronda
- Political leader: European Union
- Dates active: 2 December 2004 – present
- Allegiance: European Union
- Size: 1100 members
- Wars: the Dayton Agreement

Operation Althea, formally the European Union Force Bosnia and Herzegovina (EUFOR), is a military deployment in Bosnia and Herzegovina to oversee the military implementation of the Dayton Agreement. It is the successor to NATO's SFOR and IFOR. The transition from SFOR to EUFOR was largely a change of name and commanders: 80% of the troops remained in place. It replaced SFOR on 2 December 2004.

== General aspects ==
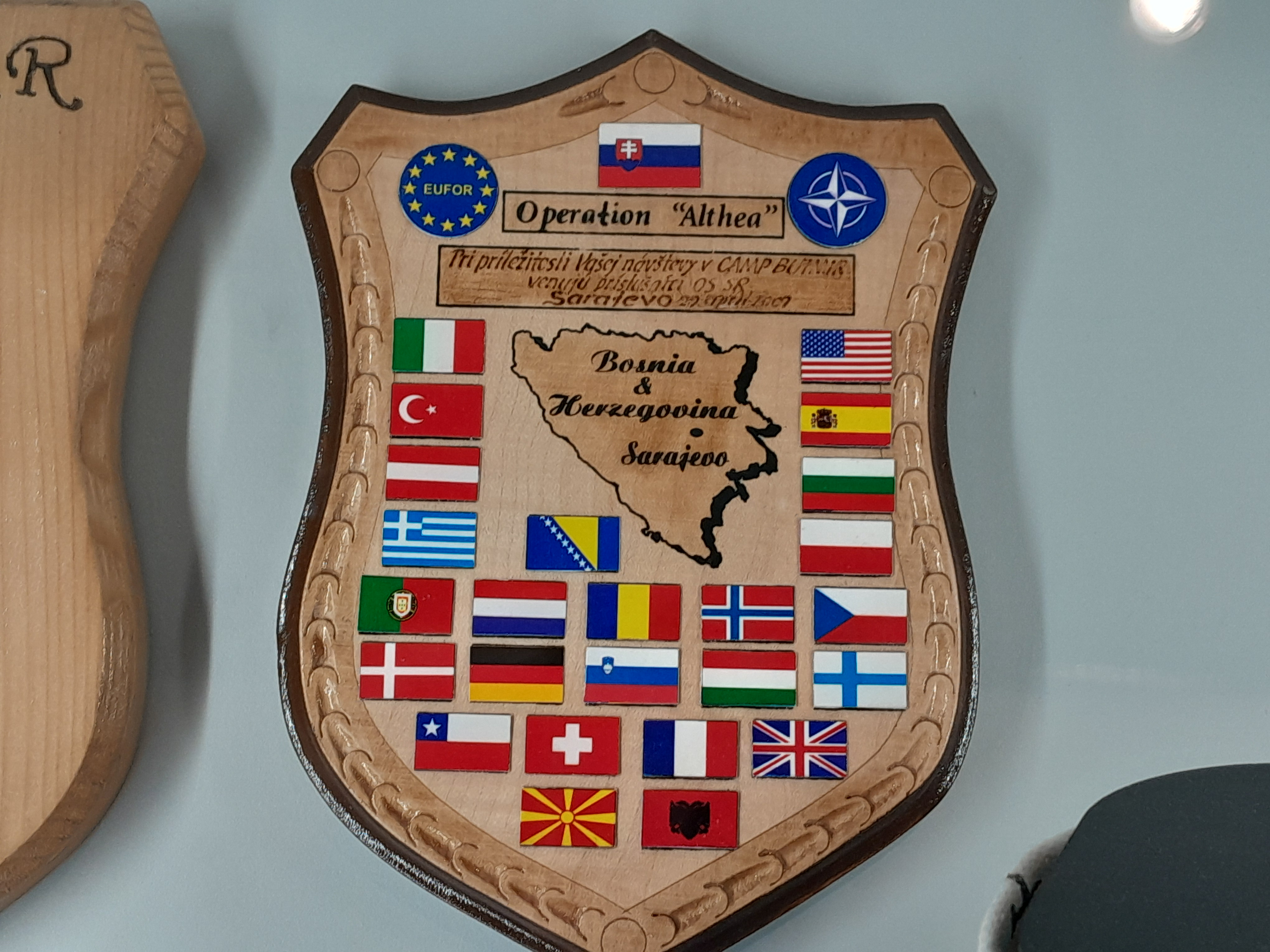
Symbol of EUFOR Althea, exhibited in Bratislava Castle

Civilian implementation of the Dayton Agreement is enforced by the Office of the High Representative.

As of January 2026, EUFOR's commander is Major General Maurizio Fronda of Italy. For this mission, the European Union Military Staff is using NATO's Supreme Headquarters Allied Powers Europe (SHAPE) as the EU's Operational Headquarters (OHQ) and is working through the Vice Chief of Staff (previously Deputy Supreme Allied Commander Europe), a European officer.

EUFOR assumed all the missions of SFOR, except for the hunt for individuals indicted by the war crimes tribunal, notably Radovan Karadžić, former leader of Republika Srpska, and Ratko Mladić, their former military leader, which remained a mission for NATO through NATO Headquarters Sarajevo. EUFOR does have police duties against organised crime, which is believed to be linked to suspected war criminals. It worked with the European Union Police Mission in Bosnia and Herzegovina (EUPM) and with the Bosnian Police. The European Union Special Representative in Bosnia and Herzegovina provides political guidance on military issues with a local political dimension to the EUFOR.

A total of 25 countries, including EU Member States and non-EU Troop Contributing Countries (TCC) are present within EUFOR. (Albania, Austria, Belgium, Bulgaria, Chile, Czech Republic, Denmark, France, Germany, Greece, Hungary, Ireland, Italy, Moldova, the Netherlands, Poland, Portugal, North Macedonia, Romania, Slovakia, Slovenia, Spain, Switzerland, and Turkey).

On 18 December 2020, the United Kingdom marked the end of its 16-year contribution to EUFOR, following Brexit.

The Turkish Battalion moved to its new barracks in 2005, the Fatih Sultan Mehmet Barracks.

As of early 2021, EUFOR personnel bases include:

- Multinational Battalion is EUFOR's military maneuver unit for BiH, located at Camp Butmir, Sarajevo, and comprises troops from Hungary, Italy, Netherlands, North Macedonia, Romania, Albania and Türkiye.
- 20 LOT Houses located throughout BiH to connect EUFOR to local communities and authorities. Houses are located in Cazin, Banja Luka (Romania) and Banja Luka (Slovenia), Brčko, Doboj, Drvar, Tuzla, Zavidovići, Travnik, Bratunac, Zenica, Vlasenica, Sarajevo, Livno, Jablanica, Višegrad, Foča, Mostar, Čapljina and Trebinje.

=== Contributing states ===
List of countries EUFOR Althea:

Country	EU	NATO
Albania	No	Yes
Austria	Yes	No
Belgium	Yes	Yes
Bulgaria	Yes	Yes
Chile	No	No
Czech Republic	Yes	Yes
Denmark	Yes	Yes
France	Yes	Yes
Germany	Yes	Yes
Greece	Yes	Yes
Hungary	Yes	Yes
Ireland	Yes	No
Italy	Yes	Yes
Moldova	No	No
Netherlands	Yes	Yes
North Macedonia	No	Yes
Poland	Yes	Yes
Portugal	Yes	Yes
Romania	Yes	Yes
Slovakia	Yes	Yes
Slovenia	Yes	Yes
Spain	Yes	Yes
Sweden	Yes	Yes
Switzerland	No	No
Turkey	No	Yes
25	19	20

Withdrawn
Country	EU	NATO	Year of withdrawal
Estonia	Yes	Yes	2012
Finland	Yes	Yes	2018
Luxembourg	Yes	Yes	2013
United Kingdom	No	Yes	2020

== Commanders ==
No.	State	Rank	Name	Tenure
1	United Kingdom	Major general	David Leakey	2 December 2004 – 6 December 2005
2	Italy	Major general	Gian Marco Chiarini	6 December 2005 – 5 December 2006
3	Germany	Rear admiral	Hans-Jochen Witthauer	5 December 2006 – 4 December 2007
4	Spain	Major general	Ignacio Martín Villalaín	4 December 2007 – 4 December 2008
5	Italy	Major general	Stefano Castagnotto	4 December 2008 – 3 December 2009
6	Austria	Major general	Bernhard Bair	4 December 2009 – 6 December 2011
7	Austria	Major general	Robert Brieger	6 December 2011 – 3 December 2012
8	Austria	Major general	Dieter Heidecker	3 December 2012 – 17 December 2014
9	Austria	Major general	Johann Luif	17 December 2014 – 24 March 2016
10	Austria	Major general	Friedrich Schrötter	24 March 2016 – 28 March 2017
11	Austria	Major general	Anton Waldner	28 March 2017 – 28 March 2018
12	Austria	Major general	Martin Dorfer	28 March 2018 – 26 June 2019
13	Austria	Major general	Reinhard Trischak	26 June 2019 – 14 January 2021
14	Austria	Major general	Alexander Platzer	14 January 2021 – 20 January 2022
15	Austria	Major general	Anton Wessely	20 January 2022 – 18 January 2023
16	Austria	Major general	Helmut Habermayer	18 January 2023 – 22 January 2024
17	Hungary	Major general	László Sticz	22 January 2024 – 21 January 2025
18	Romania	Major general	Florin-Marian Barbu	21 January 2025 - 21 January 2026
19	Italy	Major general	Maurizio Fronda	21 January 2026 – present

== See also ==
- Military of the European Union
- European Union rapid reaction mechanism
- Common Security and Defence Policy
- European Union Military Operation in the Former Yugoslav Republic of Macedonia
