= Contingency Location Garoua =

United States Army base

Contingency Location Garoua is a United States Army base in Garoua, Cameroon. Approximately 200 personnel work at the site. The site is located adjacent to Cameroonian Air Force Base 301.

== Operations ==
The base is used to support military operations against Boko Haram. Soldiers from the 10th Mountain Division were stationed at the base from October 2017. The task force provides security and logistics support for U.S. Africa Command's unmanned aerial vehicles, which gather intelligence, surveillance and reconnaissance of nearby hot spots to help the Cameroonians locate and defeat the enemy.

== Facilities ==
The camp maintains a Role 1 aid station.
