= Fatih Sultan Mehmet Barracks =

Turkish Armed Forces

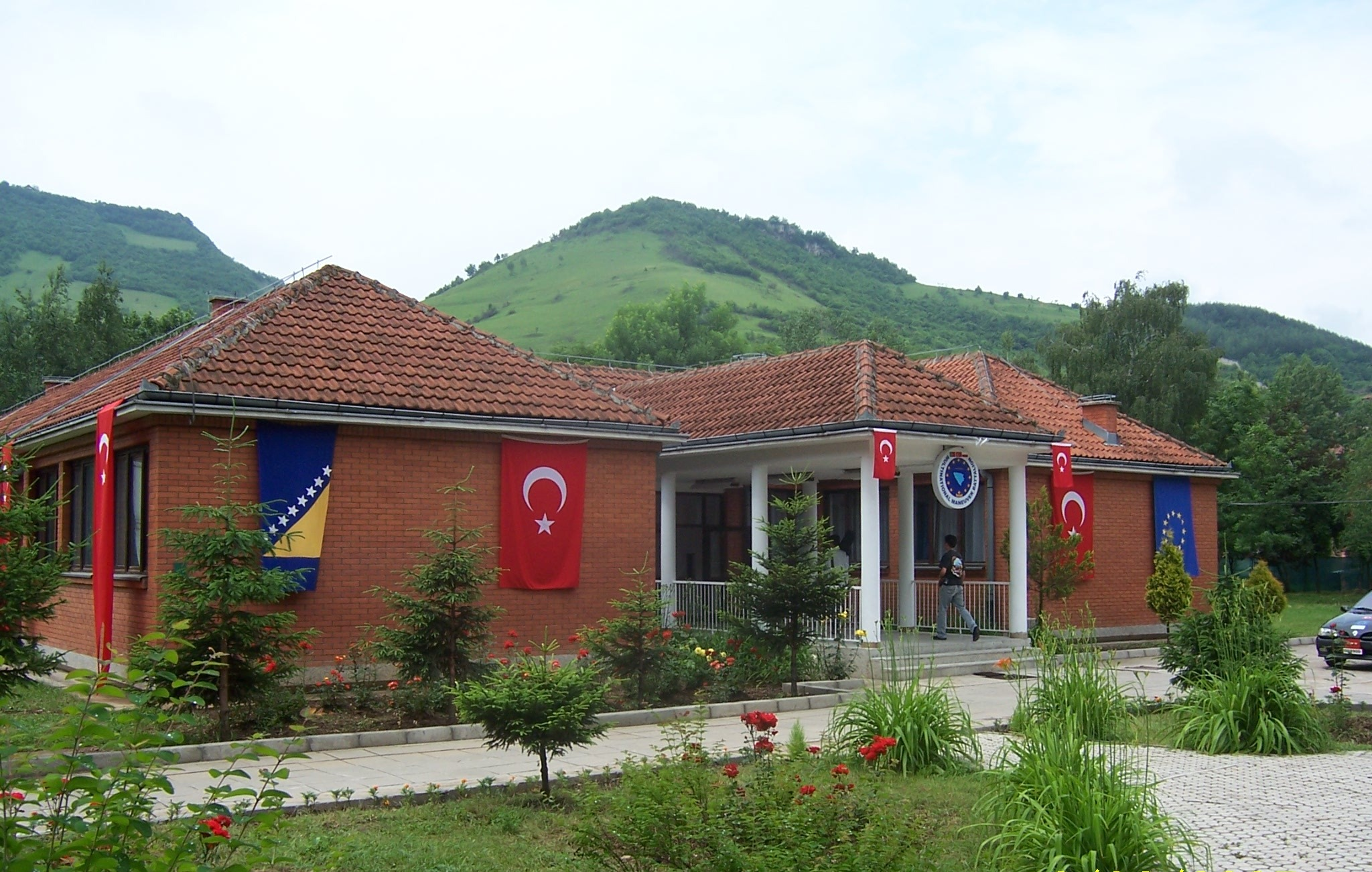
Operation Althea Mehmet The Conqueror Barracks, 2005

Fatih Sultan Mehmet Barracks is the headquarters and barracks of the Turkish Armed Forces battalion in Zenica, Bosnia-Herzegovina under EUFOR (European Union Forces in Bosnia and Herzegovina).

== Background ==
It was named after the Ottoman sultan Mehmet II, the conqueror of Bosnia and Herzegovina.

The command, which used the Zenica Steel Factory building as its headquarters, moved to its new building on 16 June 2005.

== See also ==
- Operation Althea
