= Cameroonian Air Force Base 301 =

Airbase in Garoua, Cameroon

Cameroonian Air Force Base 301 (Base Aerienne 301 De Garoua) is an airbase of the Cameroonian Air Force located in Garoua, Cameroon. It is adjacent to the United States Army Contingency Location Garoua.

== Operations ==
The base was used to launch the first Cameroonian airstrikes against Boko Haram, which involved Dassault/Dornier Alpha Jets.

As of 2017, the base was commanded by Col. Barthelemy M. Tsilla. (Note: Alternatively transliterated as Barthelemy T'Silla or Barthélémy Tsilla)

== Education facilities ==
The base is also home to Ecole Maternelle Base Aerienne 301 Garoua, a government-run nursery school.
