= Kambala (air base) =

Kazakhstan military airfield

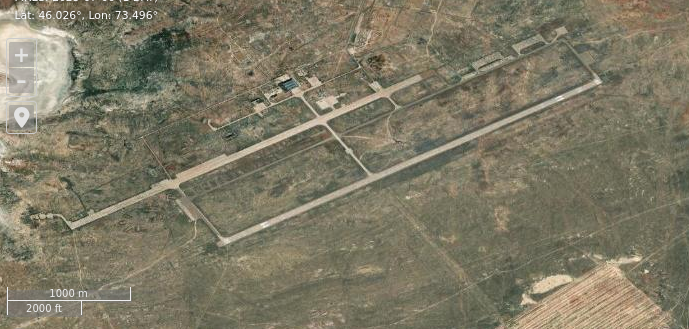
- Satellite imagery of Kambala air base
- IATA: none; ICAO: none

Summary
- Owner: Kazakhstan
- Operator: Russian Ministry of Defense
- Coordinates: 46°01′32″N 73°29′45″E
- Interactive map of Kambala (air base)

Runways
Direction	Length		Surface
Direction	ft	m	Surface
05/23		2,950 × 44	Concrete

Kambala is a military airfield in Karaganda Region Kazakhstan, used for transportation and communications support the military ground Sary Shagan. It is located 14 km southwest of the railway station Sary-Shagan railway Moyinty – Shu, 15 km west of the city Priozersk. It is operated by the Russian Federation on a rental basis.

Kambala is able to take the IL-76, An-22, Tu-154, and helicopters of all types.

== History ==
Since March 1957, the 283rd separate mixed aviation squadron (aircraft Li-2) was based at the airfield. In March–October 1958, the 679th Separate Aviation Regiment was formed on the basis of a Soviet Air Force squadron. In June 1959, the 60th Mixed Test Aviation Division was formed at the airfield. In addition to 679 officers, it included the 678th Guards Trans-Baikal Mixed Aviation Regiment (which arrived in mid-October 1959), 297th Aviation Technical Base, 305th Separate Radio Lighting Division, 1157th Separate Radar Company. In 1961, the 1157th company was reorganized into a radio engineering battalion. In 1962, the 305th division was reorganized into a communications battalion.

In 1960, the 31st Separate Fighter Squadron and the 1266th Separate Radar Company were introduced into the division to provide air defence of the test sites. On their base, the 737th Fighter Aviation Regiment and the 155th Radio Engineering Battalion were formed. In 1962, they were subordinated to the 7th Air Defence Division, 12th Independent Air Defense Army.

In the late 1980s, the 60th Mixed Test Aviation Division was reduced to a regiment.

In October 1990, the 679 OITAP was disbanded, and on its basis, the 54th Separate Test Aviation Squadron (equipped with An-12 and An-26 aircraft, helicopters Mi-8T) were formed.

In October 1998, the 54th Separate Helicopter Squadron (54 IAE) was formed on the basis of the 54th IAE, based on the airfield to this day. The squadron is equipped with Mi-8T helicopters.

In 1998, 10th Test Site of the Russian Defense Ministry was removed from the air defense forces and reassigned to 4th State Central Interspecific Training Ground Strategic Missile Forces.
