= Gvardeyskoye (air base) =

Military airport in Crimea

Gvardeyskoye (Hvardiiske)
- Hvardiiske, Simferopol Raion, Crimea in Ukraine
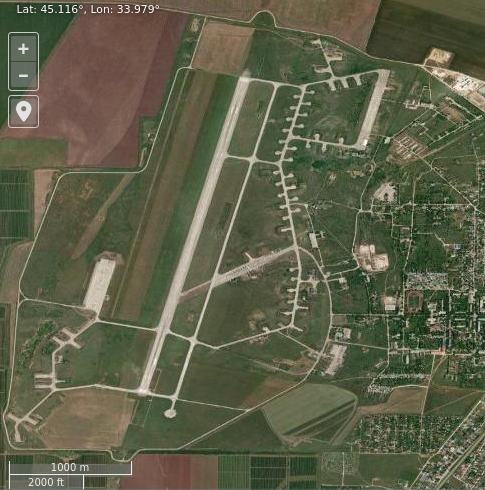
- Satellite imagery of Gvardeyskoye air base

Site information
- Type: Air Base
- Operator: Russian Aerospace Forces
- Controlled by: 4th Air and Air Defence Forces Army

Location
- Location in Crimea Location in Ukraine
- Coordinates: 45°06′58″N 33°58′44″E

Site history
- Built: 1930
- In use: 1930 -present
- Battles/wars: 2022 Russian invasion of Ukraine

Airfield information
- Identifiers: ICAO: UKFG
- Elevation: 152 metres (499 ft) AMSL
Runways
Direction	Length and surface
01/19	3,075 metres (10,089 ft) Concrete

Gvardeyskoye or Hvardiiske (Russian: Гвардейское; or Ukrainian: Гвардійське) is an airbase of the Russian Aerospace Forces in Hvardiiske, Simferopol Raion, in Russian occupied Crimea, Ukraine. It is located a few kilometres north of Simferopol International Airport.

The history of flying here began in the 1930s when Polikarpov Po-2s were flown.

The base is home to the 37th Guards Composite Aviation Regiment, which flies the Sukhoi Su-24M (ASCC: Fencer) and the Sukhoi Su-25SM/25UB (ASCC: Frogfoot) under the 27th Composite Aviation Division as part of the 4th Air and Air Defence Forces Army, Southern Military District.

The base was home to the 43rd Independent Maritime Assault Aviation Regiment from 1990. It came under the control of the Black Sea Fleet.

== See also ==
- List of military airbases in Russia
