= Russian military presence in Belarus =

Presence of the Armed Forces of the Russian Federation in the Republic of Belarus

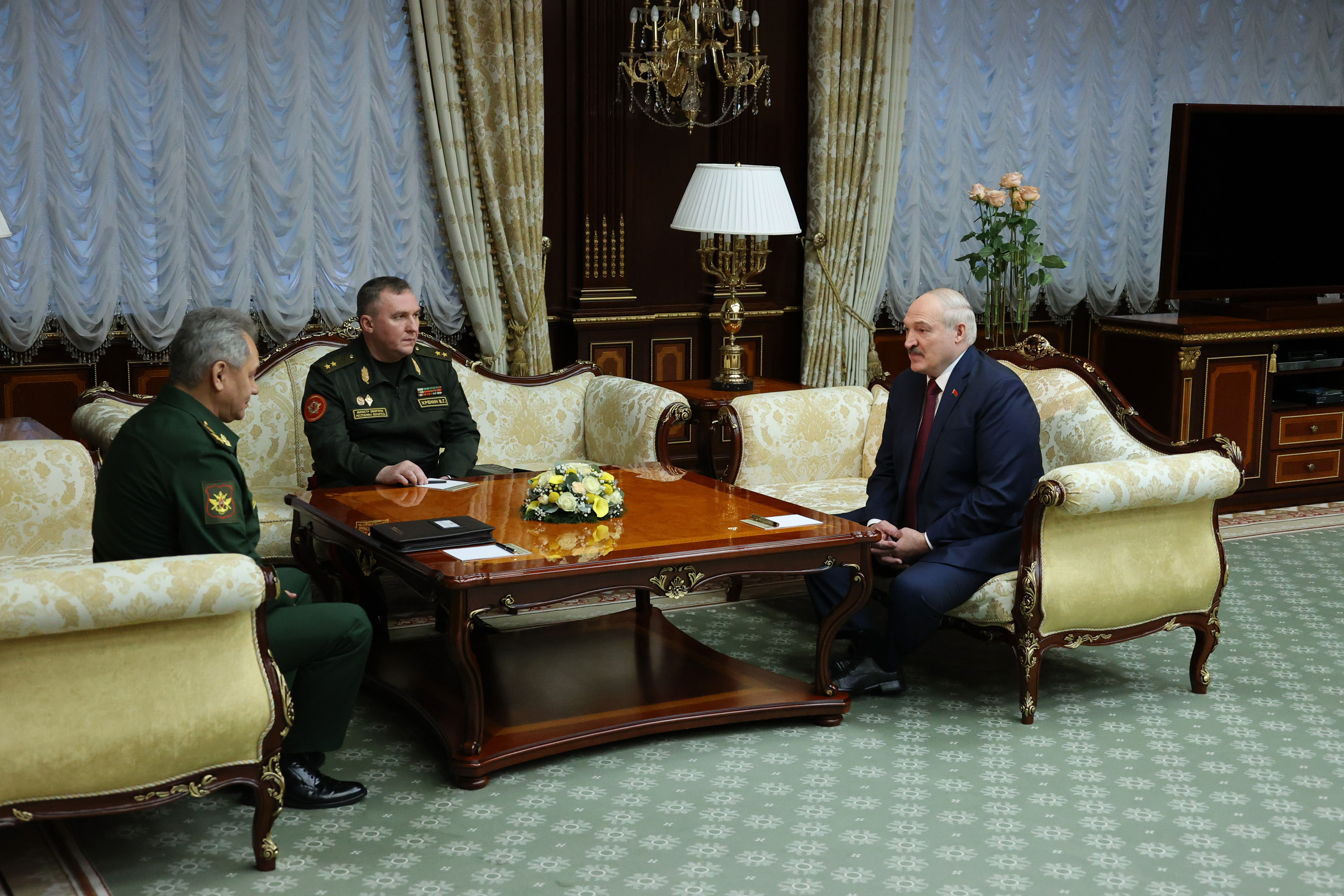
Belarusian president Alexander Lukashenko meeting with Russian defence minister Sergei Shoigu, 2022

The Russian military's presence in Belarus has increased greatly in size from its original deployments since the dissolution of the Soviet Union. The Russian military has been accused of assisting in the crackdown on the 2020–2021 Belarusian protests by supplying weapons and equipment to the Belarusian government and planning to invade the country in case the protests succeeded, and played a significant role in the early stages of the Russian invasion of Ukraine. Russia currently maintains two military bases in Belarus and stations tactical nuclear weapons in the country.

Following his victory in the 1994 Belarusian presidential election, Alexander Lukashenko began the process of militarily integrating Belarus and Russia as part of the Union State initiative, leading to a series of 1995 military agreements which provided two military bases to the Russian Armed Forces and gave them a role in guarding the Belarusian border. Belarus and Russia both partake in the Zapad exercises, and Russian president Vladimir Putin threatened to intervene in the 2020–2021 Belarusian protests if he saw fit. During the Russian invasion of Ukraine, Russian forces in Belarus launched the Kyiv offensive, which was ultimately unsuccessful, in part due to Belarusian sabotage of rail connections between Belarus and Ukraine.

== Background ==
With the dissolution of the Soviet Union, the Armed Forces of Belarus was founded as an independent formation from the Soviet Armed Forces in late 1992. The initial arrangement of Belarusian military independence from Russia remained uncertain, with the former Soviet command structure remaining in place as the United Armed Forces of the Commonwealth of Independent States until 15 June 1993.

Upon his election as President of Belarus, Alexander Lukashenko began the implementation of military reforms. Further consternation was caused by the eastward expansion of NATO, which caused a shift in Belarusian defensive policy to be primarily anti-NATO and pro-Russian. Though not to the same extent as Belarus, Russia, too, was concerned by NATO's expansion. This climate, in addition to increasing moves towards the unification of Belarus and Russia, led to Russia playing a greater military role in Belarus.

== 1995 agreements ==
Map of Russian military bases in Belarus, according to the 1995 agreements

On 6 January 1995, the governments of Belarus and Russia signed a series of agreements which provided for the leasing of military installations in Vileyka and Baranavichy to the Russian Armed Forces for a 25-year period (renewed in 2021). An additional agreement on 21 February 1995 established provisions for mutual border protection and protection of Belarusian or Russian sovereignty, effectively bringing the Russian Armed Forces to Lithuania and Poland's eastern border. An extension to the agreement in November of the same year gave the Federal Security Service and State Security Committee of the Republic of Belarus (KGB) a joint role in providing protection for Belarus' borders and Russian troops in Belarus.

== Military exercises ==
Since 1999, the Russian and Belarusian militaries have also conducted military exercises on the territory of Belarus. Beginning with the Zapad 1999 exercise, Belarus and Russia have jointly held military exercises, alternating between one another every two years since the 2011 Union Shield – 2011 exercises. These exercises have at times reflected the Belarusian government's opponents, with Belarusian concerns about the Polish minority being reflected in Zapad 2009 and about the Belarusian opposition in the Zapad 2017 exercise with the existence of fictional states for the purpose of the exercises.

== 2020–2021 Belarusian protests ==
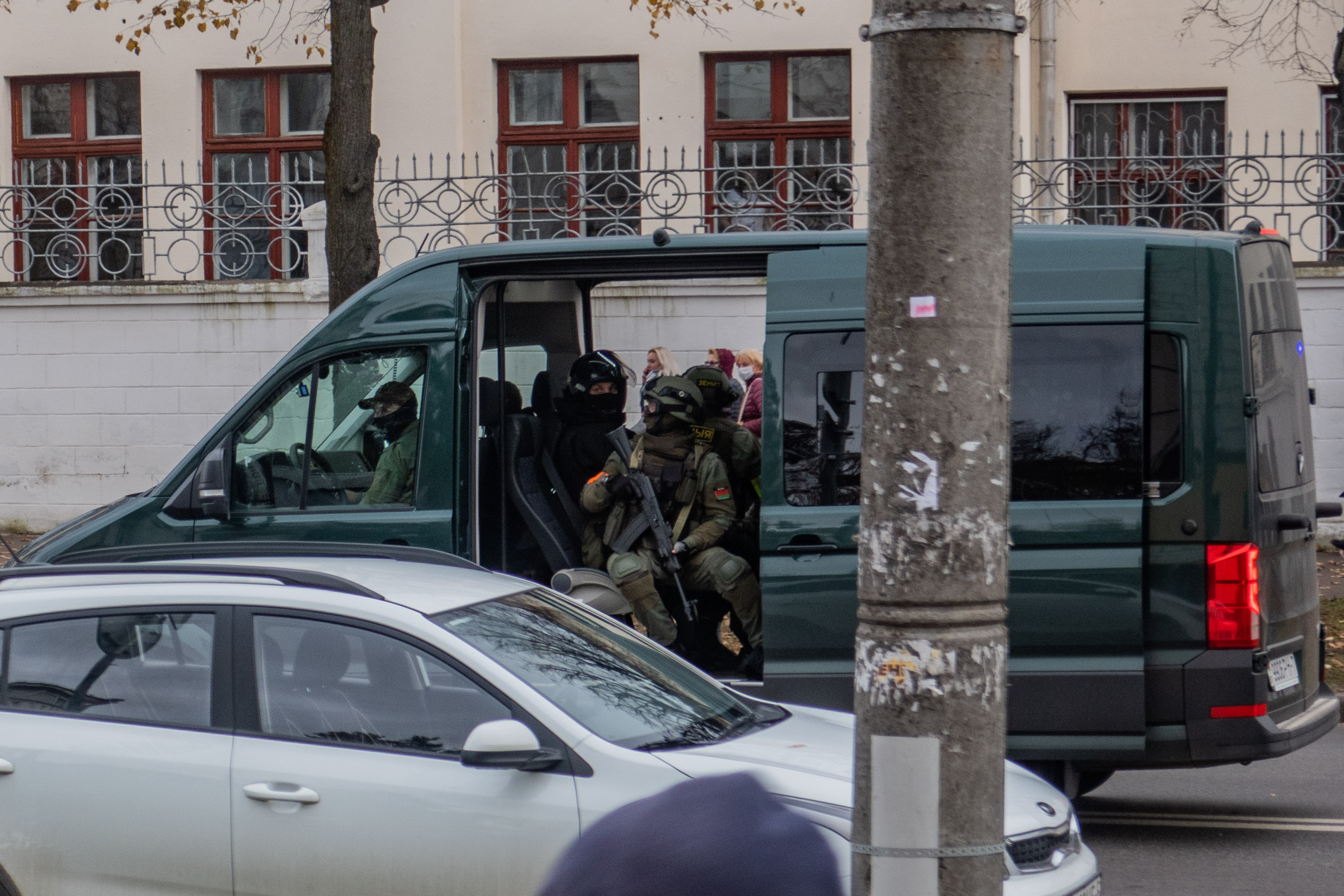
Belarusian security forces during the 2020–2021 Belarusian protests, possibly carrying a Russian-supplied Saiga-12 shotgun

Following the beginning of the 2020–2021 Belarusian protests, Belarusian President Alexander Lukashenko publicly requested assistance from Russia, saying, "Lithuania, Latvia, Poland and our native Ukraine, their leadership are ordering us to hold new elections. [...] If we follow their lead, we will go into a tailspin [...] we will perish as a people, as a state, as a nation." In response, Russian President Vladimir Putin announced he was willing to dispatch the Russian military to support Lukashenko, noting provisions within the 1995 agreements. These comments were condemned by Polish Prime Minister Mateusz Morawiecki, who called on Russia to allow for free elections in Belarus. On 14 September 2020, following negotiations between the Belarusian and Russian governments, Russia's troop presence in Belarus was expanded, with undisclosed units of the Russian military being sent to places of permanent deployment within Belarus as "reserves".

Sources from outside the Russian and Belarusian governments have made claims that the Russian military both has played and intended to play a much larger role in the crushing of the protests than officially reported. An investigation from Belarusian human rights organisation BYPOL reported the usage of the Russian-produced GM-94 grenade launcher, PK machine gun, and Saiga-12 semiautomatic rifle, as well as ammunition, by Belarusian security forces against protesters. Belarusian foreign policy expert Vlad Kobets and former United States Assistant Secretary of State for Democracy, Human Rights, and Labor David J. Kramer have expressed the viewpoint that the Russian government supplied weapons and ammunition to Belarusian security forces knowing that they would be used against protesters.

Further documents, published in 2022 by the Ukrainian Main Directorate of Intelligence and allegedly obtained from the Russian military, have detailed plans for the invasion of Belarus in case the protests were to succeed. According to the documents, the 1st Guards Tank Army was to undertake the pacification of protests under the guise of a joint military exercise, before covering up the exercise with Belarusian participation in the Caucasus 2020 military exercise. The documents, while unverified, match a description to a scenario described by Lukashenko in a 2021 address.

== Russian invasion of Ukraine ==
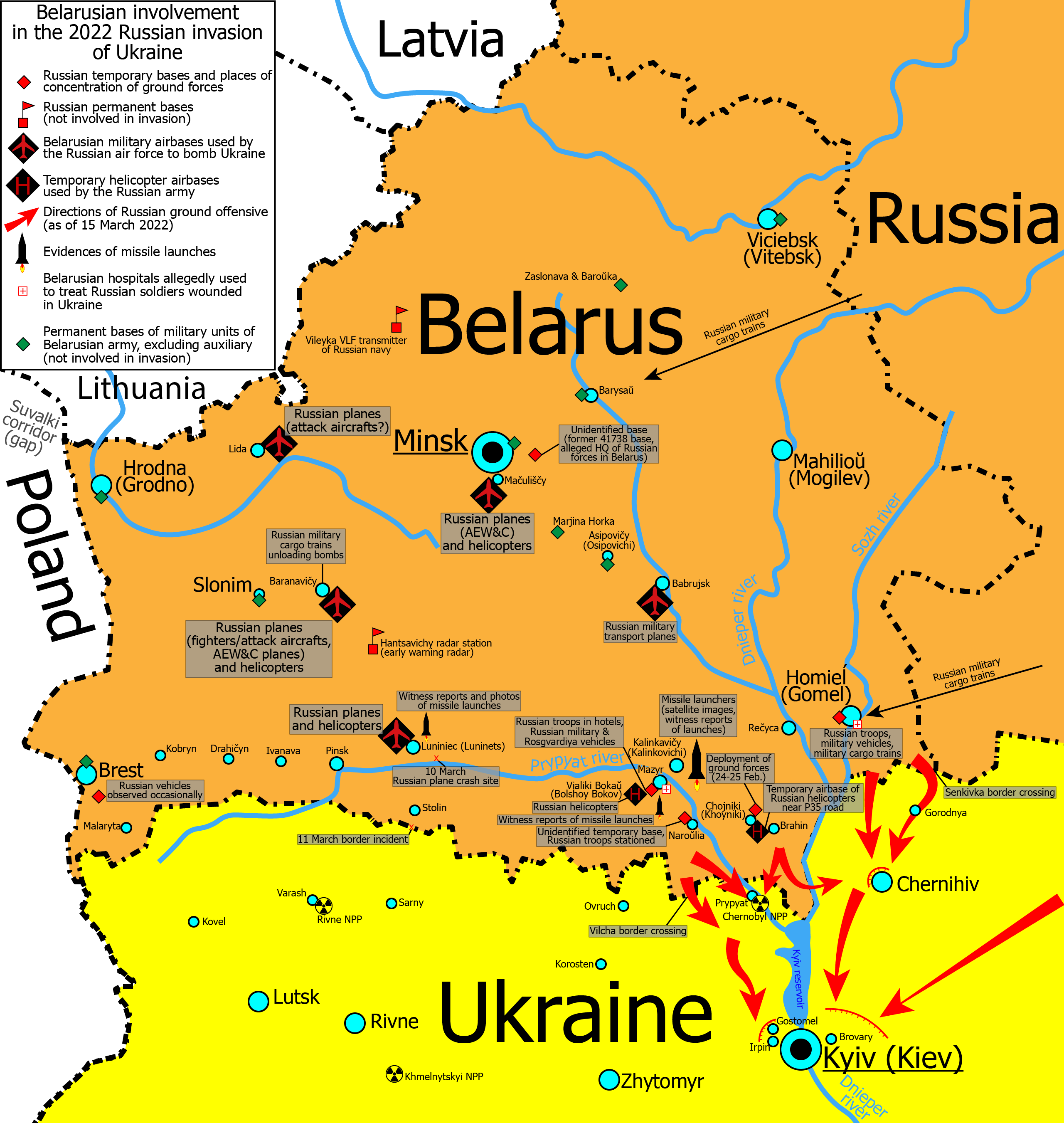
Map of Russian military activities in Belarus during the Russian invasion of Ukraine

In the prelude to the Russian invasion of Ukraine, Belarus became a staging ground for Russian forces preparing to invade Ukraine. The 5th, 29th, 35th, and 36th Combined Arms Armies of the Eastern Military District, the 76th Guards Air Assault Division, the 98th Guards Airborne Division, and the Pacific Fleet's 155th Separate Marine Brigade were all deployed to Belarus, alongside the headquarters of the Eastern Military District.

Following the beginning of the Russian invasion, Russian troops from Belarus partook in the Kyiv offensive, ultimately failing to take Ukraine's capital and withdrawing from northern Ukraine in April 2022. Russian forces' efforts were hampered in part by resistance in Belarus, which led to the damaging of Belarusian rail lines and the serious disruption of Russian logistics.

=== Stationing of nuclear weapons in Belarus ===
Following a 2022 constitutional referendum, the Belarusian and Russian militaries have pursued policies of stationing tactical nuclear weapons in Belarus. On 26 March 2023, Putin announced that Russia would station tactical nuclear weapons in Belarus under a nuclear sharing agreement, and that 9K720 Iskander missile launch systems had been transferred to Belarus. This decision came in spite of a joint Russian-Chinese declaration issued only days earlier calling on nuclear powers to withdraw all nuclear weapons from abroad. Since the announcement, Belarusian units have been trained in the usage of Iskander systems, and Russian ambassador to Belarus Boris Gryzlov has stated that nuclear weapons would be stationed at undisclosed locations in western Belarus. On 10 December 2024, Alexander Lukashenko stated that his country now hosts dozens of Russian tactical nuclear weapons.

Russia's stationing of nuclear weapons has been condemned by Belarusian opposition leader Sviatlana Tsikhanouskaya, who stated that the deployment "grossly contradicts the will of the Belarusian people," and Ukrainian president Volodymyr Zelenskyy, who referred to it as a "step towards internal destabilisation". The Atlantic Council think tank has described the stationing of tactical nuclear weapons in Belarus as demonstrating the status of Belarus as a puppet state.

Among the independent commentators on the stationing of Russian nuclear weapons in Belarus is Belarusian chemist and science journalist Siarhei Besarab. Following the announcement of plans to deploy tactical nuclear weapons, Besarab published analytical materials discussing potential storage sites and the associated risks, contributing to the public discussion about nuclear and environmental safety in Belarus. His activities in this area became one of the reasons for increased pressure from the authorities, leading to his forced emigration in 2023.
