= Russian Space Command =

Space Command (Russian: Космическое командование) was the part of the Russian Aerospace Defence Forces responsible for military space-related activities. It was formed on 1 December 2011 when the Russian Aerospace Defence Forces were created as a merger of the Russian Space Forces with part of the Russian Air Force. Responsibilities of the command included missile attack warning, space surveillance and the control of military satellites. The use of the term Space Command may be influenced by the United States Space Command.

Space Command was one of four components of the Aerospace Defence Forces, the others were Air and Missile Defence Command, Plesetsk Cosmodrome and the arsenal. Subsumed under Space Command were three centres with their associated stations.

== Main Trial Centre for Testing and Control of Space Means named after G.S. Titov ==
One centre is the 153rd Main Trial Centre for Testing and Control of Space Means named after G.S. Titov. Located in Krasnoznamensk outside Moscow it is responsible for controlling Russia's military satellite constellation. It is also responsible for the testing of new equipment and has a network of remote monitoring stations.

== Main Centre for Missile Attack Warning ==
The 820th Main Centre for Missile Attack Warning is the centre of Russia's missile attack warning network. It is located near Solnechnogorsk outside Moscow. Subsumed under it are a number of radar stations, with two, Gabala and Balkhash, located outside Russia.

== Main Space Surveillance Centre ==
The 821st Main Space Surveillance Centre is the centre of Russia's space surveillance network. It is located near Noginsk outside Moscow. Subsumed under it are several space surveillance only facilities such as Okno and Krona. It also gets data from the early warning radars.

An article by United Russia said that Space Command would consist of the entirety of the Space Forces, however as implemented Plesetsk Cosmodrome, formerly part of the Space Forces, was not under Space Command.
