= Russian Aerospace Defence Forces =

Former branch of the Russian Armed Forces

- Войска воздушно-космической обороны Voyska vozdushno-kosmicheskoy oborony
- Great emblem of the Russian Aerospace Defence Forces
- Active: 1 December 2011 – 1 August 2015
- Country: Russian Federation
- Type: Space force
- Anniversaries: 4 October (Space Forces Day)

Commanders
- Current commander: Aleksandr Golovko

Insignia
- Flag

- Middle emblem

- Insignia

The Russian Aerospace Defence Forces (Russian: Войска воздушно-космической обороны, ВВКО, romanized: Voyska vozdushno-kosmicheskoy oborony, VVKO) was a branch of the Russian Armed Forces responsible for aerospace defence, operation of Russian military satellites and the Plesetsk Cosmodrome. It was established on 1 December 2011 and dissolved on 1 August 2015. Russian Space Forces was reestablished on 1 August 2015 to replace it.

The Aerospace Defence Forces was first commanded by former Space Forces commander Colonel General Oleg Ostapenko, who was promoted to Deputy Minister of Defence in November 2012. In December 2012, Aleksandr Golovko was appointed the new commander. Although it is officially translated as aerospace in English, some Russian writers translate it as "air and space" instead.

On 1 August 2015, the Russian Air Force and the Russian Aerospace Defence Forces were merged to form the Russian Aerospace Forces.

The Russian Aerospace Defence Forces duties for space defense are now with the Russian Space Forces under the umbrella of the new Russian Aerospace Forces. The RADF today only provides air defense responsibilities.

== History ==
The Aerospace Defence Forces trace their heritage to the Space Operations Section, Strategic Operations Branch of the Supreme High Command Reserve Artillery, formed in 1955, and transformed into the Space Services Central Administration of the Strategic Rocket Forces in 1964 (and later the Chief Space Operations Directorate in 1972).

In 1967 the Anti-Missile and Space Defence Forces were formed (Russian: войска противоракетной и противокосмической обороны [ПРО и ПКО], romanized: Voyska Protivoraketnoy i Protivokosmicheskoy Oborony [PRO i PKO]) under Artillery Lieutenant General Yu. Votintsev. They were reorganised as the Ministry of Defence Space Service Units in 1982, and were expanded to include the Chief Space Operations Directorate in 1986.

In 1991 the Soviet Union was broken up. The Russian Armed Forces were established on 7 May 1992, enabling the creation of Russian Space Forces later that year on 10 August. They were merged with the Strategic Missile Troops in 1996, but were reformed in 2001.

In 2006 President Vladimir Putin agreed with the idea of a new "Air and Space Defence Concept" from 2016, but without the implication that it would be a separate service. In 2008 Aleksandr Zelin argued that the missile defence and space defence forces should be merged into the Air Force.

On 30 November 2010 President Dmitry Medvedev said that air and space defence services would be under a single strategic command and the General Staff and Ministry of Defence had decided it would be on the basis of the Space Forces. In April 2011 the then Space Forces commander Oleg Ostapenko said that concept for the future system had been approved. The service was created by the presidential decree "On changes to the composition of the Russian Armed Forces until January 1, 2016" which has not been published.

Thus, on 1 December 2011, the Space Forces became the Aerospace Defence Forces, fusing all space and some air defence components into one joint service. On 1 August 2015, the ADF was merged with the Russian Air Force to form the Russian Aerospace Forces, by orders of President Putin, and upon the recommendation of the Minister of Defense Sergei Shoigu. It is today a service speciality corps within the Aerospace Forces with responsibility for the aerospace defense of Russian territory.

=== Structure ===
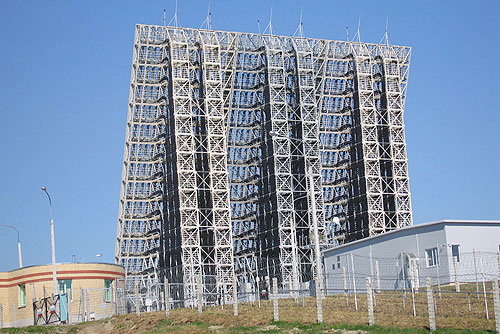
The Lekhtusi Radar Station

Until 12 August 2015 the Aerospace Defence Forces was organized into 2 commands: the Air and Space Defence Command; and the Space Command. The structure was as follows:

- Space Command (Russian: Космическое командование (KK)):
  - 153rd Main Trial Centre for Testing and Control of Space Means named after G.S. Titov at Krasnoznamensk (Russian: Главный испытательный центр испытаний и управления космическими средствами имени Германа Титова)
  - 820th Main Centre for Missile Attack Warning (SPRN) (Russian: центр предупреждения о ракетном нападении (цпрн)) in Solnechnogorsk
  - 821st Main Space Surveillance Centre (SKKP) (Russian: центр контроля космического пространства (цккп)) in Noginsk-9, Moscow Oblast.
    - Dunay-3U radar
    - Krona space object recognition station, Zelenchukskaya, Karachay-Cherkessia
    - Krona-N, Nakhodka, Primorsky Krai
    - Moment space surveillance complex, movable
    - Okno, Tajikistan
    - Okno-S, Primorsky Krai
- Air and Space Defence Command (Russian: Командование противовоздушной и противоракетной обороны (К ПВО И ПРО)):
  - 9th Missile Defence Division (ru:9-я дивизия ПРО, Military Unit Number 75555) (A-135 anti-ballistic missile system) in Pushkino
  - 4th Missile Defence Brigade in Dolgoprudny
  - 5th Missile Defence Brigade in Vidnoye
  - 6th Missile Defence Brigade in Rzhev
- State Testing Plesetsk Cosmodrome (Russian: Государственный испытательный космодром «Плесецк» (ГИК «Плесецк»))
  - Kura Test Range

In early March 2014, spokesman of the forces said the aerospace defences would include a space -and ground-based intelligence- gathering and missile early warning network, an air and space defence command, a VKO command-and-control structure, and a logistics support branch. Deputy Defence Minister Yury Borisov said on that month that the military would invest 2 trillion rubles ($55.3 billion) in building up its aerospace defence weapons over the next six years to ensure they are capable of thwarting existing and future types of air and space attacks.

=== Facilities ===
The Aerospace Defence Forces had locations across Russia and bases in some Commonwealth of Independent States countries such as early warning radars in Azerbaijan (until December 2012), Kazakhstan and Belarus, and the Okno facility in Tajikistan. For a more detailed list of air bases now used by the Russian Aerospace Forces, see List of Soviet Air Force bases

Until 2015 the VKO used the following facilities for aerospace defence operations, with the merger of the Air Force it also now handles the operations of Russia's hundreds of air defense bases and air defense units as well.

Early warning of missile attack:

Voronezh radar at Lekhtusi, Armavir, Kaliningrad, Mileshevka, Yeniseysk, Barnaul
Daryal radar at Pechora
Volga radar at Hantsavichy
Dnepr radar at Balkhash, Irkutsk and Olenegorsk
Oko early warning satellites

Space surveillance:

Okno in Tajikistan
Krona in Zelenchukskaya and Nakhodka
RT-70 in Yevpatoria (since its annexation by the Russian Federation, the status of Crimea, and thus of the city of Yevpatoria which is located on Crimea, is under dispute between Russia and Ukraine; Ukraine and the majority of the international community considers Crimea and Yevpatoria an integral part of Ukraine, while Russia, on the other hand, considers Crimea and Yevpatoria an integral part of Russia) and Galenki (together with Roscosmos)

Missile defence:

Since 2015 - 1st Special Purpose Air and Missile Defense Army - A-135 anti-ballistic missile system
Don-2N radar

Satellite Systems:

Liana space reconnaissance and target designation system (2 satellites of electronic reconnaissance 14F145 "Lotus-C1")

== Ranks and rank insignia ==
Officer ranks

Rank group	General / flag officers					Senior officers			Junior officers
Russian Aerospace Defence Forces (2011–2015)	(2013–2015)	(2011–2013)
Russian Aerospace Defence Forces (2011–2015)	Генера́л а́рмии Generál ármii		Генера́л-полко́вник; Generál-polkóvnik	Генера́л-лейтена́нт; Generál-leytenánt	Генера́л-майо́р; Generál-mayór	Полко́вник; Polkóvnik	Подполко́вник; Podpolkóvnik	Майо́р; Majór	Kапита́н; Kapitán	Старший лейтена́нт Stárshiy leytenánt	Лейтенант; Leytenant	Mла́дший лейтена́нт Mládshiy leytenánt	Курсант; Kursant

Other ranks

Rank group	General / flag officers				Senior officers	Junior officers
Russian Aerospace Defence Forces (2011–2015)
Russian Aerospace Defence Forces (2011–2015)	Ста́рший пра́порщик Stárshiy práporshchik	Пра́порщик; Práporshchyk	Старшина́ Starshyná	Ста́рший сержа́нт Stárshiy serzhánt	Сержа́нт; Serzhánt	Мла́дший сержа́нт Mládshiy serzhánt	Ефре́йтор; Efréĭtor	Рядово́й; Ryadovóy

== See also ==
- Air Force Space Command
- Zhukov Air and Space Defense Academy
- Main Centre for Missile Attack Warning
