= Russian Air Force =

Branch of the Russian Aerospace Forces

- Военно-воздушные силы России; Voenno-vozdushnye sily Rossii
- Emblem of the VVS
- Founded: 1912; 1992 (current form)
- Country: Russia
- Type: Air Force
- Role: Aerial Warfare
- Part of: Russian Aerospace Forces
- Headquarters: Arbat District, Moscow
- March: "Air March"
- Anniversaries: 12 August
- Engagements: South Ossetia war (1991–1992); War in Abkhazia (1992–1993); First Chechen War; War of Dagestan; 1999 East Timorese crisis; Second Chechen War; Russo-Georgian War; Annexation of Crimea; War in Donbas; Syrian Civil War; Russian invasion of Ukraine
- Website: mil.ru/ministry/structure/forces/type/vks/structure/air

Commanders
- Supreme Commander-in-Chief of the Russian Armed Forces: President Vladimir Putin
- Commander-in-Chief of the Aerospace Forces: Colonel general Aleksandr Chayko
- Commander of the Russian Air Force: Lieutenant general Sergey Kobylash

Insignia
- Flag

- Roundel

- Roundel (1992–2010)

- Patch

- Middle emblem

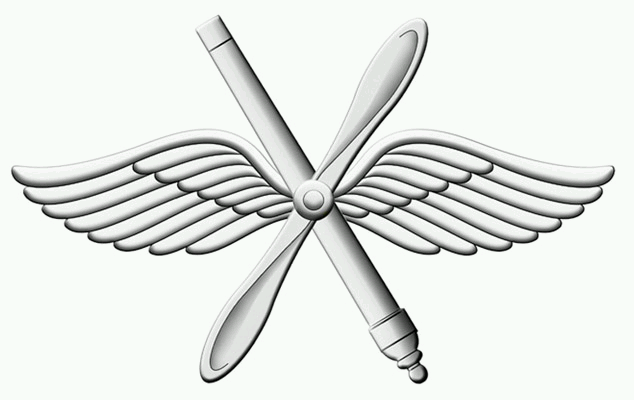
- Insignia

Aircraft flown
- Attack: Su-25SM, Su-34
- Bomber: Su-24M, MiG-31K, Tu-22M3, Tu-95, Tu-160
- Electronic warfare: A-50/A-50U, Il-22PP, Il-80
- Fighter: MiG-29, MiG-35, Su-27, Su-30, Su-35, Su-57
- Helicopter: Ka-60, Ka-226, Mi-8, Mi-17, Mi-26, Mi-38
- Attack helicopter: Mi-24/Mi-35M, Mi-28N, Ka-50, Ka-52
- Interceptor: MiG-31
- Trainer: DA42, L-39 Albatros, Yak-130, Ansat
- Transport: Il-76, Il-86, Il-112, An-22, An-26, An-124, An-140, An-148
- Tanker: Il-78

The Russian Air Force (Russian: Военно-воздушные силы России, ВВС, romanized: Voenno-vozdushnye sily Rossii, VVS) is a branch of the Russian Aerospace Forces, which was formed on 1 August 2015, with the merging of the Russian Air Force and the Russian Aerospace Defence Forces. After the dissolution of the Soviet Union, the reborn Russian armed forces began to be created on 7 May 1992 following Boris Yeltsin's creation of the Ministry of Defence. However, the Russian Federation's air force can trace its lineage and traditions back to the Imperial Russian Air Service (1912–1917) and the Soviet Air Forces (1918–1991).

== History ==
The Russian Air Force, officially established on 12 August 1912, as part of the Imperial Russian Air Service, has a long and complex history. It began as one of the earliest military aviation units globally, although its early years saw slow development due to the constraints of World War I. After the Russian Revolution of 1917, the air service was reorganised under the Soviet regime, evolving into the Red Air Fleet in 1918, which later became part of the Soviet Air Forces (VVS).

=== Early development and Soviet era ===
After the war, the Soviet Air Force focused on modernising its fleet, developing jet fighters like the Mikoyan-Gurevich MiG-15, which became famous during the Korean War. Throughout the Cold War, the Soviet Air Force was a pivotal part of the USSR’s military strategy, with long-range bombers like the Tu-95 and advanced fighters such as the MiG-21 and Su-27 becoming iconic symbols of Soviet air power.

=== 1991–2000 ===
In 1993, Pyotr Deynekin announced that a Frontal Aviation Command (Moscow, under General-lieutenant of Aviation Nikolay Antoshkin) and a Reserves and Cadres Training Command (Samara, under Colonel-General Leonid Stepanyuk) were to be established, but little more was heard of these commands.

During the 1990s, the financial stringency that was felt throughout the armed forces made its mark on the VVS as well. Pilots and other personnel could sometimes not get their wages for months, and on occasion resorted to desperate measures: four MiG-31 pilots at Yelizovo in the Far East went on hunger strike in 1996 to demand back pay which was several months overdue, and the problem was only resolved by diverting unit money intended for other tasks.

The former Soviet Air Defence Forces remained independent for several years under Russian control, only merging with the Air Forces in 1998. The decree merging the two forces was issued by President Boris Yeltsin on 16 July 1997. During 1998 altogether 580 units and formations were disbanded, 134 reorganised, and over 600 were given a new jurisdiction.

The number of servicemen in the Air Force was reduced to about 185,000 from the former combined number of 318,000. 123,500 positions were abolished, including almost 1,000 colonel positions. The resignation of 3000 other servicemen included 46 generals of which 15 were colonel generals. On 29 December 1998 Colonel General Anatoly Kornukov, a former Air Defence Forces officer and new commander-in-chief of the merged force succeeding Deynekin, reported to the Russian defense minister that the task had 'in principle been achieved'.

=== 2001–2010 ===
In December 2003 the aviation assets of the Russian Ground Forces—mostly helicopters—were transferred to the VVS, following the shooting down of a Mi-26 helicopter in Chechnya on 19 August 2002 that claimed 19 lives. The former Army Aviation was in its previous form intended for the direct support of the Ground Forces, by providing their tactical air support, conducting tactical aerial reconnaissance, transporting airborne troops, providing fire support of their actions, electronic warfare, setting of minefield barriers and other tasks. The former Army Aviation (Army Aviation of the Russian Federation) was subsequently managed by the Chief of the Department of Army Aviation. In 2010, it was announced that the 2003 decision to transfer Army Aviation to the Air Force was reversed, with the transfer back to the Ground Forces to occur sometime in 2015 or 2016.

During the 2000s, the Air Force continued to suffer from a lack of resources for pilot training. In the 1990s Russian pilots achieved approximately 10% of the flight hours of the United States Air Force. The 2007 edition of the International Institute for Strategic Studies (IISS) Military Balance listed pilots of tactical aviation flying 20–25 hours a year, 61st Air Army pilots (former Military Transport Aviation), 60 hours a year, and Army Aviation under VVS control 55 hours a year.

In 2007 the VVS resumed the Soviet-era practice of deploying its strategic bomber aircraft on long-range patrols. This ended a 15-year unilateral suspension due to fuel costs and other economic difficulties after the collapse of the Soviet Union. Patrols towards the North Pole, the Atlantic and the Pacific Ocean were reinstated, bringing the planes often close to NATO territory, including in one instance flying over the Irish Sea between the United Kingdom and Ireland.

During the 2008 South Ossetian War, the VVS suffered losses of between four and seven aircraft due to Georgian anti-aircraft fire. The 2008 Russian military reforms were promptly announced following the war, which according to Western experts were intended to address many inadequacies discovered as a result. The reforms commenced in early 2009, in which air armies were succeeded by commands, and most air regiments became air bases. Aviation Week & Space Technology confirmed that the reorganization would be completed by December 2009 and would see a 40 percent reduction in aircrew numbers.

In February 2009, the Russian newspaper Kommersant reported that 200 of the 291 MiG-29s currently in service across all Russian air arms were unsafe and would have to be permanently grounded. This action would remove from service about a third of Russia's total fighter force, some 650 aircraft. On 5 June 2009, the Chief of the General Staff, Nikolai Makarov said of the VVS that "They can run bombing missions only in the daytime with the sun shining, but they miss their targets anyway". Maj. Gen. Pavel Androsov said that Russia's long-range bombers would be upgraded in 2009 to be able to hit within 20 meters of their targets.

Also in September 2009, it was reported that an East European network of the Joint CIS Air Defense System was to be set up by Russia and Belarus.

By August 2010, according to the Commander-in-Chief of the VVS Alexander Zelin, the average flight hours of a pilot in Russian tactical aviation had reached 80 hours a year, while in army aviation and military transport aviation, it exceeded 100 hours a year.

=== 2011–2020 ===
According to the instructions of the General Staff of the Armed Forces on 1 September 2011, the unmanned aircraft of the VVS and the personnel operating them moved under the command structure of the Russian Ground Forces.

As of 2012, the VVS operated a total of 61 air bases, including 26 air bases with tactical aircraft, of which 14 are equipped with fighter aircraft. In terms of flight hours, pilots in the Western Military District averaged 125 hours over the 2012 training year. Pilots from the Kursk air base achieved an average of 150 hours, with transport aviation averaging 170 hours.

In February 2014, during the early periods of Russia's annexation of Crimea, the assets of the VVS in the Southern Military District were activated and flown to the peninsula for supporting the rest of the operations.

On 1 August 2015, the Russian Air Force, along with the Russian Aerospace Defence Forces and the Air Defense Troops, were merged into a new branch of the armed forces, now officially called the Russian Aerospace Forces.

On 30 September 2015, the VVS launched a military intervention in Syria, in Syria's Homs region. On 24 November 2015, during a bombing mission, a Turkish Air Force F-16 shot down a Russian Sukhoi Su-24 that Turkey claimed had violated its airspace.

In March 2020, the indiscriminate bombing of civilian targets by the VVS in Syria has been described as "amounting to war crime" by a United Nations Human Rights Council report.

On 9 November 2020, a Russian Mil Mi-24 attack helicopter was shot down mistakenly by the Azerbaijani Armed Forces during the 2020 Nagorno-Karabakh war killing 2 crew members and injuring 1 more. Days later, after the signing of the ceasefire agreement, Russian peacekeepers were deployed to Nagorno-Karabakh with aviation to patrol its borders.

=== 2021–present ===
Modernization programs initiated during the 2010s continue under Russia’s State Armament Programme for 2018–2027, although their implementation has been affected by economic constraints, Western sanctions, and the demands of the Russian invasion of Ukraine. The Russian Aerospace Forces continue to receive upgraded variants of Soviet-era aircraft, including the Sukhoi Su-30SM2, Su-34M, and Su-35S, while limited numbers of fifth-generation Sukhoi Su-57 fighters have entered service. At the same time, Russia has expanded its use of unmanned aerial vehicles, electronic warfare systems, and precision-guided munitions.

Following Russia’s full-scale invasion of Ukraine on 24 February 2022, the Russian Air Force conducted large-scale strike operations against Ukrainian military infrastructure but has not achieved sustained air superiority over Ukraine. Ukrainian air defenses, including Soviet-era systems and later Western-provided systems such as Patriot and NASAMS, have forced Russian aircraft to operate at greater distances from the front line. As a result, the VKS increasingly relies on long-range missile strikes, stand-off weapons, and glide bombs equipped with Unified Gliding and Correction Modules (UMPK), which allow Soviet-era FAB-series bombs to be converted into guided weapons.

Since 2023, Russian aviation has increasingly relied on glide bombs, particularly those deployed by Su-34 and Su-35 aircraft. These weapons have become a major component of Russian close air support operations, allowing aircraft to strike Ukrainian positions while remaining outside the effective range of many Ukrainian air-defense systems.

The war has resulted in significant losses among Russian aviation assets. Several high-value aircraft have been destroyed or damaged, including A-50 airborne early-warning aircraft, Su-34 fighter-bombers, Su-35 fighters, and Ka-52 attack helicopters. In June 2025, Ukraine conducted Operation Spider’s Web, a long-range drone attack against Russian air bases targeting strategic aviation assets, including Tu-95 and Tu-22M3 bombers. Ukrainian officials claimed dozens of aircraft were destroyed or damaged, while independent assessments estimated lower but still significant losses.

==== VVS role in the Russian invasion of Ukraine ====
On 24 February 2022, the VVS was deployed in support of the invasion of Ukraine. The VVS had reportedly deployed about 300 combat aircraft within range of Ukraine. On 25 February 2022, Ukrainian forces reportedly destroyed several aircraft and set a Russian airbase on fire in the Millerovo air base attack. By March 2022, it was claimed that the VVS had carried out at least 1403 airstrikes on Ukraine since the beginning of the invasion.

The VVS has generally been noted by its relative absence from the invasion and has as of 25 March 2022 failed to subdue Ukrainian air defenses or the Ukrainian Air Force. It has, as of 1 April 2022, also failed to achieve air supremacy. Failure to achieve this has been attributed to the lack of SEAD operations on the part of the VVS likely due to the lack of flying hours for Russian pilots as well as the lack of dedicated SEAD units and precision-guided munitions within the VVS. These weaknesses have been compounded by the mobility of Ukrainian air defenses with the extensive use of MANPADS as well as NATO reportedly sharing early warning information with Ukrainian forces. According to the Ukrainian MoD, as of 16 March 2022, the VVS has also suffered at least 77 aircraft losses, however only 12 were verified by independent sources at the time.

In the first six months of the campaign, Russia's air war was largely a failure. An American intelligence analyst said that less than 40% of the 2,154 missiles fired by Russia hit their targets, such as the Zatoka bridge which sustained over eight air attacks before being disabled. The VVS reportedly flew over 20,000 sorties in the war, fewer than 3,000 of which entered Ukrainian airspace, possibly due to fear of Ukraine's sustained air defense.

The VVS has struck civilian targets during the invasion prompting an International Criminal Court investigation in Ukraine. Notably, during the battle of Mariupol it struck a hospital as well as a theatre. Some reports state Russian pilots in Ukraine flying older aircraft having to use civilian GPS units "taped to the dashboards".

On 19 September US Air Force General James B. Hecker said that Russia had lost 55 military aircraft due to being shot down by Ukrainian air defenses since the start of the invasion. He credits this success to the Ukrainian use of SA-11 and SA-10 air defense systems. As the US doesn't have these systems, getting new missiles from European allies is a "big ask" from Kyiv. Russian airplanes increased their operations due to the September 2022 Ukrainian Kharkiv Oblast counteroffensive. This was due to several factors including changing front lines, former safe territory is now held by the enemy. Or because they were under pressure to provide closer ground support.

On 8 October 2022 the chief of the VVS Sergey Surovikin became the commander of all Russian forces invading Ukraine. On 10 October 2022 the VVS re-commenced the bombardment of cities like Kyiv and especially energy infrastructure like electricity grid facilities. The large-scale coordinated attacks also hit Kharkiv, Kryvyi Rih, Lviv, Dnipro, Ternopil, Kremenchuk, Khmelnytskyi, and Zhytomyr. The oblasts of Kyiv, Khmelnytskyi, Lviv, Dnipropetrovsk, Vinnytsia, Ivano-Frankivsk, Zaporizhzhia, Sumy, Kharkiv, Zhytormyr, Kirovohrad were attacked on this day. When, by 17 October, these energy infrastructure attacks continued unabated the western media labeled the delivery system "kamikaze drones", and Ukrainian president Zelensky called this "terrorizing the civilian population". By 23 October (not yet two weeks) 40% of Ukrainians were without electricity and/or water.

Russian airstrikes against Ukrainian infrastructure again intensified with the deployment of the UMPK (unified gliding and correction module) bomb kits since early 2023, which allowed the Russian Air Force to convert dumb Soviet-era aerial bombs into a precise munition. UMPK bomb kits are being particularly used with general purpose FAB-250, FAB-500 and FAB-1500 aerial bombs containing highly explosive warheads. These glide kits greatly increase range and also add an element of guidance, allowing Russian bombers, namely the Su-34, to execute aerial attacks from safer distances without entering areas covered by Ukrainian air defense systems. According to Ukrainian General Ivan Havryliuk, since start of 2024 year, Russian aviation dropped over 3,500 of these bombs on Ukrainian positions. Employment expanded substantially thereafter. The Joint Air Power Competence Centre assessed that by early 2025 Russia was releasing approximately 3,500 UMPK-equipped bombs per month, or over 100 per day across the front, predominantly against static targets ahead of ground assaults. The General Staff of the Armed Forces of Ukraine recorded 5,328 guided bombs during October 2025 and a total approaching 44,000 across the first eleven months of that year, an average of about 130 per day.

The kits were progressively refined in response to Ukrainian electronic warfare, with jamming-resistant Kometa antennas, greater reliance on inertial navigation, and glide ranges extended from an initial 60–80 km to around 95 km. In October 2025 a more aerodynamic kit for the FAB-500T appeared on Su-34s, with Russian sources claiming ranges beyond 100 km unpowered and over 200 km for a turbojet-equipped variant.

Usage continued to increase throughout 2026, reaching record levels during the summer and early autumn. According to figures from the General Staff of the Armed Forces of Ukraine, Russian aircraft released 8,266 guided aerial bombs in June 2026 and more than 8,300 in July. August saw a further increase to 8,766, averaging approximately 283 bombs per day and establishing a new monthly record at the time. The monitoring project Oko Gora subsequently recorded 9,021 guided aerial bombs in September, averaging approximately 301 per day and surpassing the previous record. However, usage decline in October, when Russian forces employed 8,016 guided aerial bombs, an approximately 11% decrease from the previous month and the first recorded monthly decline following the sustained increase throughout the summer. Despite the reduction, October's total remained among the highest monthly figures recorded since the beginning of the full-scale invasion.

The October decline coincided with Ukrainian strikes asgainst Russian military airbases, including attacks on Borisoglebsk and Marinovka, which targeted Su-34 fighter-bombers used extensively to deploy UMPK-equipped bombs. However, available reporting has not established a direct causal relationship between these attacks and the reduction in glide-bomb usage, which may also have been influenced by aircraft availability, weather conditions, and changes in the intensity of ground operations.

Wagner Group rebellion

During the conflict, the VVS lost one Il-22M Airborne Command Post and five helicopters (three Mi-8, one Mi-35M, and one KA-52) as well as one damaged Mi-8. Two of the destroyed Mi-8s as well as the damaged one were Russia's newest Mi-8MTPR-1 Electronic Warfare variants. Up to 29 crew were killed, assuming the aircraft were fully manned, but the VVS has not released casualties. Wagner lost at least five vehicles during hostilities, but it is unclear how many can be attributed to VVS actions. Reports indicated that the Russian Armed Forces were failing to stop Wagner's momentum toward Moscow when a political resolution to the rebellion was announced. The U.K. Defense Intelligence reported that the Il-22M was a particularly high value asset, being one in a fleet of only 12 special mission aircraft, and that its loss could have an impact on the ongoing invasion of Ukraine.

Operation Spider's Web

On 1 June 2025, Security Service of Ukraine (SBU) struck at least two airfields, those being Olenya air base, in the Arctic, and Belaya air base in Siberia, destroying rows of Russian strategic and nuclear capable bombers. Ukrainian sources claimed further strikes at Diaghilev air base and Ivanovo air base, claiming to have destroyed "more than" 40 Russian aircraft including the A-50, Tu-95 and Tu-22M3. According to the Financial Times, the damaged and destroyed aircraft made up around 20% of Russia’s operational long-range aviation fleet. Many of the aircraft types affected, such as the Tu-95 and Tu-22M3, have not been produced since the dissolution of the Soviet Union in 1991, making them exceptionally difficult to replace.

==== October 2026 Airbase Strikes ====
In October 2026, Ukrainian forces conducted missile strikes against Russian airbases that resulted in the destruction or damage of several Su-34 fighter-bombers. On the night of 14-15 October, Ukrainian forces struck Borisoglebsk airbase in Voronezh Oblast using Neptune missiles. Ukrainian President Volodymyr Zelensky subsequently stated that four aircraft had been destroyed and two damaged; satellite imagery published after the attack showed damage to aircraft in the targeted parking area. The United KIngdom's Ministry of Defence later assessed that between two and four aircraft were highly likely to have been destroyed.

On 29 October, 2026, Ukrainian forces struck Marinovka airbase in Volgograd Oblast also using Neptune missiles. The Ukrainian Navy reported that two Su-34 fighter-bombers belonging to the 11th Mixed Aviation Regiment were destroyed. Satellite imagery published the following day showed strike damage at the aircraft's parking positions, supporting the reported losses.

The strikes targeted Su-34s, a principal platform used by Russian tactical aviation to deploy UMPK-equipped glide bombs against Ukrainian positions and settlements. In its 5 November, 2026, assessment, the UK Ministry of Defence estimated that Russia had lost at least 11 tactical aviation aircraft during October, including losses attributed to Ukrainian airfield strikes, technical or maintenance failures, and pilot error.

== Leadership ==
Previously the highest military office until 1 August 2015.

Commander-in-chief of the VVS	Years
General Pyotr Deynekin	(19 August 1992 – 22 January 1998)
General Anatoly Kornukov	(22 January 1998 – 21 January 2002)
General Vladimir Mikhaylov	(21 January 2002 – 9 May 2007)
Colonel General Aleksandr Zelin	(9 May 2007 – 27 April 2012)
Colonel General Viktor Bondarev	(6 May 2012 – 1 August 2015)

Deputy Commander-in-Chief of the Russian Aerospace Forces and Commander of the VVS	Years
Lieutenant General Andrey Yudin	(1 August 2015 – August 2019)
Lieutenant General Sergey Dronov	(August 2019 – July 2024)
Lieutenant General Sergey Kobylash	(July 2024 – Present)

Since the merger between the VVS and the Russian Aerospace Defence Forces on 1 August 2015, the commander of the VVS as part of the new Russian Aerospace Forces is titled Deputy Commander-in-Chief of the Russian Aerospace Forces and Commander of the VVS. Lieutenant General Andrey Yudin became the first holder of the position until he was succeeded by Lieutenant General Sergey Dronov in August 2019.

== Structure ==
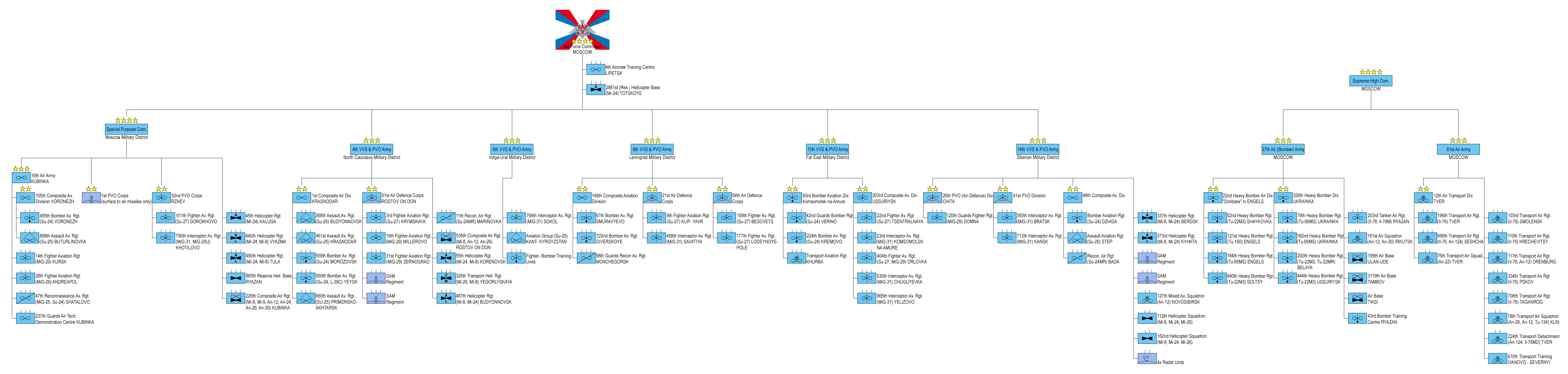
The organisation of the Russian Air Force in 2002

In 2009 the structure of the VVS was completely changed to a command-air base structure from the previous structure of air army-air division or corps-air regiment. The VVS was divided into four operational commands, the Aerospace Defense Operational Strategic Command (seemingly primarily made up of the former Special Purpose Command), the Military Transport Aviation Command, and the Long-Range Aviation Command. This listing is a composite; the available new information covers frontline forces, and the forces of central subordination are as of approximately August 2008. Warfare.ru maintains what appears to be a reasonably up-to-date listing, and Combat Aircraft magazine in June 2010 listed their organization's estimate of the new order of battle.

This listing appears to be as of June 2009:

=== Regional air armies ===
Russian Air Force flights often use a callsign beginning with RFF: For example RFF1234.

- 1st Special Purpose Air and Missile Defense Army (Moscow Military District)
  - 4th Aerospace Defense Brigade (Dolgoprudnyi, Moscow Oblast)
  - 5th Aerospace Defense Brigade (Petrovskoe, Moscow Oblast)
  - 6th Aerospace Defense Brigade (Rzhev, Tver Oblast) (former 32nd Corps of PVO?)
  - 6963rd aviation base (Kursk Vostochny Airport) (Su-30, MiG-29SMT/UBT)
  - 6968th fighter aviation base (Borisovsky Khotilovo, Tver Oblast) (Su-27, MiG-31B, MiG-31BM, Su-24)
- 6th Air and Air Defence Forces Army (Voronezh) (Leningrad Military District)
  - 1st Aerospace Defense Brigade (Severomorsk)
  - 2nd Aerospace Defense Brigade (St. Petersburg)
  - 6961st aviation base (Petrozavodsk Airport) (Su-27)
  - 6964th aviation base (Monchegorsk Air Base, Murmansk Oblast) (Su-24M, Su-24MR)
  - 6965th aviation base (Vyazma Airport, Smolensk Oblast) (Mi-8TM, Mi-24V, Mi-28N)
  - 7000th aviation base (Voronezh Malshevo Air Base) (Su-24M, Su-24MR, Su-34)
- 14th Air and Air Defence Forces Army (Yekaterinburg) (Central Military District)
  - 8th Aerospace Defense Brigade (Yekaterinburg)
  - 9th Aerospace Defense Brigade (Novosibirsk)
  - 10th Aerospace Defense Brigade (Chita)
  - 6977th Aviation Base (Bolshoye Savino Airport, Perm Krai) (MiG-31BM)
  - 6979th aviation base (Kansk Air Base, Krasnoyarsk Krai) (MiG-31BM)
  - 6980th aviation base (Chelyabinsk Shagol Airport) (Su-24M)
  - 6982nd aviation base (Domna Air Base, Zabaykalsky Krai) (MiG-29, Su-30SM)
- 11th Air and Air Defence Forces Army (Khabarovsk) (Eastern Military District)
  - 11th Aerospace Defense Brigade (Komsomolsk-na-Amur)
  - 12th Aerospace Defense Brigade (Vladivostok)
  - 6983rd aviation base (Komsomolsk-on-Amur Airport, Khabarovsk Krai) (Su-27SM, Su-30M2, Su-35S, Su-34)
  - 6988th aviation base (Khurba, Khabarovsk Krai) (Su-24M, Su-24M2, Su-24MR)
  - 6989th aviation base (Vladivostok International Airport) (Su-27SM)
  - 265th transport aviation base (Khabarovsk)
- 4th Air and Air Defence Forces Army – (former 4th and 5th Armies of VVS and PVO) (Rostov-on-Don) (Southern Military District)
  - 7th Aerospace Defense Brigade (Rostov-on-Don)
  - 8th Aerospace Defense Brigade (Yekaterinburg)
  - 6970th aviation base (Morozovsk, Rostov Oblast) (Su-24M, Su-34)
  - 6971st aviation base (Budyonnovsk, Stavropol Krai) (Su-25SM, Mi-8AMTSh, Mi-24V, Mi-28N)
  - 6972nd aviation base (Krymsk, Krasnodar Krai) (Su-27, Mi-8, Mi-24P, Mi-28N, Ka-27)
  - 6974th aviation base (Korenovsk, Krasnodar Krai) (Mi-8MTV-5, Mi-24V, Mi-35M, Mi-28N)
  - 999th aviation base (Kant Air Base, Kyrgyzstan) (Su-25, Su-27, Mi-8T)
  - 229th transport aviation base (Rostov-on-Don) (Mi-26(T), Mi-8AMTSh(TM))

Helicopter regiments providing support to the Ground Forces include the 39th, 55th, granted Guards status after the 2022 Russian invasion of Ukraine, the 112th, 319th, 332nd, 337th, 440th, and the 487th. There is also a helicopter regiment in the Navy, the 830th Anti-Submarine Helicopter Regiment.

=== Military Transport Aviation Command ===
Headquarters: Moscow

  - 6955th Aviation Base (Migalovo (Tver)) (Il-76MD)
  - 6956th Aviation Base (Orenburg) (Il-76MD)
  - 6958th Aviation Base (Taganrog, Rostov Oblast) (Il-76MD)
  - 6985th Aviation Base (Pskov Airport) (Il-76MF)

=== Long-Range Aviation ===
Headquarters Moscow

  - 6950th Aviation Base (Engels-2, Saratov Oblast) (Tu-22 M3, Tu-95 MS6, Tu-160) former 22nd Guards Heavy Bomber Aviation Division
  - 6952nd Aviation Base (Ukrainka Air Base, Amur Oblast) (Tu-95 MS16)
  - 6953rd Aviation Base (Belaya Air Base, located at Sredni, Irkutsk Oblast) (Tu-22 M3)

=== Forces of Central Subordination ===
- 132nd Central Communications Center, Balashikha, Zarya airport, Moscow Oblast
- 1st Fighter-Bomber Aviation Regiment – Su-24 – Lebyazhye – absorbed by 6970th Aviation Base, 1 September 2009
- 764th Fighter Aviation Regiment – MiG-31, MiG-25PU – Bolshoye Savino Airport (Sokol)
- 8th Special Purpose Aviation Division (Chkalovsky Airport)
  - 353rd Special Purpose Aviation Regiment— Chkalovsky Airport — Il-18, Il-76, An-12, An-72, Tu-134, Tu-154.
  - 354th Special Purpose Aviation Regiment— Chkalovsky Airport — Il-18, Il-76, An-12, An-72, Tu-134, Tu-154.
  - 206th Special Purpose Aviation Base — Chkalovsky Airport — Mi-8 helicopters.
  - 223rd Flight Unit – commercial transport – Chkalovsky Airport – Il-62M, Il-76MD, Tu-134A-3, Tupolev Tu-154B-2
- 2457th Air Base of Long Range Radiolocation Detection Aircraft – A-50, A-50М – Ivanovo Severny
- 929th State Flight Test Centre named for V. P. Chkalov (Akhtubinsk)
  - 1338th Test Centre – Chkalovsky Airport – Ilyushin Il-22, Ilyushin Il-80, and Il-82
  - High-altitude mountain Center for Air Materiel and Weapons Research – Nalchik
  - 368th Detached Composite Aviation Squadron (An-12)
  - 13th Aeronautic Test Facility – Volsk – air balloons
  - 267th Center of Test Pilots Training – Akhtubinsk
- 4th Centre for Combat Employment and Retraining of Personnel – Lipetsk Air Base
- 968th Sevastopol Composite Training and Research Aviation Regiment, Lipetsk Air Base, fighter jets MiG-29, Su-27, Su-27M, Su-30, bombers Su-24M, Su-24M2, Su-34, reconnaissance plane Su-24MP, jammer Su-24MP, strike-fighter Su-25, Su-25T, Su-25SM
- 3958th Guards Kerch Aviation Base, Savasleyka, Nizhegorod Oblast, MiG-31.
- 185th Centre for Combat Training and Flight Personnel Training – Astrakhan
  - 116th Training center operational use — Astrakhan — MiG-23, MiG-29
  - 42nd Training center operational use — Ashuluk — SAM and targets.
- 344th Centre for Combat Training and Flight Personnel Training – Torzhok (ground forces helicopters) (ru:344 Центр боевой подготовки и переучивания лётного состава армейской авиации)
  - 696th Research and Instruction Helicopter Regiment (Torzhok) (Ka-50, Mi-8, Mi-24, Mi-26, has used Mi-28)
  - 92nd Research and Instruction Helicopter Squadron (Sokol-Vladimir (Ruwiki says Klin)) (Mi-8, Mi-24)
- 924th Centre for Combat Training and Flight Personnel Training – Yegoryevsk Base UAV.
  - 275th Separate research and UAV squadron instructors (Unmanned Aerial Vehicles), Yegoryevsk, Moscow Oblast. UAV Tu-143, Yakovlev Pchela-1T, IAI Searcher 2 .
- Russian State Scientific-Research Institute Centre for Cosmonaut Training – Zvezdnyi Goronok
- 70th Separate test and training Aviation Regiment Special Purpose — Chkalovski — Il-76 and other.
- 2881st Reserve Helicopter Base – Totskoye – Mi-24P
- 5th Independent Long-Range Reconnaissance Aviation Detachment – Voronezh (CFE and INF verification)
- 185th Centre for Combat Training and Flight Personnel Training – Astrakhan
- 118th Independent Helicopter Squadron – Chebenki (Dmitriyevka), Orenburg Oblast
- 4020th Base for Reserve Aircraft – Lipetsk
- 4215th Base for Reserve Aircraft – Chebenki
- 15th Army Aviation Brigade of the Western Military District at the airport Ostrov, Pskov Oblast

=== Warehouses, Storage and Maintenance Depots, Aircraft Repair Plants ===
(Russian: List of Aircraft Factories in Russia)

- Central Aviation Base of Rocket Armament and Ammunition, Sergiyev Posad, Moscow Oblast
- Aviation Warehouse of Rocket Armament and Ammunition, Yoshkar-Ola
- Supply and Storage Depot of Air Defense Rocket Armament, Serpukhov, Moscow Oblast
- Storage and Maintenance Depot of Unmanned Aerial Vehicles, Yaroslavl (Tunoshna)
- 502nd Military Equipment Maintenance Plant, Fryazevo (Noginsk-5)
- 1015th Military Equipment Maintenance Plant, Nizhniye Sergi-3, Sverdlovsk Oblast
- 1019th Military Equipment Maintenance Plant, Onokhoy-2, Buryat Republic
- 1253rd Central Radar Armament Maintenance Base, Samara-28
- 2227th Armament Maintenance and Storage Base, Trudovaya, Moscow Oblast
- 2503rd Central Base of Automated Control Systems Maintenance, Yanino-1, Leningrad Oblast
- 2529th Central Base of Armament Maintenance, Khabarovsk
- 2633rd Base of Armament Maintenance and Storage, Lyubertsy, Moscow Oblast
- 3821st Base of Armament Maintenance and Storage, Tosno, Leningrad Oblast
- 20th Aircraft Overhaul Plant, Pushkin-3 (not an inhabited locality, or name is misspelled), Leningrad Oblast
- 150th Aircraft Overhaul Plant, Lyublino-Novoye, Kaliningrad Oblast
- 419th Aircraft Overhaul Plant, Gorelovo, Leningrad Oblast
- 695th Aircraft Overhaul Plant (Factory), Aramil, Sverdlovsk Oblast
- 99th Air-Technical Equipment Plant, Ostafyevo (Shcherbinka), Moscow Oblast
- 5212nd Testing and Control (Docking?) Station, Znamensk, Astrakhan Oblast

=== Training and Research Organisations ===
- 2nd Central Scientific-Research Institute — Tver
- 13th State Scientific Research Institute "ERAT" Luberchi, Moscow Oblast
- 30th Central Scientific-Research Institute (ЦНИИ АКТ) — Shelkovo, also includes research institutes in Noginsk.
- Gagarin Military Air Academy (VVA) — Monino
- Zhukovsky Air Force Engineering Academy — Moscow
- Zhukov Command Academy of Air Defense — Tver ( branch in the St. Petersburg )
- Yaroslavl Anti-aircraft Missile Defence Institute
- Chelyabinsk Red Banner Military Aviation Institute of Navigators
  - 604th Training Aviation Regiment — Chelyabinsk Shagol Airport
- Voronezh Central Military Aviation Engineering University (VCMAEU)
  - Both the Irkutsk Military Aviation Engineering Institute and the Tambov Military Aviation Engineering Institute were disbanded in 2009 and transferred to VCMAEU.
- Krasnodar Military Aviation Institute (L-39Cs); by 2016, the Krasnodar Higher Military Aviation Pilots College Named for Hero of the Soviet Union A.K. Serov
  - 704th Training Aviation Regiment — Котельниково — L-39
  - 627th Training Aviation Regiment — Тихорецк — Л-39
  - 797th Training Aviation Regiment — Кущевская — L-39, Su-25, Su-27, MiG-29
- Syzran Military Aviation Institute (Mi-2, Mi-8T and Mi-24V, Ansat, Ka-226T
  - 131st Training Aviation Regiment — Saratov-Sokol — Mi-2, Mi-8
  - 484th Training Helicopter Regiment — Syzran airfield — Mi-24
  - 626th Training Helicopter Regiment — Pugachev — Mi-2, Mi-8, Mi-24
  - Branch in Kirov, Kirov Oblast
- 783rd Training Centre (Armavir) (MiG-29, L-39C)
  - 713th Training Aviation Regiment — Armavir — L-39, MiG-29
  - 761st Training Aviation Regiment — Khanskaya — L-39
- 786th Training Centre (Borisoglebsk):
  - 160th Training Aviation Regiment — Borisoglebsk — Su-27
  - 644th Training Aviation Regiment — Michurinsk — L-39, Su-24, Su-25, MiG-29
- 705th Training Aviation Center for Training Flight Crews and Long-Range military transport aircraft – Balashov:
  - 606th Training Aviation Regiment – Balashov
  - 666th Training Aviation Regiment – Rtishchevo
- Center for anti-aircraft missile troops, Uchhoz (Gatchina-3), the Leningrad Region. Chief – Colonel Alexander Dobrovolsky.
- 357th Training Center, Belgorod. Chief – Colonel Viktor Baranov.
- 834th Centre for Signal Corps Radio and ensure Novgorod. Chief – Colonel Vasily Fedosov.
- 874th training center (settlement) of radio engineering troops, Vladimir. Chief – Colonel Yuri Balaban.
- 902nd Training Center (settlement) of anti-aircraft missile troops Kosterevo-1, Vladimir Oblast.

=== Medical and athletic facilities ===
- State Research Institute of Aviation and Space Medicine, Moscow. Chief – Major-General Igor Ushakov.
- 5th Central Military Research Aviation Hospital, Krasnogorsk-3, Moscow Region.
- 7th Central Military Research Aviation Hospital, Moscow.
- Spa Air Force, Chemitokvadzhe, Krasnodar Krai. Chief – Colonel Theodore Barantsev.
- Central Sports Club VVS Samara. Chief – Colonel Dmitry Shlyahtin.
- 361st Center of Psychophysiological Training of personnel, Agha, Krasnodar region.
- 709th Center of Psychophysiological Training of personnel, Anapa (now Dzhubga), Krasnodar region.
- 464th Training Center for Physical Culture and Sports, Ufa, Bashkortostan.

The list of Soviet Air Force bases shows a number that are still active with the Russian Air Force.

With the Air Force now fusing into one joint service branch the personnel from the Russian Aerospace Defence Forces and their respective facilities, the following now report to the Aerospace Forces HQ:

- Space Command (Russian: Космическое командование (KK)):
  - 153rd Main Trial Centre for Testing and Control of Space Means named after G.S. Titov at Krasnoznamensk (Russian: Главный испытательный центр испытаний и управления космическими средствами имени Германа Титова)
  - 820th Main Centre for Missile Attack Warning (SPRN) (Russian: центр предупреждения о ракетном нападении (цпрн)) in Solnechnogorsk
  - 821st Main Space Surveillance Centre (SKKP) (Russian: центр контроля космического пространства (цккп)) in Noginsk-9, Moscow Oblast

Early warning of missile attack:

Voronezh radar at Lekhtusi, Armavir, Kaliningrad, Mileshevka, Yeniseysk, Barnaul
Daryal radar at Pechora
Volga radar at Hantsavichy
Dnepr radar at Balkhash, Irkutsk and Olenegorsk
Oko early warning satellites

Space surveillance:

Okno in Tajikistan
Krona in Zelenchukskaya and Nakhodka
RT-70 in Yevpatoria (since its annexation by the Russian Federation, Crimea's status, and thus that of the city of Yevpatoria which is located on Crimea, is under dispute between Russia and Ukraine; Ukraine and the majority of the international community considers Crimea and Yevpatoria an integral part of Ukraine, while Russia, on the other hand, considers Crimea and Yevpatoria an integral part of Russia) and Galenki (together with Roscosmos)

Missile defense:

A-135 anti-ballistic missile system
Don-2N radar
A-235 anti-ballistic missile system (future; after 2020)

Satellite systems:

Liana space reconnaissance and target designation system (3 electronic reconnaissance satellites 14F145 "Lotus-C1")

- Air and Space Defence Command (Russian: Командование противовоздушной и противоракетной обороны (К ПВО И ПРО)):
  - 9th Missile Defence Division (A-135 anti-ballistic missile system) in Pushkino
  - 4th Missile Defence Brigade in Dolgoprudny
  - 5th Missile Defence Brigade in Vidnoye
  - 6th Missile Defence Brigade in Rzhev
- State Testing Plesetsk Cosmodrome (Russian: Государственный испытательный космодром «Плесецк» (ГИК «Плесецк»))
  - Kura Test Range

=== Squadrons ===
As of 2014:

- 8 × Bomber squadrons (4 operating Tu-22M3/MR; 3 operating Tu-95MS; 1 operating Tu-160)
- 37 × Fighter squadrons (8 operating MiG-29; 3 operating MiG-29SMT; 11 operating MiG-31/MiG-31BM; 10 operating Su-27; 4 operating Su-27SM1/Su-30M2; 1 operating Su-27SM3/Su-30M2)
- 27 × Attack squadrons (11 operating the Su-24M/Su-24M2; 13 operating Su-25/Su-25SM; 3 operating Su-34)
- 10 × Attack & Reconnaissance squadrons (1 operating Su-24M/MR; 8 operating Su-24MR; 1 operating Mig-25RB)
- 1 × AEW&C squadron (1 operating A-50/A50-U)
- 1 × Tanker squadron (1 operating Il-78/Il-78M)

== Equipment ==
The precise quantitative and qualitative composition of the VVS is unknown and figures include both serviceable and unserviceable aircraft as well as those placed into storage or sitting in reserve. FlightGlobal estimated that there were about 3,947 aircraft in inventory in 2015. According to the Russian Defense Ministry, the share of modern armament in the VVS had reached about 35% during 2014. The figure was raised to 66% by late 2016 and to 72% by late 2017. According to the Russian Ministry of Defense, the Russian Air Force received in 2023 more than 100 new and repaired aircraft and 150 helicopters.

Estimates provided by the IISS show that VVS combat pilots average 60 to 100 flight hours per year and pilots flying transport aircraft average 120 flight hours per year.

=== Radars ===
The VVS operates several Nebo-M radars, that combine meter, decimeter, and centimeter range. First two Nebo-M regiments were deployed in 2017 to Saint Petersburg and Kareliya. In 2018, further two regiments were deployed to Crimea and Penza. In 2019, a regiment was delivered to Volga region. In 2020, two regiments were deployed to the Far East and Naryan Mar.

Additionally, the VVS operates radars that work in meter range only. Such systems are Nebo-UM (first units were delivered in 2018 to Voronezh and in 2020 to Rostov-on-Don) as well as Rezonans-NE radars that have been constructed in the Arctic in Zapolyarniy, Indiga, Shoyna and Nova Zemlya, with another in Gremikha under construction.

== Ranks and insignia ==
The VVS inherited the ranks of the Soviet Union, although the insignia and uniform were slightly altered and the old Tsarist crown and double-headed eagle were re-introduced. The VVS uses the same rank structure as the Russian Ground Forces.

Rank group	General/Flag/Air officers				Senior officers			Junior officers
Russian Aerospace Forces
Russian Aerospace Forces	Генера́л а́рмии Generál ármii	Генера́л-полко́вник; Generál-polkóvnik	Генера́л-лейтена́нт; Generál-leytenánt	Генера́л-майо́р; Generál-mayór	Полко́вник; Polkóvnik	Подполко́вник; Podpolkóvnik	Майо́р; Majór	Kапита́н; Kapitán	Старший лейтена́нт Stárshiy leytenánt	Лейтенант; Leytenant	Mла́дший лейтена́нт Mládshiy leytenánt

Rank group	Senior NCOs						Junior NCOs	Enlisted
Russian Aerospace Forces
Russian Aerospace Forces	Ста́рший пра́порщик Stárshiy práporshchik	Пра́порщик; Práporshchyk	Старшина́ Starshyná	Ста́рший сержа́нт Stárshiy serzhánt	Сержа́нт; Serzhánt	Мла́дший сержа́нт Mládshiy serzhánt	Ефре́йтор; Efréĭtor	Рядово́й; Ryadovóy

== Aircraft procurement ==
Production of the Russian aerospace industry for the Russian Armed Forces, 'by year of manufacture (first flight):

Fixed-wing aircraft
Type	Prev.	2010	2011	2012	2013	2014	2015	2016	2017	2018	2019	2020	2021	2022	Total	Total ordered
An-140-100				2	3	2			1	1					9	
An-148-100E				2	2	4		3	2	3					15	15
A-100									1						1	
Diamond DA42T																35
Il-76MD-90A				1				1							6	27
L-410UVP										3						18
MiG-29KR/KUBR					2/2	8/2	10/0								20/4	24
MiG29SMT/UBT	28/6						3/2	11/0							42/8	50
MiG-35S/UB											1S/1UB	3S/1UB	2		8	
Su-27SM3		4	8						4	6					22	
Su-30M2		2	2		3	8	3	2							20	20
Su-30SM				2	14	21	27	21	17	14			4		120	
Su-34	3	4	6	10	14	18	18	16	16	12	8	4	6		135	157
Su-35S				2	8	24	12	12	10	10	10	10	3		103	128
Su-57												1	2	2	5	78
Tu-154M				2											2	
Tu-214R/ON/PU-SBUS	1/0/0		0/1/0		0/1/0	1/0/0			0/0/2						2/2/2	6
Yak-130	3	6	3	15	18	20	14	10	6	14		4	2		115	138
Total	41	16	20	36	67	109	89	76	56	57	20	23	19		629	

Helicopters
Type	Prev.	2010	2011	2012	2013	2014	2015	2016	2017	2018	2019	2020	Total	Total ordered
Ansat-U	6	2	5	6	6	6	6	3	10				50	
Ka-31				1–2									1–2	
Ka-52	3	4	12	21				14	12				66	
Ka-226				10–11									10–11	
Mi-8/Mi-17				10										
Mi-26T			4	7	4	4		1	3				23	
Mi-28N/UB/NM	13/0/0	11/0/0	12/0/0	15-18/0/0	14/1/0						3/4/2		66–69	
Mi-24/Mi-35M			6	10–29	28	16					4/6		70–89	
Total													250–274	

== Future of the Russian Air Force ==
Aircraft	Origin	Class	Role	Status	Notes
Sukhoi Su-75	Russia	Jet	Fighter	1 prototype	First flight expected in early 2026 according to Russian state media.
Ilyushin Il-276	Russia	Jet	Cargo	In development	Partnership with India ended in 2016.
Beriev A-100	Russia	Jet	AWACS	2 prototypes	Replacement for A-50
Ilyushin Il-78MD-90A	Russia	Jet	Tanker	1 prototype	Replacement for Il-78 10 ordered, production starting in 2021.
Ilyushin Il-212	Russia	Jet	Transport	2 prototypes	Replacement for An-26 & An-72
Ilyushin Il-100 PAK VTA	Russia	Jet	Transport	In development	Future super-heavy transport airplane
Kamov Ka-60/62	Russia	Rotorcraft	Transport	2 prototypes	Certification of the Ka-62 expected to begin until the end of 2018
Mikoyan MiG-41	Russia	Jet	Interceptor	In study	New long-range interceptor, to replace the MiG-31 after 2025
Mil Mi-38T	Russia	Rotorcraft	Transport	4 prototypes	Serial production expected after 2020
Sukhoi Okhotnik	Russia	Jet	Stealth UCAV	2 prototypes	Stealth UCAV, encompassing some technologies of the Su-57
Tupolev PAK DA	Russia	Jet	Stealth bomber	In development	Future stealth strategic bomber, first flight expected in the mid-2020s according to Russian state media.
Tupolev Tu-160M2	Russia	Jet	Bomber	4 delivered	10 on order
Yakovlev Yak-152	Russia	Propeller	Trainer	4 prototypes	150 on order for GVP 2018–2027

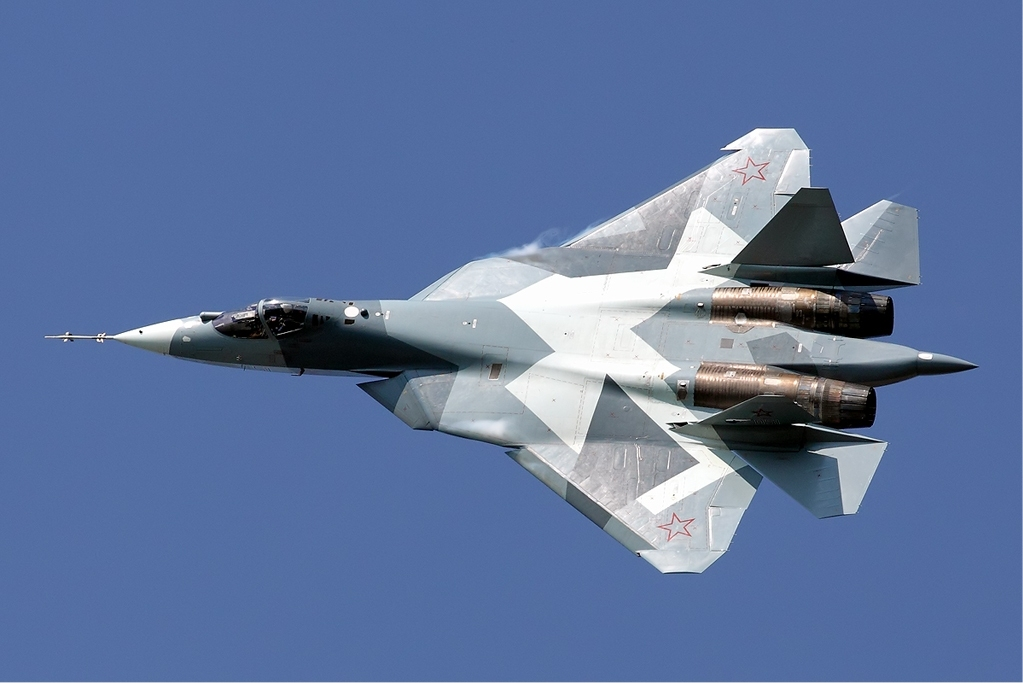
Sukhoi Su-57

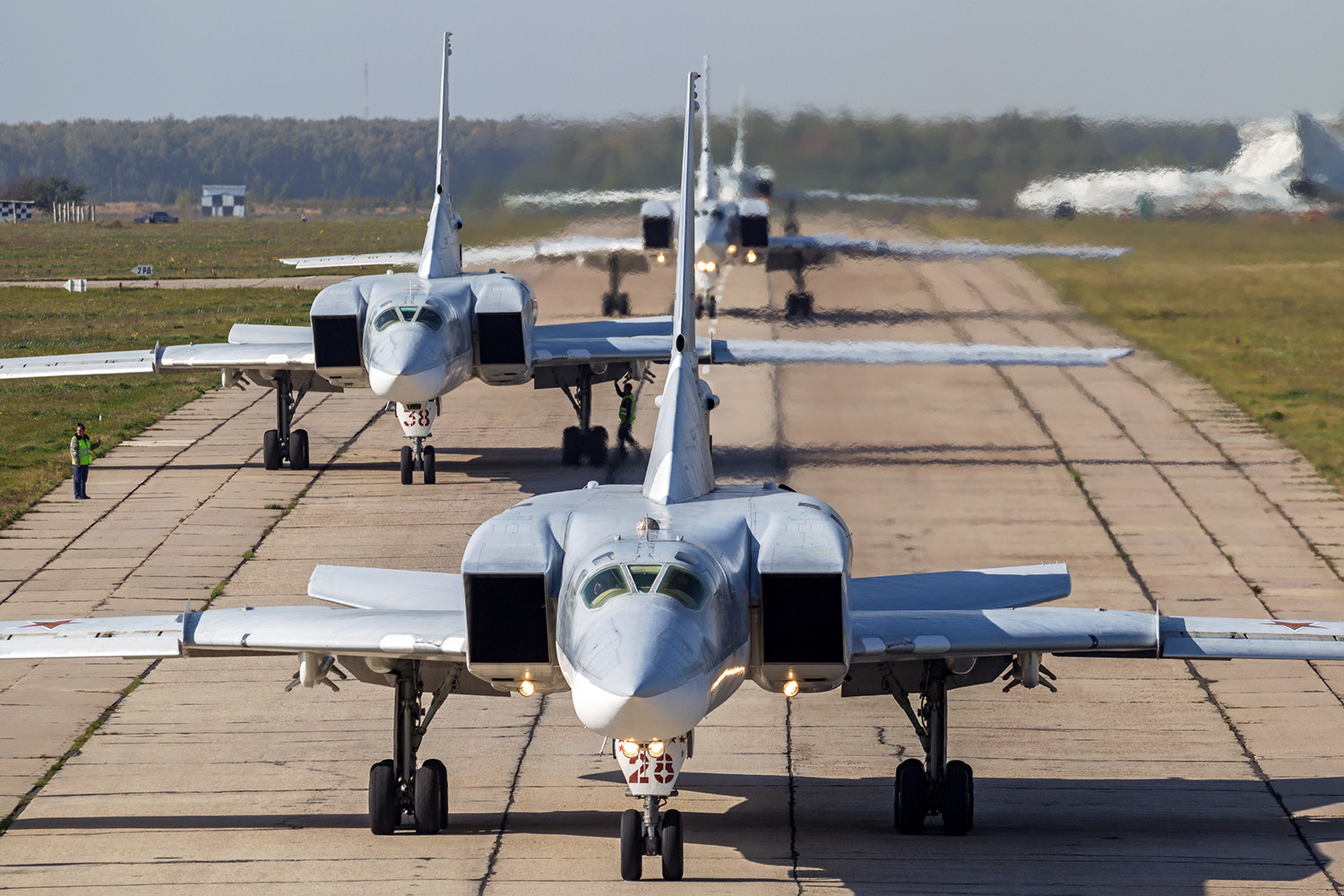
Tupolev Tu-22M

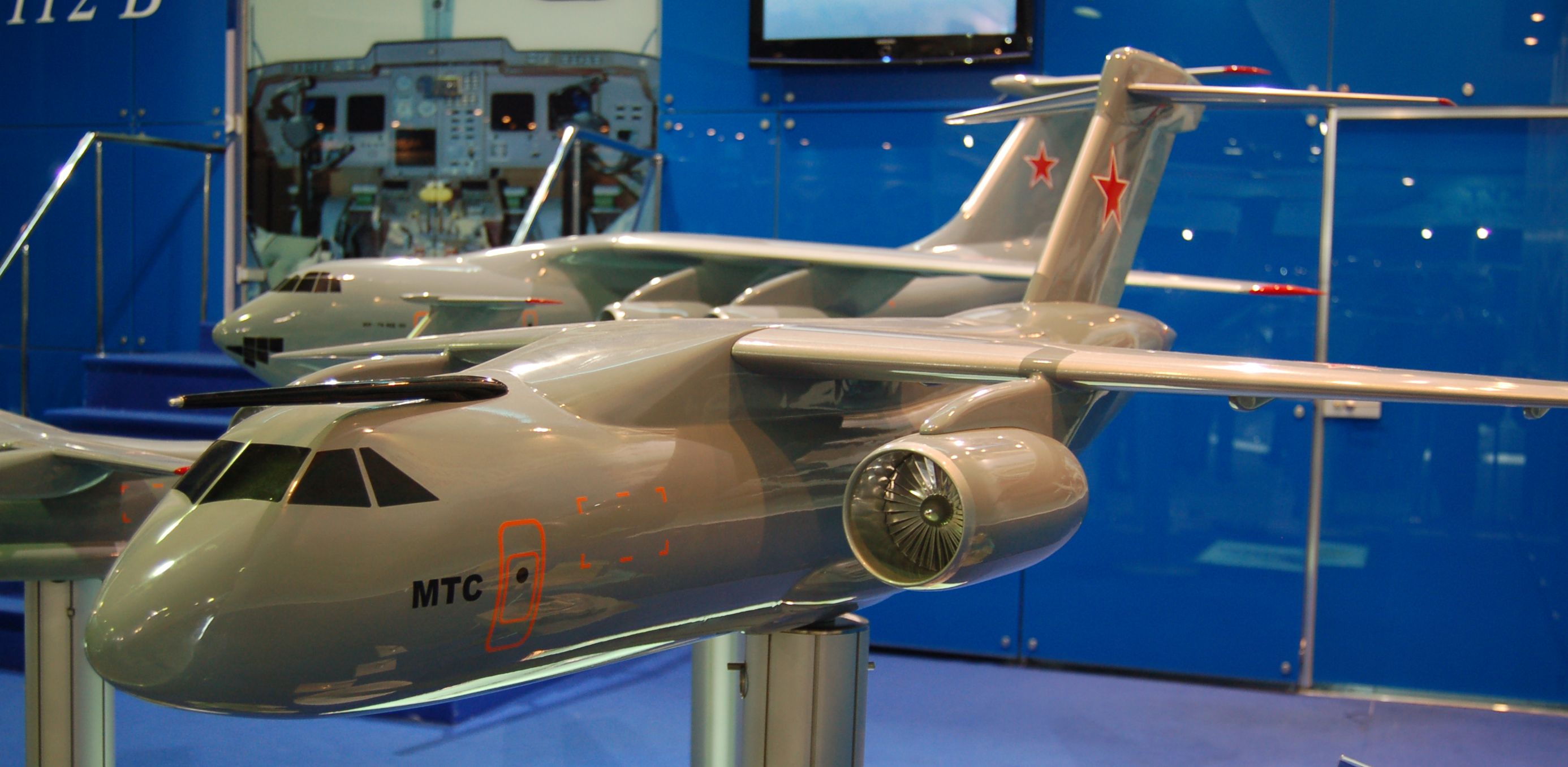
Ilyushin Il-276

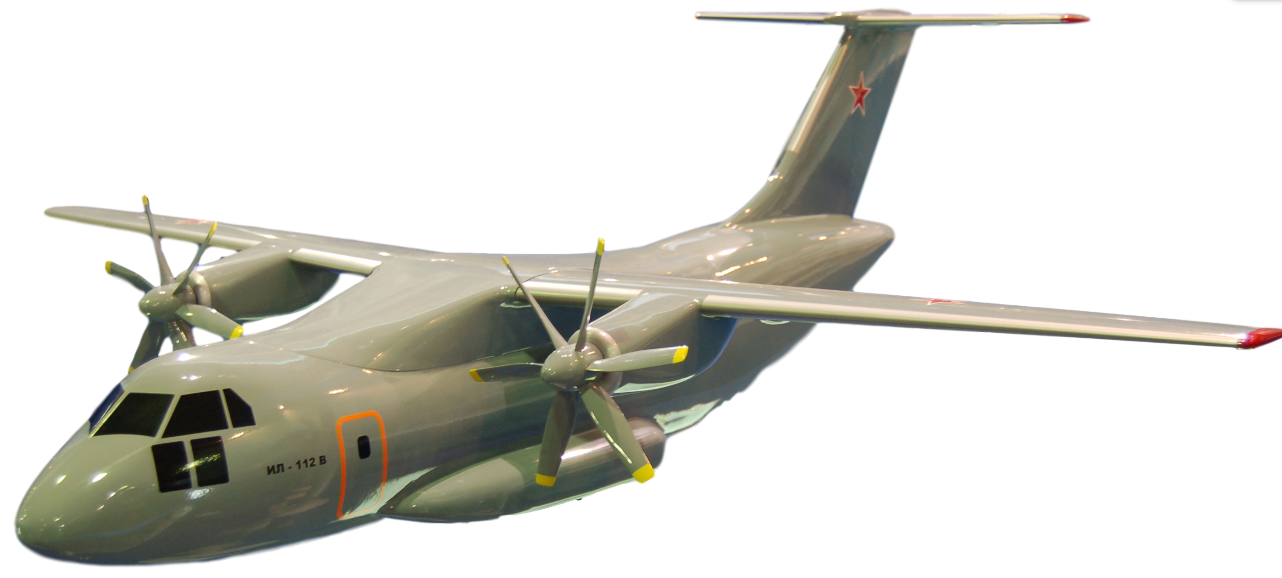
Ilyushin Il-112

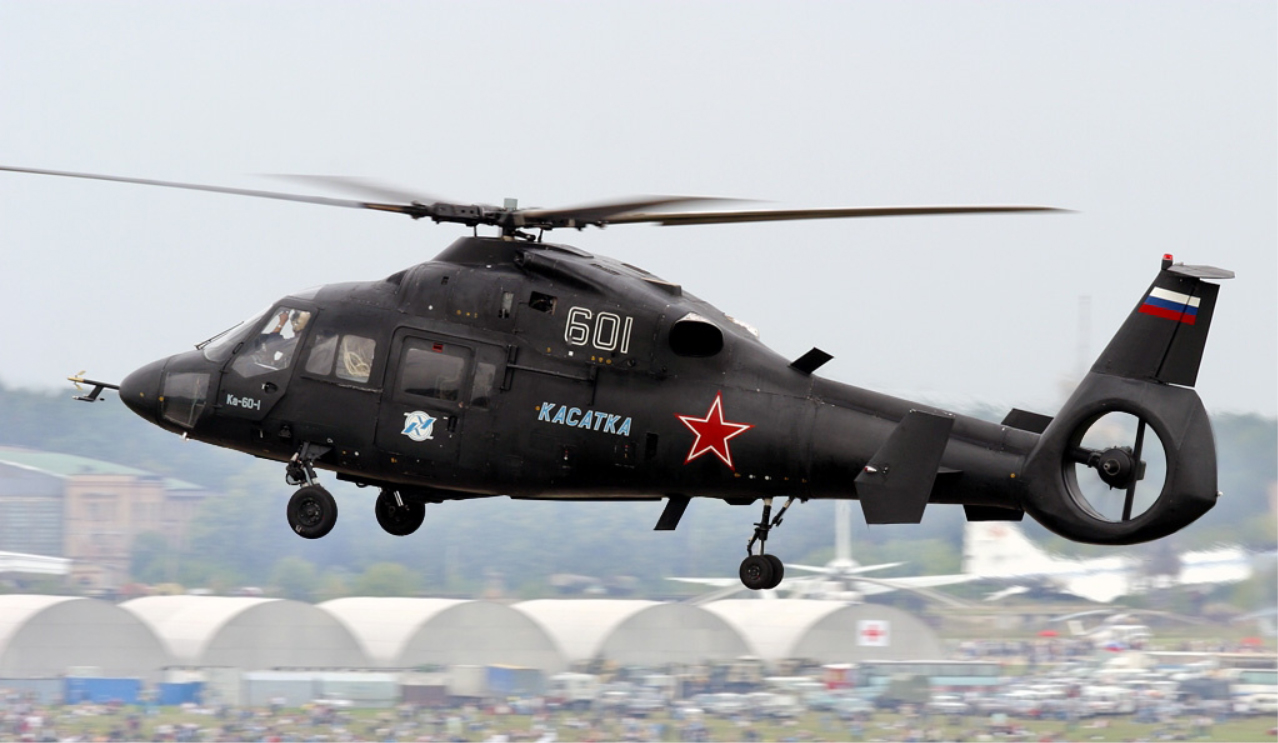
Kamov Ka-60

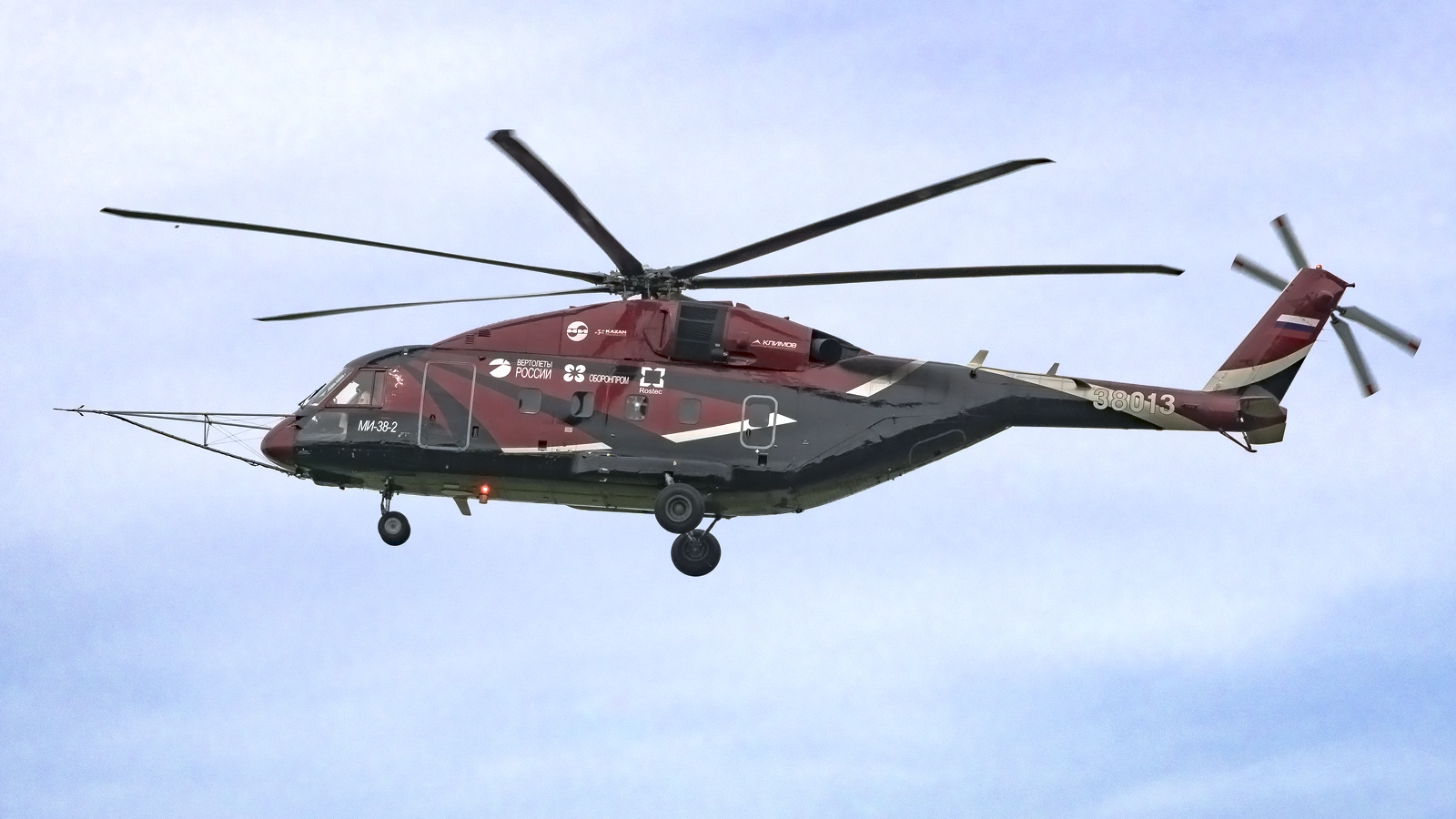
Mi-38

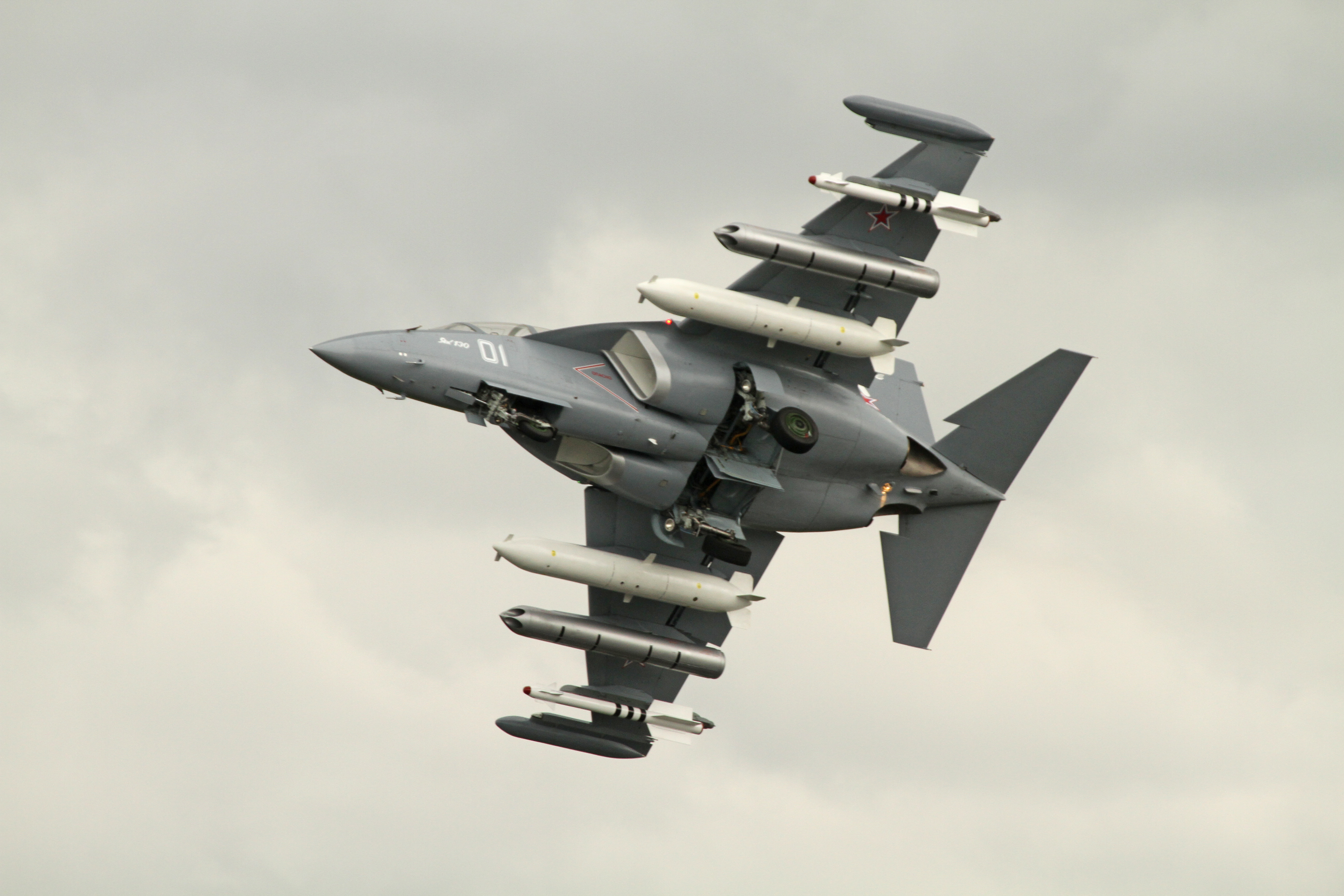
Yakovlev Yak-130

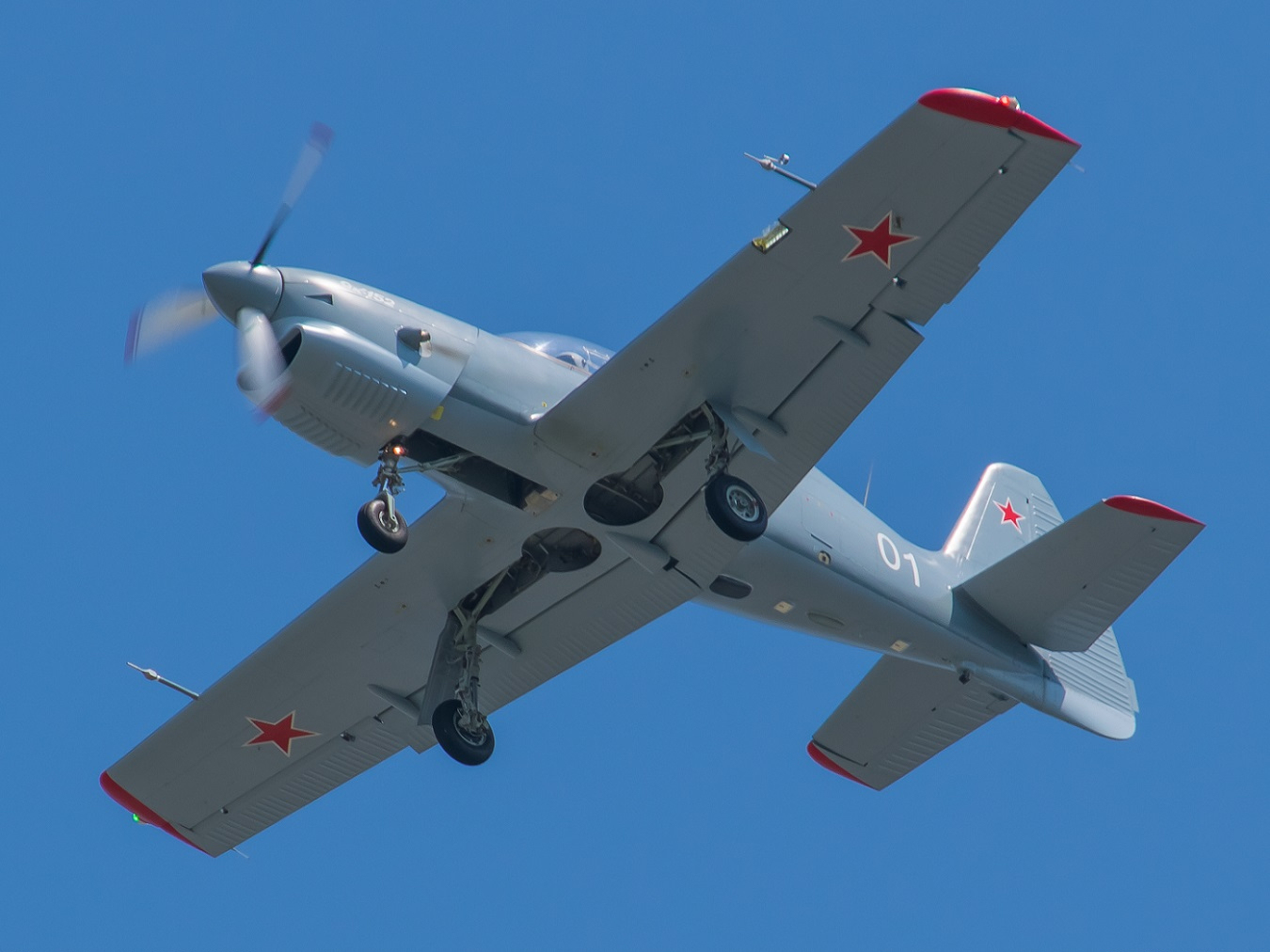
Yak-152

== See also ==
- Orders, decorations, and medals of Russia
- Honorary titles of Russia
- List of Russian aviators
- Air Intelligence of Russia

== Sources ==
- Higham, Robin (editor). Russian Aviation and Air Power in the Twentieth Century. Routledge, 1998. ISBN 0-7146-4784-5
- Palmer, Scott W. Dictatorship of the Air: Aviation Culture and the Fate of Modern Russia. New York: Cambridge University Press, 2006. ISBN 0-521-85957-3
