= 15th Aerospace Forces Army =

15th Special Purpose Aerospace Forces Army
- 15-я армия Воздушно-космические силы особого назначения
- Active: 2011–present
- Country: Russia
- Branch: Russian Space Forces
- Garrison/HQ: Moscow

The 15th Special Purpose Aerospace Forces Army (Russian: 15-я армия Воздушно-космические силы особого назначения) is a military formation of the Russian Space Forces formed on December 1, 2011. It is headquartered in Moscow.

The purpose of the unit is to operate ballistic missile early warning systems and to conduct other military operations relevant to the space domain, including satellite command and control.

== History ==
The unit was created on December 1, 2011, as a unit directly under the Russian Aerospace Forces (VKS). In 2015 when the Russian Space Forces were reestablished the 15th Aerospace Forces Army was reassigned to the Space Command.

== Structure ==
Structure of the unit as of 2019:

- Main Missile Attack Early Warning Center
- Main Centre for Reconnaissance of Situation in Space
- Titov Main Test and Space Systems Control Center
