= Moment space surveillance complex =

Moment
- Момент
- Part of 821st Main Space Intelligence Centre
- Moscow Oblast

Site information
- Owner: Russian Aerospace Forces
- Controlled by: Russian Space Forces
- Condition: testing

Site history
- Built: 2003

Moment (Russian: Момент, from Latin: momentum, meaning in English: short time) is a Russian military space surveillance complex. It is used to monitor radio emissions from space craft and satellites, a form of electronic intelligence gathering. It is run by the Russian Space Forces as part of their 821st Main Space Intelligence Centre (SKKP) which operates the space surveillance network. It was put into service for experimental combat duty in 2003.

Moment originated with the Russian military company Vympel. They published a draft design for the system in 1989, along with other space surveillance technologies, including the Krona space object recognition station and the Laser Optical Locator. Work on the Moment complex itself started in 1991. Moment's design work was done by Experimental Design Bureau MEI (Russian: ОКБ МЭИ) under lead designer K. A. Pobedonostsev. MEI was founded as part of the Moscow Power Engineering Institute and undertakes work on antennae, telemetry and other radio and space related technologies. It is part of the JSC Russian Space Systems. Their work on Moment was done under contract to Vympel.

Moment was put into experimental combat duty on 20 March 2003, and as of 2012 has yet to be formally commissioned. It works passively, picking up radio transmissions from spacecraft and satellites which it can use to locate them, and to discern other things about them. MEI have produced similar systems such as the civilian RIDM.

Moment has been installed somewhere in the Moscow Oblast, and is moveable. It may be co-located with the Centre for Space Monitoring at Noginsk-9. It has the GRAU index 14G6 (14Г6)
