= Russian Space Forces =

Branch of the Russian Aerospace Forces

- Космические войска России; Kosmicheskie voyska Rossii
- Emblem of the Russian Space Forces
- Active: 1992–1997; 2001–2011; 1 August 2015 – present
- Country: Russia
- Type: Space force
- Role: Space warfare
- Part of: Russian Aerospace Forces
- March: 14 минут до старта ("14 Minutes Until Start", official march)
- Anniversaries: 4 October (Space Forces Day)
- Engagements: Russian military intervention in the Syrian civil war

Commanders
- Commander-in-Chief of the Aerospace Forces: Aleksandr Chayko
- Commander of the Space Forces: Aleksandr Golovko

Insignia
- Flag

- Middle emblem

- Insignia

The Russian Space Forces (Russian: Космические войска России, КВ, romanized: Kosmicheskie voyska Rossii, KV) is the space force branch of the Russian Aerospace Forces. It was reestablished following the 1 August 2015 merger between the Russian Air Force and the Russian Aerospace Defence Forces, after the independent arm of service was dissolved in 2011.

Formed on 10 August 1992 alongside the creation of the Russian Armed Forces, the Russian Space Forces was the first independent space force in the world. The organization shared control of the Baikonur Cosmodrome with Roscosmos, the Federal Space Agency. It also operated the Plesetsk and the Svobodny Cosmodromes. However the Russian Space Forces was dissolved in July 1997 and incorporated into the Strategic Missile Forces.

The Russian Space Forces was once again reformed as an independent troop on 1 June 2001, under a military reorganization. However, by December 2011, it was dissolved once again and this time replaced by the Russian Aerospace Defence Forces.

On 1 August 2015, the Russian Air Force and the Russian Aerospace Defence Forces were merged to form the Russian Aerospace Forces. The Russian Space Forces was reestablished as a result, and is now one of three sub-branches of the new military branch.

== History ==
=== Soviet Strategic Missile Forces space troops ===
The Soviet Space Troops date back to 12 February 1955, when the Central Committee of the Communist Party of the Soviet Union and the Council of Ministers of the Soviet Union issued a joint executive order for the establishment of Scientific Research and Testing Range for the development of space exploration technology, codenamed Tayga Installation (Объект «Тайга»). The range was formally established on 2 June 1955, on Plot 10 - Zarya in Kyzylorda Region of the Kazakh Soviet Socialist Republic, when the General Staff of the Soviet Army established the structure and manpower requirements of the range and assigned the formal designation of 5th Scientific Research and Testing Range (5th SRTR, 5-й Научно-исследовательский испытательный полигон (5-й НИИП)).

Space exploration was a military activity from the beginning in the Soviet Union, unlike in the United States where it was the province of the civilian NASA. It was an integral part of the Soviet strategic ballistic missile force and at the time of the range's creation in 1955 this was the portfolio of the Deputy Minister of Defence for Special Weaponry and Rocket Technology. The first Deputy Minister, appointed in March of the same year, was then Marshal of Artillery Mitrofan Ivanovich Nedelin, later Chief Marshal. On 17 December 1959, Marshal Nedelin's Deputy Minister apparatus was transformed into the Strategic Missile Forces (RVSN).

As a military unit the range received the designation Military Detachment 11284 (войсковая часть 11284). The range was initially commanded by a Colonel of the RVSN, but it had an extensive force structure of division equivalent with its own aviation (the 28th Separate Composite Aviation Squadron, 28-я отдельная смешанная авиаэскадрилья and the 6th Separate Aviation Flight, 6-е отдельное авиационное звено), a missile assembly brigade, its own railway network, security, logistics, medical units and flight measurement units as far away as the Kamchatka Peninsula.

As a clear indication of the indivisible connection between the Soviet Strategic Missile Forces and the Soviet space program the 627th Missile Regiment (627-й Ракетный полк) was reassigned from the 28th Guards Missile Division to the 5th SRTR on 1 August 1961. On 19 October 1961, its designation changed to the 43rd Separate Engineer Testing Detachment (43-я отдельная инженерно-испытательная часть (51-я ОИИЧ)). While subordinated to the Baykonur Cosmodrome the 43rd SET Detachment conducted the state evaluation program of the R-16U type ICBM and accomplished the first launch from an underground shaft on 13 July 1962.

The unit also had the task to demonstrate Soviet ballistic missiles to foreign delegations. For example, the demonstration launch for the French President Charles de Gaulle on 25 June 1966. The 43rd SET Det. was disbanded in 1968. Another operational unit transferred to the 5th SRTR was the 676th Missile Regiment (676-й ракетный полк), Military Detachment 44083 (в/ч 44083) of the 14th Missile Division, reassigned to the Range on 10 April 1961.

On 25 January 1962, its designation changed to 51st Separate Engineer Testing Detachment (51-я отдельная инженерно-испытательная часть (51-я ОИИЧ)), but the number 44083 was retained. The Detachment operated three surface launch pads and three underground launch shafts for the R-9A ICBMs. It was disbanded on 7 December 1971.

The 311th Missile Regiment of the 49th Guards Missile Division transferred to the Range on 13 October 1962, and changed designation to the 6th Separate Engineer Testing Detachment (6-я отдельная инженерно-испытательная часть (6-я ОИИЧ)). The regiment, later the detachment, had military number 44108 (в/ч 44108), which changed in 1966 to 45856.

The Soviet space troops achieved the first successful launch of a human into space on 12 April 1961. As a maskirovka measure the Soviet TASS news agency mentioned the cosmodrome under the name Baykonur (Байконур) by the name of the nearest train station of the Trans-Caspian railway. The Soviet military internally used the geographic designation of Tyuratam (Тюратам) from the closest Kazakh village. On the same day the 5th SRTR received its battle standard as a military formation.

While heavily involved in the Soviet space program, the Range simultaneously carried out the task of being the test center for the country's ICBM force. For that reason it had four test directorates (roughly brigade equivalents):

- 1st Test Directorate (1-е Испытательное управление (1 ИУ) (в/ч 44275)), testing ICBMs of the OKB Korolev;
- 2nd Test Directorate (2-е Испытательное управление (2 ИУ) (в/ч 54333)), testing ICBMs of the OKB Yangel;
- 3rd Test Directorate (3-е Испытательное управление (3 ИУ) (в/ч 63670, from 25.04.1964: 68526)), testing ICBMs of the OKB Korolev;
- 4th Test Directorate (4-е Испытательное управление (4 ИУ) (в/ч 26360)), testing ICBMs of the OKB Chelomey.

The 1st and the 2nd Test Directorates were the ones, who successfully carried out Yuri Gagarin's Vostok 1 spacecraft launch (the 3rd and 4th were not yet formed at the time), which once again comes as a testament for the indivisibility of the early Soviet space troops from the RVSN.

After the Baykonur Cosmodrome another space-related formation was added in 1957, when the Command and Measurement Complex for Control of Space Vehicles (Командно-измерительный комплекс управления космическими аппаратами (КИК УКА)) was formed initially in Bolshevo, later transferred to Krasnoznamensk, Moscow Oblast. Also in 1957 the construction of a missile launch range for the testing of R-7 ICBMs started near Mirny, Arkhangelsk Oblast, which later became the Plesetsk Cosmodrome.

In 1964, in order to bring the various space-related units and establishments together, the Soviet Ministry of Defence formed the Central Directorate for Space Assets of the Missile Troops of Strategic Purpose (Центральное управление космических средств Ракетных войск стратегического назначения (ЦУКОС РВСН). In 1970 the Directorate was upgraded from a Central to a Main Directorate (Главное управление космических средств (ГУКОС РВСН).

=== Independent troops ===
In 1981 the Main Directorate was taken out of the RVSN and subordinated to the Soviet General Staff with the corresponding re-designation from ГУКОС РВСН to ГУКОС ГШ ВС СССР. In 1986 the Main Directorate for Space Assets of the Ministry of Defence was reformed into the Directorate of the Chief of Space Assets and upgraded from a directorate under the General Staff, to a directorate directly subordinated to the Ministry of Defence (Управление начальника космических средств МО СССР).

After the collapse of the USSR in 1992 the Directorate of the Chief of Space Assets of the Ministry of Defence was reformed into a separate combat arm (род войск центрального подчинения) - Military Space Forces (Военно-космические силы (ВКС)). This is the moment when the Space Troops legally became a separate arm. Also noted should be the difference in designation. The Military Space Forces (Военно-космические силы) were a separate arm under the Ministry of Defence. They later became part of the Aerospace Forces (Воздушно-космические силы). These are different entities and it is important to take this into consideration in order to avoid mixing up the two, because they share the same acronym in Russian - ВКС (VKS).

=== Anti-Missile and Anti-Space Defence Troops ===
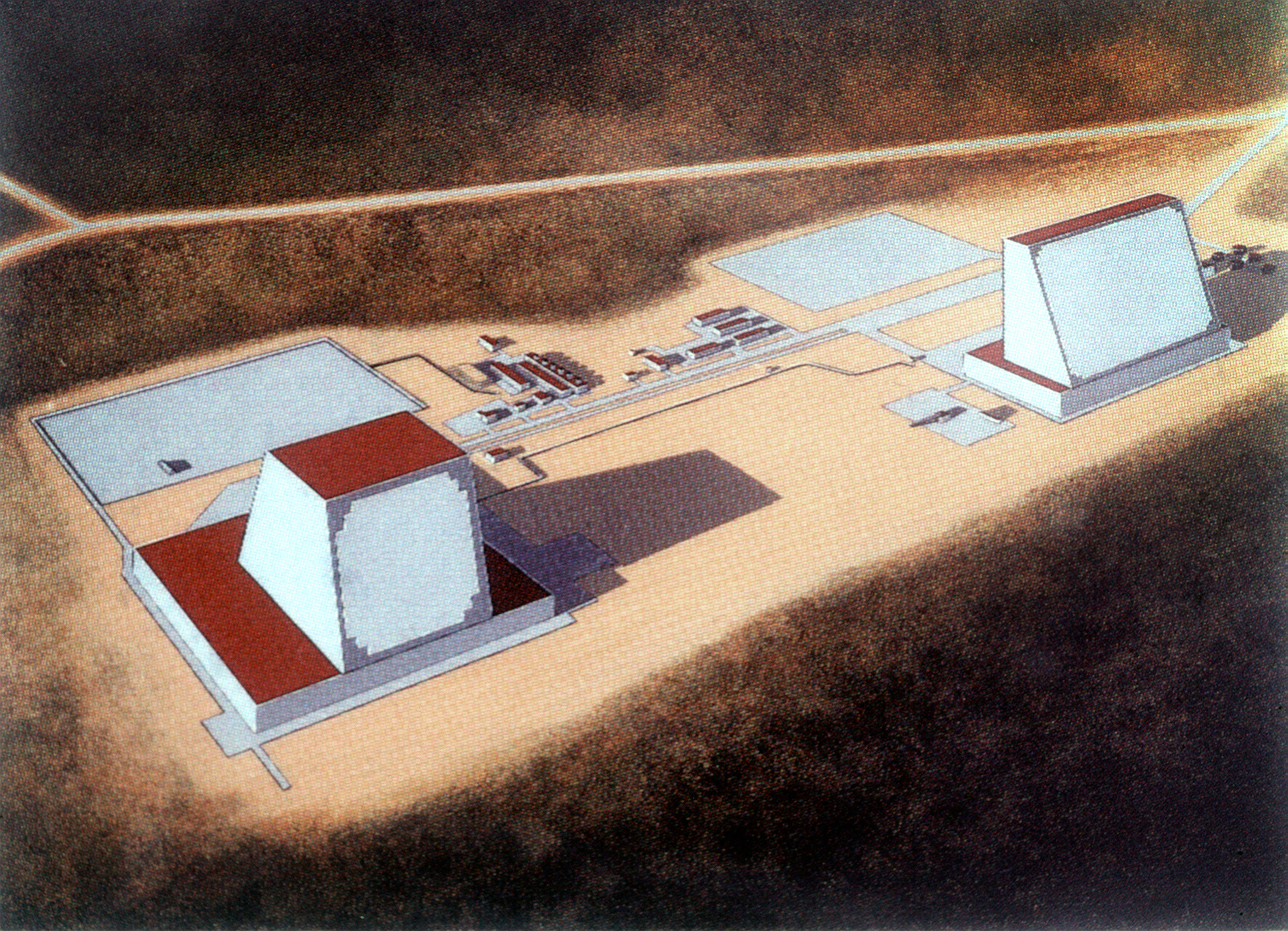
Pechora Radar Station

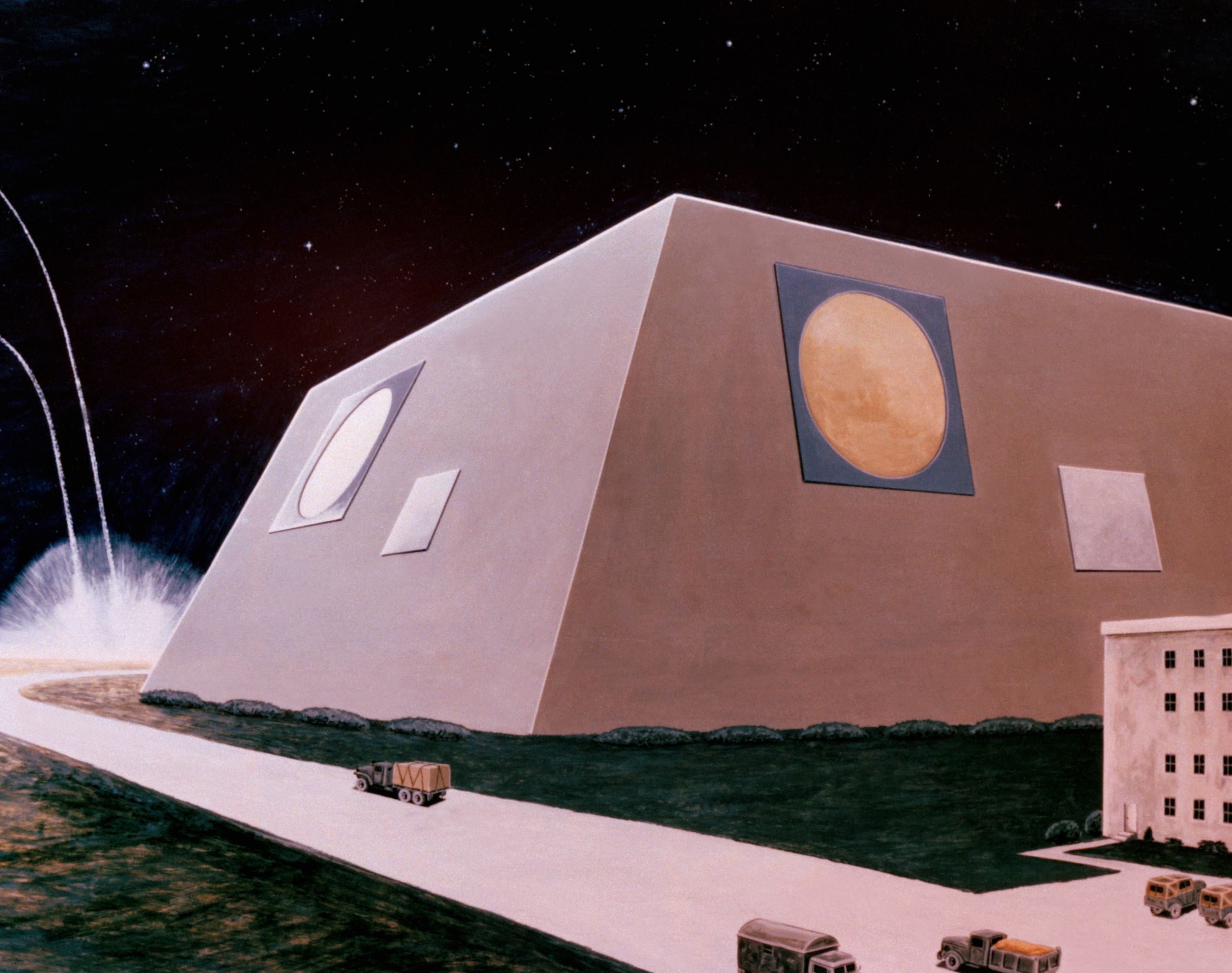
A-135 anti-ballistic missile system

On 30 March 1967, a Directorate of the Chief of Anti-Missile and Anti-Space Defence (Управление командующего войсками противоракетной и противокосмической (УКВ ПРО и ПКО)), under Lieutenant-General of Artillery Yuri Votintsev, was formed within the Soviet Air Defence Forces. In February 1971 the 1st Division for Warning Against Missile Attack (1st Division WAMA, 1-я Дивизия предупреждения о ракетном нападении (1-я дПРН)) was formed with HQ in Solnechnegorsk, the 57th Separate Radiotechnical Nod in Olenegorsk, Murmansk Oblast and the 129th Separate Radiotechnical Nod in Skrunda, Latvian SSR.

The 2nd Division for Space Observation (2nd Division SO, 2-я Дивизия разведки космического пространства (2-я дРКП)) followed in July 1973 with HQ in Serpukhov-15, the 145th Center for Space Control and 1069th Command Center (both in the closed military townlet of Noginsk-9, east of Moscow), the 46th Separate Radiotechnical Nod in Mishelyovka, Irkutskaya Oblast and the 49th Separate Radiotechnical Nod in the closed military townlet of Balkhash-9, Kazakh SSR.

In 1965 began the formation of a Space Control System (Система контроля космического пространства (ЦККП)). The headquarters was constructed in the Noginsk-9 closed military townlet east of Moscow. On 7 October 1965, the unit received the Military Unit designation 28289 (в/ч 28289). On 1 October 1966, a directive of the General Staff reformed the unit into the 45th Division for Space Control (45th Division SC, 45-я Дивизия контроля космического пространства) under the Air Defence Force.

In 1977 the 1st Division WAMA was expanded into the 3rd Separate Army of Special Purpose for Warning Against Missile Attack (3-я Отдельная армия предупреждения о ракетном нападении особого назначения (3-я ОА ПРН ОН)) and took over the 2nd Division SO. In 1978 the 9th Separate Corps for Anti-Missile Defence (9-й Отдельный корпус противоракетной обороны (9-й ОК ПРО)) was added to the Directorate of the Chief of Anti-Missile and Anti-Space Defence.

The Corps was originally formed on 22 January 1962, in Moscow as the Command of the 81st Radiotechnical Center (Управление РТЦ-81, Military Unit 16451 (в/ч 16451)). The unit moved later to Pavshino in 1963. In 1965 it was transformed into Directorate of the Chief of Anti-Missile Defence Troops of the Moscow Air Defence District (Управление начальника войск ПРО московского округа ПВО), Military Unit 75555 (в/ч 75555) and later in the same year moved to Solnechnogorsk. In 1972 it was reformed as the Second Directorate of the Commander of the Anti-Missile Defence Troops of the Moscow Air Defence District (Второе управление начальника войск ПРО московского округа ПВО). In 1976 it was reformed again, transferred from the Moscow ADD directly to the High Command of the Air Defence Force (Главное командование Войск ПВО) and correspondingly the designation changed to Second Directorate of the Commander of the Anti-Missile Defence Troops (Второе управление начальника войск ПРО).

Two years later in 1978 it relocated again to Akulovo, Moscow Oblast. It was reformed into the 9th Separate Corps for Anti-Missile Defence (9-й Oтдельный корпус противоракетной обороны (9-й ОК ПРО)). In 1988 the 45th Division SC was expanded into the 18th Separate Corps for Space Control (18-й Отдельный корпус контроля космический пространства). The 18th Separate Corps was reduced back into the 45th Division by the mid-1990s. It is still active today as the Main Centre for Reconnaissance of Situation in Space.

In 1992 the Anti-Missile and Anti-Space Defence Troops (Войска противоракетной и противокосмической обороны) of the Air Defence Force were renamed to the Missile and Space Defence Troops (Войска ракетно-космической обороны). In 1995 the HQ of the 9th Separate Corps AMD relocated to Sofrino-1, Pushkin District, Moscow Oblast. On 1 October 1998, the Corps was reduced into the 9th Division for Anti-Missile Defence and transferred from the Air Defence Force to the Missile Troops of Strategic Purpose. The division is still active today.

In 1997 the Missile and Space Defence Troops and the Military Space Troops were transferred to the RVSN. In the view of some experts, the merger of the Space Troops and the Anti-Missile and Anti-Space Troops and their subordination to the RVSN was a mistake that prevented the Russian military from developing space-based capabilities. Russian public television comment on the matter:

However, slightly over three years ago, it appeared to some-one, that, with a view to saving funds, it would be more sensible to strip the Military Space Forces of their independence and subordinate them to the Strategic Missile Troops -which has been done. In just the same way the country's air defense forces were made subordinate to the air force. Under the slogan of "optimizing", but, essentially, reducing the officer corps of the armed forces, the Military Space Forces were simply merged with the Strategic Missile Troops. In this way, the missile men command remained in their places virtually in full and almost the entire elite of military engineers were dispersed from the space forces. The military base, too, was destroyed. In the building of the Military Space Forces headquarters on Kaluga Square [Kaluzhskaya ploshchad], the very expensive fiber optic cable necessary for communicating with space facilities was ripped out. Afterward, this decision was deemed to have been erroneous.

On 1 October 1998, the 3rd Separate Army for Missile Space Defence of Special Purpose (3-я Отдельная армия РКО особого назначения (3-я ОА РКО (ОН)) was reduced into the 1st Division for Early Warning Against Missile Attack (1-я Дивизию раннего предупреждения о ракетном нападении).

On 1 June 2001, the Missile and Space Defence Troops and the Military Space Troops were detached from the RVSN into the separate Space Troops directly under the General Staff. Colonel General Anatoly Perminov was appointed to lead the new Space Forces. He was succeeded by General Vladimir Popovkin in 2004 and General Oleg Ostapenko in 2008 until dissolution in 2011.

On 1 August 2015, the Space Forces were absorbed into the newly established Russian Aerospace Forces.

=== Within the Aerospace Forces (2015–present) ===
Following the 2015 merger, the Space Forces retained responsibility for launch operations at the Plesetsk Cosmodrome, on-orbit control of military spacecraft through the Titov Main Test and Control Centre at Krasnoznamensk, the space surveillance system (SKKP), and the space-based segment of the missile attack early warning system (SPRN). The Ministry of Defence announces launches but generally identifies payloads only as spacecraft launched in its interests, assigning them sequential Kosmos designations; their function is typically established afterwards from orbital data.

==== Early warning ====
Deployment of the space segment of the EKS ("Kupol") system began on 17 November 2015 with Kosmos-2510, the first Tundra-class satellite, followed by Kosmos-2518 in May 2017, Kosmos-2541 in September 2019, Kosmos-2546 in May 2020, Kosmos-2552 in November 2021 and Kosmos-2563 in November 2022. Unlike the earlier Oko satellites, the Tundra spacecraft operate in highly elliptical orbits with true look-down capability, allowing coverage north of the equator from a constellation smaller than the ten satellites originally specified.

The ground segment expanded in parallel. Voronezh-class radars, built to replace Soviet-era Daryal and Dnepr stations and restore coverage lost after 1991, entered combat duty at sites including Orenburg, Krasnoyarsk and Barnaul, and also support the Moscow missile defence system. Sergey Boev, general designer of the SPRN, stated in 2021 that the Lekhtusi, Krasnodar and Irkutsk stations would be modernised to increase transmitter power, throughput and jamming resistance, with work on the Irkutsk station scheduled for 2025–2028.

==== Reconnaissance, navigation and communications ====
Launches since 2015 have sustained the Bars-M optical mapping series (Kosmos-2515 in 2016 through Kosmos-2573 in December 2023), the Lotos-S1 electronic intelligence satellites and the Pion-NKS radar ocean reconnaissance satellite of the Liana system (first launched as Kosmos-2550 in June 2021), the Razbeg small optical reconnaissance satellites, and the Persona high-resolution imaging series. Since 2022 the Space Forces have also deployed small imaging satellites of the 14F178 type in groups of four aboard the Angara 1.2 launcher, including Kosmos-2591 to Kosmos-2594 in August 2025 and Kosmos-2615 to Kosmos-2618 on 23 April 2026, the latter placed in near-circular 322 × 338 km orbits at 96.65° inclination. GLONASS modernisation continued with the first GLONASS-K2 satellite launched as Kosmos-2569 in August 2023 and the second as Kosmos-2584 in March 2025, alongside Meridian-M and Rodnik communications launches.

==== Inspector satellites and counterspace systems ====
The Space Forces operate a series of manoeuvrable satellites associated with the 14F150 Nivelir programme, which Russia designates "satellite inspectors". Kosmos-2519, launched in June 2017, released a sub-satellite two months later. In November 2019 Kosmos-2542 was launched into the orbital plane of the National Reconnaissance Office optical reconnaissance satellite USA-245 and released Kosmos-2543, which manoeuvred to within tens of kilometres of it; in July 2020 Kosmos-2543 in turn released a high-velocity object, characterised by US and British officials as an anti-satellite technology test.

Three later missions followed the same profile: Kosmos-2558, launched 1 August 2022 into the plane of USA-326; Kosmos-2576, launched 17 May 2024 into the plane of USA-314; and Kosmos-2588, launched 23 May 2025 into the plane of USA-338. Each maintains altitude and inclination differences chosen so that its nodal precession rate matches that of its target, producing repeated close approaches — in the case of Kosmos-2588, to within roughly 94 km every four days. Kosmos-2558 released a second object in June 2025.

The Space Forces have also repeatedly tested the ground-launched Nudol direct-ascent anti-satellite system from Plesetsk. On 15 November 2021 a Nudol interceptor destroyed the defunct Soviet satellite Kosmos 1408, generating a large debris field in low Earth orbit.

== Structure ==
The main tasks of the Russian Space Forces are informing the higher political leaders and military commanders of missile attacks as soon as possible, ballistic missile defence, and the creation, deployment, maintenance and control of in-orbit space vehicles, like the new Persona reconnaissance satellite. For example, the Space Forces operate the GLONASS global positioning system. The commander of the Space Forces Colonel General Vladimir Popovkin said in January 2006 that 18 GLONASS satellites would be in orbit by 2008. In October 2010 the system became fully operational.

Formations of the Space Forces included the 3rd Missile-Space Defence Army, and a Division of Warning of Missile Attack, both with their headquarters at Solnechnogorsk near Moscow. Installations and assets include the Hantsavichy Radar Station in Belarus, along with a number of other large warning radars, and the A-135 anti-ballistic missile system which protects Moscow and the Peresvet anti-air laser combat system which protects strategic missiles.

There is an optical tracking facility, the Okno (Window) complex near the town of Nurek in central Tajikistan that is intended to monitor objects in space. The Okno is capable of tracking objects 40,000 kilometres (25,000 mi) from Earth, the space forces said when it °was put on duty in 2002. The facility involves telescope-like equipment housed in several large spheres, similar to the U.S. GEODSS system.

The 28th Arsenal (28-й арсенал КВ РФ) in Znamenka, Znamensky District, Tambov Oblast, ул. Рабочая, 2 Pervomaisky is affiliated with the Space Forces.

Lesser emblem of the Russian Space Forces

=== 3rd Missile-Space Defence Army, status in 2002 ===
1st Division of Warning of Missile Attack – HQ: Solnechnogorsk

East Oko Headquarters – Komsomolsk-na-Amure (Pivan-1)
West Oko Headquarters – Kurilovo (Serpukhov-15)
Radar Site (ORTU) RO-1 Olenegorsk – Radar Dnepr (Hen House)
Radar Site RO-5 – Beregovo, Ukraine – Radar Dnepr (Hen House, under Ukrainian control, all Ukrainian personnel)
Radar Site RO-4 – Sevastopol area, Ukraine – Radar Dnepr (Hen House, under Russian control, all Russian personnel)
Radar Site OS-2 – Balkhash, Kazakhstan – Radar Dnepr (Hen House)
Radar Site OS-1 – Mishelevka, Irkutsk – Radar Dnepr (Hen House)
Radar Site RO-30 – Pechora – Radar Daryal (Pechora)
Radar Site RO-7 – Gabala, Azerbaijan – Radar Daryal (Pechora)
Radar Site Gantcevichi, Belarus – Radar Volga
Radar Site – Komsomolsk-na-Amure – Radar Duga-2 (Steel Yard)
Radar Site Sofrino, in common with PRO – Radar Don-2 (Pill Box)

9th Division of Defence Against Missiles (ru:9-я дивизия ПРО) – HQ: Sofrino (A-135 anti-ballistic missile system)

Missile Site – Novopetrovska – 51Т6
Missile Site – Klin – 51Т6
Missile Site – Shodna – 53Т6
Missile Site – Turakovo (Aleksandrov) – 51Т6
Missile Site – Korolev – 53Т6
Missile Site – Litkarino – 53Т6
Missile Site – Vnukovo – 53Т6
Missile Site – Kolodkino – 51Т6
Radar Site – Sofrino – Radar Don-2N (Pill Box)
Radar Site – Stremilovo (Chekhov-7) – Radar Dunay-3U (Cat House)
Radar Site – Kubinka – Radar Dunay-M (Dog House)

45th Division of Space Control – HQ: Noginsk area

Optical Electronic Complex Okno (Window) – Object 7680 – Nurek, Tajikistan
Laser Radar Krona ОРТУ – Zelenchukskaya, Cherkessk Area
Also are used Radar Site Sofrino, Balkhash, Mishelevka

=== 2018 ===
- 15th Aerospace Forces Army

- Titov Main Test and Space Systems Control Centre
- Main Centre for Missile Attack Warning
- Main Space Intelligence Centre

- Plesetsk Cosmodrome

== Ranks and rank insignia ==
Officer ranks

Rank group	General / flag officers				Senior officers			Junior officers
Russian Aerospace Forces
Russian Aerospace Forces	Генера́л а́рмии Generál ármii	Генера́л-полко́вник; Generál-polkóvnik	Генера́л-лейтена́нт; Generál-leytenánt	Генера́л-майо́р; Generál-mayór	Полко́вник; Polkóvnik	Подполко́вник; Podpolkóvnik	Майо́р; Majór	Kапита́н; Kapitán	Старший лейтена́нт Stárshiy leytenánt	Лейтенант; Leytenant	Mла́дший лейтена́нт Mládshiy leytenánt

Other ranks

Rank group	Under-officers		NCOs				Enlisted
Russian Aerospace Forces
Russian Aerospace Forces	Ста́рший пра́порщик Stárshiy práporshchik	Пра́порщик; Práporshchyk	Старшина́ Starshyná	Ста́рший сержа́нт Stárshiy serzhánt	Сержа́нт; Serzhánt	Мла́дший сержа́нт Mládshiy serzhánt	Ефре́йтор; Efréĭtor	Рядово́й; Ryadovóy

== Commanders ==
No.	Picture	Commander	Took office	Left office	Time in office	Ref.
1	Kerim Kerimov	Lieutenant General; Kerim Kerimov (1917–2003)	1964	1965	0–1 years	–
2	Andrei Karas [ru]	Colonel General; Andrei Karas (1918–1979)	1965	1979	13–14 years	–
3	Aleksandr Maksimov [ru]	Colonel General; Aleksandr Maksimov (1923–1990)	1979	1989	9–10 years	–
4	Vladimir Ivanov [ru]	Colonel General; Vladimir Ivanov (born 1936)	1989	1996	6–7 years	–
5	Anatoly Perminov	Colonel General; Anatoly Perminov (born 1945)	28 March 2001	10 March 2004	2 years	–
6	Vladimir Popovkin	Colonel General; Vladimir Popovkin (1957–2014)	10 March 2004	30 June 2008	4 years	–
7	Oleg Ostapenko	Colonel General; Oleg Ostapenko (born 1957)	30 June 2008	1 December 2011	3 years	–
–	Vladimir M. Ivanov	Vladimir M. Ivanov (born 1957); Acting	2012	2012	0 years	–
8	Aleksandr Golovko	Colonel General; Aleksandr Golovko (born 1964)	1 August 2015	Incumbent	11 years	–

== See also ==
- Air Force Space Command
- Awards and emblems of the Ministry of Defence of the Russian Federation
- People's Liberation Army Strategic Support Force
- United States Space Command
- United States Space Force
