= Aleksandr Golovko =

Russian military general

Colonel General Aleksandr Golovko
- Олександр Валентинович Головко
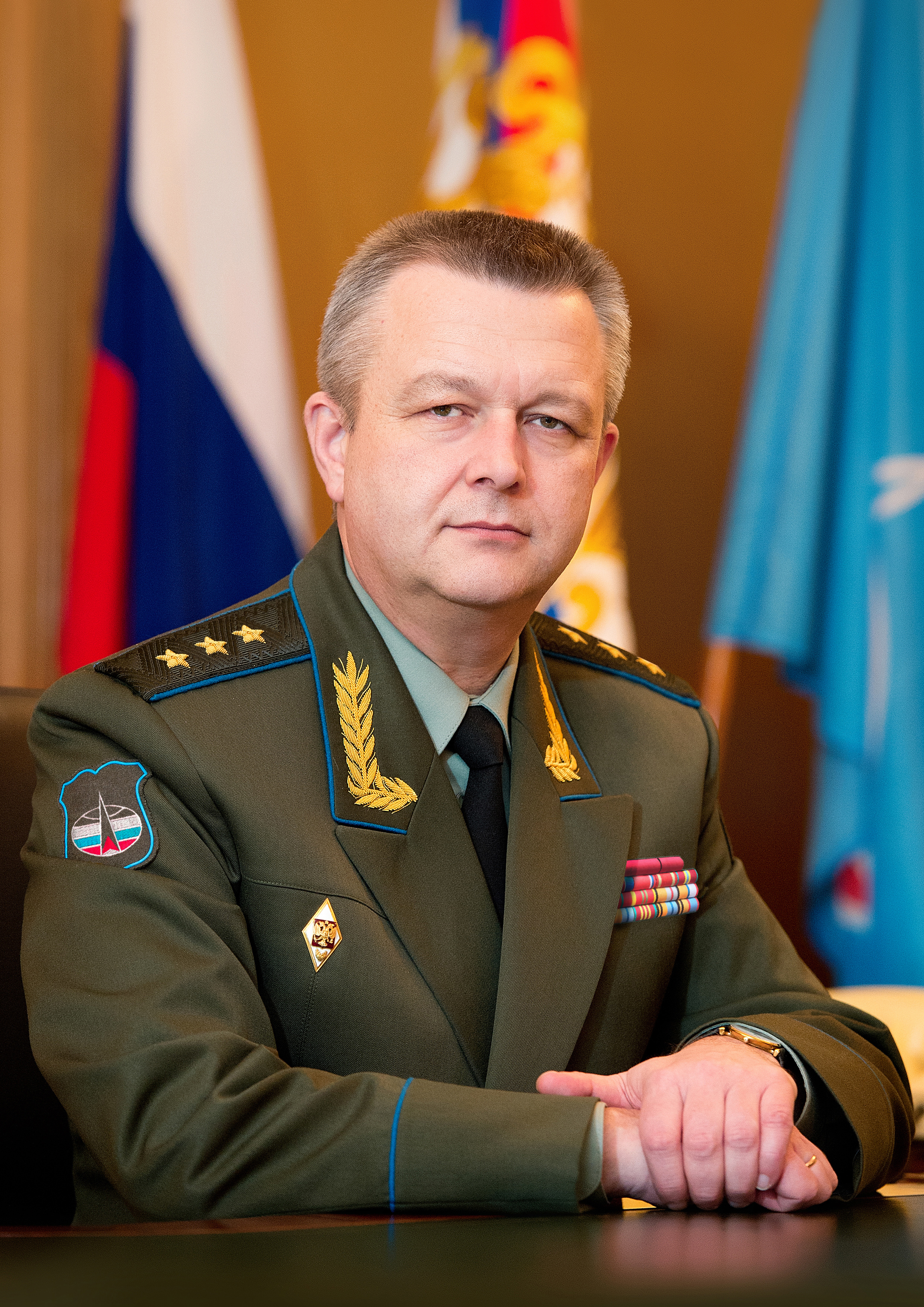
- Golovko in 2017
- Born: 29 January 1964 (age 62); Dnepropetrovsk, Ukrainian SSR, Soviet Union (now Dnipro, Ukraine)
- Military career
- Allegiance: Russia
- Branch: Russian Space Force
- Service years: 1981–present
- Rank: Colonel general
- Commands: Aerospace Defence Forces; Plesetsk Cosmodrome; Titov Main Test and Space Systems Control Centre

Aleksandr Valentinovich Golovko (Russian: Александр Валентинович Головко, Ukrainian: Олександр Валентинович Головко; born 29 January 1964) is a Russian colonel general in the Russian military and commander of the Russian Space Forces since 1 August 2015.

Between 24 December 2012 until 31 July 2015 he was the Commander of the Aerospace Defence Forces.

== Early life and education ==
Golovko is of Ukrainian descent and was born in the Ukrainian SSR in 1964. He joined the Soviet military and graduated from Marshal Leonid Govorov Air Defence and Radio Engineering Academy in 1986. After graduation he served in the Titov Main Test and Space Systems Control Centre in the Soviet and Russian Space Forces.

== Career ==
In 2003 he became Deputy Chief of Staff of the Russian Space Forces and then returned to the Titov Main Test and Space Systems Control Centre as Chief of Staff from 2004 to 2007, and Commander from 2007 to 2011. From June 2011 to December 2012 he was the commander of Plesetsk Cosmodrome and was then appointed as head of the Aerospace Defence Forces, replacing Oleg Ostapenko, who had been promoted to Deputy Defence Minister.

He commanded the Russian Aerospace Defense Forces from 2012 until August 2015 before he was appointed as commander of the reestablished Russian Space Forces on the same day.

Military offices
Preceded by Oleg Ostapenko	Commander of the Russian Aerospace Defence Forces; 2012–2015	Service abolished
New creation	Commander of the Russian Space Forces; 2015–present	Incumbent
