= Oleg Ostapenko =

Russian general and former Space Forces commander

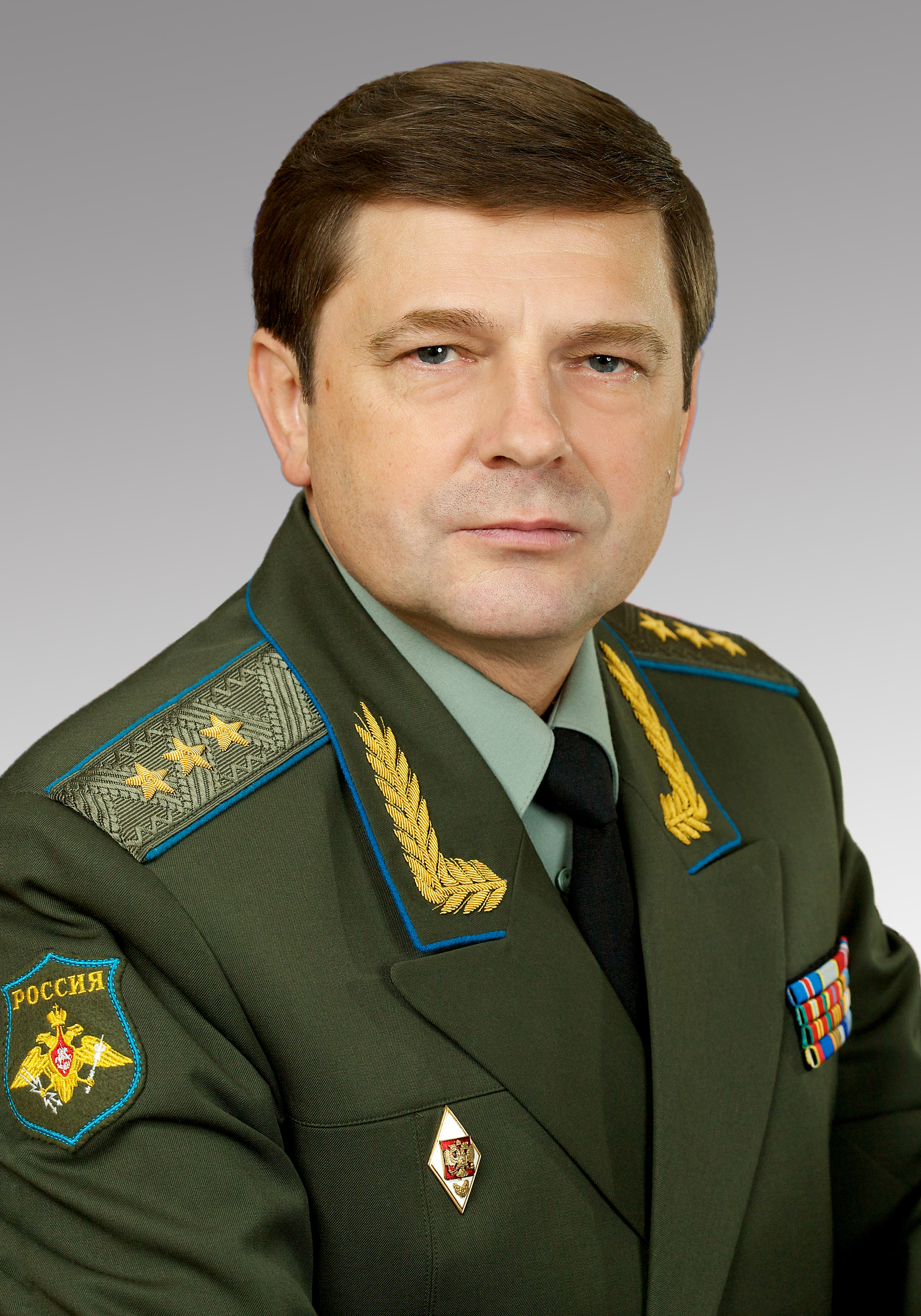
- Official portrait, 2012
- Born: 3 May 1957 (age 69); Pokoshychi, Chernihiv Oblast, Ukraine
- Military career
- Allegiance: Russia
- Branch: Space Forces
- Service years: 1979–2013
- Rank: Colonel General
- Commands: Aerospace Defence Forces; Space Forces; Plesetsk Cosmodrome
- Awards: Order of Military Merit
- Other work: General Director of the Roscosmos

Oleg Nikolayevich Ostapenko (Russian: Олег Николаевич Остапенко, Ukrainian: Олег Миколайович Остапенко, born 3 May 1957) is the former director of Roscosmos, the federal space agency, retired Colonel General in the Armed Forces of the Russian Federation, former Deputy Minister of Defence, and former commander of the Aerospace Defence Forces, a position he held from their foundation on 1 December 2011 until his promotion in November 2012. Prior to this he was commander of the Russian Space Forces from 2008, replacing Vladimir Popovkin.

Ostapenko joined the Soviet Strategic Rocket Forces in 1979 after graduating from the Felix Dzerzhinsky Military Academy, specialising in 'Strategic Missiles, Engines, and Production Equipment'. He undertook higher military studies, ending in 1992 and moved into the Ministry of Defence Space Units. He held a number of roles at Titov Main Test and Space Systems Control Centre ending with being Chief of Staff from 2002 to 2004.

In 2004, he was promoted to be First Deputy Chief of Staff of the Russian Space Forces and after undertaking a PhD in military sciences he became the commander of Plesetsk Cosmodrome in 2007. A year later on 30 June 2008 he was promoted to be commander of the Russian Space Forces replacing Vladimir Popovkin who became a Deputy Defence Minister. He was commander of the Aerospace Defence Forces from 1 December 2011 to 9 November 2012 and was promoted to the rank of Colonel General on 9 August 2012.

On 9 November 2012, he was appointed as a Deputy Minister of Defence and relieved of his command of the Aerospace Defence Forces.

On 10 October 2013, Ostanpenko was discharged from military service and relieved of his post in order to become the General Director of the Russian Federal Space Agency, which would be renamed Roscosmos during his tenure. On 21 January 2015, Ostapenko was dismissed from Roscosmos.

== Military education ==
General Ostapenko earned PhD in Military Sciences in 2007

- Graduated from F. Dzerzhinsky Military College, 1979
- Graduate from the Command Faculty of F. Dzerzhinsky Military College, 1992
- Completed his specialty studies by graduating from the General Staff Academy of the Armed Forces of the Russian Federation, 2007

Military offices
Preceded by Vladimir Popovkin	Commander-in-Chief of the Russian Space Forces; 2008–2011	Service abolished
New creation	Commander-in-Chief of the Russian Aerospace Defence Forces; 2011–2012	Succeeded by Aleksandr Golovko
