= Krasnoznamensk =

Krasnoznamensk (Russian: Краснознаменск) is the name of several urban localities in Russia:

- Krasnoznamensk, Kaliningrad Oblast, a town in Krasnoznamensky District of Kaliningrad Oblast
- Krasnoznamensk, Moscow Oblast, a closed town in Moscow Oblast; 55°35′N 37°3′E

== See also ==
- Krasnoznamensky (rural locality)
