= Krona space object recognition station =

Russian space surveillance station

Krona
- Крона
- Russia
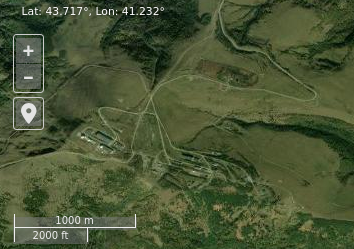
- Satellite imagery of Krona space object recognition station

Site information
- Type: Space surveillance base
- Owner: Russian Aerospace Forces
- Controlled by: Russian Space Forces

Location
- Krona in Zelenchukskaya
- Coordinates: 43.716917°N 41.231688°E

Site history
- Built: 1999

Krona space object recognition station (Russian: Радиооптический комплекс распознавания космических объектов «Крона», romanized: Radiooptichesky Kompleks raspoznavaniya kosmicheskikh obektov "Krona") is a Russian military complex which is used to identify objects (artificial satellites) in outer space using telescopes and radar.

== Space surveillance base ==
It is part of the Centre for Outer Space Monitoring of the Russian Space Forces. The first Krona is near the village of Zelenchukskaya in Karachay-Cherkessia, North Caucasus. There is another under construction in the Russian Far East called Krona-N, near Nakhodka in Primorsky Krai. In 2007, the then commander of the Russian Space Forces Vladimir Popovkin said that the Nakhodka Krona would start in 2008, however there were no subsequent announcements.

The Caucasian Krona consists of two complexes - an optical one located on Chapal mountain (43.7169171°N 41.2316883°E) above 2,000 metres and a radar installation 30 km away at a height of 1,300 metres (43°49′34″N 41°20′35″E). One site for the Nakhodka Krona is 42°56′8.52″N 132°34′36.37″E, and this site does not have an optical component.

== History ==
Krona was planned in the 1970s and onsite construction started in 1984. Testing started in 1994 and the site was operational in 1999. A laser optical locator (lidar) was added in 2005. The original plan was for three sites - Zelenchukskaya, Nakhodka and another in the Pamir Mountains, the area Okno was built. The name krona (meaning 'crown') came from the appearance of the UHF band antenna which looked like a tree (krona dereva).

== Facilities ==
The Caucasian Krona radar works in both the centimeter and decimeter bands. The UHF antenna is 20m x 20m and the SHF one consists of 5 rotating parabolic antennas which uses interferometry. According to a 2007 television programme the UHF radar first discovers an object and discerns its orbit and characteristics. Then further detail and precise coordinates are discovered using the SHF radar. The lidar then targets the object and reflected light is picked up by the telescope.
