= Okno =

Russian space surveillance station

Okno
- Norak, Tajikistan
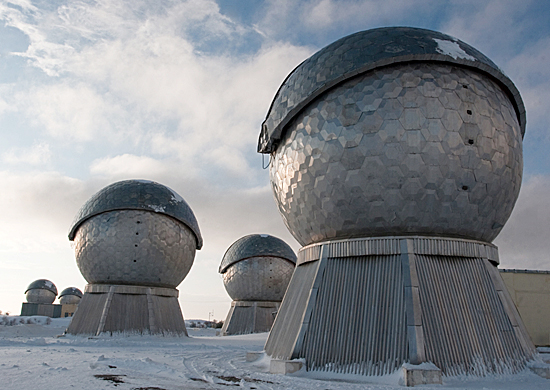
- Okno telescopes

Site information
- Type: Space surveillance facility
- Owner: Russia
- Controlled by: Russian Space Forces
- Open to the public: No
- Condition: Operational

Location
- Okno in Tajikistan
- Location within Tajikistan
- Coordinates: 38.281°N 69.225°E

Site history
- Built: 1999
- Built by: Soviet Union/Russia

Okno (Russian: Окно literally "window", stands for "Оптический контроль небесной области", "Optical control of the celestial region") is a Russian space surveillance station located in Tajikistan. It is run by the Russian Space Forces and is part of the Centre for Outer Space Monitoring. It is located 2,216 metres (7,270 ft) above sea level on the Sanglok mountain in Pamirs, an area with clear night skies. Its personnel is stationed in Norak. It is also known as Оптико-электронный комплекс "Нурек".

The facility consists of a number of telescopes in domes and is similar to the US GEODSS system. It is designed for the detection and analysis of space objects such as satellites. The designers were awarded a Russian state prize for science and technology in 2004.

== History ==
The Okno facility was started by the Soviet Union in 1979 using the personnel of military construction battalion No. 14464. All construction stopped in 1992 due to the civil war in Tajikistan and the centre started test operations in 1999 and combat duty in 2004. Ownership of the complex was transferred from Tajikistan to Russia in 2004 in return for the writing off of $242 million USD of Tajikistan's US$299 million debt to Russia.

A Russian-operated space surveillance system located in Tajikistan, Okno-M, has reached its full capacity, making it four times more powerful, the Russian Ministry of Defense reports in July 2015. The surveillance station successfully underwent state tests late in 2014.

When it was built it was believed by some in the west to be a military anti-satellite laser facility rather than one for optical tracking. In 1987 John E. Pike of the Federation of American Scientists was quoted as saying "Whether or not this facility will be capable of shooting down satellites or 'Star Wars,' it most certainly is developing the kind of technology that would eventually be able to do so."

== Function ==
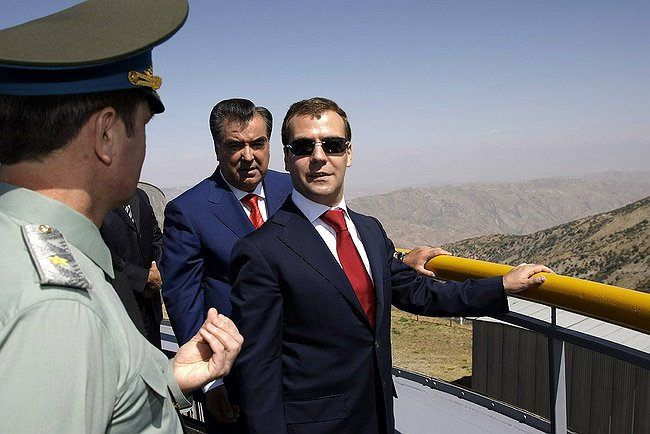
Russian President Dmitry Medvedev with Tajik President Emomali Rahmon and Space Forces commander Oleg Ostapenko, Okno, July 2009

Okno is a facility for tracking and monitoring man-made space objects. The Russian military claims that it automatically detects objects at altitudes up to 40,000 kilometres (25,000 mi). This is above low Earth orbit and includes satellites in medium Earth orbit, geostationary orbit and some in high Earth orbit. It only works at night and works passively by picking up reflected sunlight off objects. After 2014 modernization its range was increased to 50,000 km.

== See also ==
- Sanglok observatory
- Okno-S, another facility, in the Russian Far East.
