= Main Centre for Reconnaissance of Situation in Space =

Russian military space surveillance headquarters

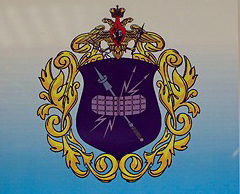
821st Main Centre for Reconnaissance of Situation in Space
- Главный центр разведки космической обстановки
- Part of Russian Space Forces
- Noginsk-9

Location
- Noginsk within Moscow Oblast
- Location within Moscow Oblast
- Coordinates: 56.077352°N 38.505063°E

Site history
- Built: 1971

The 821st Main Centre for Reconnaissance of Situation in Space (Russian: Главный центр разведки космической обстановки, romanized: GTsRKO) is the headquarters of the Russian military's space surveillance network, SKKP. (Note: Most Russian sources, including those in English use SKKP. Some sources use Russian Space Surveillance System, SSS.) The centre is part of the Russian Space Forces and receives intelligence from a network of reporting stations which includes the Russian missile attack early warning network as well as some stations only used for space surveillance such as Okno and Krona.

The purpose of the SKKP is to detect satellites, identify them and to discern their orbits. It maintains the Russian catalogue of space objects and provides data which could be used to support space launches, feed an anti-satellite programme and provide intelligence on hostile military satellites. It is the Russian equivalent of the United States Space Surveillance Network.

== History ==
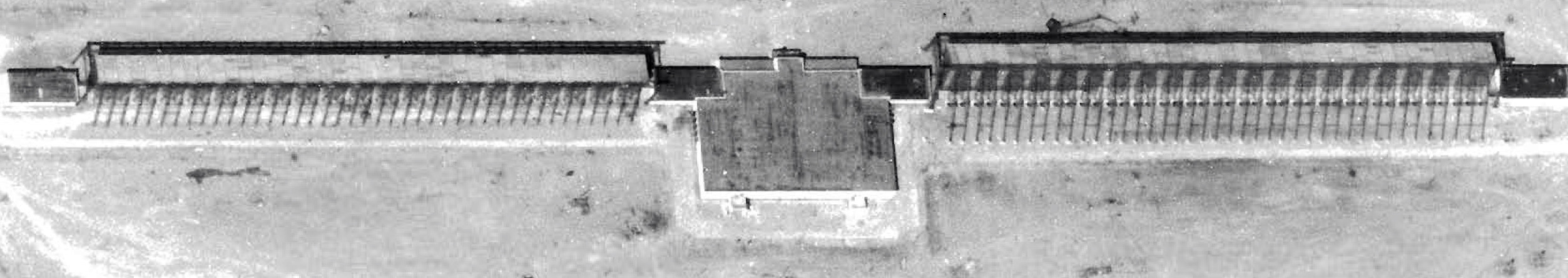
One of the four space surveillance radars at Balkhash, 1967

The centre is based in the military village of Noginsk-9 (Russian: Ногинск-9) about a kilometre to the south-west of the village of Dubrovo near Noginsk in Moscow Oblast. It was previously known as TsKKP (Цккп) from Russian: Центр контроля космического пространства, romanized: Tsentr kontrolya kosmicheskogo prostranstva meaning 'centre for space monitoring'.

The idea of a space monitoring system originated in 1963 and the design was agreed upon in 1965. From the beginning it included civilian astronomical stations run by the Soviet Academy of Sciences. The system needed to detect, identify and track satellites and create a satellite catalogue. The first satellite detection system consisted of eight Dnestr radars, four at Mishelevka in Siberia and four at Balkhash in the Kazakh SSR which provided information for the Istrebitel Sputnikov anti-satellite system.

Construction on the centre began in 1965 and in 1968 a 5E51 computer was installed. The first part of the centre was placed on alert in 1970 and became operational in 1972, as part of the Soviet Air Defences.

In 1974 plans to link up the space surveillance centre with the missile warning centre and missile defence radars were realised. There were several problems with this. One significant issue was that they used different co-ordinate systems. A drawback of linking the early warning radars to the space surveillance centre was that it caused data on thousands of routine objects to be sent to the centre, overwhelming it with data.

To counter this, a programme called "Kosmos" was implemented. This programme asked the radar stations only to send information on requested objects and launches rather than everything they identified. One concern raised with "Kosmos" was that it took the radar stations two to three minutes to do this, which disrupted their tracking of ballistic missiles. It was important that the system concentrated on the military satellites of hostile countries and filtered these out from the noise of the wider space environment.

The early warning radars could only cover satellites in low earth orbits. In the 1980s more US military satellites were placed in geosynchronous orbits. This required specialised equipment, such as Krona and Okno, which could analyse satellites at that height. In the late 1980s the centre received a new building housing an Elbrus-2 computer. Later a new network based on the Elbrus-90 Microcomputer was installed.

The space monitoring centre was awarded the Soviet Minister of Defence Pennant for Courage and Military Valour.

In 2003 a notification system for detecting "special spacecraft" passing over the country was implemented.

Russian space surveillance stations in June 2012

== Catalogue ==
The centre maintains the Russian catalogue of space objects, similar to that of NORAD. The radar stations send the centre a six-dimensional vector consisting of co-ordinates and velocities taken from the smoothing of discrete measurements. This data consists of range, azimuth and elevation angle, and in addition some radars send radial velocity.

The centre compares the measurements to the catalogue to see whether it is a known object. If not, additional data is collected to see if the signal represents a new orbit of a known object. If it is not, then a new object is catalogued.

== Structure ==
The space surveillance network was part of the Soviet Air Defence Forces (the Protivo-Vozdushnaya Oborona (PVO)) and was incorporated as part of the missile defence and space defence force. In 1998 SKKP became part of the missile and space defence organisation ракетно-космической обороны (RKO) together with missile warning network SPRN and the anti-missile forces. In 2001 these services became part of the newly founded Space Troops and were incorporated as the 3rd Independent Missile and Space Defence Army.

The Main Centre for Reconnaissance of Situation in Space was formed on 1 December 2009 and since December 2011 it had been part of the Space Command of the Russian Aerospace Defence Forces, together with facilities such as the 820th Main Centre for Missile Attack Warning and 153rd Titov Main Space Testing Centre.

== See also ==
- Joint CIS Air Defence System
