= Krasnoznamensk, Moscow Oblast =

Town in Moscow Oblast, Russia

Krasnoznamensk Краснознаменск
- Town
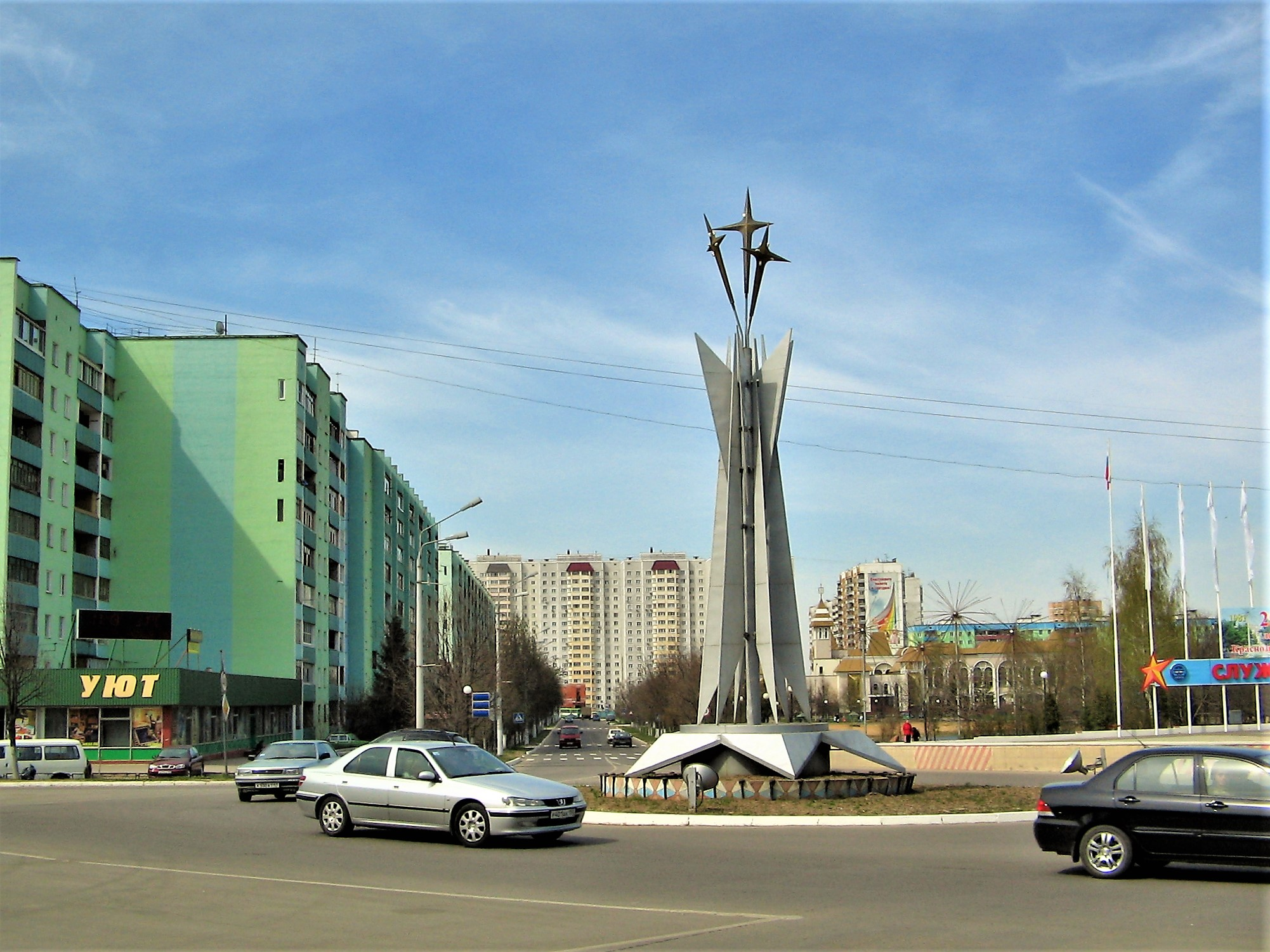
- Entrance to Krasnoznamensk

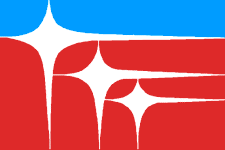
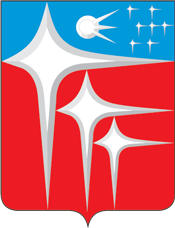
- Flag Coat of arms
- Interactive map of Krasnoznamensk
- Location of Krasnoznamensk Krasnoznamensk (Moscow Oblast)
- Coordinates: 55°36′03″N 37°02′09″E
- Country: Russia
- Federal subject: Moscow Oblast
- Founded: 1950
- Town status since: 1981

Government
  - Body: City Duma
  - Head: Yury Kovtun

Area
  - Total: 5.8 km^{2} (2.2 sq mi)
- Elevation: 200 m (660 ft)

Population (2010 Census)
  - Total: 36,103
  - Estimate (2025): 44,687 (+23.8%)
  - Density: 6,200/km^{2} (16,000/sq mi)

Administrative status
  - Subordinated to: closed administrative-territorial formation of Krasnoznamensk
  - Capital of: closed administrative-territorial formation of Krasnoznamensk

Municipal status
  - Urban okrug: Krasnoznamensk Urban Okrug
  - Capital of: Krasnoznamensk Urban Okrug
- Time zone: UTC+3 (MSK)
- Postal code: 143090
- Dialing code: +7 49633
- OKTMO ID: 46706000001
- Website: krasnoznamensk.com

Krasnoznamensk (Russian: Краснозна́менск) is a closed town in Moscow Oblast, Russia. Population: 43,868 (2021 census); 36,103 (2010 census); 28,044 (2002 census). It was previously known as Golitsyno-2 (until 1994).

== History ==
It was granted town status in 1981. It was known until 1994 as Golitsyno-2 (Голицыно-2).

== Administrative and municipal status ==
Within the framework of administrative divisions, it is incorporated as the closed administrative-territorial formation of Krasnoznamensk—an administrative unit with the status equal to that of the districts. As a municipal division, the closed administrative-territorial formation of Krasnoznamensk is incorporated as Krasnoznamensk Urban Okrug.

== Military ==
The town hosts a reserve mission control center and a primary mission control center for military satellites, the Titov Main Test and Space Systems Control Center (compare the United States' Joint Functional Component Command for Space and Global Strike), which is reflected in its coat of arms.

== Notable people ==
- Irina Toneva (born 1977), singer
