= Titov Main Test and Space Systems Control Centre =

Titov Main Test and Space Systems Control Centre
- Glavny Ispytatelny Tsentr Ispytany i Upravleniya Kosmicheskimi Sredstvami (GITSIU COP)
- Krasnoznamensk in Russia

Site information
- Type: Satellite Control Centre
- Owner: Russian Aerospace Forces
- Controlled by: Russian Space Forces
- Condition: Operational

Location
- Coordinates: 55.594°N 37.047°E

Site history
- Built: 1957
- Events: Orbital station Mir

The Titov Main Test and Space Systems Control Centre (Russian: Главный испытательный центр испытаний и управления космическими средствами (ГИЦИУ КС), romanized: Glavny Ispytatelny Tsentr Ispytany i Upravleniya Kosmicheskimi Sredstvami (GITSIU COP)) (also referenced as the Titov Space Control Centre and Titov Space Centre) is the main Russian military and commercial satellite control centre. It is run by the Russian Space Forces of the Russian Aerospace Forces. Located roughly 40 kilometres (25 mi) southwest of Moscow in closed town of Krasnoznamensk, the centre was built in 1957 as part of the Soviet space program, and was known by the name of Golitsyno-2.

== History ==
A resolution of the Council of Ministers of 30 January 1956 provided for the establishment of a command and control complex for the first flight satellites. Work on the construction of the centre began on May 8, 1957. GITSIU COP and subordinate military units together with the Mission Control Centre support the entire space programme. The military is responsible for the condition of many domestic orbital systems — military, scientific, manned and other. Specialists at the main centre started working with the first launches, first artificial satellite, the first manned flight into space. They also worked on Soviet Moonwalkers (lunokhody), and on the programme for the orbital station Mir, right up until the last seconds of its existence. Now among their many tasks is work with the International Space Station.

== Centre ==
Currently the Centre manages 75% of the domestic Russian orbital spacecraft constellation. By order of the Russian president on 14 August 2001, the centre was named after Gherman Titov, to honour the second human to orbit the Earth, who had been one of the leaders of the Centre.

The centre has locations throughout Russia involved in testing, measuring and certifying equipment which are subordinated to the main centre.

== See also ==
- Plesetsk Cosmodrome
- Kapustin Yar
