= Main Centre for Missile Attack Warning =

Russian missile early warning centre

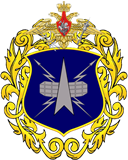
820th Main Centre for Missile Attack Warning
- Главный центр предупреждения о ракетном нападении
- Part of Russian Space Forces
- Solnechnogorsk-7

Site information
- Owner: Russian Aerospace Forces
- Controlled by: Russian Space Forces

Location
- Solnechnogorsk within Moscow Oblast
- Coordinates: 56.241389°N 37.013889°E

Site history
- Built: 1971

Garrison information
- Current commander: Major general Suchkov S.V.

The 820th Main Centre for Missile Attack Warning (Russian: Главный центр предупреждения о ракетном нападении (Гцпрн), romanized: GTsPRN) is the Russian Space Forces early warning network against ballistic missile attack. It has headquarters in the village of Timonovo near Solnechnogorsk outside Moscow and is part of the Russian Space Forces of the Aerospace Forces. The centre consists of a network of early warning radar stations which transmit their data to the control centre near Solnechnogorsk. Other information comes from the early warning Oko and EKS satellites as well as the Don-2N missile defence radar. Information from the centre could be used for a launch on warning nuclear missile attack or to engage the A-135 anti-ballistic missile system.

== The Main Centre ==
The centre is the control centre for the radar network. Here signals from every station are received and, if necessary, a message can be sent to the presidential 'nuclear briefcase' for authorisation to use nuclear weapons. There is a communications centre which has a number of backup channels to communicate with each radar station. If a ballistic missile attack is discovered the duty commander reports this to the central command post of the General Staff. At the same time the duty engineer reports it to the commander of the Aerospace Defence Forces, for redundancy.

Information comes from the radar network, early warning satellites and the space surveillance network SKKP. The centre also discovers and monitors space objects through the use of radar which are fed into the SKKP network.

== Warning network ==
Early warning radar network in 1980

The Russian missile warning system originates in the Soviet Union and is often known by its Soviet initials SPRN (СПРН), from Russian: Система предупреждения о ракетном нападении, romanized: Sistema preduprezhdeniya o raketnom napadenii 'Missile attack warning system'. It started on 15 February 1971 as two Dnestr-M radars at Olenegorsk and Skrunda with a command post in Solnechnogorsk. It expanded by the addition of Dnestr-M radars in Mishelevka and Balkhash in 1973, a Dnepr radar in Sevastopol in 1975 and another in Mukachevo in 1977. The Daugava radar, a Daryal receiver, started operations in 1975 at Olenegorsk. In 1978 an upgraded warning system called Крокус (Krokus) was introduced.

In 1982 the Oko early warning satellite system became operational. It was joined in 1984 by the first Daryal radar in Pechora and in 1985 by the Daryal in Gabala.

Early warning radar network in 1990

The 1972 Anti-ballistic missile treaty requires that early warning radar stations are located on the periphery of national territory and face outwards. When the Soviet Union collapsed in 1991 this resulted in many of the stations ending up in newly independent states. The radar station at Skrunda, now in Latvia, closed in 1998. Other stations now overseas were Sevastopol and Mukachevo (both in Ukraine), Balkhash (Kazakhstan) and Gabala (Azerbaijan).

The Volga radar at Baranavichy in Belarus came online in 2003 and the two Ukrainian radars closed in 2009. In the mid-2000s Russia started the roll out of the next generation of early warning radar, the Voronezh. The first station in Lekhtusi near St Petersburg went on combat duty in 2012. Other stations in Kaliningrad and Armavir were made operational in the following years. In 2012, the Gabala Radar Station in Azerbaijan was dismantled following failure to renegotiate its continued use. The Russian military has expressed a desire to replace or replicate all overseas radars with domestic stations as overseas ones cannot be relied upon in times of tension and war. New stations were commissioned in locations such as Barnaul, Orsk, Orenburg and Yeniseysk.

On 4 October 2019, Sergei Boyev, director general of Vympel NPO, a major weapons manufacturer in Russia, confirmed to Russia's state-run media that the company was working on "modelling" the system for China. Russia hopes to integrate China's early warning system with Russia's. This will provide China with increased detection range from North pole as well as the Atlantic and Pacific Ocean.

Early warning radar network in June 2012
Early warning radar network in May 2025

== Organisational structure ==
In 1998 SPRN became part of the missile and space defence organisation ракетно-космической обороны (RKO) together with SKKP and the anti-missile troops. In 2001 these services became part of the newly founded Space Troops, and were incorporated as the 3rd Independent Missile and Space Defense Army.

The Main Centre for Missile Attack Warning was formed on 1 December 2009 and since December 2011 it had been part of the Space Command of the Russian Aerospace Defence Forces, together with facilities such as the 821st Main Space Intelligence Centre and 153rd Titov Main Space Testing Centre.

As of May 2025 Main Center consists of the following active units:

Number	Unit emblem	Picture	Unit Name	Location	Description
1	GCPRN		Unit 26302. 820th Main Center of the Missile Attack Warning system	Solnechnogorsk-7	Divisional HQ. Main Center commands and controls all other units.
2			Unit 12556. 514th Command Post of the Missile Attack Warning system	Solnechnogorsk-7	A control center that receives, processes and analyzes information about ballistic missile launches from all other units and determines the start of an enemy missile attack
3			Unit 17204. 1383rd Reserve Command Post of the Missile Attack Warning system	Kolomna-1	Reserve Command Post of the Missile Attack Warning system
4			Unit 03340. 916th Separate Radio Engineering Node	Serpuhov-15	Western control center for US-KS, US-KMO and EKS "Kupol" satellites
5			Unit 20117. 1127th Separate Radio Engineering Node	Pivan-1? Gaiter-9?	Eastern control center for US-KS, US-KMO and EKS "Kupol" satellites
6		Olenegorsk radar station from space	Unit 16605. 57th Separate Radio Engineering Node	Olenegorsk-1	Dnestr-M Early warning radar, being replaced by Voronezh
7		Daryal radar in Pechora	Unit 96876. 376th Separate Radio Engineering Node	Pechora-8	Daryal Early warning radar
8			Unit 03522. 474th Separate Radio Engineering Node	Klyetsk-2	Volga Early warning radar
9		Voronezh-M early warning radar	Unit 73845. 571st Separate Radio Engineering Node	Lekhtusi	Voronezh-M Early warning radar
10		Armavir Radar Station from space	Unit 41003. 818th Separate Radio Engineering Node	Armavir-18	Voronezh-DM Early warning radar
11		Voronezh-DM radar near Kaliningrad	Unit 42988. ? Separate Radio Engineering Node	"Pionersky"	Voronezh-DM Early warning radar
12			Unit 03908. 36th Separate Radio Engineering Node	Usolye-Sibirskoye-7	Voronezh-VP Early warning radar. Previously Dnestr, Dnestr-M and Dnepr radars.
13			Unit 84685. ? Separate Radio Engineering Node	Yeniseysk	Voronezh-DM Early warning radar
14			Unit 84686. 314th Separate Radio Engineering Node	Barnaul	Voronezh-DM Early warning radar
15			Unit 84194. 541st Separate Radio Engineering Node	Orsk	Voronezh-M Early warning radar
16			Unit 84197. ? Separate Radio Engineering Node	Vorkuta	Voronezh-SM-M Early warning radar

There are a number of Radar sites that are out of Use:

Defunct sites
Number	Unit emblem	Picture	Unit Name	Location	Dates of Operation	Description
1	No unit emblem exists		Unit 18951.129th Separate Radio Engineering Node	Skrunda-1	15 February 1971 - 31 August 1998	Former site with Dnestr-M radar and Daryal type radar (unfinished).
2			Unit 16601. 49th Separate Radio Engineering Node	Balkhash-9	1971 - 1 June 2020	Former site with Dnepr, Dnestr, Dnestr-M radars and Daryal type radar (unfinished).
3	No unit emblem exists		Unit 03864. 808th Separate Radio Engineering Node	Sevastopol	16 January 1979 - 26 February 2009	Former site with Dnepr radar. As of 2025 new Voronezh radar being built on Site.
4	No unit emblem exists		Unit 30767. 1056th Separate Radio Engineering Node	Mukachevo-12	16 January 1979 - 26 February 2009	Former site with Dnepr radar and Daryal type radar (unfinished)
5			Unit 30765. 428th Separate Radio Engineering Node	Gabala-2	19 February 1985 - 9 December 2012	Former site with Daryal radar
