= Joint CIS Air Defense System =

Unified air defence of the ex-Soviet Republics

Joint CIS Air Defense System (Russian: Объединённая система ПВО СНГ) is a unified system that comprises air defense units and elements of the former Soviet republics under control of the Coordination Committee on Air Defense of the Council of Ministers of Defense of the CIS. Currently there are 6 de facto members of JADS: Armenia, Belarus, Kazakhstan, Kyrgyzstan, Russia and Tajikistan. 70% of all expenditures of the military budget of the Commonwealth of Independent States are directed to the improvement and development of this system.

== History ==
It was established on 10 February 1995 by the Almaty agreement. Which was signed by Armenia, Belarus, Kazakhstan, Kyrgyzstan, Russia, Tajikistan, Georgia, Turkmenistan, Ukraine and Uzbekistan. Georgia and Turkmenistan ceased their membership in 1997, while Uzbekistan is maintaining cooperation with Russia on a bilateral basis. By decision of the Council of CIS Heads of Governments of November 3, 1995, an effective financing mechanism for the CIS air defense system was created from a targeted allocation of funds by participating states. Since September 1996, combat firing has been conducted by CIS air defense units. In September 1998, the first joint tactical exercises of the system "Combat Commonwealth – 98" were held. Such exercises have become traditional and are held once every two years.

== Functions ==
General aims of Joint AD System are the following:

- Protection of air boundaries of the CIS member states;
- Joint control of the CIS airspace;
- Monitoring of aerospace posture;
- Air/missile strike early warning and coordinated response to it.

== Command structure ==
The Joint CIS AD System does not have a single commander. It is controlled by the Air Defense Coordinating Committee of the CIS whose members are commanders of air defense troops or air forces of the member states. The Chairman of the Committee at the time of formation was Commander-in-Chief of the Russian Air Force Colonel-General Alexander Zelin. Currently, the chairman is the former Commander-in-Chief of the Russian Aerospace Forces, Colonel-General Sergei Surovikin.

== Composition ==
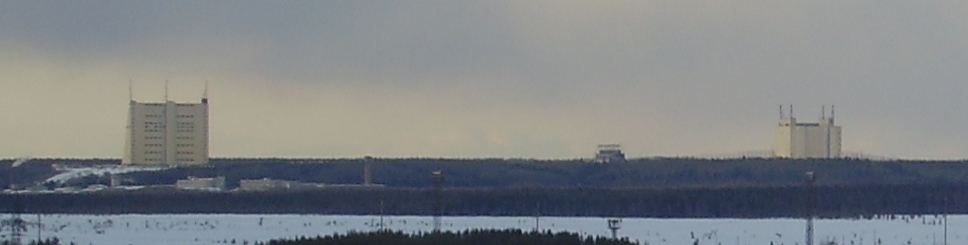
Daryal early warning radar station in Pechora

As for year 2005 the Joint CIS AD System included:

- 20 fighter regiments;
- 29 surface to air-missile regiments;
- 22 electronic intelligence units;
- 2 electronic warfare battalions.

The existing composition of forces was determined by a decision ratified in December 2015:

- 20 aviation units;
- 40 units of anti-aircraft missile forces;
- 20 units of radio-technical forces,

SAM regiments are armed with 9K33 Osa, 9K37 Buk, S-75 Dvina, S-125 Neva/Pechora, S-200 Angara/Vega/Dubna and S-300 Favorit systems. Fighter jets include MiG-23, MiG-29, MiG-31 and Su-27. Joint exercises of CIS AD System are commonly held at Ashuluk range in Astrakhan Oblast.

== Early warning system ==
The Russian early warning system was set up in Soviet times. Its headquarters and two satellite data reception stations are located in Russia, as well as 3 out of 8 radar stations. They include the Dnepr/Daugava system in Olenegorsk, the Dnepr/Dnestr-M system in Mishelevka, Usolye-Sibirskoye, and the Daryal system in Pechora.

The remaining radar stations are:

- Dnepr/Dnestr-M system in Balkash-9, Sary Shagan, Kazakhstan;
- Volga radar in Belarus (Hantsavichy);
- Okno electro-optical space surveillance station in Tajikistan;
- Okno-S electro-optical space surveillance station in Primorsky Krai.

The two Dnepr radars in Ukraine (Mukachevo and Sevastopol) used to be part of the system until 2008. The next generation of Russian radar are the Voronezh radar.

In 2008, Russia announced its withdrawal from the agreement with Ukraine on their use due to an increase in rent and doubts about the reliability of the information received. On February 26, 2009, the flow of information from them stopped.

== See also ==
- Collective Security Treaty Organisation
- Main Space Intelligence Centre
- PAVE PAWS
- Perimeter Acquisition Radar Attack Characterization System
- Soviet Air Defence Forces
- Union State
