= Gabala Radar Station =

Former radar station in Azerbaijan

- Qəbələ RLS
- Azerbaijan
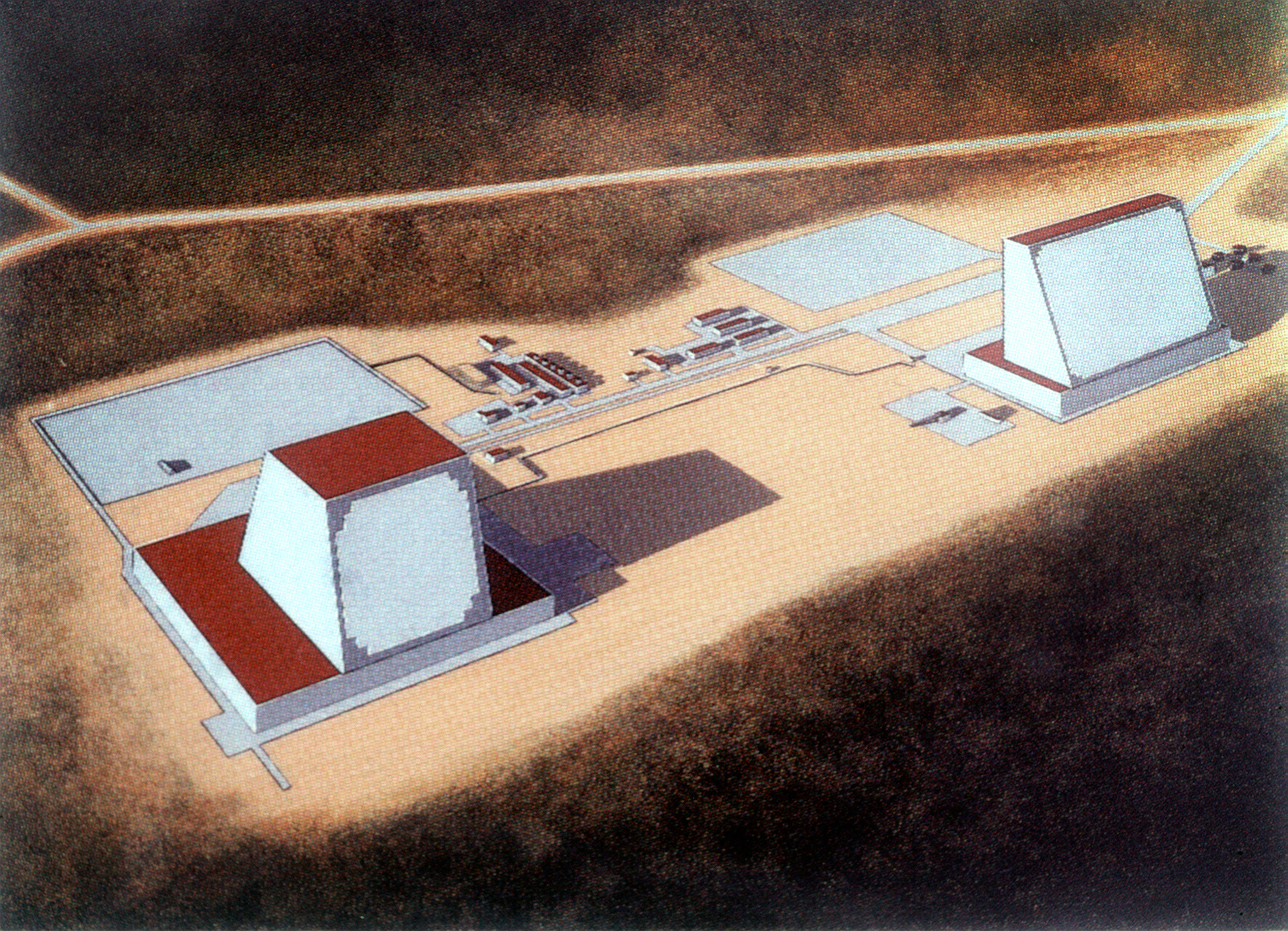
- US military artist's drawing of a Daryal installation

Site information
- Type: Radar station
- Code: RO-7
- Owner: Azerbaijan
- Controlled by: Azerbaijani Air Forces
- Open to the public: No
- Condition: Closed

Location
- Location within Azerbaijan
- Coordinates: 40.87°N 47.80°E
- Height: 100 metres (328 ft) receiver building

Site history
- Built: 1977–1985
- Built by: Soviet Union
- Materials: concrete

Garrison information
- Garrison: 428th independent Radio-Technical Unit (until closure in 2012)

Gabala Radar Station (Russian: Габалинская РЛС, romanized: Gabalinskaya RLS; Azerbaijani: Qəbələ RLS) (Note: in some sources Gabala is spelled Qabala, other names are Lyaki, Mingacevir and Mingechaur) was a Daryal-type (NATO Pechora) bistatic passive electronically scanned array early warning radar, built by the Soviet Union in the Qabala district of the Azerbaijan SSR in 1985. It was operated by the Russian Aerospace Defence Forces and closed at the end of 2012. The radar station had a range of up to 6,000 kilometres (3,728 mi), and was designed to detect missile launches as far as the Indian Ocean. The radar's surveillance covered Iran, Turkey, India, Iraq and the entire Middle East. It could detect the launch of missiles and track the whole trajectory to enable a ballistic missile defense system to intercept an offensive strike. The Radar Station hosted about 1,000 Russian servicemen with about 500 Azerbaijanis.

After the dissolution of the Soviet Union, the Russian Federation and Azerbaijan negotiated the terms of the lease and in 2002 the two countries signed an agreement according to which Russia leased the station from Azerbaijan until 24 December 2012 for $7 million per year rent, $5 million per year for electricity and $10 million per year for other services.

In 2012 the future of the station was being negotiated between Russia and Azerbaijan. Azerbaijan and Armenia have ongoing tension and Russia and Armenia are close. Both Armenia and Azerbaijan are members of the CIS but only Armenia is a member of the Collective Security Treaty Organisation. Russia has a new Voronezh radar in Armavir which covers the same region as Gabala. Russia offered to modernise the station and Azerbaijan wanted to increase the rent Russia paid.

In December 2012, Russia announced that negotiations had been unsuccessful and that they had stopped using the radar station. The station was given back to Azerbaijan and all the equipment dismantled and transported to Russia.

== Daryal radar overview ==
The Daryal-type radar is a bistatic phased-array early warning radar. It consists of two separate large phased-array antennas separated by around 500 metres (1,640 ft) to 1.5 kilometres (4,921 ft). The transmitter array is 30 by 40 metres (98 ft × 131 ft) and the receiver is 80 by 80 metres (260 ft × 260 ft) in size. The system is a VHF system operating at a wavelength of 1.5 to 2 meters (150 to 200 MHz). Its initial transmit capacity was 50 MW with a target capacity of 350 MW.

Originally, at least seven Daryal facilities were planned, however, only the first two facilities completed, Pechora and Gabala, were ever operational. Two Daryal-U type were to be built at sites in Balkhash and Mishelevka, Irkutsk, neither were completed. The US Clinton administration offered financial assistance in completing the Mishelevka facility in exchange for amending the ABM treaty to allow US deployment of a national missile defense system. Russia rejected this proposal and in 2002 the US unilaterally withdrew from the ABM treaty. Two Daryal-UM systems were to be constructed in Skrunda, Latvia and Mukachevo, Ukraine. The one in Mukachevo in Ukraine was never completed after the fall of the Soviet Union and the Skrunda facility was turned over to Latvia to be demolished. The Yeniseysk (Krasnoyarsk) Daryal-U site caused concern in the west over compliance with the Anti-Ballistic Missile Treaty during its construction in the 1980s. Following years of negotiations, in September 1989 the Soviets admitted it was a violation of the treaty, construction ceased and the facility was eventually dismantled.

== Strategic Importance of Gabala ==
During the 33rd G8 summit in Germany on June 7–8, 2007, Russian president Vladimir Putin made an offer to deploy elements of an American anti-ballistic missile system in Azerbaijan, instead of Poland (see US missile defense complex in Poland) and the Czech Republic, using the Gabala Radar Station jointly with Russia. This offer came after the debate about the U.S. plan to deploy anti-ballistic missile system components in Eastern Europe to defend against possible ballistic missile attacks from Iran and North Korea. The plan was met with sharp criticism by Russia which threatened to target Europe with its own ballistic missiles despite US claims that the system was not designed to defend against a large scale Russian attack. The Gabala radar is used as a sensor for the A-135 ABM system which Russia has operated in Europe, near Moscow, since the 1970s.

In the beginning of July 2007 the US announced that the Gabala installation was not an acceptable substitute for the Poland and Czech Republic sites. In July 2007 at a Kennebunkport, Maine summit Russia offered data from its Armavir Radar Station as well. Russia says that Gabala identified 150 launches of scud missiles during the Iran–Iraq War and has been watching Iranian missile launches. Data from Gabala, together with Armavir, were offered to the United States to show they provide good coverage of any potential launches from Iran.

Location of Gabala and Armavir in the region.

== Environmental concerns ==
There were reports about environmental damage from the activity of Gabala Radar Station which sparked some public debate in Azerbaijan. Similar health concerns were raised about American PAVE PAWS phased array radars, but as of 2005 available data did not support those concerns. Surveys undertaken by the Radiation Problems Institute of the Azerbaijan National Academy of Sciences and the Ministry of Ecology and Natural Resources did not find abnormal values but could not verify whether or not the station was operational at the time that measurements were taken.

Some sources say that the station occupies about 210 hectares (519 acres); however, the Russian military says 190 acres (77 ha). Opponents of the station say that another 400 hectares of forest were cut down while laying transmission lines to service the station and that the underground water level has fallen sharply after 16 boreholes were drilled to supply water to the station's cooling system. Every hour of cooling requires about 300–400 cubic meters of water, after which the untreated water is discharged into a river. Because of depleted groundwater surrounding forests are dying. Many species of fish in the river have disappeared. The local population continues to use water from the river despite potential contamination.

The newspaper Baku Zerkalo reports that in 1984, when the power was 300 MW, one hectare of land was completely burnt out. In other instances, sources of ignition for trees on the radiation meter range are not described. Such fires do not occur when operating a similar radar station in Pechora with comparable power to the Don-2N radar station in the Moscow suburbs.

== See also ==
- Military of Azerbaijan
- A-135 anti-ballistic missile system
