= Voronezh radar =

Russian early warning radar system

Voronezh
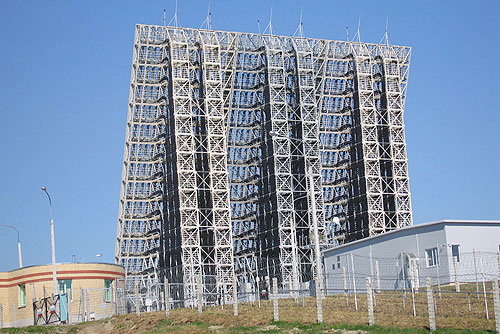
- Front of Voronezh-M early-warning radar, Lekhtusi Radar Station, July 2012
- Country of origin: Russia
- Designer: Mints Radiotechnical Institute
- Introduced: 2009
- No. built: 8 operational as of 2017
- Type: Phased array early-warning radar
- Frequency: Voronezh-M: 150–200 MHz (VHF); Voronezh-DM: 0.5 m wavelength (UHF)
- Range: Up to 6,000 km, accompanying 500 targets
- Power: Claimed 0.7 MW consumption
- Other names: 77Ya6 (77Я6)

Voronezh radar, operational and under construction.
VHF (-M/-VP) radar
UHF (-DM) radar

Voronezh radars (Russian: РЛС Воронеж) are the current generation of Russian early-warning radar, providing long distance monitoring of airspace against ballistic missile attack and aircraft monitoring. The first radar, in Lekhtusi near St Petersburg, became operational in 2009. There is a plan to replace older radars with the Voronezh by 2020.

Their common name follows the pattern of Soviet radars in being named after a river, the Voronezh. The previous generation of radar was known as the Daryal (after Darial Gorge), Volga (after Volga River) and Daugava (Daugava River) and the generation before the Dnepr (Dnieper River), and Dnestr (Dniester River).

The Voronezh radars are described as highly prefabricated meaning that they have a set-up time of months rather than years and need fewer personnel than previous generations. They are also modular so that a radar can be brought into (partial) operation whilst being incomplete.

Russia has used the launch of these new radars to raise its concerns about US missile defence in Europe. At the launch of the Kaliningrad radar in November 2011 Russian president Dmitry Medvedev was quoted as saying "I expect that this step [the launch of the radar] will be seen by our partners as the first signal of our country's readiness to make an adequate response to the threats which the missile shield poses for our strategic nuclear forces."

== Types ==
All types are phased array radars.

- Voronezh-M (77Ya6-M) works in the meter range of wavelengths (VHF) and was designed by RTI Mints.
- Voronezh-DM (77Ya6-DM) works in the decimeter range (UHF) and was designed by NPK NIIDAR. It has a range of up to 10,000 km and is capable of simultaneously tracking 500 objects. Its horizon range is 6000 km and vertical range is 8000 km (due to radar horizon, this range is only applicable if target is located at altitude of several kilometers). Russia claims the radar can detect targets the size of a "football ball" at a distance of 8000 km.
- Voronezh-VP (77Ya6-VP) works in the meter range (VHF) and was designed by RTI Mints. The only one built has 6 segments instead of the 3 of the Voronezh-M.

A Voronezh-M is claimed to cost 2.85 billion rubles and a Voronezh-DM 4.3 billion rubles. This compares to the 5 billion ruble cost of a Dnepr and 19.8 billion rubles for a Daryal, at current prices. Voronezh systems are manufactured at the Saransk Television Plant.

Their designers, Sergey Boev (RTI), Sergey Saprykin (NIIDAR), and Valeriy Karasev (RTI Mints), were jointly awarded the 2011 State Prize for Science and Technology for their work on the Voronezh.

== Installations ==
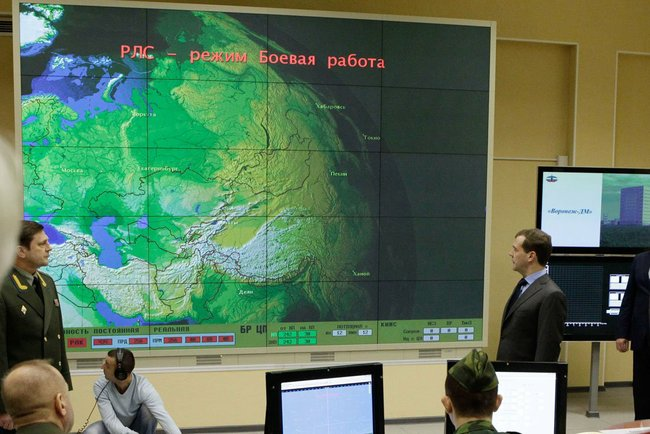
Dmitry Medvedev orders the introduction of the radar "Voronezh-DM" of the Aerospace Defense Troops, Kaliningrad 2011

The first radar, a Voronezh-M, was built in Lekhtusi near St Petersburg. It entered testing in 2005 and was declared "combat ready" in 2012. It is adjacent to the A.F. Mozhaysky Military-Space Academy, which is an officer training centre for the Aerospace Defence Forces. It is described as filling the early warning gap caused by the closure of the radar station at Skrunda in Latvia in 1998, although the Volga radar in Hantsavichy, Belarus, has also been described as doing this, and as a UHF radar Volga has a different resolution from the VHF Voronezh-M.

The second radar is at Armavir in southern Russia on the site of Baronovsky Airfield. It is a Voronezh-DM, a UHF radar and was announced as replacing the coverage lost when the Dnestr radars in Sevastopol and Mukachevo, Ukraine, were closed in 2009. There are actually two radars at this site; the first one covers the south west and could replace the Ukrainian radars. The second radar is facing south east and could replace the Daryal radar in Gabala that closed at the end of 2012. The radar station at Armavir was damaged by a Ukrainian drone strike in 2024 during the Russo-Ukrainian War.

The third radar is to the south of Pionersky in Kaliningrad, on the site of Dunayevka airfield. It is another UHF Voronezh-DM and is surrounded by countries that are now in NATO. There is only one radar here and it is fully operational in 2014.

A radar was built at Mishelevka in Irkutsk on the site of the former, and never operational, Daryal radar which was demolished in 2011. The radar is a Voronezh-VP and is sited close to the former Daryal transmitter building. This radar covers the south and can replace one of the two Dnepr radars at that site. Another Voronezh-VP array was planned which gives 240-degree coverage and this is ready by 2014.

It is planned to build a Voronezh-VP radar at Pechora in 2015 to replace the Daryal there. Similarly, a Voronezh-VP is planned for Olenegorsk in 2017 to replace the Dnepr/Daugava. As part of the public negotiations over the future of Gabala Radar Station, it had been suggested that the Daryal there could be replaced by a Voronezh-VP in 2017, although the station closed at the end of 2012 instead.

Work started on the station at Barnaul in 2013; other locations announced are Omsk, Yeniseysk and Orenburg.

On 20 December 2017, three new Voronezh radar stations entered service in Russia, thus increasing the total number of operational radars to 8 (Armavir Radar Station operates 2 radars). The radars are located in Krasnoyarsk Krai, Altai Krai and Orenburg Oblast.

According to Russia's Ministry of Defence, in 2022 construction of new radar stations near Vorkuta and Murmansk (Olenegorsk) will be completed.

== Locations ==
Location	Coordinates	Type	Status	Details
Lekhtusi Radar Station, Leningrad Oblast	60°16′31.65″N 30°32′45.66″E	Voronezh-M	Operational	Fills gap in coverage caused by loss of the Skrunda-1 radar. Fully operational in 2012.
Armavir Radar Station, Krasnodar Krai	44°55′30.38″N 40°59′2.02″E	Voronezh-DM	Operational	Two radars at this site. One covers the south west, the second stage covers the South/South-East and replaced the Gabala Radar Station in Azerbaijan. Fully operational in April 2015. On 26 May 2024, Ukrainian media reported that an HUR drone struck a Russian early-warning Voronezh M radar system in Orsk, Orenburg Oblast after travelling a distance of some 1,800 kilometres. Low-resolution satellite images appear to show burn marks; the radar is part of the Russian nuclear early warning for air/space-based threats such as ballistic missiles and bombers.
Pionersky Radar Station at former Dunayevka air base, Kaliningrad Oblast	54.857294°N 20.18235°E	Voronezh-DM	Operational	Partially operational in November 2011 and fully operational in 2014.
Mishelevka Radar Station, Irkutsk Oblast	52°51′20.11″N 103°13′53.94″E	Voronezh-VP	Operational	Replaced one of the Dnepr radars and Daryal-U radar that was demolished in June 2011. The radar entered trials in March 2012, fully operational since 2015.
Near Yeniseysk, Krasnoyarsk Krai - but not the former radar site	58.506095°N 92.046072°E	Voronezh-DM	Operational	Fully operational in December 2017.
Near Barnaul, Altai Krai	53°08′21.1″N 83°40′52.5″E	Voronezh-DM	Operational	Fully operational in December 2017.
Near Orsk, Orenburg Oblast	51.273346°N 58.959030°E	Voronezh-M	Operational	Fully operational in December 2017. Attacked by Ukrainian drone on 26 May 2024.
Near Vorkuta, Komi - but not the former radar site	67°36′50.3″N 63°45′19.5″E	Voronezh-M	Under construction	Construction started. Will replace the current Daryal radar at this site.
Near Olenegorsk, Murmansk Oblast - but not the former radar site	68.090694°N 34.327539°E	Voronezh-VP	Under construction	Construction started. Will replace the Dnestr/Daugava radar at this site.
Near Sevastopol, Crimean Peninsula	44.5788°N 33.3862°E	Voronezh-SM	Planned	Will replace the current Dnestr radar at this site.

== See also ==
- J/FPS-5
