= Yeniseysk-15 =

Site of disputed Soviet phased array radar

Yeniseysk-15 radar installation
- Siberia, Russia
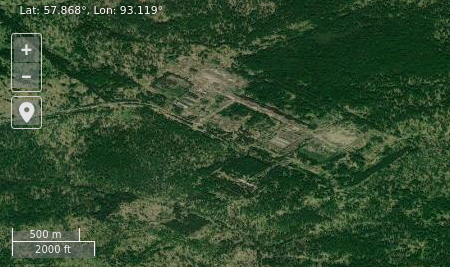
- Satellite imagery of the former Yeniseysk-15 radar station

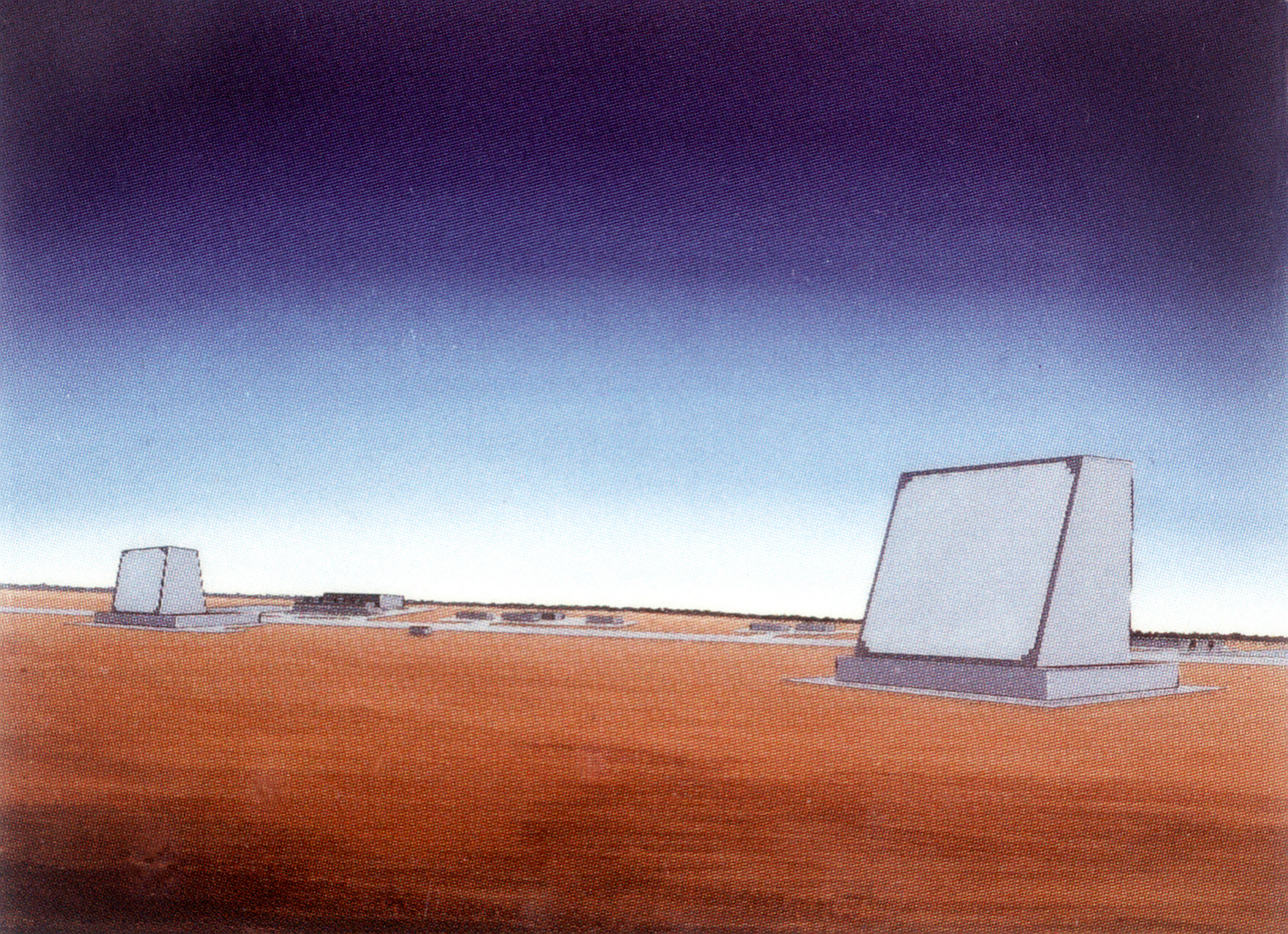
- US military artist's drawing of the Daryal radar at Krasnoyarsk

Site information
- Type: Radar station
- Code: OS-3
- Condition: Demolished

Location
- Map of Russia showing the location of Yeniseysk
- Coordinates: 57.8680°N 93.1186°E
- Height: 100 metres (328 ft) receiver building

Site history
- Built: 1983
- Built by: Soviet Union
- Materials: concrete

Yeniseysk-15 was the site of a disputed Soviet phased array radar near Yeniseysk in Krasnoyarsk Krai, Siberia. The never operational Daryal radar installation was demolished in 1989 after the United States claimed it was in breach of the Anti-Ballistic Missile Treaty.

== Daryal radar ==
The radar being built at Yeniseysk was a Daryal-U (NATO codename "Pechora"), a large phased array radar consisting of two separate large phased-array antennas 850 metres (2,789 ft) apart. The transmitter array was 30 by 40 metres (98 ft × 131 ft) and the receiver was 80 by 80 metres (260 ft × 260 ft) in size. The system is a VHF system operating at a wavelength of 1.5 to 2 meters (150 to 200 MHz). The claimed range of a Daryal installation is 6,000 kilometres (3,728 mi).

Originally, at least seven Daryal facilities were planned, however, only the first two facilities completed, Pechora and Gabala, were ever operational. Two other Daryal-U type were to be built at Balkhash and Mishelevka, Irkutsk, neither were completed before the collapse of the Soviet Union.

Coordinates	Azimuth	Type	Built
57°52′5.67″N 93°7′7.26″E transmitter 57°52′24.22″N 93°6′28.09″E receiver	40° (estimated)	Daryal-U	1983-1987

== Location ==
The Soviet Union started a programme to replace all Dnepr (NATO: Hen House) radars with the intention that this would be complete by the mid 1990s and five Daryals were under construction by 1983. The early warning system had a gap as it did not cover submarine launches of ballistic missiles in the Pacific Ocean. A radar site was needed that would face north east covering this area. The 1972 anti-ballistic missile treaty placed restrictions on the location of early warning radars. Article VI b) states that the United States and the Soviet Union agree:

not to deploy in the future radars for early warning of strategic ballistic missile attack except at locations along the periphery of its national territory and oriented outward.

Initially the manufacturers recommended two sites, Norilsk and Yakutsk, both of which were compliant with the treaty. They were overruled by the Ministry of Defence on cost grounds and Yeniseysk was selected despite being 3,000 kilometres (1,900 mi) from the border. It was believed that Yeniseysk, being inland, would provide the coverage of two radars further out. It is also closer to the Siberian industrial region which would make it cheaper as it has good railway and power infrastructure nearby.

== Controversy ==
The Soviet Union announced that the new radar was for space surveillance rather than for early warning of missile attack, and hence was compliant with the ABM treaty. The radar was given the designation OS-3 (OS-1 was Mishelevka and OS-2 Balkhash) rather than an RO- designation which would be associated with an early warning site. However the radar appeared to be a Daryal radar which were used for ballistic missile early warning as well as space surveillance.

The United States complained and construction was halted in 1987. In 1989 the Soviet Union admitted that it was a breach of the treaty and it was demolished.

Map of the Russian Far Eastern Federal District showing the location of Yeniseysk and the proposed sites of Norilsk and Yakutsk.
