= Pechora Radar Station =

Radar station in the Komi Republic, Russia

Pechora Radar Station
- Печорская радиолокационная станция
- Kola Peninsula, Russia
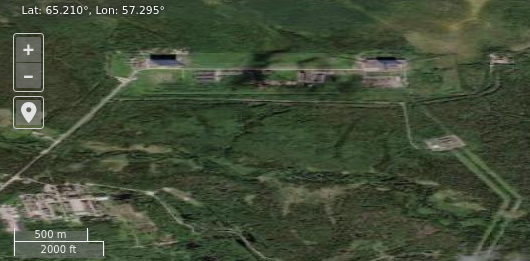
- Satellite imagery of Pechora Radar Station

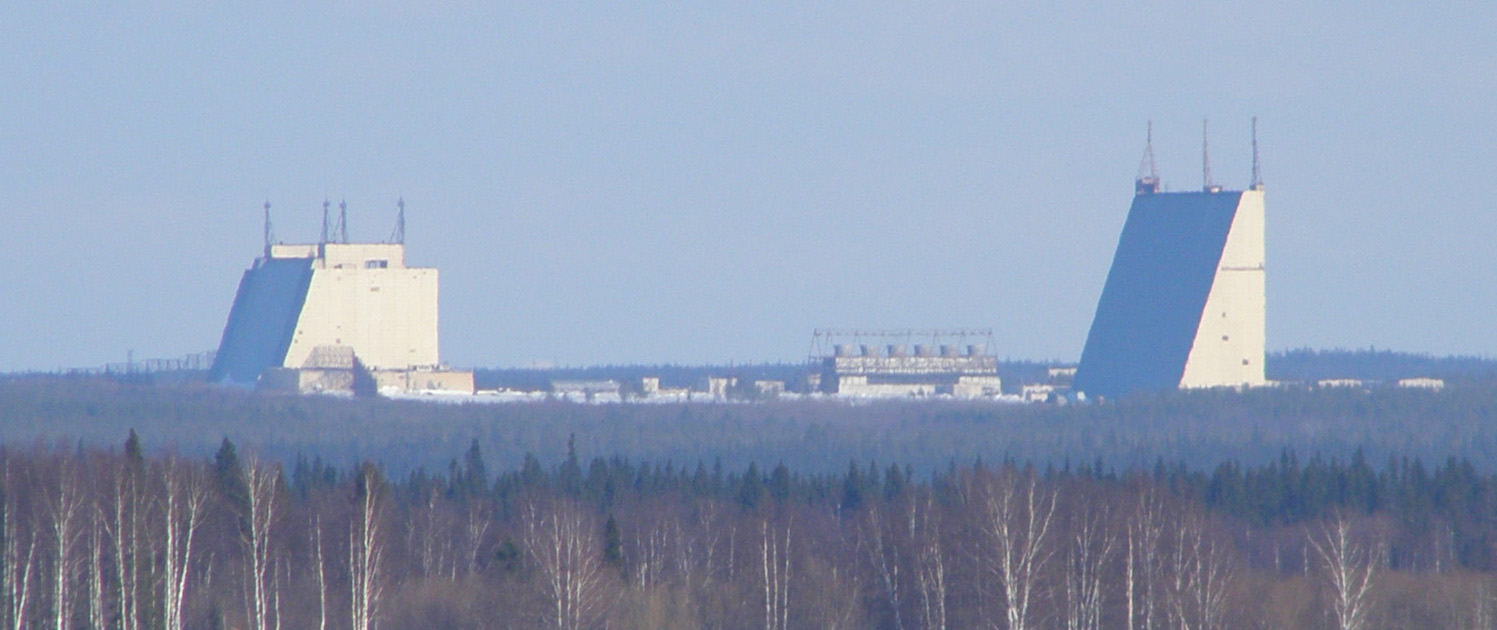
- The Daryal radar in Pechora

Site information
- Type: Radar Station
- Code: RO-30
- Owner: Russian Aerospace Forces
- Controlled by: Russian Space Forces
- Open to the public: no
- Condition: operational

Location
- Pechora located in Russia
- Coordinates: 65.210°N 57.295°E

Site history
- Built: 1984
- Built by: Soviet Union
- Materials: concrete

Garrison information
- Garrison: 378th independent radio-technical unit

Pechora Radar Station (Russian: Печорская радиолокационная станция, romanized: Pechorskaya radiolokatsionnaya stantsiya) is an early warning radar near Pechora in the Komi Republic, northern Russia. It is a key part of the Russian early warning system against missile attack and was built by the Soviet Union, becoming operational in 1984. It is run by the Russian Space Forces.

== Daryal radar overview ==
Pechora is a Daryal radar, a bistatic passive electronically scanned array early warning radar consisting of two separate large phased-array antennas separated by around 500 metres (1,640 ft) to 1.5 kilometres (4,921 ft). The transmitter array is 30 by 40 metres (98 ft × 131 ft) and the receiver is 80 by 80 metres (260 ft × 260 ft) in size. The system is a VHF system operating at a wavelength of 1.5 to 2 meters (150 to 200 MHz). The claimed range of a Daryal installation is 6,000 kilometres (3,728 mi).

Originally, at least seven Daryal facilities were planned, however, only the first two facilities completed, Pechora and Gabala, were ever operational. Two Daryal-U type were to be built at sites in Balkhash and Mishelevka, Irkutsk; neither were completed. The US Clinton administration offered financial assistance in completing the Mishelevka facility in exchange for amending the ABM treaty to allow US deployment of a national missile defense system. Russia rejected this proposal and in 2002 the US unilaterally withdrew from the ABM treaty.

Two Daryal-UM systems were to be constructed in Skrunda, Latvia and Mukachevo, Ukraine. The Mukachevo one in Ukraine was never completed after the fall of the Soviet Union and the Skrunda facility was turned over to Latvia to be demolished. The Yeniseysk (Krasnoyarsk) Daryal-U site caused concern in the west over compliance with the Anti-Ballistic Missile Treaty during its construction in the 1980s. Following years of negotiations, in September 1989 the Soviets admitted it was a violation of the treaty, construction ceased and the facility was eventually dismantled.
