= Khersones air base =

Russian Black Sea Fleet air base near Sevastopol, Crimea

Khersones
- Sevastopol, Crimea
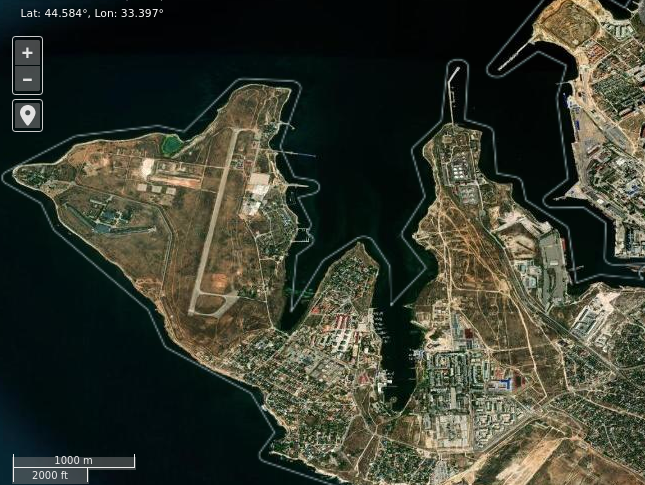
- Satellite imagery of Khersones air base

Site information
- Type: Air Base
- Operator: Russian Navy - Russian Naval Aviation
- Controlled by: Black Sea Fleet

Location
- Shown within Crimea Khersones (Ukraine)
- Coordinates: 44°35′02″N 33°23′49″E

Site history
- In use: -present

Airfield information
Runways
Direction	Length and surface
01/19	1,770 metres (5,807 ft) Concrete

Khersones is an airbase of the Russian Navy's Black Sea Fleet located near Sevastopol, Crimea.

== History ==
From 1950, two newly formed air defence fighter regiments of the Soviet Union 49th Fighter Aviation Division of the Black Sea Fleet, the 433rd and 639th Fighter Aviation Regiments, were based at the Khersones airfield. The division's headquarters were located at the Belbek airfield. In 1958, the 639th regiment was redeployed to the Oktyabrskoye airfield. Both regiments were armed with MiG-17 fighters. On April 6, 1960, by a directive of the USSR Ministry of Defence dated March 16, 1960, as part of the "further significant reduction in the Armed Forces of the USSR," the headquarters of the 49th Fighter Aviation Division at the Belbek airfield was disbanded. At the same time, the 628th and 433rd air regiments were disbanded.

After the early 1990s, following the dissolution of the Soviet Union, the base was little used by the Ukrainian military.

On the southwestern side of the airfield, the RO-4 facility was built - the Sevastopol Radar Station, an over-the-horizon radar station of the Dniester-type for space control systems and early warning of missile attack. After the collapse of the USSR, the government of the Russian Federation signed an agreement with the government of Ukraine on the lease of the radar station for 15 years. The station was serviced by Ukrainian personnel, and the information received was sent to the Main Centre for Missile Attack Warning in Solnechnogorsk. For this information, Russia annually transferred to Ukraine, according to various sources, from $800,000 to 1.5 million dollars. On February 26, 2009, the RO-4 station stopped transmitting data. Currently, the station is not functioning, its commissioning or modernization is in question.

Air Forces Monthly reported in 2022 that the base was home to a Russian UAV squadron which used both the Orlan-10 and Forpost in support of the Black Sea Fleet.
