= Chinese missile warning system =

National strategic defence asset being developed by China

The Chinese missile warning system is a national strategic defence asset being developed by China with assistance from Russia.

== Chinese military efforts ==
China has been known to be developing a missile warning system since about 2014. The designation “JL-1A” has been associated with this system.

== Russia’s involvement ==
On 3 October 2019, President Vladimir Putin said Russia is assisting China in developing the missile warning system. “We are now helping our Chinese partners to create a missile-warning system, a missile-attack warning system,” Putin said at the Valdai Club conference of foreign-policy experts in Sochi. “This is a very serious thing that will dramatically increase China’s defense capability, because only the US and Russia have such a system now.”

On 4 October 2019, Sergei Boyev, director general of Vympel NPO, a major weapons manufacturer in Russia, confirmed to Russia's state-run media that the company was working on "modelling" the system for China. Russia hopes to integrate China's early warning system with Russia's. This will provide China with an increased detection range from the North pole as well as the Atlantic and Pacific Ocean.

Russia operates the Voronezh radar system, which it continues to develop. This may be used as a basis for the Chinese system.
