= Lekhtusi Radar Station =

Lekhtusi Radar Station

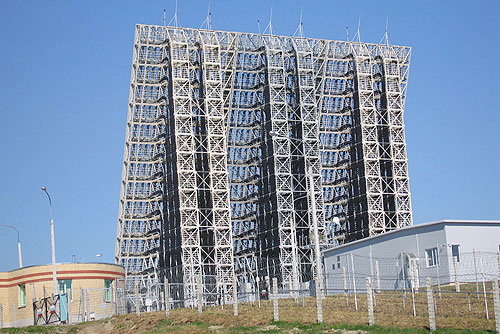
- Rear of the radar array

Site information
- Type: Radar Station
- Owner: Russian Aerospace Forces
- Controlled by: Russian Space Forces
- Open to the public: no
- Condition: operational

Location
- Lekhtusi located in Russia
- Coordinates: 60.275458°N 30.546017°E

Site history
- Built: 2004
- Built by: Russia
- In use: Russia

Garrison information
- Garrison: 571st independent radio-technical unit

Lekhtusi Radar Station is an early warning radar near Lekhtusi in Leningrad Oblast, Russia. It is a key part of the Russian early warning system against missile attack, going on combat duty on 11 February 2012. It is run by the Russian Space Forces.

There have been a number of announcements about the introduction of this radar, the first one of the third generation Voronezh series of early warning radar. It first entered testing in December 2005, experimental service a year later, service in December 2009 and finally combat duty in 2012.

The station is 2 kilometres (1.2 mi) south west of the village of Lekhtusi and 40 kilometres (25 mi) north north east of St Petersburg. It is adjacent to the A.F. Mozhaysky Military-Space Academy which is an officer training centre for the Russian Space Forces.

== Voronezh radar ==
Voronezh radar are highly prefabricated radars needing fewer personnel and using less energy than previous generations. The one built in Lekhtusi is described as Voronezh-M, a VHF radar with a stated range of 4,200 kilometres (2,610 mi). The radar was described by Space Forces commander Oleg Ostapenko as covering north west Russia and replacing coverage lost when the radar at Skrunda in Latvia was decommissioned in 1998.
