= Shipka (military base) =

- Ukraine
- Map of the installation

Site information
- Type: military installation
- Code: RO-5
- Condition: closed

Location
- Map of Ukraine showing the location of Mukachevo
- Coordinates: 48.37768°N 22.70744°E

Site history
- Built: 1970s
- Built by: Soviet Union

Shipka is a small military base near the city of Mukachevo (just outside a small village of Shenborn) in Ukraine. In the past it was a Soviet base that served the Soviet-installed Dnepr radar.

== Overview ==
In 1992, it was rented to Russia for 15 years. In 2009 the base stopped transferring data to Russia because the Russian authorities refused to continue paying for land lease which was increased in 2006. Formally, in 2008 Russia denounced the Russia-Ukraine agreement about rocket warning systems.

Currently it is a base of the State Space Agency of Ukraine, "Національне космічне агентство України. Західний центр радіотехнічного спостереження", formally part of Mukachevo.
