= Sevastopol Radar Station =

Soviet radar station in Crimea

Sevastopol radar station
- Sevastopol, Ukraine
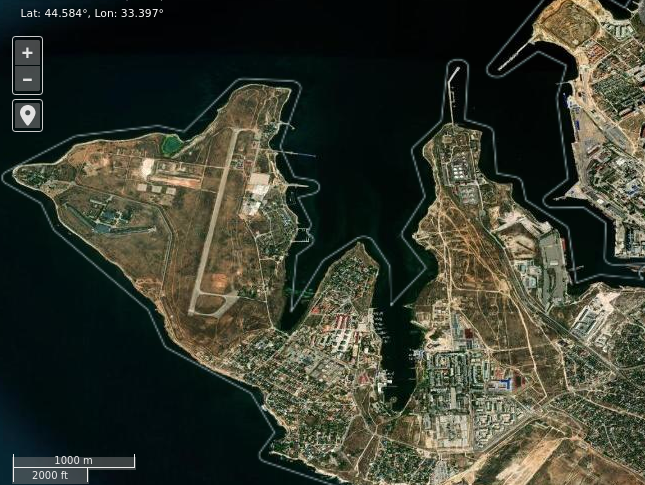
- Sevastopol Radar Station west of the airfield

- Plan of the site showing the two wings of the Dnepr overlooking the Black Sea

Site information
- Type: Radar station
- Code: RO-4
- Condition: ruined?

Location
- Map showing the location of Sevastopol
- Coordinates: 44.5788°N 33.3862°E
- Height: 75 metres (246 ft)

Site history
- Built: 1968-
- Built by: Soviet Union

Sevastopol radar station was a Soviet radar station providing early warning of ballistic missile attack. It was located between the Cape of Chersones and the auxiliary airfield "Chersones" (Marine Aviation of the Black Sea Fleet) in Sevastopol and was part of the Soviet missile attack warning system. Information from this station could be used for a launch-on-warning nuclear missile attack or to engage the A-135 anti-ballistic missile system.

The radar occupies a site 1 km long overlooking the Black Sea. Nearby there is a former Soviet Navy dolphinarium and a former airfield. When the station was built it was in the then-closed town of Sevastopol, in the Ukrainian SSR.

== Radar ==
The radar is a Dnepr (NATO name "Hen House") phased array radar. It consists of a central building and two long wings over 250 metres long; each wing is a separate radar array. One had an azimuth of 172° (facing south) and the other 230° (facing south-east). The radar had a range of 3,000 kilometres (1,900 mi) covering southern Europe, North Africa and parts of the Middle East.

Construction began on the radar in the late 1960s. Some sources say that it started operating in 1975, others say it became fully operational on 16 January 1979.

== Dispute with Ukraine ==
In 1991 the Soviet Union collapsed and the station became part of the newly independent country of Ukraine, together with the radar in Mukachevo. Russia signed a 15-year agreement with Ukraine in 1992 to rent both radars for US$840,000 a year. Unlike other overseas stations, the radar was to be staffed by Ukrainians, not Russians. In 2005 management of the radars was transferred from the military to the civil Ukrainian National Space Agency and the rent increased to $1.3 million, although Ukraine asked for more.

In 2008 Russia decided to stop using information from the two Ukrainian radar stations. According to some commentators it was partly because of the then Ukrainian government's stated intention to join NATO. In 2007 the commander of the Russian Space Forces, Vladimir Popovkin, said that Russia intended to duplicate or replace foreign radar stations as it could not rely on them in times of crisis. Replacing the station would reduce any leverage Ukraine was gaining over Russia from its ability to control access to the data.

Pragmatic reasons were given for ending the lease. Popovkin said that the radars went out of warranty in 2005, and would cost $20m to modernise. In addition Russia said that the data from Sevastopol was unreliable due to interference from unlicensed radio broadcasts from fishing boats in the Black Sea. Furthermore, it had concerns with the quality of the data due to the civilian rather than military operators.

Data from Ukraine stopped on 26 February 2009 and Russia declared that a new Voronezh radar station in Armavir had begun operation on the same date, replacing the lost coverage. Following this the Ukrainian government announced that the stations would be closed for a month for maintenance and then used part-time for space surveillance, being part of an organisation called SKAKO (Automatic System of Control and Analysis of Outer Space).

External image
- 2011 photos

== Returning to Russia ==
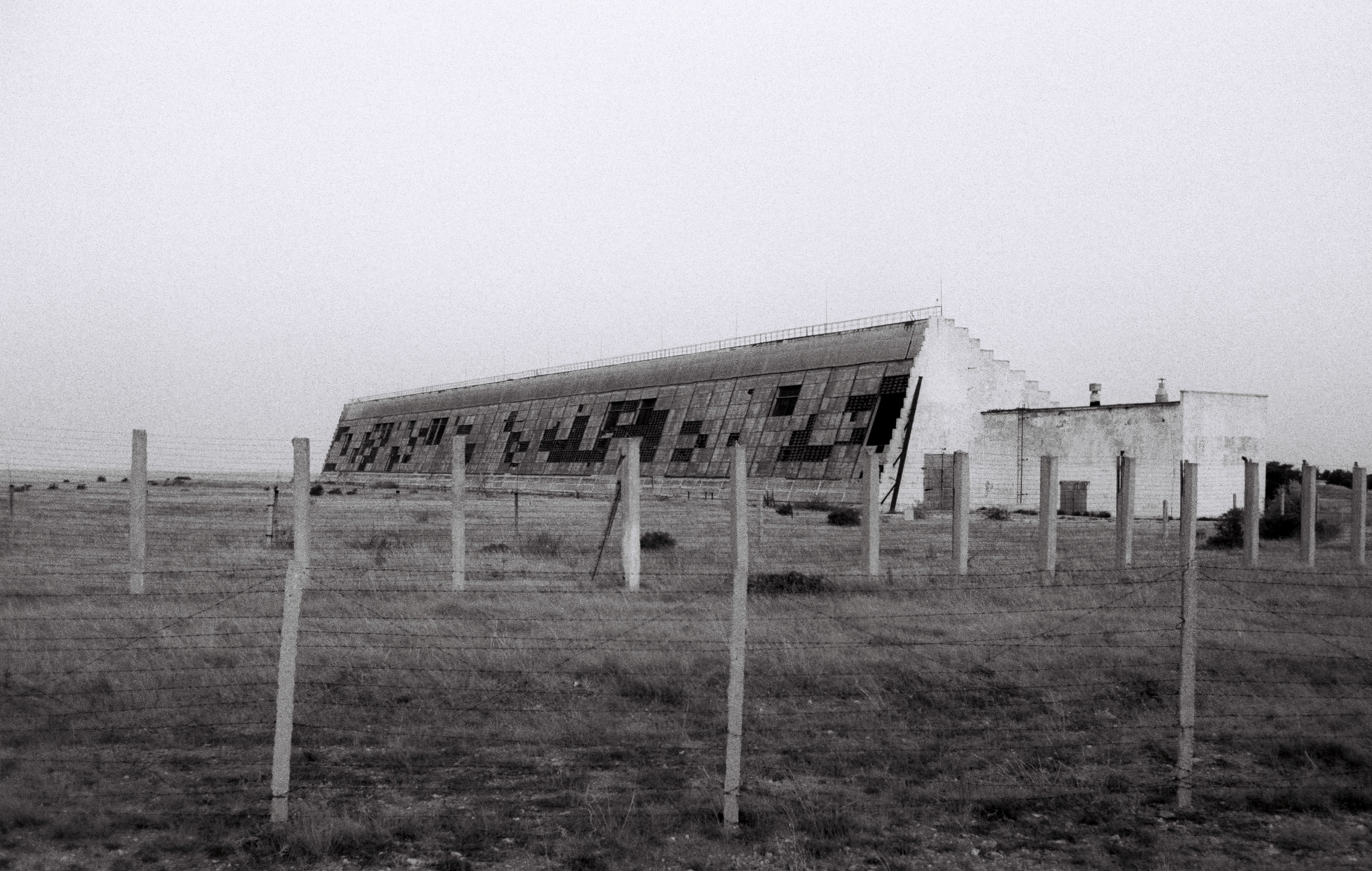
East wing of the Dnepr in 2014

Following the annexation of Crimea by the Russian Federation, the new Russian administration announced it was considering having the site modernized and fully re-opened by 2018. This is to offset the threat of the NATO radar site in Romania, as the Mk-41 launchers there are capable of launching Tomahawk cruise missiles, which Russia says violates the 1987 INF Treaty. However due to the age of the system and its derelict state, that timetable appears not to have been met, no reopening announcement having been made by December 2019.
