= Armavir Radar Station =

Russian radar station in Armavir

Armavir Radar Station
- РЛС в Армавире
- Armavir, Krasnodar Krai, Russia
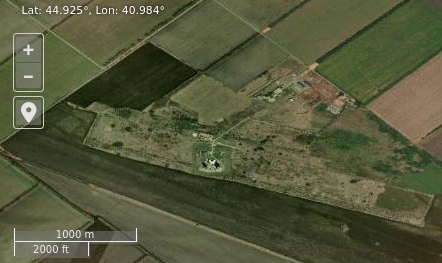
- Satellite imagery of Armavir Radar Station

Site information
- Type: Radar Station
- Owner: Russian Aerospace Forces
- Controlled by: Russian Space Forces
- Open to the public: no
- Condition: operational

Location
- Armavir located in Russia
- Coordinates: 44.925106°N 40.983894°E
- Height: 30 metres (98 ft)

Site history
- Built: 2006-
- Built by: Russia
- In use: Russia

Garrison information
- Current commander: Vadim Severov (2009)

Armavir Radar Station (Russian: Радиолокационная станция (РЛС) в Армавире) is an early warning radar station near Armavir in Krasnodar Krai, Russia. It is a key part of the Russian early warning system against missile attack and is run by the Russian Space Forces. There are two radars here – one faces south west and one south east. They provide radar coverage of the Middle East.

The station is located on the former Baronovsky Airfield (Russian: аэродром Бароновский) 3 kilometres (1.9 mi) south west of the village of Glubokiy and 12 kilometres (7.5 mi) south west of Armavir.

The station was described as starting to operate at the end of 2006 and then entering "experimental combat mode" in 2008. On the day in 2009 that Russia lost coverage from radars in Ukraine it was announced that it had "begun operations". In May 2012 it was announced that it would go on combat duty before the end of 2012. In December 2012 it was announced it will be in the first quarter of 2013. 6 June 2013 commissioned by order of the President Vladimir Putin visiting the Central Command Post of the Russian Armed Forces. Planned second segment, which will overlap zone of the Gabala radar station.

It was developed by NIIDAR (НИИДАР) and was built by Spetsstroy (Федеральное агентство специального строительства, also called Спецстрой России). Equipment installation was performed by Spetstehmontazh (Спецтехмонтаж).

== Voronezh radar ==
Voronezh radar are highly prefabricated radars needing fewer personnel and using less energy than previous generations. There are two in Armavir and they are described as Voronezh-DM, a UHF radar with a stated range of 4,200 kilometres (2,610 mi).

One of the radars, facing southwest, replaces the coverage lost by the dispute with Ukraine over the Dnepr radars in Mukachevo and Sevastopol. The other, facing south east, can replace the Daryal radar in Gabala although it is behind in construction.

Armavir, Gabala, Sevastopol and Mukachevo shown in European Russia.

== Armavir and Gabala ==
Data from Armavir, together with Gabala was offered to the United States as part of the negotiations over Russian opposition to US missile defence in Europe. Armavir is close to Iran, like Gabala, and also provides intelligence on missile activity in the Middle East.

Armavir cannot completely counter the loss of Gabala. Gabala is further south and has a longer range. Armavir may also be affected by the Caucasus Mountains.

In 2007 Vladimir Popovkin, then commander of the Russian Space Forces, said that Gabala, together with Balkhash in Kazakhstan and the two stations in Ukraine, cannot be relied upon as Russia cannot be sure it will have access to them in periods of international tension and war.

== 2013 ballistic launch in Mediterranean ==
On 3 September 2013 Armavir detected two US/Israeli ballistic test launches in the Mediterranean towards Syria.

== Russian Invasion of Ukraine ==
On 23 May 2024, the station was hit by Ukrainian drone attack.
