= Olenegorsk Radar Station =

Soviet radar station in Murmansk

Olenegorsk Radar Station
- Оленегорск РЛС
- Murmansk, NW Russia
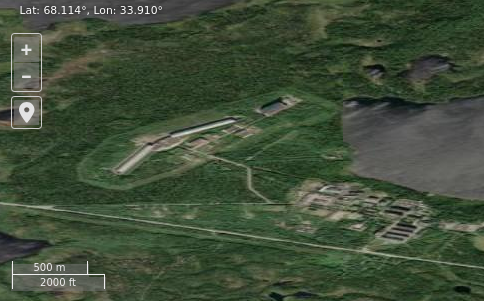
- Satellite imagery of Olenegorsk Radar Station. The Dnepr is the wide V-shaped building, and the Daugava is the block to the north east.

Site information
- Type: Radar Station
- Code: RO-1
- Owner: Russian Aerospace Forces
- Controlled by: Russian Space Forces
- Condition: operational

Location
- Olenegorsk in Russia
- Location within Russia
- Coordinates: 68.1141°N 33.9102°E

Site history
- Built: 1963–
- Built by: Soviet Union

Garrison information
- Garrison: 57th Independent Radio-Technical Unit

Olenegorsk Radar Station (also described as Olenegorsk-1 (Russian: Оленегорск-1) or Murmansk) is the site of a Soviet and Russian early warning radar. It is located near Olenegorsk on the Kola Peninsula, north of the Arctic Circle in north west Russia. It is considered to be a key part of the Russian early warning system against ballistic missile attack, and provides coverage of ballistic missile launches in the Norwegian Sea and North Sea. The station is operated by the Russian Space Forces.

The military townlet for the station is called Olenegorsk-1 and is at the village of Protoki (Russian: Протоки). The station is 19 kilometres (12 mi) east of Olenya airbase and 27 kilometres (17 mi) east of Olenegorsk. 6 kilometres (3.7 mi) to the south east there was a military tropospheric scatter radio relay station.

== Radar ==
Olenegorsk was the site of one of the first two early warning radars in the Soviet Union, the other being at Skrunda-1. The Dnestr-M radar (NATO codename: "Hen House") was started in 1963 and completed in 1969, entering service in 1971.

A Daugava radar (NATO codename:"Pechora") was later built next to it. This is a prototype Daryal receiver, a phased array receiver which worked with the Dnestr acting as a transmitter. The Daugava, which is still operational, was implemented in Olenegorsk to minimise interference caused by the Northern Lights.

== Voronezh ==
It is planned to replace the Dnestr-M/Daugava radars at Olenegorsk with the new generation of Russian early warning radar systems, the Voronezh radar. According to news reports a new Voronezh radar will start construction in 2017, replacing both existing radars.
