= Nurlan Iskakov =

Kazakh politician

- Нұрлан Ысқақов

Minister of Environment and Water
- In office 3 April 2006 – 4 March 2009
- President: Nursultan Nazarbayev
- Prime Minister: Karim Massimov; Daniyal Akhmetov
- Preceded by: Kamaltin Mukhamedzhanov
- Succeeded by: Nurgali Ashim

Personal details
- Born: 25 March 1963 (age 63) Kazakh SSR, Soviet Union
- Education: Satbayev University

Nurlan Abduldauly Iskakov (Kazakh: Нұрлан Әбділдаұлы Ысқақов, Nūrlan Äbdıldaūly Ysqaqov; born 25 March 1963) is a Kazakh politician who was the Minister of Environmental Protection in the Government of Kazakhstan.
