= Mishelyovka =

Mishelyovka Мишелёвка
- Urban-type settlement
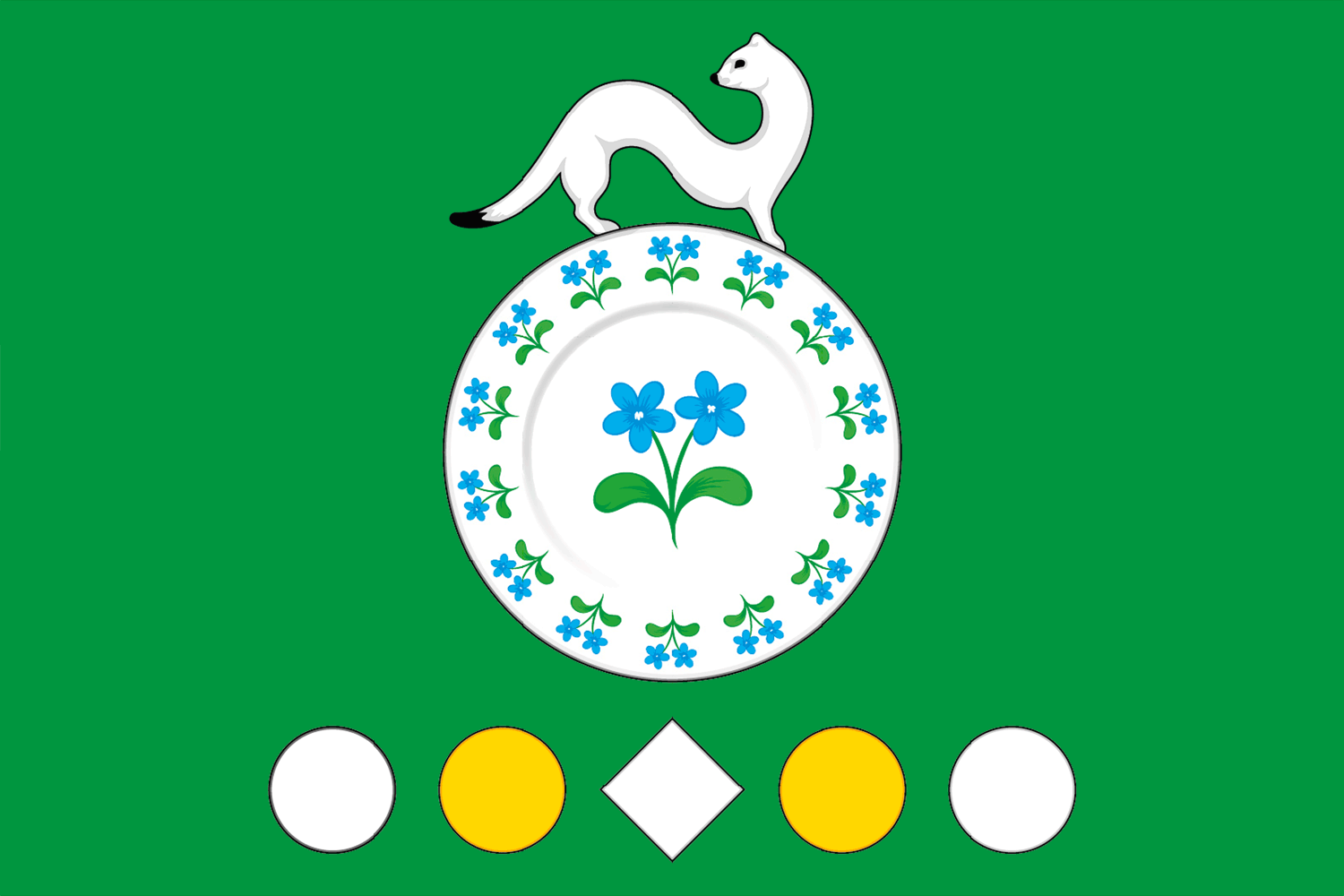
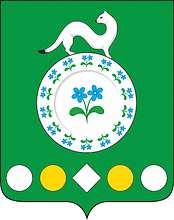
- Flag Coat of arms
- Interactive map of Mishelyovka
- Location of Mishelyovka Mishelyovka (Irkutsk Oblast)
- Coordinates: 52.8646°N 103.1859°E
- Country: Russia
- Federal subject: Irkutsk Oblast
- Administrative district: Usolsky District
- Elevation: 453 m (1,486 ft)

Population (2010 Census)
  - Total: 7,789
  - Estimate (2025): 4,459 (−42.8%)
- Time zone: UTC+8 (MSK+5)
- Postal code: 665474
- OKTMO ID: 25640155051

Mishelyovka (Russian: Мишелёвка) is an urban locality (an urban-type settlement) in Usolsky District of Irkutsk Oblast, Russia. Population: 7,789 (2010 census); 7,729 (2002 census); 9,288 (1989 Soviet census).
