= Baranavichy Radar Station =

Russian radar station in Belarus

Baranavichy Radar Station
- Belarusian: Вузел «Баранавічы»
- Belarus
- Volga radar at Ozerechye

Site information
- Type: Radar station
- Controlled by: Russian Space Forces
- Open to the public: No
- Condition: Operational

Location
- Hantsavichy located in Belarus
- Location within Belarus
- Coordinates: 52.834725°N 26.475058°E

Site history
- Built: 1982
- Built by: Soviet Union / Russia
- In use: Since 2003

Garrison information
- Garrison: 474th independent Radio-Technical Unit

Baranavichy Radar Station (Russian: Узел «Барановичи») (sometimes wrongly named Gantsavichy (Note: The names vary as the station may be wrongly named after the nearby town of Hantsavichy, but with different transliterations depending on whether we consider the name to be Russian or Belarusian. The character Г is a G in Russian and an H in Belarusian. Using the BGN/PCGN Romanisation standard the Belarusian name Га́нцавічы would be written as Hantsavichy and using Wikipedia's Russian Romanisation standard the Russian name Ганцевичи would be written as Gantsevichi)) is a 70M6 Volga-type radar in Ozerechye near Hantsavichy in Belarus (48 km from Baranavichy). It is an early warning radar, which is run by the Russian Space Forces. It is designed to identify launches of ballistic missiles from western Europe and can also track some artificial satellites, partly replacing the demolished radar station at Skrunda in Latvia.

== History ==
The Volga was developed by NIIDAR from the Dunay-3U radar. Construction started in 1982 to counter the installation of Pershing II missiles in West Germany which were only 6 to 8 minutes away in flight time. These intermediate missiles were eliminated by the Intermediate-Range Nuclear Forces Treaty, which was signed in December 1987.

Work still continued on the radar even though the Pershing missiles had been removed. The radar was not compliant with the 1972 ABM treaty as this forbade multifunction radars. The Volga was in breach of this as it was designed to guide anti-ballistic missiles (an 'ABM radar') as well as acting as an early warning radar. As the United States had managed to get the Daryal radar at Yeniseysk demolished for being in breach of the treaty the Soviet Union removed ABM radar abilities from the Volga as it was being built.

Work on the radar stopped in 1991 when the Soviet Union collapsed. It restarted in 1993 once it became apparent that Russia would lose the early warning station in Skrunda and with it coverage of missiles from the north west. Some testing took place in 1994 and in 1995 a 25-year agreement was signed between Russia and Belarus giving Russia a 25-year lease on the ground and all buildings with no taxes and with no charge made for communication channels. The lease was extended in 2021. When the Dnestr-M radars in Skrunda were shut down in 1998 Russia restarted the construction of the Volga. Test operations started in 1999 and pilot operations in 2002. It was finally commissioned on 1 October 2003. The radar was upgraded in 2016.

One of the manufacturers was quoted as saying that two other Volga installations were once planned - one at Komsomolsk-na-Amur and one at Sevastopol. Another source says that a Volga was originally planned in Biysk in Altai Krai to provide coverage of China.

== Volga radar ==
The station, classed as a 'Volga' type, is similar to a Daryal radar but operates on the UHF band rather than the VHF of the Daryal. Like the Daryal it has a separate transmitter and receiver stations which in the case of the Volga are 3 kilometres (1.9 mi) apart.

The radar has an Active Electronically Scanned Array, a type of phased array. It continuously radiates such that it is receiving and transmitting at the same time. The array consists of spiral radiators which rotate in different directions in the receiver and transmitter. The transmitter array is 36 by 20 metres (118 ft × 66 ft) and the receiver array is 36 by 36 metres (118 ft × 118 ft). Both arrays are surrounded by a ferrite frame which absorbs radio waves.

The Volga has a range of around 2,000 kilometres (1,200 mi) and an azimuth of 120°, with elevation of 4° to 70°. Its GRAU index is 70M6 .

== The site ==
The radar is 8 km north east of Hantavichy and 48 kilometres (30 mi) from Baranavichy, in Ozerechye. The military townlet for the personnel of the radar used to be called Kletsk-2 (Russian: Клецк-2).

Coordinates	Azimuth	Type	Built
52°49′59.95″N 26°28′31.83″E receiver 52°51′41.98″N 26°28′2.88″E transmitter	262.5°	Volga	1985–2002

When the station opened it was stated that up to 200 local Belarusians could be employed there. In 2007 Kommersant estimated that 600 people worked at the station.

== See also ==
- Russian military presence in Belarus
- Vileyka VLF transmitter
