= Balkhash Radar Station =

Radar station in Kazakhstan

Balkhash Radar Station
- Балхаш РЛС
- Sary Shagan, Kazakhstan
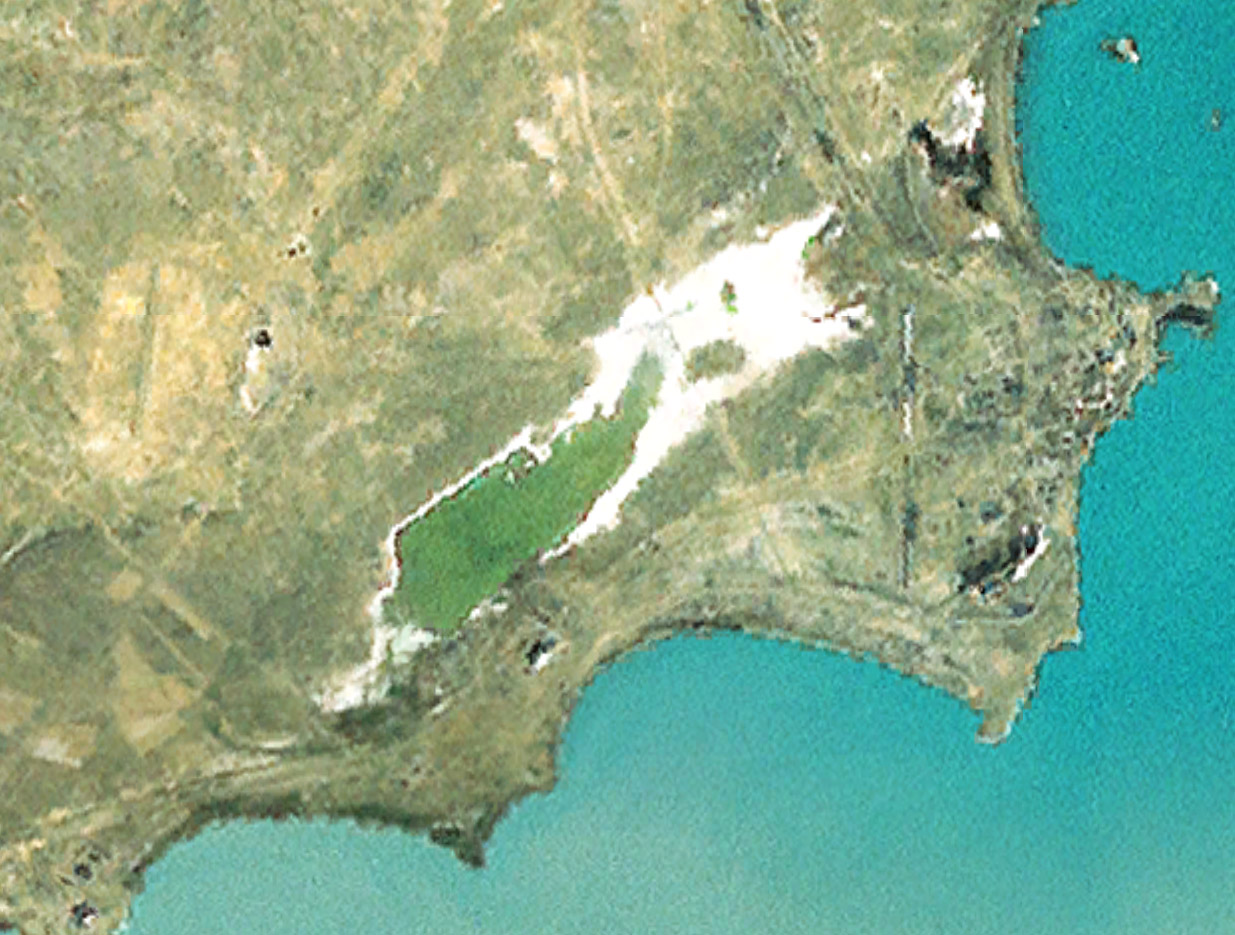
- An image of the site from landsat. The Dnepr radar is a V bottom right and the Daryal radar bottom left.

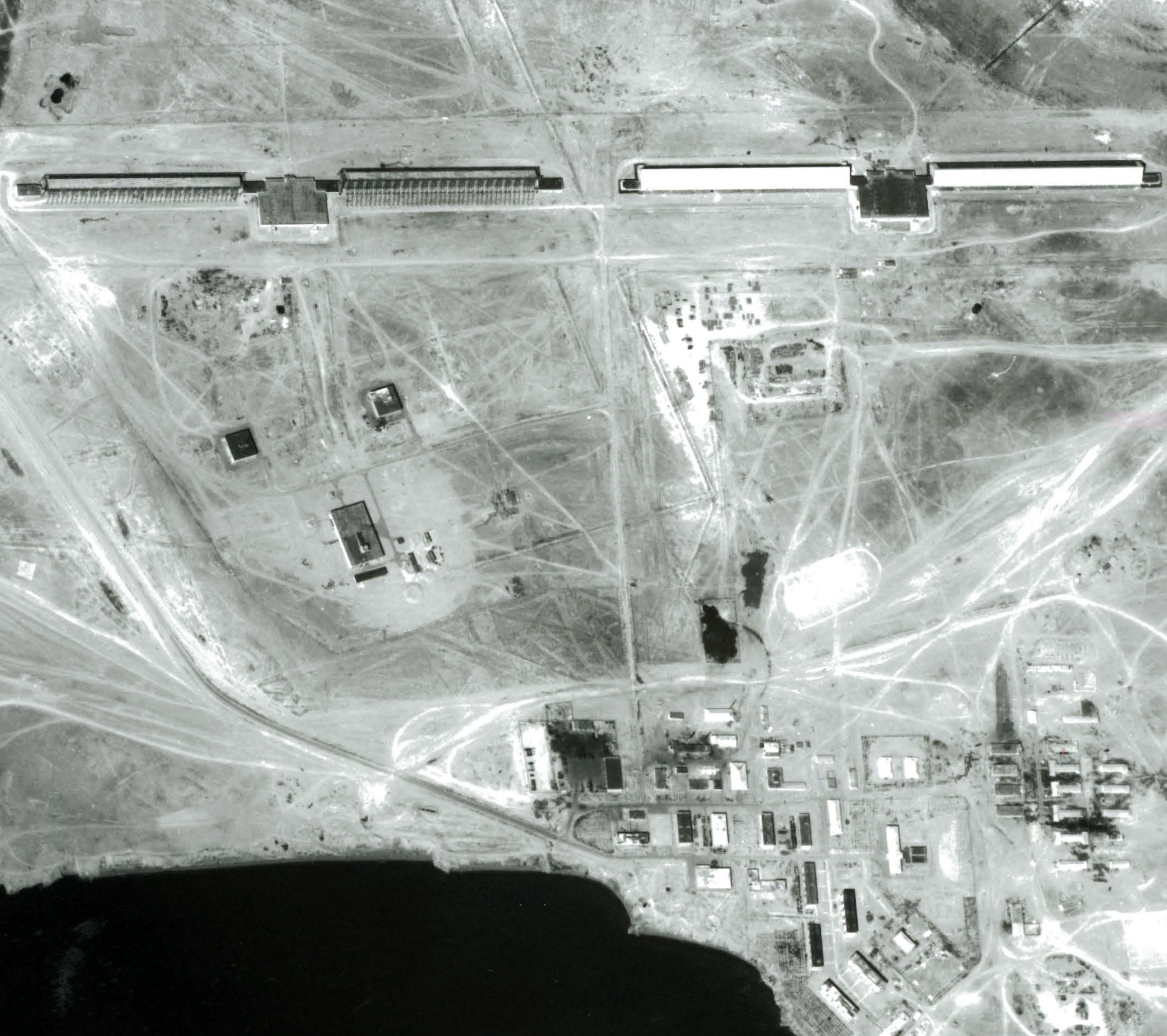
- Dnestr radars 1 and 2 taken by US spy satellite KH-7 in 1967. The town of Balkhash-9 is in the foreground.

Site information
- Type: Radar Station
- Code: OS-2
- Owner: Russian Aerospace Forces
- Controlled by: Russian Space Forces
- Open to the public: no
- Condition: out of service

Location
- Balkhash in Kazakhstan
- Location within Kazakhstan
- Coordinates: 46.603076°N 74.530985°E

Site history
- Built: 1964-
- Built by: Soviet Union

Garrison information
- Garrison: 46th Independent Radio-Technical Unit

Balkhash Radar Station (also described as Sary Shagan radar node and Balkhash-9) is the site of two generations of Soviet and Russian early warning radars. It is located on the west coast of Lake Balkhash near Sary Shagan test site in Kazakhstan. Although it was used for monitoring satellites in low Earth orbit it was mainly a key part of the Russian system of warning against missile attack. It provided coverage of western and central China, India, Pakistan and submarine missile launches in the Bay of Bengal. There have been six radars at this site, the last one was removed from service on 1 June 2020, and it was run by the Russian Space Forces.

The military townlet for the station is called Balkhash-9 (Russian: Балхаш-9). The station is 13 kilometres (8.1 mi) east of the village of Gulshat in Karagandy Province and 90 kilometres (56 mi) north east of Priozersk, the main town for Sary Shagan.

== Space surveillance ==
Balkhash was founded as OS-2, a space surveillance site with four Dnestr (NATO codename "Hen House") radar stations, which were started in 1964 and tested in 1968. It could detect satellites at an altitude of up to 3,000 kilometres (1,864 mi). The prototype Dnestr radar, TsSO-P, was built nearby on the Sary Shagan test site 46°00′04.65″N 73°38′52.11″E.

In 1967-8 a Dnepr early warning radar was started adjacent to the 4 Dnestr radars and it was commissioned in the early 1970s.

The Dnepr radar was the last functioning radar on the site.

Radar	Coordinates	Azimuth	Type	Built	Details
Radar 1	46.60741°N 74.523304°E	270	Dnestr	1964-1970	Modernised to Dnestr-M. Operation 1970. Decommissioned September 1995. Derelict.
Radar 2	46.614574°N 74.523132°E	270	Dnestr	1964-1968	Operational 1968. Decommissioned January 1984. Derelict.
Radar 3	46.625333°N 74.51721°E	60	Dnestr	1964-1968	Operational 1968. Decommissioned January 1984. Derelict.
Radar 4	46.631463°N 74.512618°E	60	Dnestr	1964-1968	Operational 1968. Decommissioned September 1988. Derelict.
Radar 5	46.603076°N 74.530985°E	180, 124	Dnepr	1968-1972	Operational 1972. Modernised to Dnepr. Operational from 1974. Removed from combat alert in June 2020.

== Second generation Daryal radar ==
Balkhash had a Daryal-U radar (NATO codename "Pechora"), a bistatic phased-array early warning radar consisting of two separate large phased-array antennas 2.7 kilometres (2 mi) apart. The transmitter array was 30 by 40 metres (98 ft × 131 ft) and the receiver was 80 by 80 metres (260 ft × 260 ft) in size. The system is a VHF system operating at a wavelength of 1.5 to 2 meters (150 to 200 MHz). The claimed range of a Daryal installation is 6,000 kilometres (3,728 mi).

Originally, at least seven Daryal facilities were planned, however, only the first two facilities completed, Pechora and Gabala, were ever operational. Two Daryal-U type were to be built at Balkhash and Mishelevka, Irkutsk, neither were completed before the collapse of the Soviet Union.

Coordinates	Azimuth	Type	Built
46°35′19.48″N 74°27′59.19″E transmitter 46°36′2.70″N 74°29′51.67″E receiver	152° (estimated)	Daryal-U	1982-1994

The Balkhash Daryal started in 1982. Some testing started in 1991 and then stopped in 1994. In 2002 the never operational radar transferred to Kazakhstan who were left with the responsibility to demolish it. The radar was heavily looted and the receiver building ("building no. 2") burnt down in September 2004. It further collapsed whilst being looted in January 2010, killing one.

The Daryal contained organic pollutant polychlorinated biphenyl in its capacitors. The Kazakh government allocated $7 million to dispose of these and former Kazakh environment minister Nurlan Iskakov was convicted of embezzlement and sentenced to four years in prison relating to this money in 2009.
