= Daryal radar =

Soviet and Russian early warning radar

Daryal
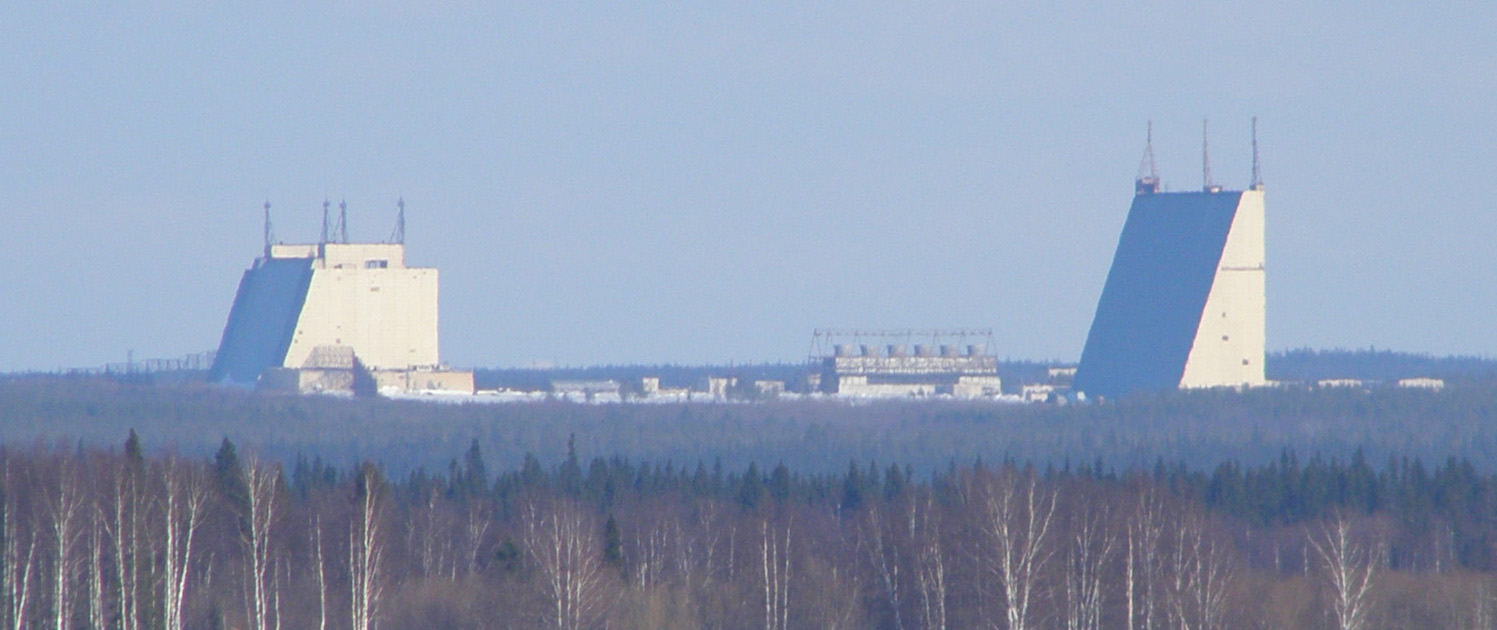
- Daryal radar in Pechora
- Country of origin: Soviet Union, Russia
- Introduced: 1984
- No. built: 8 planned, 2 operational
- Type: Early-warning radar
- Frequency: 150–200 MHz (VHF)
- Range: Around 6,000 kilometres (3,728 mi)
- Diameter: Transmitter 30×40 m Receiver 80×80 m separated by 0.5–1.5 km
- Azimuth: 90°
- Elevation: 40°
- Other names: NATO: Pechora; GRAU: 5N79, 90N6.

The Daryal-type radar (Russian: Дарьял) (NATO: Pechora) is a Soviet bistatic early-warning radar. It consists of two separate large active phased-array antennas separated by around 500 metres (1,640 ft) to 1.5 kilometres (4,921 ft). The transmitter array is 30 m × 40 m (98 ft × 131 ft) and the receiver is 80 m × 80 m (260 ft × 260 ft) in size. The system is a VHF system operating at a wavelength of 1.5 to 2 meters (150 to 200 MHz). Its initial transmit capacity was 50 MW with a target capacity of 350 MW.

The designer of the radars, RTI Mints, says that each Daryal receiver is 100 × 100 m and has 4,000 cross dipoles. Each transmitter is 40 × 40 m with 1,260 modules, each capable of 300 kW. They say the radar has a range of 6,000 km with targets between 0.1 and 0.12 m^{2}. It can track 20 objects at the same time and can cope with four jamming sources. The designer, Viktor Ivantsov, was awarded the title "Hero of Labour" for his work on the Daryal.

The first Daryal type radar was an active electronically scanned array built at Olenegorsk in 1977. It was the receiver building only and was called a Daugava rather than a Daryal. It used the transmitter of the adjacent Dnestr-M radar. Following this two Daryal radars were constructed in Pechora (1983) and Qabala (1985). New Daryal-U radars were planned for Balkhash-9 near Sary Shagan in Kazakhstan, Mishelevka near Irkutsk and Yeniseysk-15 near Krasnoyarsk in Siberia. Two Daryal-UM systems were to be constructed in Skrunda, Latvia, and Mukachevo, Ukraine.

Originally, at least seven Daryal facilities were planned, however, only the first two facilities completed, named Pechora and Gabala, were ever operational.

The American Clinton administration offered financial assistance in completing the Mishelevka facility in exchange for amending the Anti-Ballistic Missile Treaty to allow US deployment of a national missile defense system. Russia rejected this proposal and in 2002 the US unilaterally withdrew from the ABM treaty. The Mukachevo one in Ukraine was never completed after the fall of the Soviet Union and the Skrunda facility was demolished by a newly independent Latvia, arranged by the US Department of Defence. The Yeniseysk (Krasnoyarsk) Daryal-U site caused concern in the West over compliance with the ABM Treaty during its construction in the 1980s. Article VI(b) requires radars to be on the periphery of national territory and to face outwards whereas the Yeniseysk radar faced over Siberia. Following negotiations, in September 1989 the Soviets admitted it was a violation of the treaty, construction ceased and the facility was eventually dismantled.

== Variants ==
The prototype Daryal receiver is called a Daugava (5U83) and works with a Dnestr-M transmitter. It is half the size of the Daryal receivers but has the same equipment and computer systems.

The original Daryal (5N79) was improved by revisions Daryal-U (90N6) and Daryal-UM. A Daryal-U had half the transmitters of a Daryal. The Volga radar (70M6) is a Daryal-like radar operating on a decimeter wavelength (UHF) rather than the meter wavelength (VHF) of the Daryal. It was originally planned that there would be a number of these to complement the Daryal. The only Volga built is the one at Baranavichy which originally started in 1982, stopped in the early 1990s, restarted in 1999 and became operational in 2003.

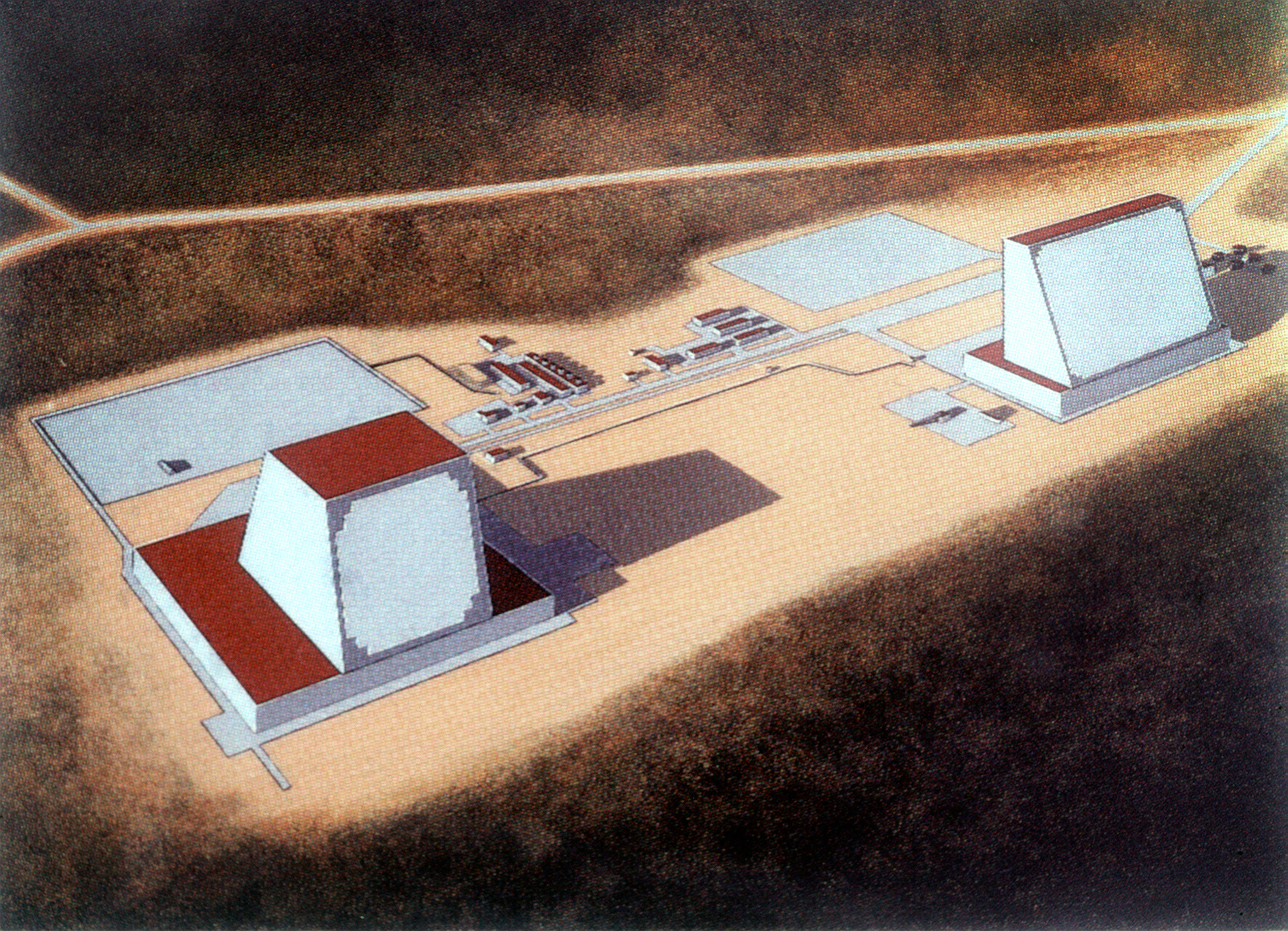
A US military artist's concept of a Daryal facility - transmitter on the left, receiver on the right

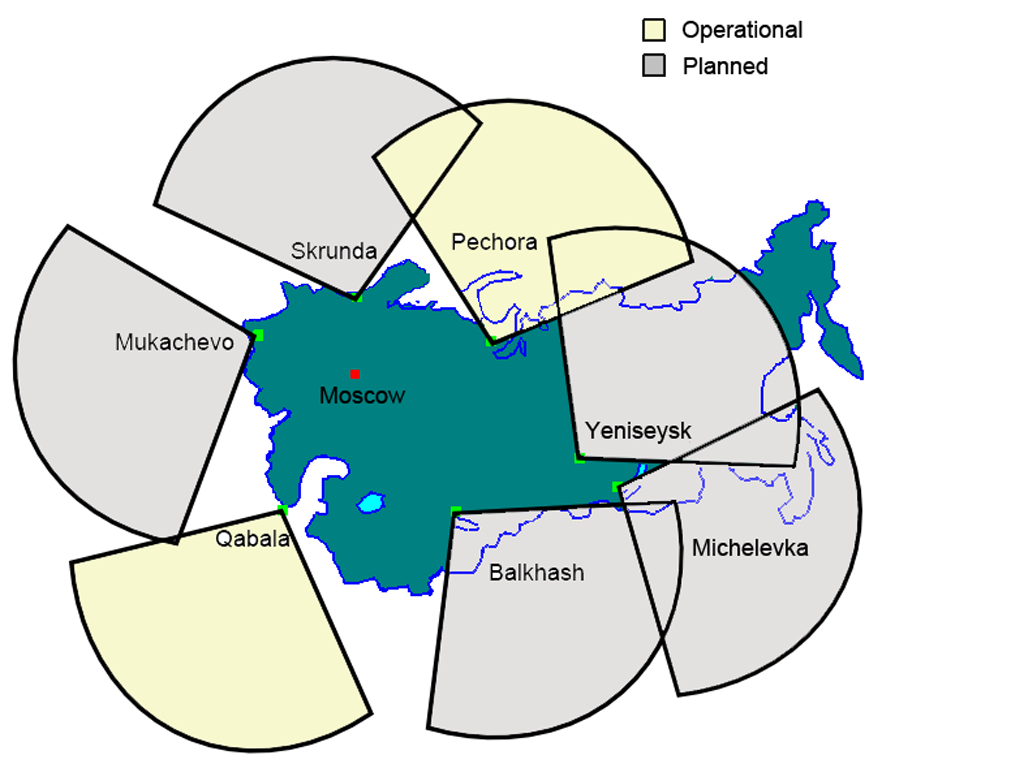
Planned and operational Daryal radars

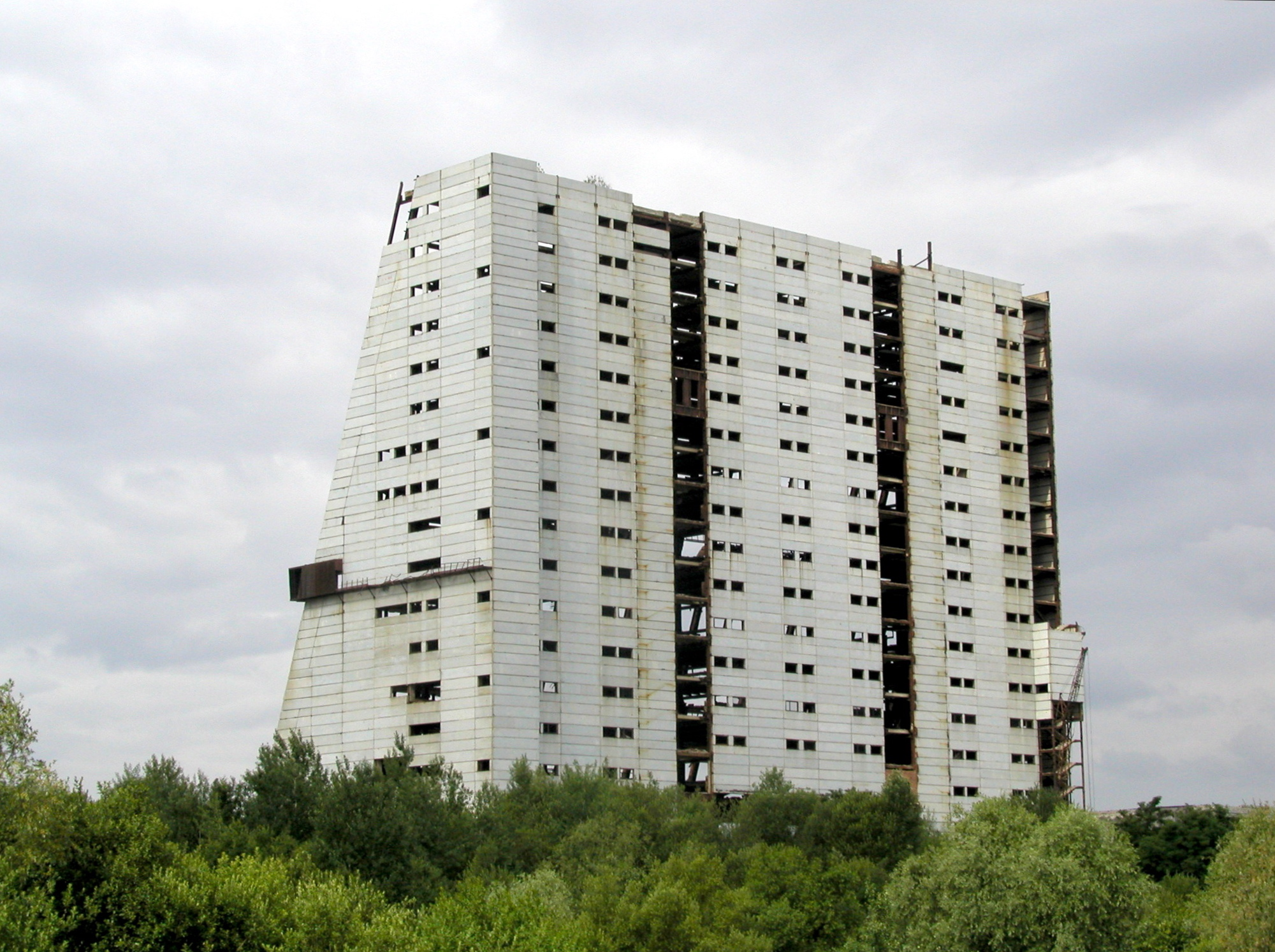
Ruin of Daryal-UM radar at Mukachevo Radar Station, Ukraine (2003)

== Locations ==
Designation	Location	Coordinates	Azimuth	Type	Built	Details
RO-1	Olenegorsk-1, Olenegorsk, Kola Peninsula, Russia	68°6′59.63″N 33°55′8.69″E receiver	308°	Daugava	1975–1977	Uses the Dnestr-M radar as transmitter. Operational.
RO-2	Skrunda-1, Latvia	56°43′40.92″N 21°58′58.10″E receiver	308°	Daryal-UM	1986–1991	Demolished 1995.
-	Hantsavichy Radar Station (often listed as Baranavichy), Kleck-2, Belarus	52°49′59.95″N 26°28′31.83″E transmitter 52°51′41.98″N 26°28′2.88″E receiver	262.5°	Volga	1986–2003	In operation.
RO-5	Mukachevo Radar Station, Ukraine	48°23′6.56″N 22°48′1.72″E transmitter 48°23′18.41″N 22°47′37.71″E receiver	218°	Daryal-UM	1986–1991	Demolished 2011.
RO-7	Gabala Radar Station, Qabala, Azerbaijan	40°52′16.62″N 47°48′32.25″E transmitter 40°52′4.54″N 47°47′44.60″E receiver	162°	Daryal	1977–1985	Halted in 2012.
RO-30	Pechora Radar Station, Pechora, Komi Republic, Russia	65°12′36.59″N 57°17′43.38″E transmitter 65°12′36.55″N 57°16′34.68″E receiver	2° (estimated)	Daryal	1975–1984	In operation.
OS-1	Mishelevka Radar Station, Usolye-Sibirskoye, Irkutsk, Russia	52°51′20.11″N 103°13′53.94″E transmitter 52°51′42.02″N 103°14′20.49″E receiver	135°	Daryal-U	1979–1984	Demolished 2011. Replaced by a Voronezh radar.
OS-2	Balkhash Radar Station, Sary Shagan, Kazakhstan	46°35′19.48″N 74°27′59.19″E transmitter 46°36′2.70″N 74°29′51.67″E receiver	152° (estimated)	Daryal-U	1984–1992	Receiver destroyed by fire 2004, ruined 2010.
OS-3	Yeniseysk-15, Krasnoyarsk, Russia	57°52′5.67″N 93°7′7.26″E transmitter 57°52′24.22″N 93°6′28.09″E receiver	40° (estimated)	Daryal-U	1983–1987	Halted in 1989 and dismantled.
