= Mukachevo Radar Station =

Former Soviet radar station in Ukraine

Mukachevo radar station
- Shipka, Mukachevo, Ukraine
- Map of Mukachevo Dnepr

Site information
- Type: Radar station
- Code: RO-5

Location
- Map of Ukraine showing the location of Mukachevo
- Location within Ukraine
- Coordinates: 48.37768°N 22.70744°E
- Height: 75 metres (246 ft)

Site history
- Built: 1970s
- Built by: Soviet Union

Mukachevo radar station is a Ukrainian radar station, originally built during the Soviet period for providing early warning of ballistic missile attack. Currently it is the property of the State Space Agency of Ukraine. It is located in Shipka in the far south west of Ukraine and was part of the Soviet, and then Russian missile attack warning system. Information from this station could be used for a launch on warning nuclear missile attack or to engage the A-135 anti-ballistic missile system.

== Radar ==
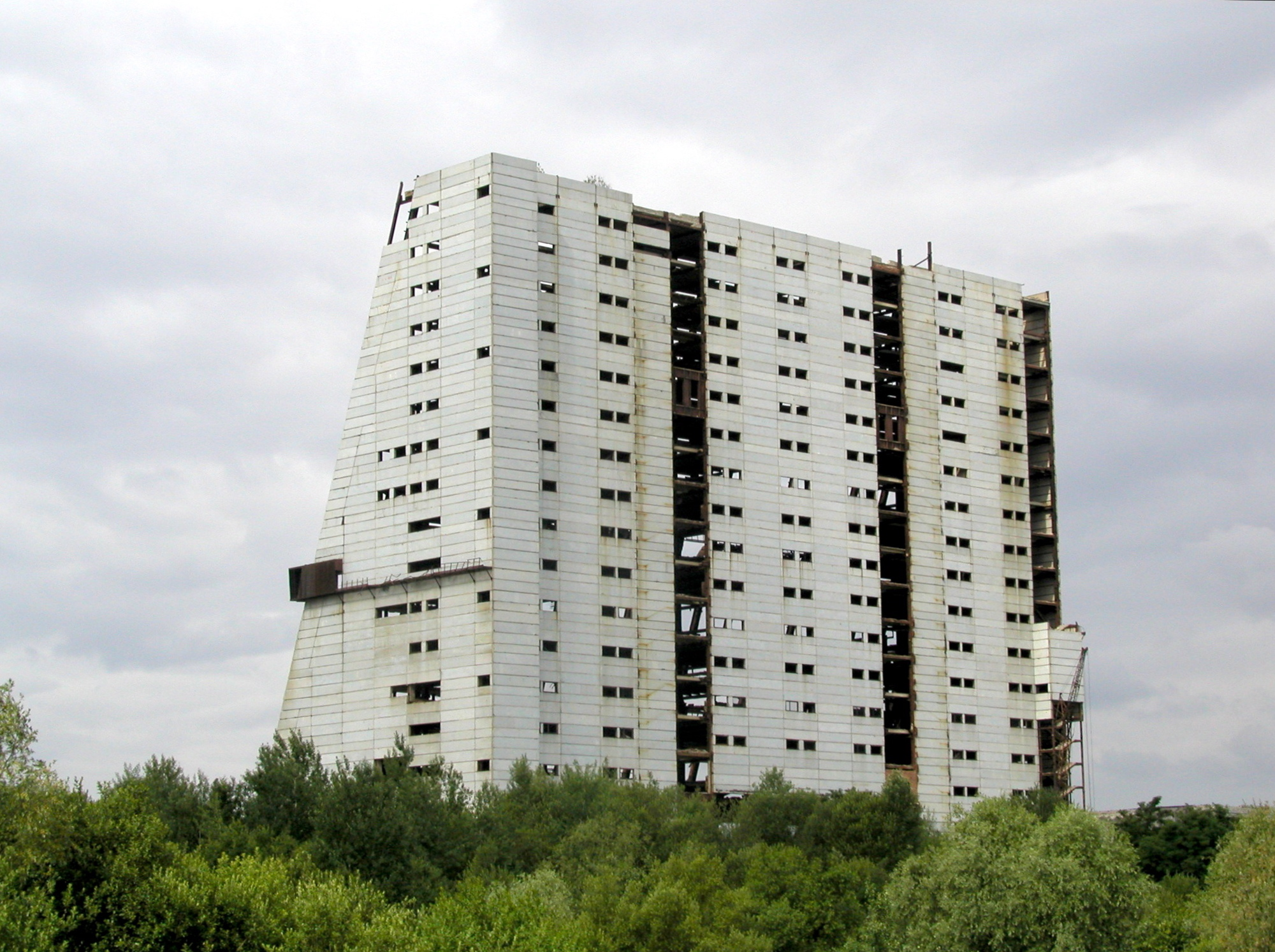
Daryal-UM receiver building in 2003

The radar is a Dnepr (NATO name: HEN HOUSE) phased array radar, and was the last one of this type to be built by the Soviet Union. It consists of a central building and two long wings over 250 metres long; each wing is a separate radar array. One had an azimuth of 196° (south west) and the other 260° (facing west). The radar had a range of 3,000 kilometres (1,864 mi).

The radar started to be built in the early 1970s. Some sources say that it started operating in 1977, others say it became operational on 16 January 1979.

A second generation radar, a Daryal-UM, was started at a different location outside of Mukacheve, 6.7 kilometres (4.2 mi) away, north of the village of Pistryalovo. It was planned that this would replace the Dnepr but construction stopped in 1991, when the Soviet Union collapsed, and never restarted. The Daryal has separate receiver and transmitter buildings, at Mukachevo they are 630 metres (2,070 ft) apart. The transmitter building is ruined, was being demolished in autumn 2011, and is at 48°23′6.56″N 22°48′1.72″E. The larger receiver building has been demolished and was located at 48°23′18.41″N 22°47′37.71″E. The azimuth of the Daryal was 218° (south west).

== Dispute with Ukraine ==
In 1991 the Soviet Union collapsed and the station ended up in the newly independent country of Ukraine, together with the radar in Sevastopol. Russia signed a 15-year agreement with Ukraine in 1992 to rent both radars for US$840,000 per year. Unlike other overseas stations, the station was to be staffed by Ukrainian personnel, rather than Russian. In 2005, management of the radars was transferred from the military to the civil Ukrainian National Space Agency and the lease increased to US$1.3 million, although the Ukrainian government had asked for more.

In 2008, Russia decided to stop using the two Ukrainian radar stations. According to some commentators, this was partly due to the then Ukrainian government's stated intention to join NATO. In 2007, Vladimir Popovkin had stated that Russia intended to duplicate or replace foreign radar stations, as it could not rely on them in times of crisis. Replacing the station would reduce any leverage Ukraine was gaining over Russia from the ability to control access to the data.

Pragmatic reasons were given for ending the lease. Popovkin said that the radars went out of warranty in 2005, and would cost $20m to modernize. In addition, Russia pointed out that the data from Sevastopol was unreliable due to pirate radio broadcasts from fishing boats in the Black Sea. Furthermore, it had concerns with the quality of the data due to the civilian rather than military operators.

Data from Ukraine stopped on 26 February 2009 and Russia declared that a new Voronezh radar station in Armavir had begun operation on the same date, replacing the lost coverage. Following this, the Ukrainian government announced that the stations would be closed for a month for maintenance and then used part-time for space surveillance as part of an organization called SKAKO (Automatic System of Control and Analysis of Outer Space).

== See also ==
- Mukachevo (air base)
- Shipka (military base)
