= Mishelevka Radar Station =

Soviet radar station in Irkutsk Oblast, Siberia

Mishelevka Radar Station
- Мишелёвка РЛС
- Mishelyovka Usolye-Sibirskoye, Irkutsk Oblast, Siberia
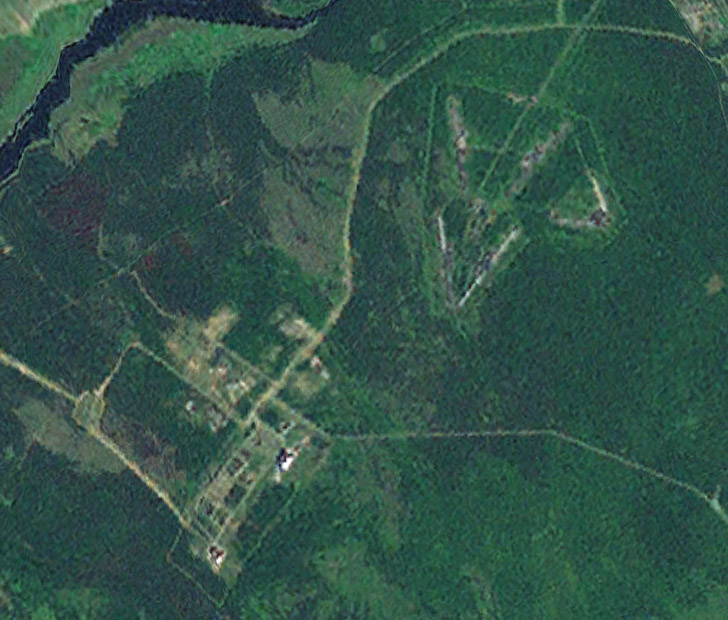
- An image of the site from landsat. The 4 Dnestr radar and 1 Dnepr radars are upper right and the Daryal radar lower left.

Site information
- Type: Radar Station
- Code: OS-1
- Owner: Russian Aerospace Forces
- Controlled by: Russian Space Forces
- Open to the public: no
- Condition: operational

Location
- Mishelevka in Russia.
- Location within Russia
- Coordinates: 52.8555°N 103.2317°E

Site history
- Built: 1964–2014
- Built by: Soviet Union/Russia

Garrison information
- Garrison: 46th Independent Radio-Technical Unit

Mishelevka Radar Station is the site of three generations of Soviet and Russian early warning radars. It is located in Irkutsk Oblast in Siberia and provides coverage of China and missile launches from submarines in the Pacific Ocean. There have been seven radars at this site and it is run by the Russian Space Forces. In 2012 a new Voronezh-M radar is being built at the site.

Mishelyovka is a village in southern Siberia and the station is 4 kilometres (2 mi) east of the village and 28 kilometres (17 mi) northwest of the town of Usolye-Sibirskoye. The military townlet for the station is called Usolye-Sibirskoye-7 (Russian: Усо́лье-Сиби́рское-7).

== Space surveillance ==
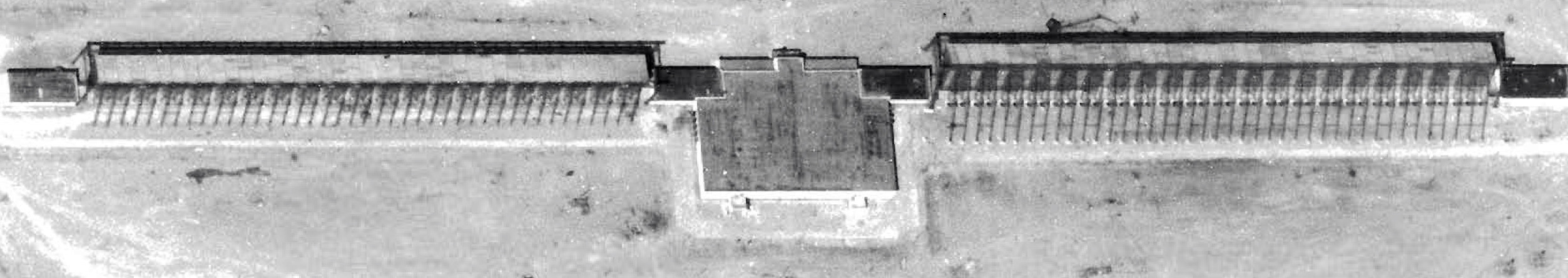
A Dnestr space surveillance radar from US spy satellite KH-7, 1967

Mishelevka was founded as OS-1, a space surveillance site with four Dnestr radar, which were started in 1964 and tested in 1968. It could detect satellites at an altitude of up to 3,000 kilometres (1,864 mi).

In 1967-8 a Dnepr early warning radar was started adjacent to the 4 Dnestr radars and it was commissioned in 1976.

Radar	Coordinates	Azimuth	Type	Built	Details
Radar 1	52.877574°N 103.273323°E	135	Dnestr	1964–1976	Modernised to Dnestr-M and then Dnepr late 70s. Operational
Radar 2	52.881511°N 103.266027°E	135	Dnestr	1964–1970	Modernised to Dnestr-M. Decommissioned 1990s. Now derelict.
Radar 3	52.883013°N 103.258045°E	265	Dnestr	1964–1968	Modernised to Dnestr-M. Used for research since 1993 – now an incoherent scatter radar
Radar 4	52.875787°N 103.256414°E	265	Dnestr	1964–1968	Modernised to Dnestr-M. Decommissioned 1990s. Now derelict.
Radar 5	52.874829°N 103.260791°E	70, 200	Dnepr	1967–1972	Modernised to Dnepr 1976. Operational

One of the Dnestr space surveillance radars is now used as an incoherent scatter radar by the Institute of Solar-Terrestrial Physics, part of the Russian Academy of Sciences.

== Second generation Daryal radar ==
Mishelevka had a Daryal-U radar, a bistatic phased-array early warning radar consisting of two separate large phased-array antennas separated by around 500 metres (1,640 ft) to 1.5 kilometres (4,921 ft). The transmitter array was 30 by 40 metres (98 ft × 131 ft) and the receiver was 80 by 80 metres (260 ft × 260 ft) in size. The system is a VHF system operating at a wavelength of 1.5 to 2 meters (150 to 200 MHz). The claimed range of a Daryal installation is 6,000 kilometres (3,728 mi).

Two Daryal-U type radars were to be built at sites in Balkhash and Mishelevka, Irkutsk, neither were completed. In 1999 the American Clinton administration offered financial assistance in completing the Mishelevka facility in exchange for amending the ABM treaty to allow US deployment of a national missile defense system. Russia rejected this proposal and in 2002 the US unilaterally withdrew from the ABM treaty.

The Mishelevka Daryal was started in 1979 and construction ended in 1984. The transmitter building was at 52°51′20.11″N 103°13′53.94″E and the receiver at 52°51′42.02″N 103°14′20.49″E. It was never operational and was demolished in 2011.

== Third generation Voronezh radar ==
The Daryal radar was demolished on 23 June 2011 to enable the construction of a new Voronezh radar. There are going to be two radar faces on the site to replace the two Dnepr radars which, as of 2012, are still operational. Once complete the MoD say that the radar will have coverage of 240°.

Voronezh radar are highly prefabricated radars needing fewer personnel and using less energy than previous generations. The ones being built in Mishelevka are Voronezh-M, also described as Voronezh-VP, a VHF radar with a stated range of 4,200 kilometres (2,610 mi). The VP stands for high potential and may reflect that it has six segments, rather than the three of other Voronezh VHF radars.

The first face of the new radar was announced as undergoing testing in March 2012. In May 2012 it was announced that it had entered "experimental combat duty". Fully operational in 2014.
