= Dnestr radar =

Soviet and Russian early warning radars

Dnestr/Dnestr-M/Dnepr
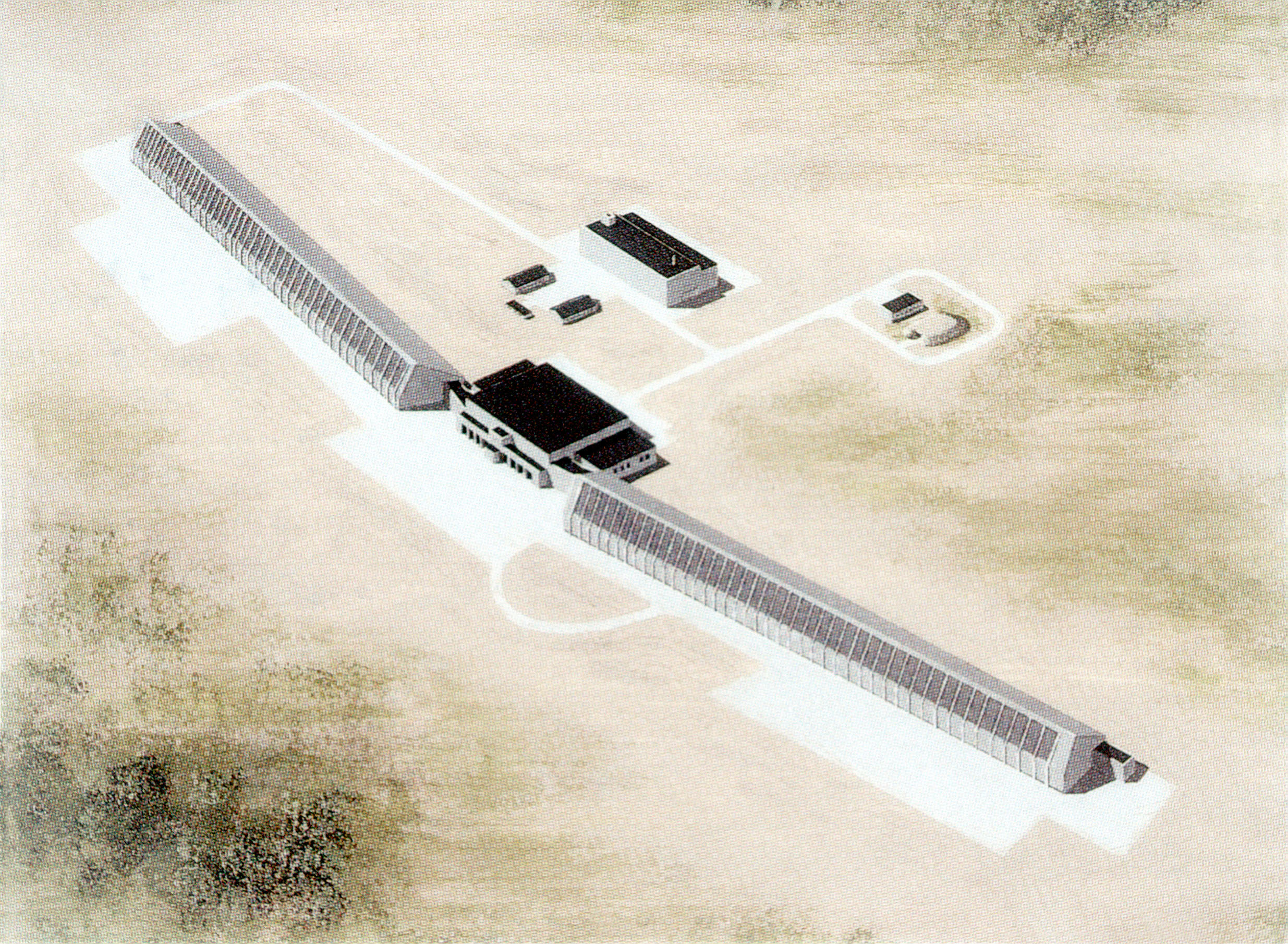
- A US military artist's concept of a Dnestr-M/Dnepr
- Country of origin: Soviet Union, Russia
- Designer: Mints Radiotechnical Institute
- Introduced: 1963 (Dnestr-M)
- No. built: 15
- Type: Space surveillance (Dnestr); Early warning radar (Dnestr-M, Dnepr, Dnepr-M)
- Frequency: 154–162 MHz (VHF)
- Beamwidth: 0.5°(N-S), 10°(E-W)
- Pulsewidth: 0.8 ms long
- Range: 3,000 kilometres (1,864 mi) 1,900 kilometres (1,181 mi) for targets with an area of 1 m2
- Diameter: Each array is 244 metres (801 ft) long, 20 metres (66 ft) high and 12 metres (39 ft) wide
- Azimuth: 30°, 30 per transmitter giving 120 in total
- Elevation: 5° to 35°
- Precision: ± 1 km range, 10 min azimuth, 50 min elevation, 5 m/s range rate
- Power: Peak power of 1.25 MW per transmitter Radiating power 200 kW; Consumed power 2100 kW
- Other names: NATO: Hen House; GRAU: 5N15 (Dnestr), 5N15M (Dnestr-M), 5N86 (Dnepr)

Dnestr radar (Russian: Днестр) and Dnepr radar (Russian: Днепр), both known by the NATO reporting name Hen House, (Note: NATO gave these the code name "Hen House" presumably because they looked like chicken coops, according to Forden.) are the first generation of Soviet space surveillance and early warning radars. Six radars of this type were built on the periphery of the Soviet Union starting in the 1960s to provide ballistic missile warnings for attacks from different directions. They were the primary Soviet early warning radars for much of the later Cold War. In common with other Soviet and Russian early warning radars they are named after rivers, the Dnestr and the Dnepr. (Note: Other examples are Voronezh radar named after the Voronezh River, the Don-2N radar named after the Don river and the Dunay radars named after the Dunay (Danube).)

The Dnestr/Dnepr radars were intended to be replaced by the newer Daryal radars starting in the 1990s. Only two of the planned Daryal radars became operational, due to issues such as the dissolution of the Soviet Union. As of 2012, the Russian early warning network still consists of some radars of this vintage. It is likely that all the existing radars will be replaced by the third generation Voronezh radars by 2020.

== TsSO-P ==
The Dnestr radar came from work on ballistic missile defence undertaken in the late 1950s and early 1960s. System A, the prototype for the A-35 anti-ballistic missile system, was set up in the Sary Shagan testing grounds, in the Kazakh SSR. Work on the system was led by design bureau KB-1 which proposed using VHF radar RTN (Russian: РТН) and the Dunay-2 UHF radar. Other alternatives were sought from Soviet industry and RTI proposed using VHF radar TsSO-P (Russian: ЦСО-П) and UHF radar TsSS-30 (Russian: ЦСС-30).

TsSO-P (standing for Russian: центральная станция обнаружения – полигонная meaning central detection station – test site) was selected for further development, together with the Dunay-2. TsSO-P had a long horn antenna 250 metres (820 ft) long and 15 metres (49 ft) high. It had an array with an open ribbed structure and used 200 microseconds pulses. Hardware methods were designed for signal processing as the intended M-4 computer could not run the necessary computations. It was built at area 8 in Sary Shagan and was located at 46°00′04.65″N 73°38′52.11″E. It first detected an object on 17 September 1961.

TsSO-P took part in the 1961 and 1962 Soviet Project K nuclear tests above the Sary Shagan range to examine the effects of high altitude nuclear explosions on missile defence hardware.

== Dnestr ==
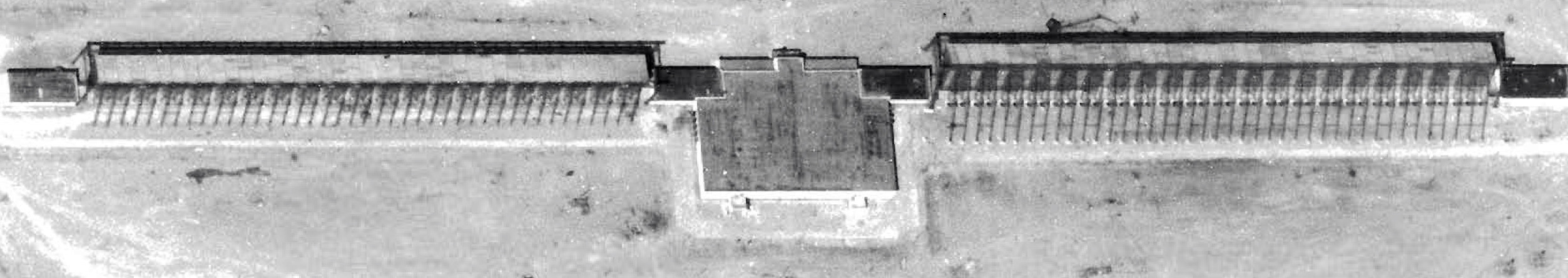
KH-7 Gambit US spy satellite image of a Dnestr space surveillance radar at Balkhash Radar Station, 28 May 1967. Note the radar arrays are in straight line.

Dnestr is a Phased array, Azimuth scanning by frequency modulation with no elevation scanning.

TsSO-P was effective at satellite tracking and was chosen as the radar of the Istrebitel Sputnikov (IS) anti-satellite programme. This programme involved the construction of two sites separated in latitude to form a radar field 5,000 kilometres (3,100 mi) long and 3,000 kilometres (1,900 mi) high. The two sites chosen were at the village of Mishelevka near Irkutsk in Siberia, which was called OS-1, and at Cape Gulshad on Lake Balkhash near Sary Shagan, which was called OS-2. Each site received four Dnestr radar systems in a fan arrangement.

A Dnestr radar was composed of two TsSO-P radar wings joined together by a two-story building containing a joint computer system and command post. Each radar wing covered a 30-degree sector with a 0.5 degree scanning beam. The elevation scanning pattern was a 'spade' with a width of 20 degrees. The radar systems were arranged to create a fan shaped barrier. Of the four radars, called cells (Russian: РЛЯ, romanized: RLYa roughly radio location cell), two faced to the west and two faced to the east. All scanned between +10 degrees and +90 degrees in elevation.

Construction at the two sites started between 1962 and 1963 with improvements in the TsSO-P test model being fed back into the deployed units. They gained an M-4 2-M computer with semiconductors, although the rest of the radar used Vacuum tubes. The radar systems were completed in late 1966 with the fourth Dnestr at Balkhash being used for testing. In 1968, the Dnepropetrovsk Sputnik target satellite, DS-P1-Yu, was used to test the ability of the system.

The Dnestr radars were accepted for service by the Soviet Air Defence Forces in April 1967 and became part of the space surveillance network SKKP.

== Dnestr-M ==
Parallel with the implementation of the Dnestr space surveillance units, a modified version of the original Dnestr units, Dnestr-M radar, was being developed to act as an early warning radar to identify attacks by ballistic missiles. The first two were built at Murmansk in northern Russia (Olenegorsk – RO-1) and near Riga in the then Latvian SSR (Skrunda – RO-2). They constituted the beginning of the Soviet SPRN network, the equivalent of the NATO BMEWS.

The first Dnestr-M at Olenegorsk was completed by 1968. In 1970, the radars at Olenegorsk and Skrunda, and an associated command centre at Solnechnogorsk, were accepted for service. According to Podvig (2002), it seems they were positioned to identify missile launches from NATO submarines in the Norwegian and North Seas.

The Dnestr-M included many improvements over the previous versions such as an increase in the pulse length from 200μs to 800μs which increased the range of objects identified, more semiconductors, and many other scanning and processing changes.

A version of this radar was built at the Sary Shagan test site and was called TsSO-PM (Russian: ЦСО-ПМ). After this had completed tests in 1965 it was decided to upgrade nodes 1 and 2 of the two OS sites to Dnestr-M, keeping nodes 3 and 4 as Dnestr. These radars remained as space surveillance radars which scanned between +10 and +90 degrees, comparative to scanning between +10 and +30 degrees for the missile warning radars. A space surveillance network of four Dnestrs and four Dnestr-Ms, and two command posts was formally commissioned in 1971.

Map of Dnepr radar site at Mukachevo. The two arrays are at 196 and 260 degrees (south and west)

== Dnepr ==
Work to improve the radar continued. An improved array was designed which covered 60 degrees rather than 30. The first Dnepr radar was built at Balkhash as a new radar, cell 5. It entered service on 12 May 1974. The second was a new early warning station at Sevastopol. New Dneprs were also built at Mishelevka and another at Skrunda, and then one at Mukachevo. The remaining radars were all converted to Dnepr with the exception of cells 3 and 4 at Balkhash and Mishelevka which remained space surveillance radars.

All current operational radars are described as Dnepr, and have been updated incrementally.

== Technical details ==
Each Dnepr array is a double sectoral horn antenna 250m long by 12 m wide. It has two rows of slot radiators within two waveguides. At each end of the two arrays, there is a set of transmitting and receiving equipment. It emits a signal covering a sector 30 degrees in azimuth and 30 degrees in elevation, with the scanning controlled by frequency. Four sets mean the radar covers 120 degrees in azimuth and 30 degrees in elevation (5 to 35 degrees).

The Dnepr involved the horn antenna being reduced from 20 to 14 metres in height and the addition of a polarising filter.

== Current status ==
These radars have been installed at six different radar stations and as of 2012 are operational at three – Balkhash, Mishelevka and Olenegorsk. The 1972 Anti-Ballistic Missile Treaty required that early warning radars were located on the periphery of national territory and faced outwards. This caused problems when the Soviet Union collapsed in 1991 as many of the radar stations were now in newly independent states. The first station to close was Skrunda, in newly independent Latvia. A 1994 agreement between Russia and Latvia agreed that the two Dnepr radars there would stop working in 1998, and would be fully demolished by 2000.

Russia signed an agreement with Ukraine in 1992 allowing it to continue using the Dnepr radars at Sevastopol and Mukachevo. The stations were run by Ukrainian personnel and data was sent to the headquarters of the Russian early warning system in Solnechnogorsk. In 2008 Russia announced that it was pulling out of the agreement with Ukraine and that the last data given to Russia from the stations would be in 2009. The Ukrainian government announced that the stations were to be used part-time for space surveillance.

The remaining stations in Russia and abroad are being replaced by the Voronezh radar. The Dneprs in Mishelevka, Irkutsk will close once the second array of the new Voronezh radar is operational. The Dnepr at Olenegorsk, Murmansk will be replaced by a Voronezh as well. It is planned to start construction there in 2017.

Designation	Location	Coordinates	Azimuth	Type	Built	Details
OS-1	Mishelevka Radar Station, Irkutsk, Siberia, Russia	52.877574°N 103.273323°E	70, 200	Dnepr	1972–1976	Operational.
OS-1	Mishelevka Radar Station, Irkutsk, Siberia, Russia	52.881511°N 103.266027°E	135	Dnestr-M	1964–1970	Dismantled 1970s. Replaced by Dnepr radar at the new position.
OS-1	Mishelevka Radar Station, Irkutsk, Siberia, Russia	52.883013°N 103.258045°E	265	Dnestr	1964–1968	Modernised to an incoherent scatter radar. Used for research since 1993.
OS-1	Mishelevka Radar Station, Irkutsk, Siberia, Russia	52.875787°N 103.256414°E	265	Dnestr	1964–1968	Decommissioned 1990s. Dismantled.
OS-1	Mishelevka Radar Station, Irkutsk, Siberia, Russia	52.874829°N 103.260791°E	135	Dnestr-M	1967–1972	Modernised to Dnepr 1976. Operational.
OS-2	Balkhash Radar Station, Sary Shagan, Kazakhstan	46.60741°N 74.523304°E	270	Dnestr	1964–1967	Decommissioned September 1995. Dismantled.
OS-2	Balkhash Radar Station, Sary Shagan, Kazakhstan	46.614574°N 74.523132°E	270	Dnestr	1964–1967	Decommissioned January 1984. Dismantled.
OS-2	Balkhash Radar Station, Sary Shagan, Kazakhstan	46.625333°N 74.51721°E	60	Dnestr-M	1964–1971	Modernised to Dnepr 1974. Decommissioned January 1984. Dismantled.
OS-2	Balkhash Radar Station, Sary Shagan, Kazakhstan	46.631463°N 74.512618°E	60	Dnestr-M	1964–1971	Modernised to Dnepr 1974. Decommissioned September 1988. Dismantled.
OS-2	Balkhash Radar Station, Sary Shagan, Kazakhstan	46.603076°N 74.530985°E	180, 124	Dnepr	1968–1972	Decommissioned 2020.
RO-1	Olenegorsk-1, Kola Peninsula, Russia	68.1141°N 33.9102°E	323, 293	Dnestr-M	1965–1968	Modernised to Dnepr 1978, works with the Daugava radar. Operational.
RO-2	Skrunda-1, Latvia	56.715176°N 21.963036°E	323, 293	Dnestr-M	1965–1969	Modernised to Dnepr 1979. Demolished 1999.
RO-2	Skrunda-1, Latvia	56.7082°N 21.9410°E	8, 248	Dnepr	1968–1976	Demolished 1999.
RO-4	Sevastopol Radar Station, Crimea, Ukraine/Russia	44.5788°N 33.3862°E	172, 230	Dnepr	1968–1979	Closed 2009. To be replaced by Voronezh radar.
RO-5	Mukachevo Radar Station, Zakarpattia Oblast, Ukraine	48.377689°N 22.707446°E	196, 260	Dnepr	1968–1979	Closed 2009. Derelict?
