= Mezaine =

Latvian Army training ground and former Soviet early warning radar station

Mežaine
- Militārais poligons Mežaine
- Raņķi, Latvia

Site information
- Type: military training area

Location
- Location within Latvia
- Coordinates: 56.716667°N 21.983333°E

Site history
- Built: 2022
- Built by: Latvia

Garrison information
- Garrison: 4th Brigade of Latvian National Guard

Mežaine, officially Military training area Mežaine (Latvian: Militārais poligons Mežaine), is a Latvian National Armed Forces military training area of the 4th Brigade of the Latvian National Guard in Raņķi Parish, Kuldīga Municipality near the town of Skrunda. The military training area consists of a former ghost town, variously known as Skrunda-1, Skrunda-2, Lokators or Līdumnieki, and the surrounding area. The ghost town was built in the 1960s to house Soviet military personnel serving at two Soviet Dnepr radar (NATO designation "Hen House") installations at the site. Following the Soviet collapse in 1991, the Russian military continued to operate the site until it withdrew completely from Latvia in 1998; the radar stations were torn down, the buildings were abandoned, and the site is now reserved by the Latvian government for use in urban warfare training.

== Soviet military installation ==
In the 1960s, two Soviet Dnepr radar (NATO designation "Hen House") installations were constructed at the site near the town of Skrunda. A Daryal radar was being built there before the collapse of the Soviet Union. The installation was strategically important to the Soviet Union as its radars covered Western Europe. The two barn-like radars were one of the most important Soviet early warning radar stations for listening to objects in space and for tracking possible incoming ICBMs.

Pursuant to an agreement (On the Legal Status of the Skrunda Radar Station During its temporary Operation and Dismantling), signed by Latvia and Russia on 30 April 1994, Russia had been allowed to run the radar station for four years, after which it was obliged to dismantle the station within eighteen months. The deadline for dismantling was 29 February 2000. Russia asked Latvia to extend the lease on the Dnepr station for at least two years, until the new Volga station under construction near Baranovichi in Belarus became operational. Riga rejected these requests, and the radar was verified closed on 4 September 1998 by an inspection team from the Organization for Security and Co-operation in Europe.

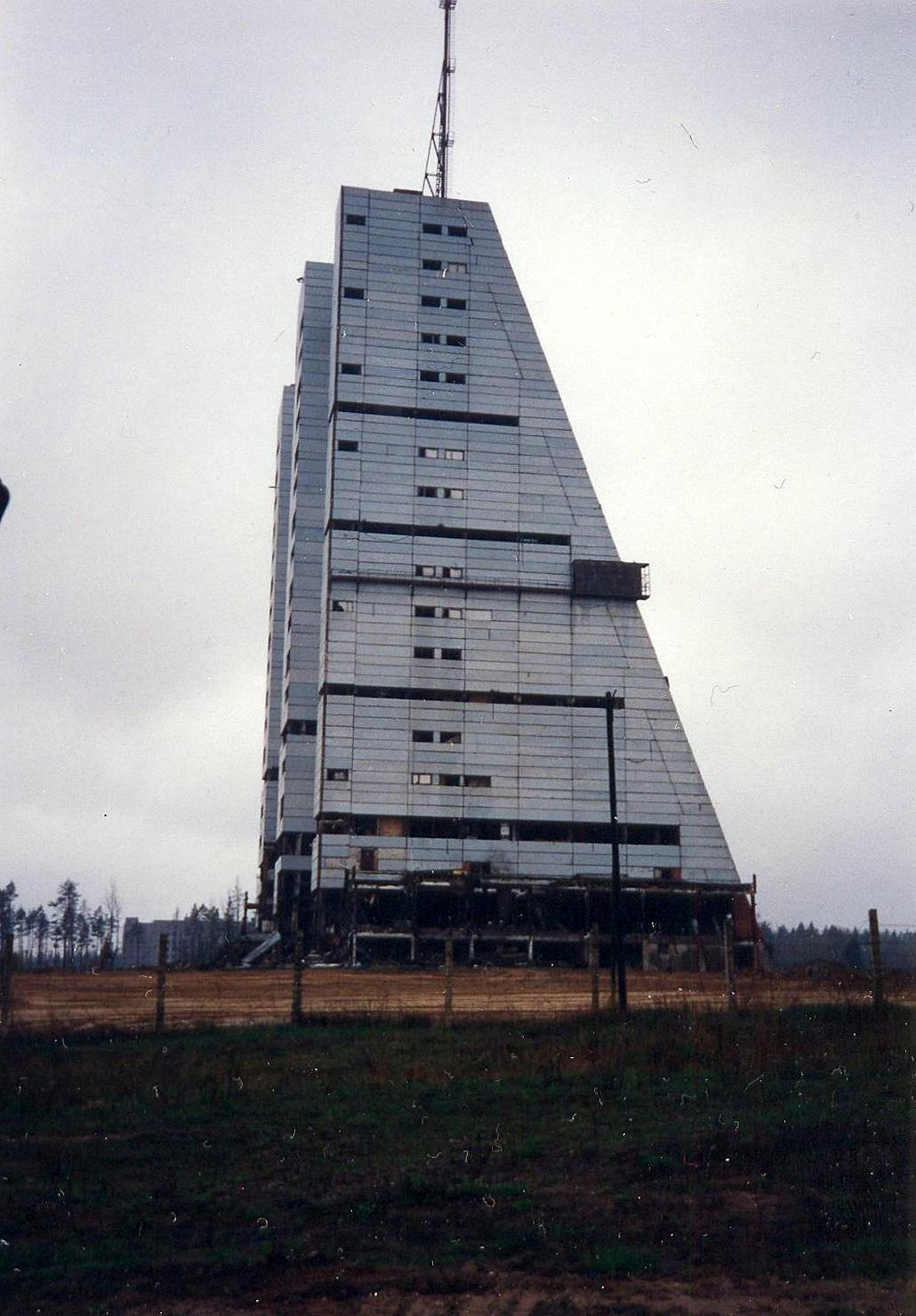
Former Daryal radar receiver

On 4 May 1995 US demolition experts razed a 19-story tower, which housed a former Soviet Daryal radar system, one of the most advanced bistatic early-warning radars in the world. Construction of the tower began in 1984, but was halted by local authorities in August 1991. It served as one of the USSR's most important radar stations as it was responsible for scanning skies to the west for incoming bombers or nuclear missiles before the USSR disintegrated. The event spilled tens of thousands of Latvian people onto country roads and fields to watch the early morning spectacle, which was also televised nationwide. A dedicated soundtrack, Liberatio, was written by Latvian composer Zigmars Liepiņš to accompany the event. Latvian leaders, diplomats and other officials toasted the blast with champagne, with the prime minister of Latvia Valdis Birkavs proclaiming that with this event "World War II in Latvia has [finally] ended". The demolition was sponsored by the US, who paid 7 million US dollars for the destruction performed by Controlled Demolition, Inc. The rubble was cleared by November 1995.

In a joint New Year 1998 statement, the presidents of Estonia, Latvia, and Lithuania urged Russian president Boris Yeltsin to complete the pullout of all Russian troops from the region, as Russia had promised four years prior in 1994. All materials of value were removed from the site and transported back to Russia when the last Russian troops left that year; the 60 buildings that comprised the former complex and town, including apartment blocks, a school, barracks and an officers club, were abandoned but left standing. The buildings, in increasing disrepair, were still standing in 2010.

== Ghost town ==
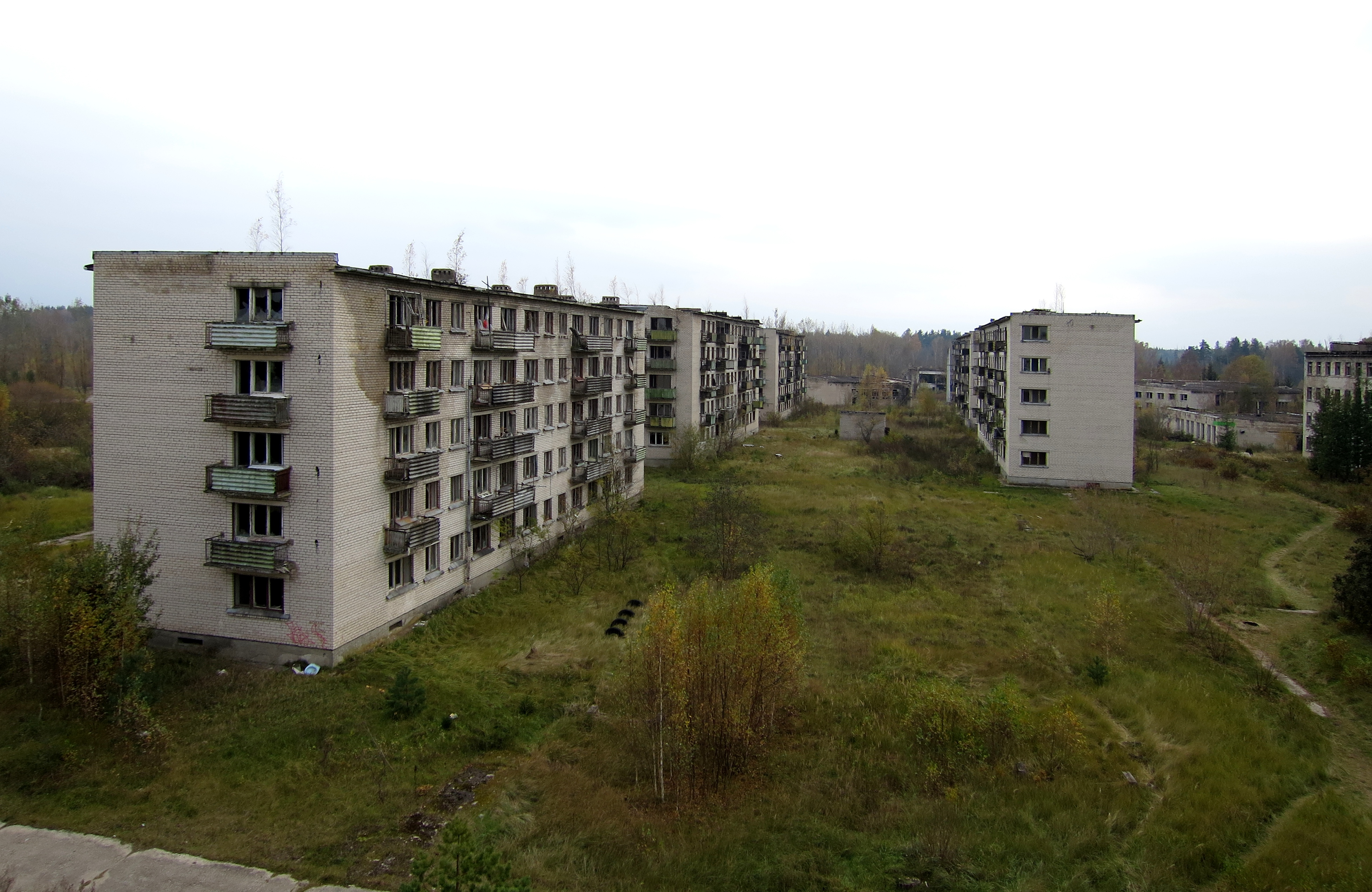
The ghost town in 2016

The Latvian government decided to sell the site in 2008, and on 5 February 2010, the entire 40-hectare (99-acre) former town was sold as a single lot at auction in Riga. The starting bid was 150,000 lats (290,000 USD; 211,000 EUR). The winning bid was by Russian firm Alekseevskoye-Serviss for 1.55 million lats (3.1 million USD; 2.2 million EUR). The auction, which lasted two hours, was also contested by another Russian firm, as well as a bidder from Azerbaijan.

The winning bidder pulled out of the auction, as did the runner up. The town was reauctioned in June 2010 for only 170,000 Lats.

In 2015 the site was bought by Skrunda Municipality for €12,000 ($13544.02). Around half the area was transferred to the Latvian National Armed Forces as a training ground. The remainder is to be leased by the local government with the stipulation that potential investors develop the area economically. Demolition of selected derelict buildings has since commenced.

From February 2016 in response to increased interest at the site, the municipality began charging an entrance fee of 4 euros for individuals. As of 21 October 2018 the ghost town was closed for visitors and is solely used by the armed forces of Latvia and its NATO allies.

0n 20 August 2026, BBC News reported that 256 Marines of the British armed forces had reached an out of court financial settlement with the UK government over their alleged exposure to asbestos whilst on training exercises at Skrunda-1 in 2018 and 2019.
