= Notre-Dame de l'Ortiguière =

French chapel

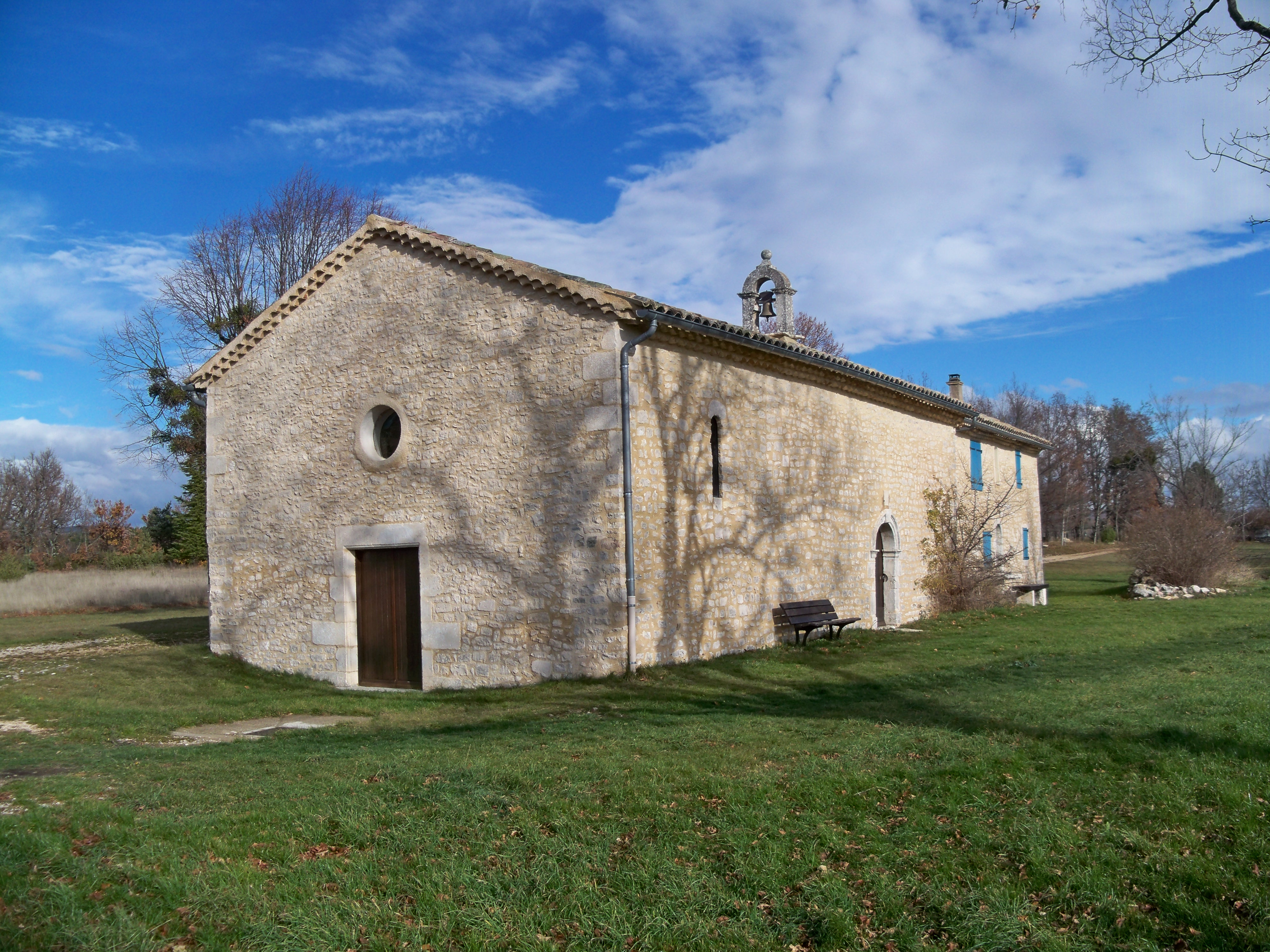
- The sanctuary
- Location: Revest-du-Bion; Alpes-de-Haute-Provence; France
- Coordinates: 44°04′17″N 5°32′05″E
- Type: Diocese of Digne
- Beginning date: 13th century, 1665 and early 19th century
- Dedicated date: Catholic Church
- Dedicated to: Initial destination: Rural Chapel then Respite Sanctuary; Current destination: Pilgrimage Worship in May
- Parish: Parish sector of Montagne de Lure

Notre-Dame de l'Ortiguière is a rural chapel located in the commune of Revest-du-Bion, in the Alpes-de-Haute-Provence department. Built in the 13th century, it was destroyed on two occasions. Of the original Romanesque structure, only four consoles in the shape of Atlante heads remain, which archaeologists have associated with Scandinavian influences. From the 17th century onward, the chapel functioned as a sanctuary of respite.

== Location ==
The chapel is located on the Albion Plateau, between Mont Ventoux and Lure Mountain. It is accessible via the D218 road, which connects the villages of Saint-Christol and Revest-du-Bion.

== History ==
The name Revest-du-Bion first appeared in 1274 in an ecclesiastical register mentioning a prior assigned to Revesto Albionis. A century later, the parish, whose church was dedicated to Saint Clair, was under the authority of Cluny through Ganagobie. In addition to the parish church, the only chapel recorded was Notre-Dame de l'Ortiguière, referred to in the same register as ecclesia beatae Mariae de Silva in Albione (“Our Lady of the Forest of Albion”). At that time, the plateau was largely wooded and was gradually cleared by Benedictine monks from Villeneuve-lès-Avignon to encourage pastoral activity.

Notre-Dame of the Forest of Albion was destroyed in 1392 by the armed bands of Raymond de Turenne, leaving no trace of the original chapel. It was rebuilt in 1665, reportedly after the discovery in the ruins of a statue of a Black Madonna, from which the name Ortiguière is said to derive. During the French Revolution, the Commission populaire of Orange ordered its demolition, which was only partially carried out, allowing for its restoration after the Concordat. The statue of the Black Madonna disappeared in the 19th century, most likely due to theft.

In the 20th century, the French Air Force established nuclear missile installations on the plateau, which were later dismantled, although the fenced launch sites remain visible. The French Aerospace Research and Study Office has installed the GRAVES radar receiver on one of these former sites, facing the chapel. The hermitage of the sanctuary, owned by the commune of Revest, has been converted into accommodation for hikers and has been managed by the association Alpes de Lumière since 2005.

== Architecture ==
The sanctuary, rebuilt in 1665 with a hermitage adjoining its flat chevet and reconstructed again in the early 19th century, preserves from the original Romanesque chapel only the choir sculptures: four consoles in the shape of Atlante heads, dated by archaeologists to the 13th century. According to specialists, “these four heads are of remarkable technical diversity and symbolic richness,” with themes linked to Scandinavian mythology, described as “a unique and inexplicable case in the Mediterranean region.”

Carved capitals in the shape of human heads related to Scandinavian mythology

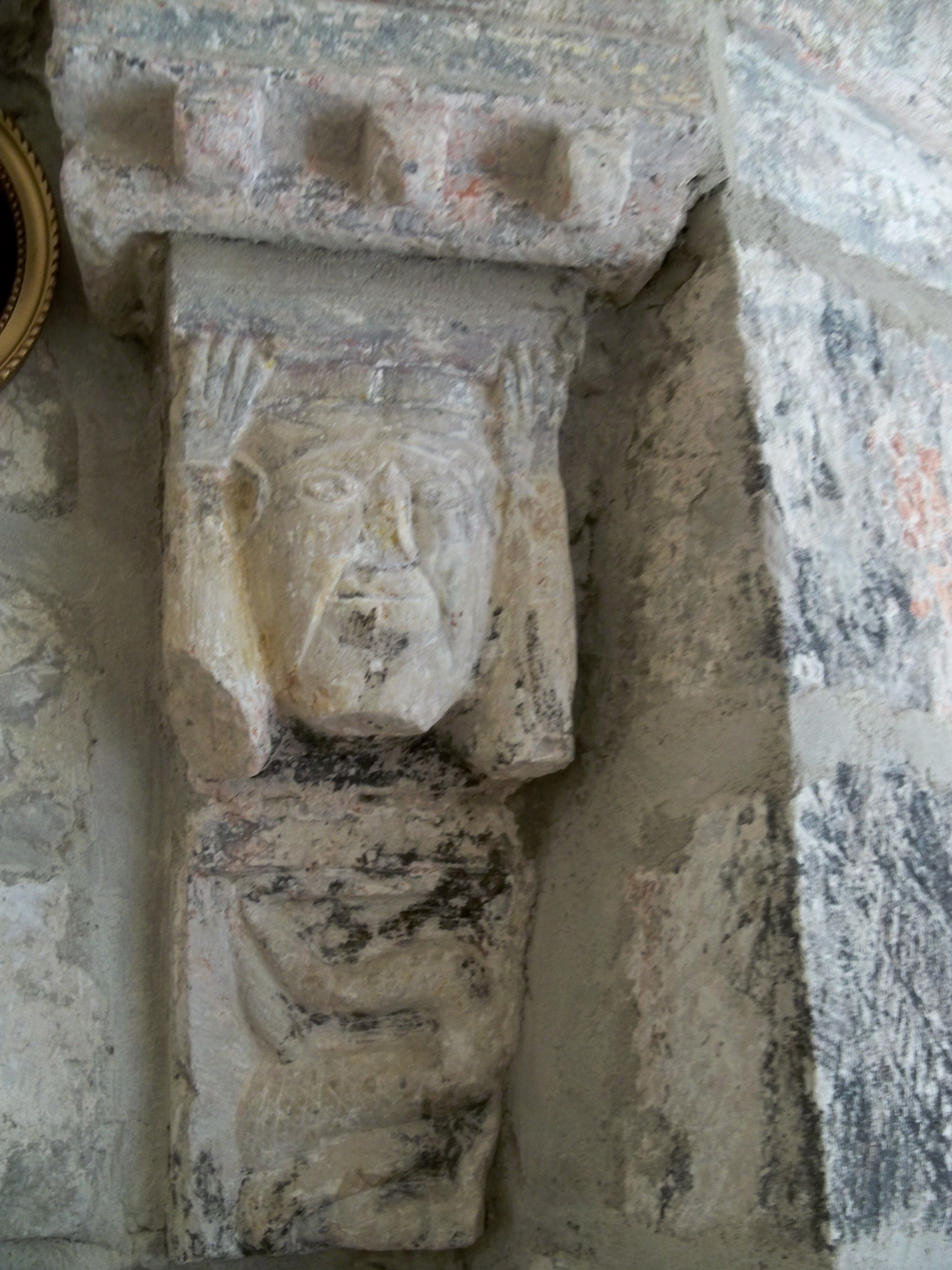
A peasant, wearing a bliaud, thrusting a spear into the mouth of an enormous dragon

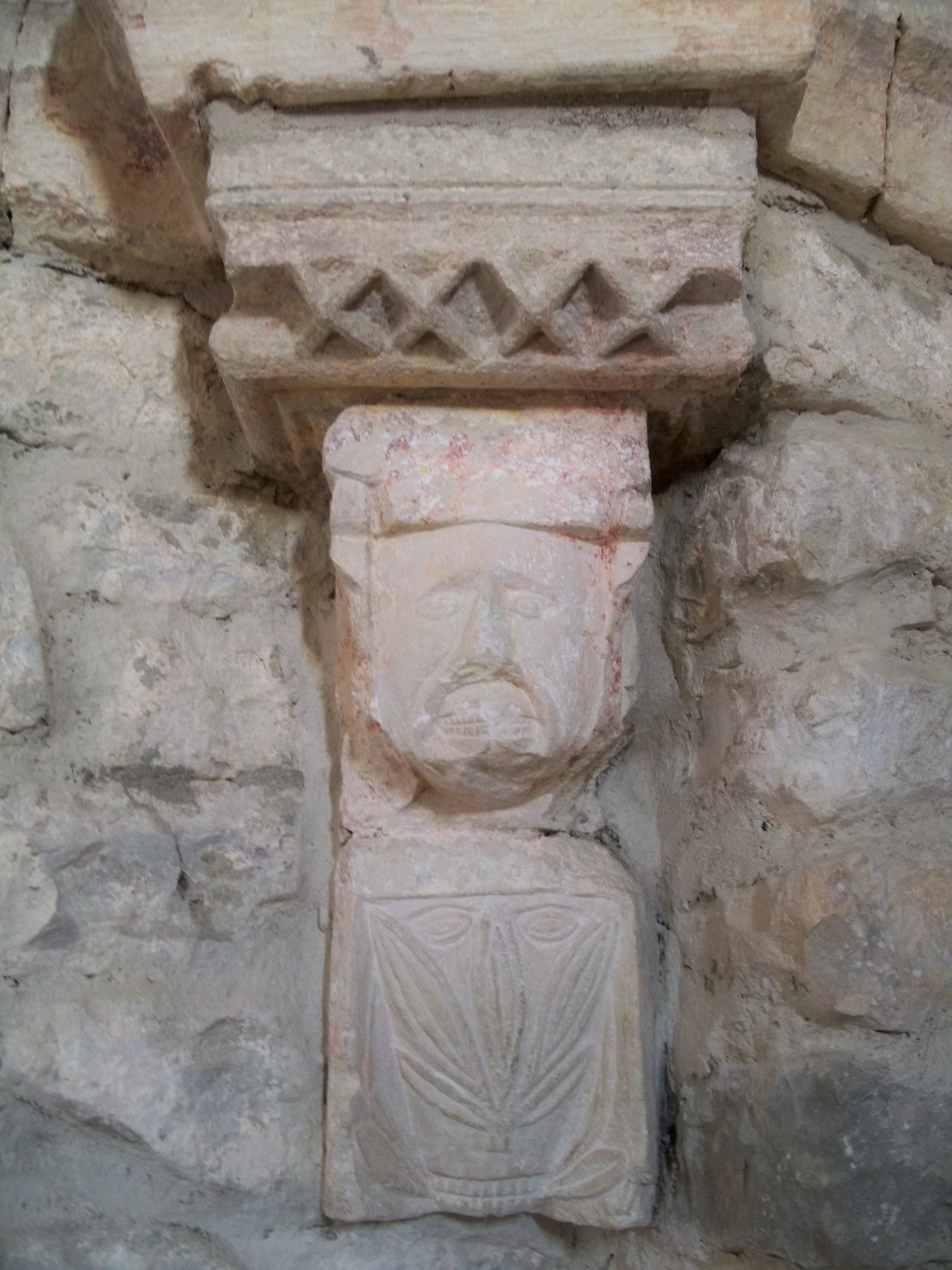
Tense human face resulting from a plant metamorphosis

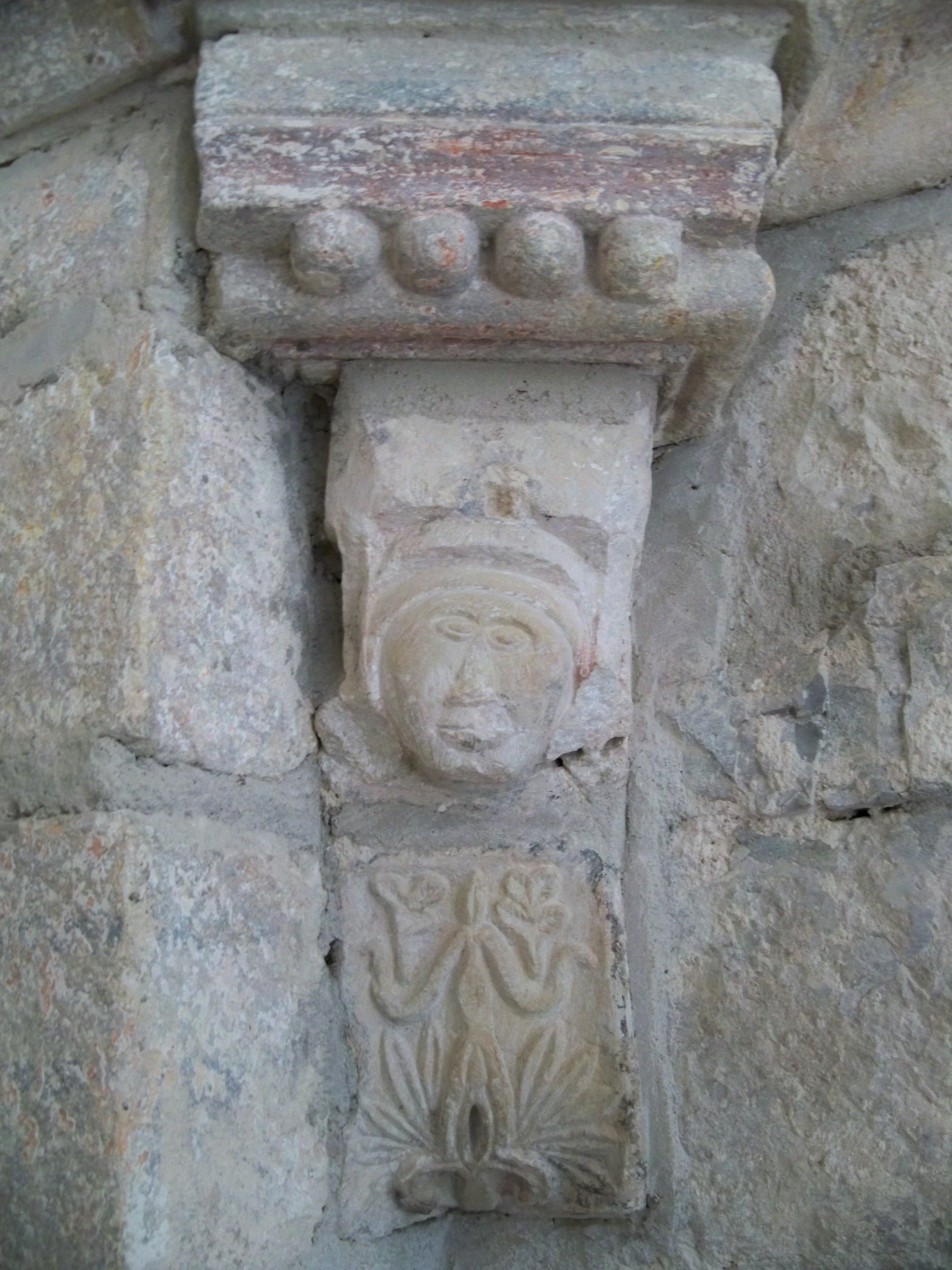
Female figure emerging from the tree of life

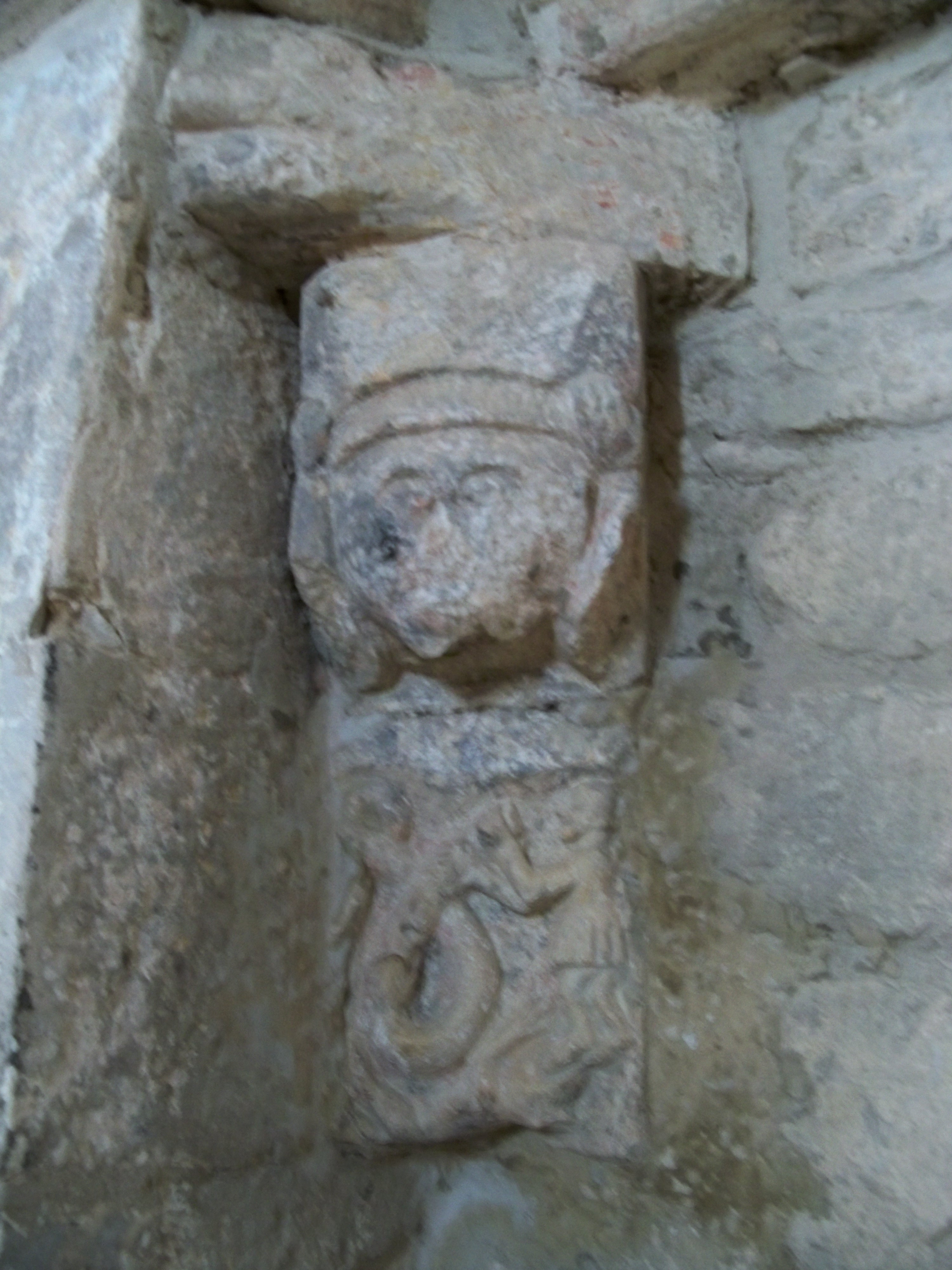
Serpent, symbol of Evil, coiled on itself

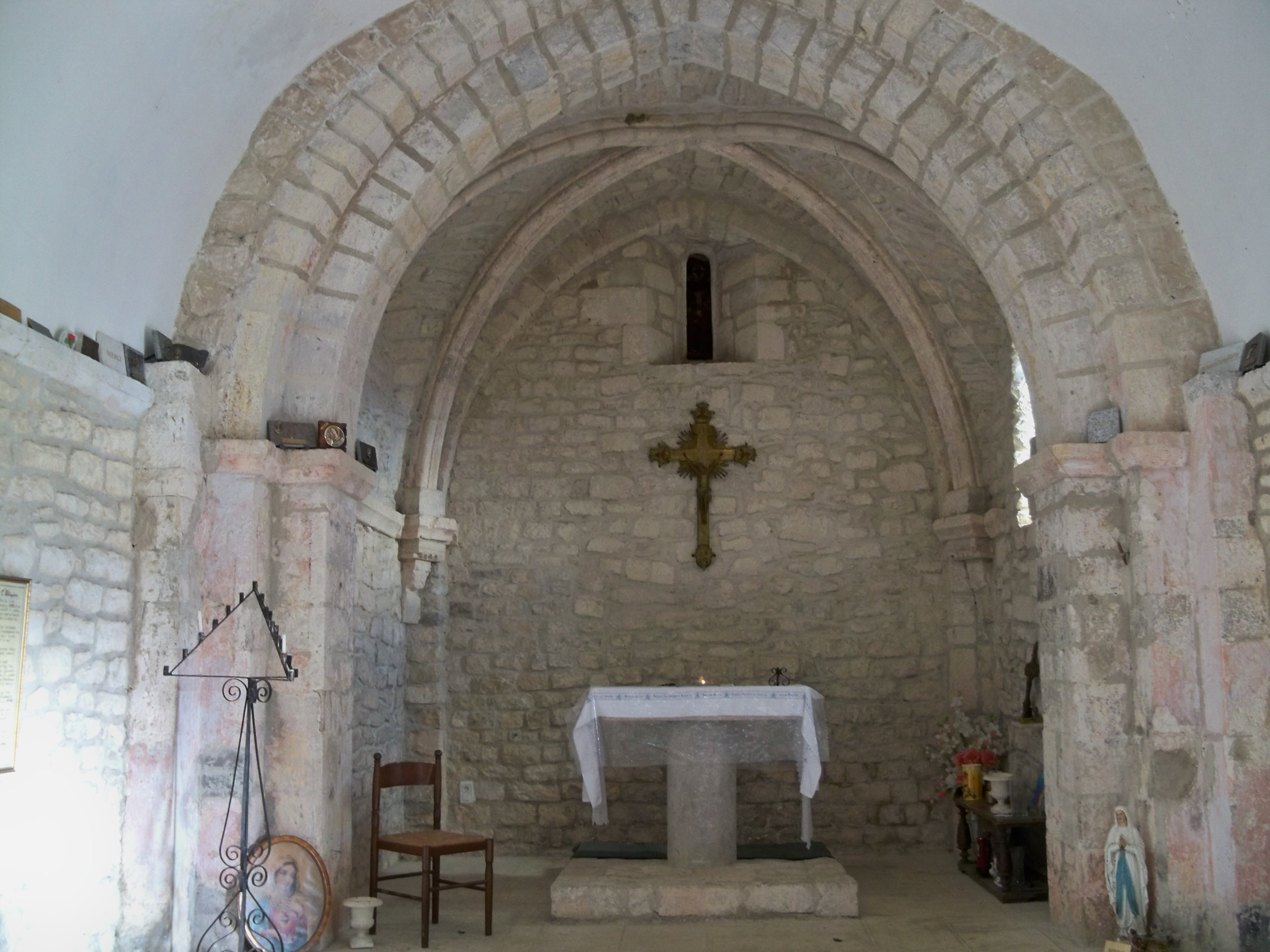
The choir, the vault and its ribs

The ribs supporting the vault rest on four impost blocks decorated with simple reliefs of spheres, cubes, or stars. These are supported by consoles depicting “two square, rugged, weathered male faces, and two rounded, delicate female faces, awkwardly bearing with their arms the weight of a vault that crushes them.”

Beneath the heads, four bas-reliefs are carved. The first depicts a peasant in a tunic driving a stake into the mouth of a dragon while a wolf bites his legs. The second shows a man’s face undergoing a vegetal metamorphosis. The remaining two are associated with femininity: one presents “a fleeting feminine figure, with broad, graceful gestures, emerging from a plant that could be the tree of life,” while the other, beneath a medieval female figure supporting the only undecorated impost block, features a serpent coiled upon itself. This series has been interpreted as symbolizing the passage from earth to heaven through the struggles and transformations of man and woman.

== Sanctuary of respite ==
The reconstruction of the chapel in the mid-17th century, associated with the discovery of a statue of a Black Madonna and the reuse of the four consoles, led to its being placed under the care of a hermit. He reported miracles and documented them in official statements, contributing to the chapel becoming a frequented pilgrimage site. According to tradition, stillborn children brought to the chapel were sometimes revived long enough to be baptized after showing signs of life. This phenomenon of temporary revival or respite was observed in several sanctuaries during the 16th and 17th centuries. The closest comparable sites to Revest are the chapel of Notre-Dame in Beauvoir at Moustiers-Sainte-Marie and the church of Saint-Pantaléon at the foot of the Vaucluse mountains. Pilgrimages to Notre-Dame de l'Ortiguière continue today, particularly for the May feast of the fruits of the earth.

== Bibliography ==
- Collectif (1976). Notre-Dame de l'Ortiguière, une église, un ermitage, un site ouvert au cœur du plateau d'Albion [Notre-Dame de l'Ortiguière, a church, a hermitage, an open site in the heart of the Albion plateau] (in French). Alpes de Lumière.
