= Space domain awareness =

Surveillance from and of the outer space environment

Space domain awareness is the study and monitoring of satellites orbiting the Earth. It involves the detection, tracking, cataloging and identification of artificial objects, i.e. active/inactive satellites, spent rocket bodies, or fragmentation debris.

== Aims ==
Space domain awareness accomplishes the following:

- Predicting when and where a decaying space object will re-enter the Earth's atmosphere;
- Preventing a returning space object, which to radar looks like a missile, from triggering a false alarm in missile-attack warning sensors;
- Charting the present position of space objects and plot their anticipated orbital paths;
- Detecting new human-made objects in space;
- Producing a running catalogue of human-made space objects;
- Determining which country owns a re-entering space object;
- Informing countries whether or not objects may interfere with satellites and International Space Station orbits;
- Providing data for future anti-satellite weapons systems.

== Systems ==
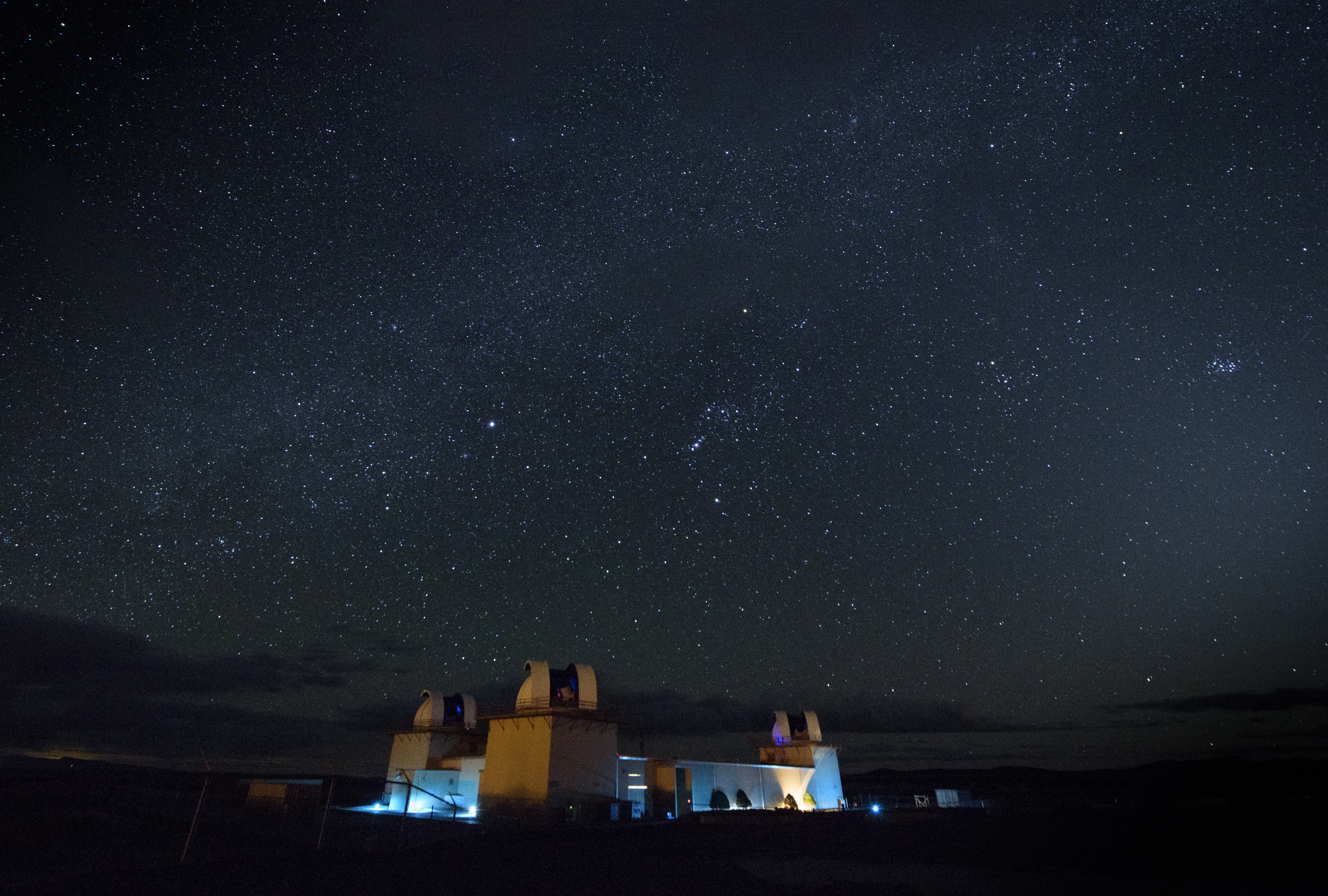
Ground-based electro-optical deep-space surveillance telescopes at White Sands Missile Range.

Systems include:

- The DEEP-Sight prototype, designed by Deepinder Uppal on behalf of the Defense Innovation Unit, this system is designed to provide space domain awareness across a broad-spectrum of SDA use cases to Space Force, the United States Navy and PSRA (Public Satellite Research and Analysis) teams.
- The United States Space Surveillance Network which has detectors such as the Space Fence (replacing the now defunct Air Force Space Surveillance System) and Space Surveillance Telescope
- The Russian Centre for Outer Space Monitoring with facilities such as Okno and Krona and Sazhen-S, used to analyse the orbital parameters of space craft.
- The French GRAVES (Grand Réseau Adapté à la Veille Spatiale) bi-static radar-based space surveillance system deploy by French Air Force
- The European Space Situational Awareness Programme with multiple assets in its Space Surveillance and Tracking Segment
- The Australian based Silentium Defence Oculus passive radar space observatory in Swan Reach, South Australia
- The American National Reconnaissance Office's Silentbarker satellites

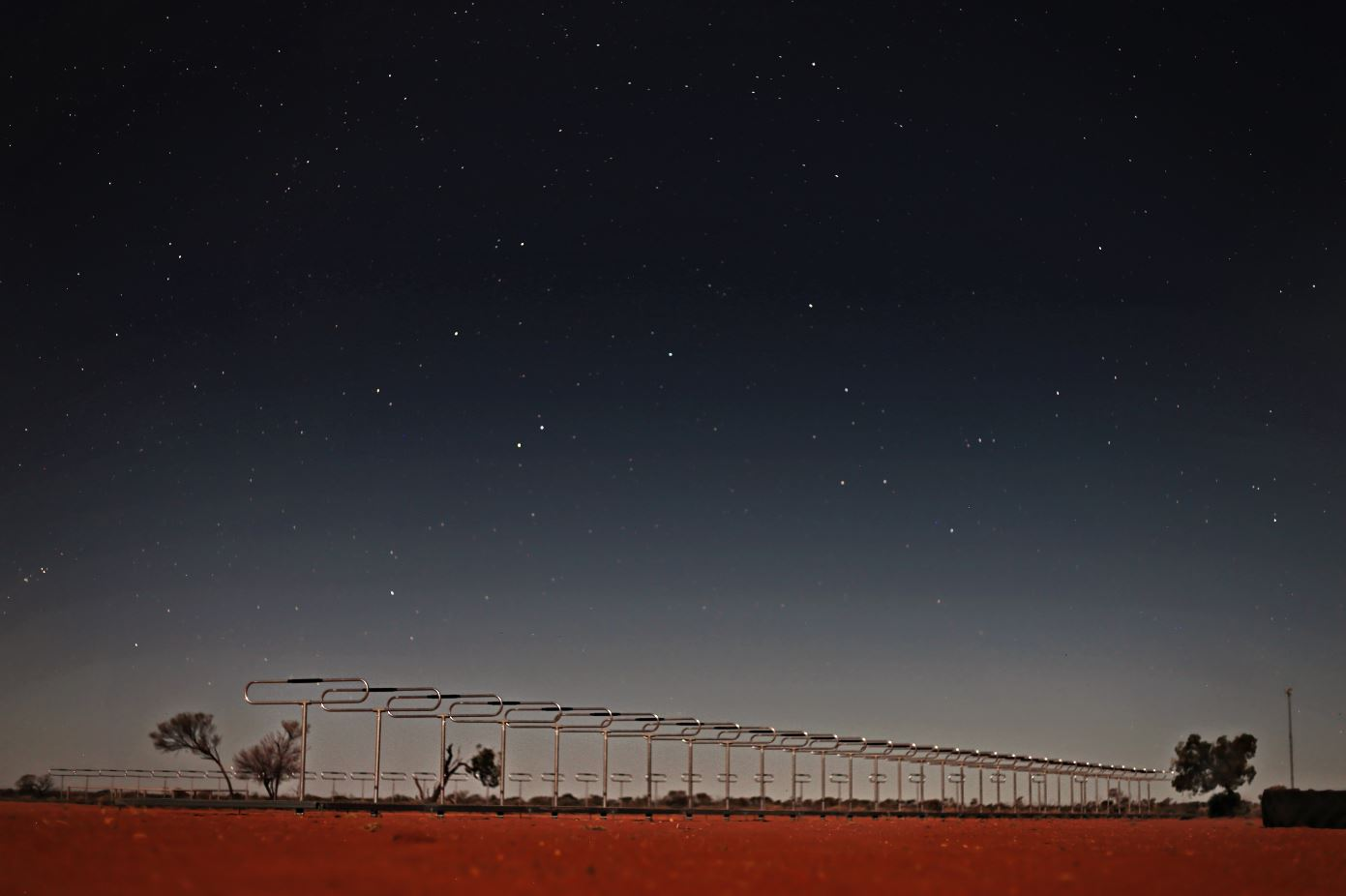
Silentium Defence Oculus Observatory
