= Krona-N =

Krona-N
- Крона-н
- Russia

Site information
- Type: Space surveillance station
- Owner: Russian Aerospace Forces
- Controlled by: Russian Space Forces

Location
- Krona-N in Nakhodka
- Coordinates: 42.9357°N 132.576769°E

Site history
- Built: 2008?

Garrison information
- Garrison: Military unit в/ч 29982 (Note: в/ч nnnnn is the standard way of writing Russian military units, standing for войсковая часть (military unit))

Krona-N (Russian: Радиолокационный комплекс "Крона-Н", romanized: Radiolokatsionny kompleks Krona-N) is a Russian military complex which uses radar to analyse satellites and other spacecraft. It is located in Nakhodka in the Russian Far East and is part of the Centre for Outer Space Monitoring, the space surveillance section of the Russian Space Forces. Krona-N is the second Krona, the first Krona is in Zelenchukskaya in the North Caucasus.

== History ==
Krona-N was mentioned in a 1980 report by Soviet military contractor Vympel on the future development of the Soviet system of space monitoring and control. This report stated that the Krona in Zelenchukskaya should be completed and proposed the development of Krona-N in the far east, and a complex called Krona-V (Russian: Крона-В). Krona-V was to detect space craft in high Earth orbits, and Krona-N to detect craft in low Earth orbits.

Work on Krona-N stopped in the mid 1980s but restarted sometime later. In 2005 it was described as being under construction and in late 2007 the then Space Forces commander Vladimir Popovkin was quoted as saying it would be commissioned in 2008.

== Facility ==
Krona complexes have been described as counter-intelligence facilities which identify and study hostile military satellites. The first Krona in Zelechukskaya is on two sites with an optical telescope and a LIDAR as well as two radars. Krona-N has no optical component, it is on one site and entirely radar based.

In common with Krona in Zelechukskaya there are two radars on this site. The largest one, the tree-like antenna giving the facility its name, (Note: from the crown of a tree, krona dereva) is a decimeter band (UHF) (Note: Russian sources describe this as being in UHF channel A) phased array radar designed by NIIDAR. The other radar, operating in the centimeter band (SHF), (Note: Russian sources describe this as being in SHF channel N) consists of 5 rotating parabolic dishes in a cross which work on the basis of interferometry.

Krona-N has GRAU index 40Zh6 (Russian: 40Ж6) and the military unit is number 29982. The town is called Fokino-1 (Russian: Фокино-1) after the nearest settlement, the closed naval town of Fokino.
