= Sazhen-S =

Soviet laser/optical space surveillance system

- КОС "Сажень-С"
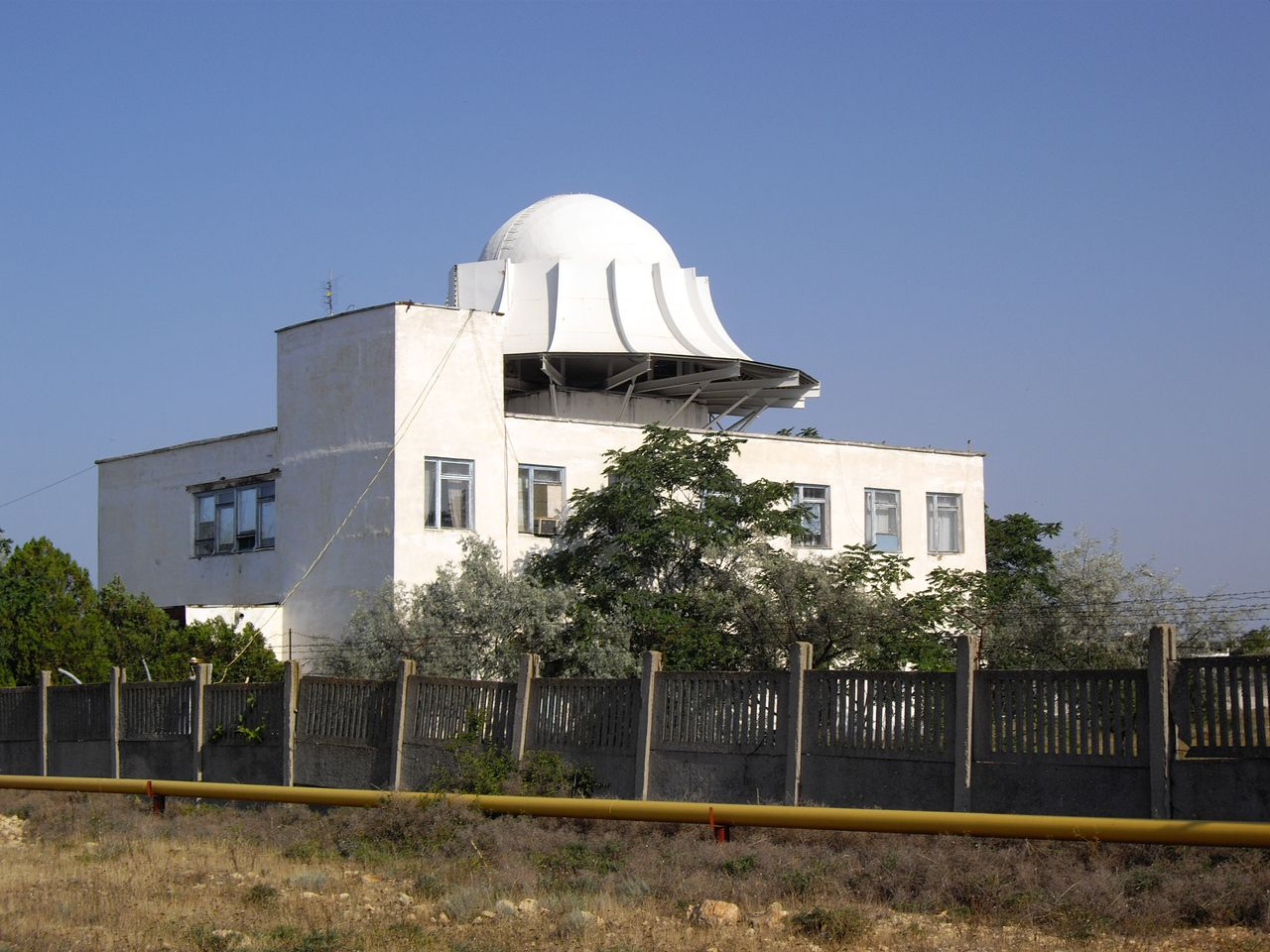
- AZT-28 telescope at Vityne, near Yevpatoria

Site history
- Built: 1984
- Built by: Soviet Union

Sazhen-S (Russian: Сажень-С) is a Soviet laser/optical space surveillance system, used to analyse the orbital parameters of spacecraft. There are several installations across the former Soviet Union, one of which is based at space ground station NIP-19 (Note: The official English name is the Centre of the special information receiving and processing and the navigating field control. NIP-19 is its former Soviet name.) near Dunaivtsi in Ukraine. It is named after the sazhen, a former Russian unit of measurement that translates as fathom and has a length of 2.1 metres (6.9 ft). A similar system is Sazhen-T.

== History ==
A number of Sazhen-S installations were constructed at the network of scientific monitoring stations. At least two are now in Ukraine – one in Dunaivtsi and another at Vityne, near Yevpatoria. At least one is in Russia, and in 2004 it was reported that the Russian military was debugging interactions between the Russia installation(s) and the Russian Main Space Intelligence Centre.

Construction of the Sazhen-S facility in Dunaivtsi started in 1979 and it was commissioned in February 1984. Upgrade work started in 2001 and has continued incrementally.

== Facility ==
Sazhen-S has five parts. The main part is an AZT-28 (АЗТ-28) telescope with a cassegrain reflector of diameter, 500 millimetres (20 in). Connected to this there is a laser ranging system, hinged light receivers, laser calibration equipment and a system to measure angular co-ordinates by using star catalogues.

Sazhen-S can measure the slant range to spacecraft fitted with corner reflectors that are in orbits with altitudes between 1,000 kilometres (620 mi) and 40,000 kilometres (25,000 mi) (between low Earth orbit and above geosynchronous orbit). It also measures the angular co-ordinates of spacecraft at altitudes between 19,000 kilometres (12,000 mi) and 40,000 kilometres (25,000 mi) using reflected light, providing the spacecraft is at or above a magnitude of 13. In addition it can measure the brightness of spacecraft if they are at a magnitude of 12 and above.
