= Lake Kickapoo =

- Location within Texas Location within the United States
- Location: Archer County, Texas
- Coordinates: 33°39′40″N 098°46′34″W
- Lake type: reservoir
- Basin countries: United States
- Surface area: 6,200 acres (2,500 ha)

Lake Kickapoo is a reservoir located on the North Fork Little Wichita River in the Red River Basin of Archer County, Texas. It is neighbored by Archer City, Texas (population of 1,834) and Wichita Falls, Texas (population of 104,553) which reside within the Central Great Plains ecoregion.

== Hydrology ==
Lake Kickapoo reservoir was created by the impoundment of North Fork Little Wichita River, its only in-flow tributary, in 1946. The out-flow tributaries are Kickapoo Creek, Brier Creek, and Slippery Creek. It has a mean water level of 1,038 feet (316 m), surface area of 4,312 acres (1,745 ha), and elevation of 1,060 feet (320 m) above sea level as of 2022. The storage capacity, as of October 29, 2022, is 51,596 acre-feet (63,643,000 m^{3}) with a maximum capacity of 86,345 acre-feet (106,505,000 m^{3}). The reservoir storage has steadily dropped by 293 acre-feet/year since 1945 when it had a total capacity of 106,000 acre-feet (131,000,000 m^{3}), due to increasing drought events in the region.

== Ecoregion ==
Lake Kickapoo resides within the Broken Red Plains subdivision of the Central Great Plains ecoregion. The Broken Red Plains ecoregion is defined by red clay and sandy soils, with irregular sandstone and shrub-covered surface of the even more specific Wichita Formation ecoregion. It is predominantly grass-/shrublands with plant species like Texas wintergrass, blue grama, buffalograss, sand bluestem, etc. The riparian vegetation includes species such as cedar elm trees, pecan trees, black willow trees, and tobosa grass. This region has an annual precipitation of 30 inches and mean air temperature of 41 degrees Fahrenheit in January and 84 degrees Fahrenheit in July.

== Uses ==
=== Water supply ===
The construction of Lake Kickapoo Dam began in January 1945 and was completed on December 15, 1945. However, the deliberate impoundment of the North Fork Little Wichita River, a tributary of the Red River, did not occur until February 1, 1946. Lake Kickapoo Dam is classified as earth-fill embankment dam with a length of 8,200 feet (2,500 m) (including spillway) and height of 62 feet (19 m). This dam's maximum design water surface has the capability to reach 1,060 feet (320 m) above sea level but has been experiencing much lower levels due to recent droughts in the area. The dam's uncontrolled spillway is classified as ogee concrete and has a crest elevation of 1,045 feet (319 m) above sea level. Lake Kickapoo reservoir is owned by the city of Wichita Falls and operated for the continued use as a water supply. Although it is owned by the city of Wichita Falls, the dam is regulated by the government entity Texas Commission on Environmental Quality.

=== U.S. Naval Space Surveillance ===
One of the nine Air Force Space Surveillance System (formerly NAVSPASUR) sites is located at Lake Kickapoo (33°32.764′N 98°45.763′W). Lake Kickapoo Field Station is one of three transmitter sites of the southern surveillance network, which is operated by the U.S. Naval Command. The purpose of these stations is to maintain an electromagnetic fence that has the capability to identify objects as far as 15,000 nautical miles (28,000 km; 17,000 mi). The Lake Kickapoo field station was constructed in 1951 to fill a gap in the surveillance fence. It is considered unique due to its transmitting power of 560 kilowatts via the combination of commercial FM and TV power unit frequencies.

== Recreation ==
=== Sports fishing ===
The main source of recreation for Lake Kickapoo is sports fishing. The reservoir contains sports fish species, such as Blue catfish (abundant), Channel catfish, Flathead catfish, White Bass (abundant), Largemouth Bass, and White Crappie (declining in abundance). These fish species are supported by prey fish, such as Gizzard shad (abundant) and Bluegill (decreased abundance).

Management plans have been enacted to support the genetic diversity of Largemouth Bass due to this species designation as a source for Texas Parks and Wildlife Department hatchery brood stock program. This is due to the decline in habitat for spawning and nursery areas via decreased water elevation.

== History ==
=== Namesake ===
The name was derived from the Native American Kickapoo tribe that was native to that area along with the nearby inflow stream, Kickapoo Creek.

=== Land use ===
There is an elevated abundance of honey mesquite in the Broken Red Plains that has been associated with the 19th century cattle drives and subsequent grazing pressure via land use.

=== Dam ===
Lake Kickapoo Dam was designed by F. M. Rugeley and A. J. Gates.
