= Air Force Space Surveillance System =

U.S. government radar system to detect orbital objects

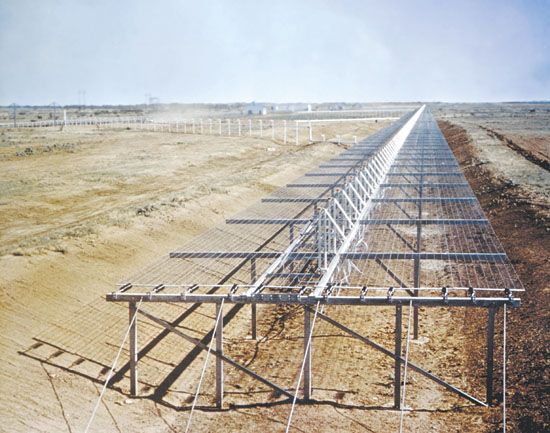
Part of the master transmitter antenna at Lake Kickapoo, Texas c.2001

The AN/FPS-133 Air Force Space Surveillance System, colloquially known as the Space Fence, was a U.S. government multistatic radar system built to detect orbital objects passing over the United States. It was a component of the U.S. Space Surveillance Network, and according to the U.S. Navy was able to detect basketball sized (75 cm (30 in)) objects at heights up to 30,000 km (19,000 mi).

The system ceased operation in September 2013. Plans for a new Space Fence began with sites at the Kwajalein Atoll in the Marshall Islands, along with an option for another radar site in Western Australia. It became operational on March 28, 2020.

The operation's headquarters were at Dahlgren, Virginia, and radar stations were spread out across the continental United States at roughly the level of the 33rd parallel north.

== Description ==
There were three transmitter sites in the system:

- 216.983 MHz at Lake Kickapoo, Texas (33°32′47″N 98°45′46″W) (Master transmitter)
- 216.970 MHz at Gila River, Arizona (33°06′32″N 112°01′45″W)
- 216.990 MHz at Jordan Lake, Alabama (32°39′33″N 86°15′52″W)

The master transmitter at Lake Kickapoo was said to be the most powerful continuous wave (CW) station in the world, at 768 kW radiated power on 216.97927 MHz.

When the system became operational in 1961, the original frequency was 108.50 MHz (just above the FM broadcast band). In 1965, the "Fence" system was modernized with the operating frequency doubled to 216.98 MHz (just above Channel 13 in the VHF TV broadcast band) to obtain higher resolution and to locate smaller objects. This frequency was used until the Fence was decommissioned in 2013. Fill-in transmitter sites at Gila River and Jordan Lake used offset frequencies listed above from the early 1990s to 2013 to help better detect which transmitter "illuminated" an object in space, as multiple transmitters could have illuminated the same object at the same time. Overhead imagery (see coordinates given above) of the Gila River and Jordan Lake sites shows the original design at the lower frequency.

There were six receiving stations:

- San Diego, California (32°34′42″N 116°58′11″W)
- Elephant Butte, New Mexico (33°26′35″N 106°59′50″W)
- Red River, Arkansas (33°19′48″N 93°33′01″W)
- Silver Lake, Mississippi (33°08′42″N 91°01′16″W)
- Hawkinsville, Georgia (32°17′20″N 83°32′10″W)
- Tattnall, Georgia (32°02′35″N 81°55′21″W)

The following receiving stations were placed in cold storage in April 2013:

- Silver Lake, Mississippi (33°08′42″N 91°01′16″W)
- Tattnall, Georgia (32°02′35″N 81°55′21″W)

The receiving stations at Elephant Butte and Hawkinsville were considered to be "High Altitude" stations with longer and more complex antenna systems that are designed to see targets at higher altitudes than the other four receiving stations.

== History ==
Author Curtis Peebles notes that the original "Space Fence" or Space Surveillance System began operations in 1959. The system predated the formation of NORAD and was known as the U.S. Navy Space Surveillance System (or SPASUR or NAVSPASUR). From 1960 until the early 1990s the system was used in conjunction with a network of Baker-Nunn cameras that could see "an object the size of a basketball at 25,000 mi (40,000 km)".

The system was formerly operated by the U.S. Navy for NORAD from 1961 until October 2004. Initially independent as NAVSPASUR, it was run by Naval Space Command from 1993, and finally by Naval Network and Space Operations Command from 2002 until command was passed to the U.S. Air Force 20th Space Control Squadron on 1 October 2004.

In 2009, the operations and maintenance contract for the day-to-day management and operation of the Fence was awarded to Five Rivers Services, LLC, based in Colorado Springs, Colorado. On 30 September 2011, Five Rivers Services was awarded a US$7,022,503 firm fixed price with cost reimbursable line items contract modification to manage, operate, maintain, and logistically support the nine Air Force Space Surveillance System field stations, presumably for Fiscal Year 2012.

=== Plans for system upgrade: 2009 – 2012 ===
The 850th Electronic Systems Group, Electronic Systems Center awarded 3 US$30-million contracts to Lockheed Martin, Northrop Grumman and Raytheon Technologies on 11 June 2009.

A new Space Fence is envisioned to be a system of two or three S-band ground-based radars designed to perform uncued detection, tracking and accurate measurement of orbiting space objects. The Space Fence is intended to replace the Air Force Space Surveillance System, or VHF Fence, that was transferred from the U.S. Navy to the U.S. Air Force in 2004. The shorter wavelength of the S-band Space Fence allows for detection of much smaller satellites and debris.

The 10 February 2009, collision of a U.S. Iridium communications satellite (Iridium 33) and a Russian Cosmos 2251 communications satellite, which added hundreds more pieces of debris to the atmosphere, highlighted the need for more precise tracking of space objects.

Data collected from a new Space Fence's sensors would potentially feed into the Joint Space Operations Center Mission System, which is used to track objects orbiting the Earth, monitor space weather and assess foreign launches. Used by operators at the 614th Air and Space Operations Center at Vandenberg Air Force Base, California, the 614 AOC's 24-hour-a-day, seven-day-a-week support provides vigilance of global and theater operations and equips the Joint Functional Component Command for space operations with the tools to conduct command and control of space forces.

Plans to award the final contract had been stalled by U.S. budget sequestration in early 2013 and the AFSSS system was scheduled to be discontinued in October 2013 due to budget cuts.

=== 2013 Shutdown ===
On 1 August 2013, General William L. Shelton, commander of Air Force Space Command, directed that the Air Force Space Surveillance System (AFSSS) be closed and all sites vacated effective 1 October 2013. The main advantage of the system was its ability to provide uncued data on new objects as opposed to tracking objects based on existing information. However, the system was also said to be inherently inaccurate due to its dated design. Alternate operating modes for radars at Cavalier Space Force Station and Eglin AFB were devised to fulfill the mission to provide uncued data for new objects. Shelton also noted the confusion between the planned new S-band space fence and the old UHF AFSSS, which was commonly called the "space fence".The AFSSS was turned off September first. "It appears they pulled the plug at 00:00 UTC (6 a.m. Local MDT) on September 1st", reports engineer Stan Nelson, who was monitoring the radar using an antenna in Roswell. The radar's final echoes came from a Russian satellite and a sporadic meteor". The shutdown only affects the original Space Fence, not the new one contracted to be built by Lockheed Martin for deployment in Australia and the Marshall Islands.

== New space fence ==
A new space fence at Kwajalein Atoll in the Marshall Islands was declared operational on March 27, 2020. In 2014 Lockheed Martin won the contract to build the new S band space fence system at Kwajelein with an option for another radar site in Western Australia.

== See also ==
- GRAVES, in France
- Krona space object recognition station, in North Caucasus, Russia
  - Krona-N, in the Russian Far East
- List of military electronics of the United States
