= Space Fence =

US Space Force space surveillance system

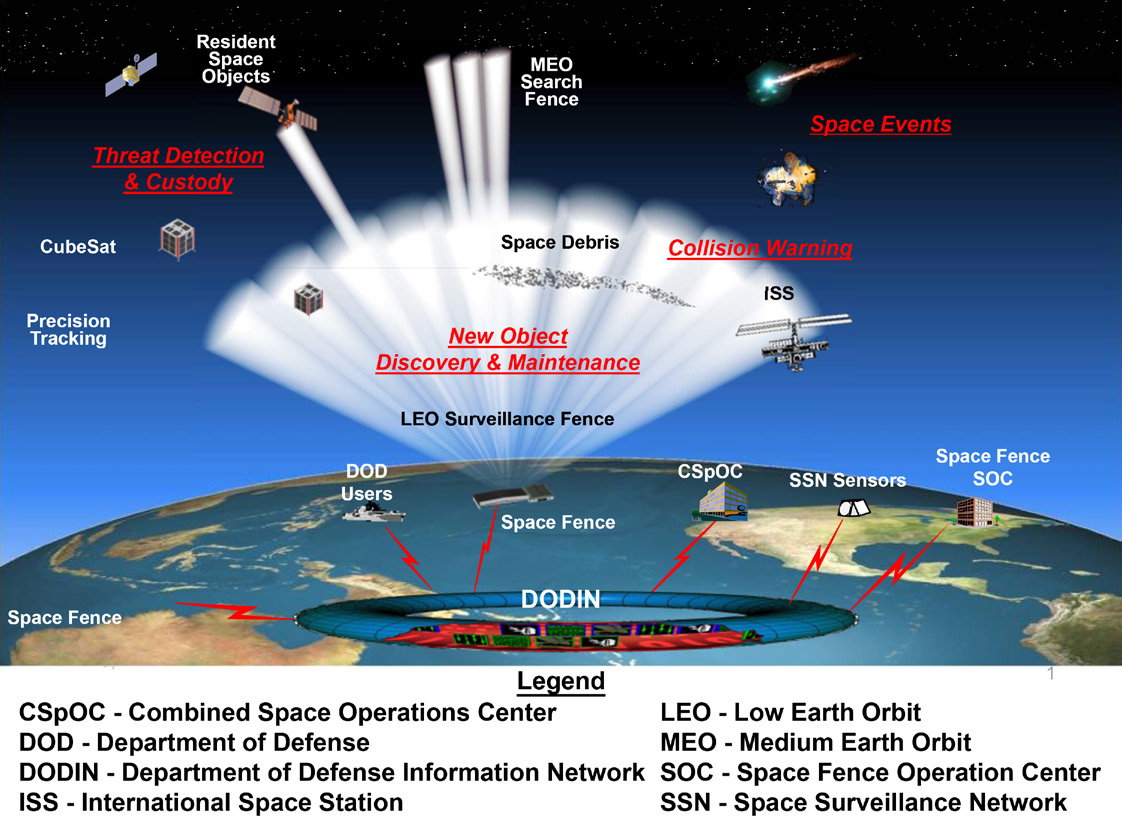
Diagram of the Space Fence

The Space Fence is a second-generation space surveillance system operated by the United States Space Force in order to track artificial satellites and space debris in Earth orbit. It was constructed and designed by Lockheed Martin, Northrop Grumman, and Raytheon starting in 2009, and declared operational in March 2020. The budget is US$1.594 billion (FY15). The main facility is located at Kwajalein Atoll in the Marshall Islands.

== History ==
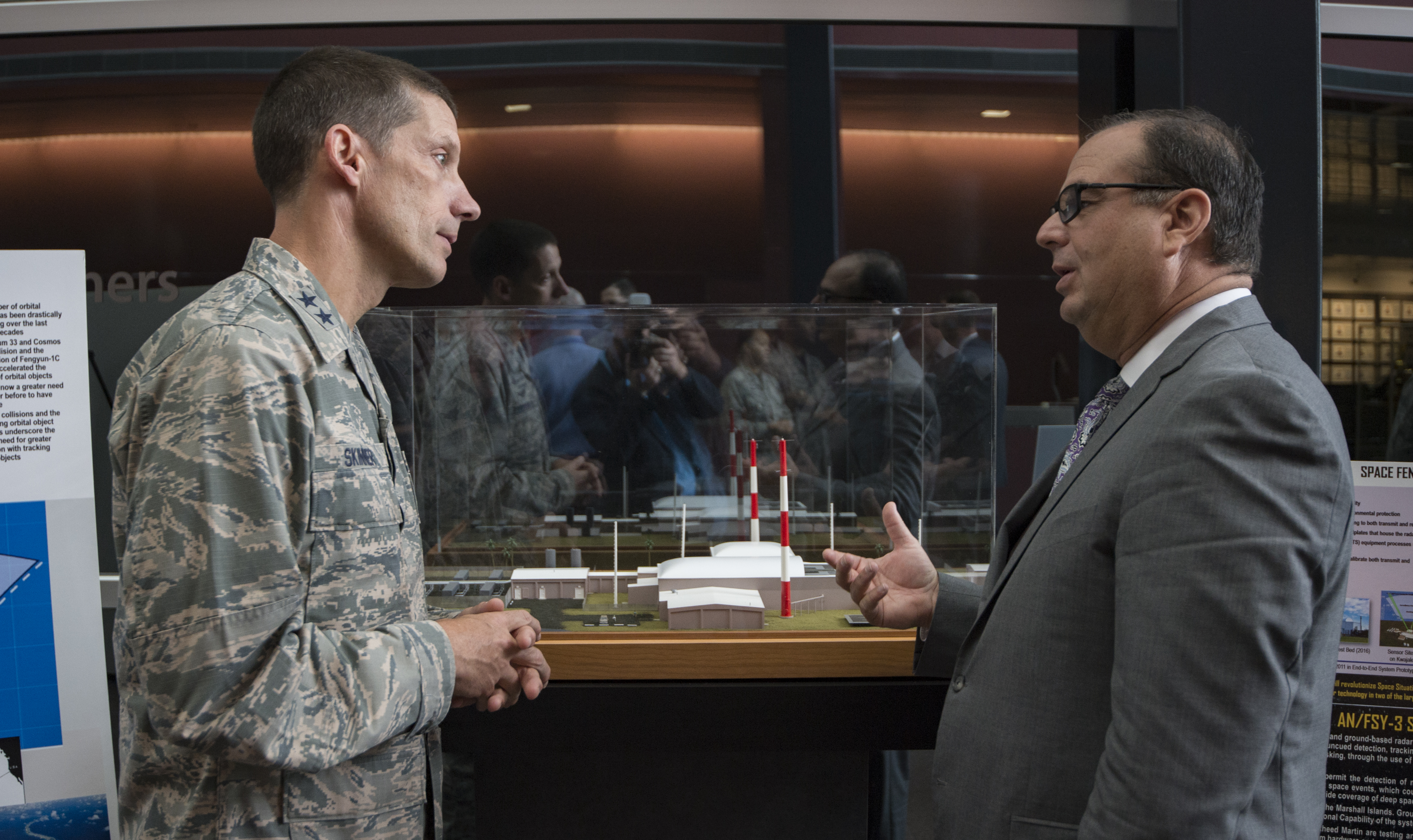
Deputy Commander of Air Force Space Command, accepts a model of the Space Fence radar site at Peterson Air Force Base.

The initial plans to upgrade the legacy Air Force Space Surveillance System were made in 2009. The USAF 850th Electronic Systems Group, Electronic Systems Center awarded three $30-million study contracts to Lockheed Martin, Northrop Grumman, General Dynamics, and Raytheon on 11 June 2009.

The new Space Fence was envisioned to be a system of two or three S-band ground-based radars designed to perform uncued detection, tracking and accurate measurement of orbiting space objects, and was intended to replace the Air Force Space Surveillance System, or VHF Fence, that was transferred from the US Navy to the US Air Force in 2004. The shorter wavelength of the S-band Space Fence will allow for the detection of much smaller satellites and debris.

The 2009 satellite collision of the Iridium 33 and Kosmos 2251 communications satellites, which added hundreds more pieces of debris in orbit, highlighted the need for more precise tracking of space objects.

As of 2009, data collected from the new Space Fence's sensors was planned to feed into the Joint Space Operations Center Mission System, which is used to track objects orbiting the Earth, monitor space weather, and assess foreign launches. Used by operators at the USAF 614th Air and Space Operations Center at Vandenberg Air Force Base, Calif., the 614 AOC's 24-hour-a-day, seven-day-a-week support provides vigilance of global and theater operations, and equips the Joint Functional Component Command for space operations with the tools to conduct command and control of space forces.

Plans to award the final contract were delayed by the federal government's budget sequestration in early 2013 and the AFSSS system was scheduled to be discontinued in October 2013 due to budget cuts.

In 2014, Lockheed Martin awarded a contract for the Space Fence ground structures to General Dynamics. The ground structures include the receive array, cooling equipment, radomes and other buildings. The primary Space Fence system is located on Kwajalein Atoll in the Marshall Islands. The U. S. Space Force declared the system operational on March 28, 2020.

== Technical characteristics ==
The Space Fence will use S-band radar and will track a larger number of small objects than previous space radars: "about 200,000 objects and make 1.5 million observations per day, about 10 times the number" made by existing or recently retired US assets.

== Data-sharing agreements ==
Countries with space situational awareness data-sharing agreements in place with the USAF include Australia, Japan, Italy, Canada, France, South Korea, and the United Kingdom. It also "has agreements with the European Space Agency and Europe’s Eumetsat weather satellite organization."

== Predecessor system ==
A previous system used by the USAF for the same purpose was the Air Force Space Surveillance System, which ceased operation in September 2013.
