= Revest-du-Bion =

- Commune
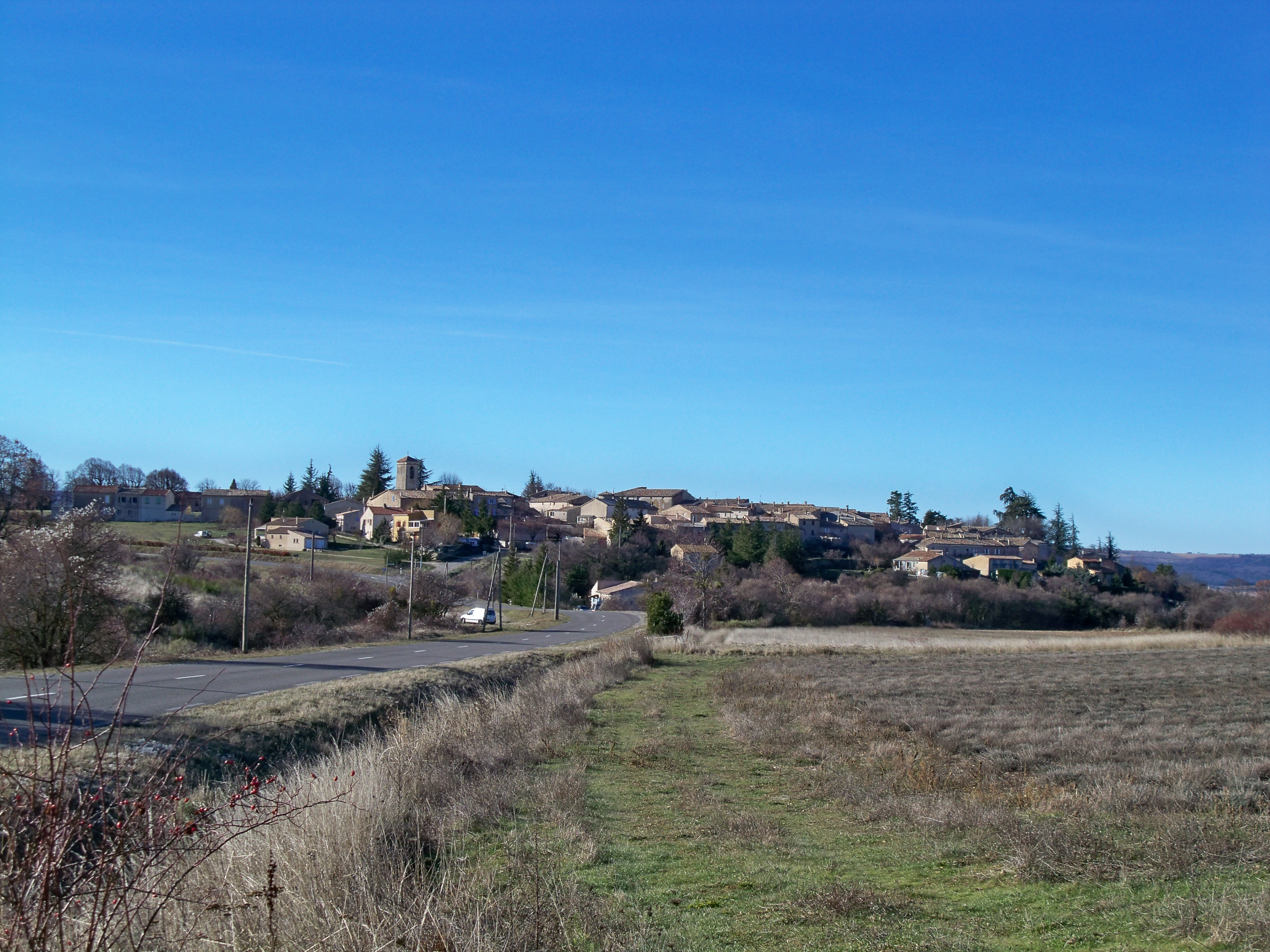
- A general view of the village of Revest-du-Bion

- Coat of arms
- Location of Revest-du-Bion
- Location within France Location within Provence-Alpes-Côte d'Azur
- Coordinates: 44°05′01″N 5°32′57″E
- Country: France
- Region: Provence-Alpes-Côte d'Azur
- Department: Alpes-de-Haute-Provence
- Arrondissement: Forcalquier
- Canton: Reillanne
- Intercommunality: Haute-Provence-Pays de Banon

Government
  - Mayor (2026–32): Bernard Granet
- Area^{1}: 43.45 km^{2} (16.78 sq mi)
- Elevation: 960 m (3,150 ft)
- Highest elevation: 1,365 m (4,478 ft)
- Lowest elevation: 833 m (2,733 ft)
- Population (2023): 480
  - Density: 11/km^{2} (29/sq mi)
- Time zone: UTC+01:00 (CET)
  - Summer (DST): UTC+02:00 (CEST)
- INSEE/Postal code: 04163 /04150
- ^{1} French Land Register data, which excludes lakes, ponds, glaciers > 1 km^{2} (0.386 sq mi or 247 acres) and river estuaries.

Revest-du-Bion is a commune in the Alpes-de-Haute-Provence department in southeastern France.

== Population ==
Historical population
Year	Pop.	±% p.a.
1968	601	—
1975	474	−3.33%
1982	494	+0.59%
1990	512	+0.45%
1999	463	−1.11%
2007	536	+1.85%
2012	585	+1.76%
2017	562	−0.80%
2023	480	−2.59%
Source: INSEE

== See also ==
- Communes of the Alpes-de-Haute-Provence department
- Notre-Dame de l'Ortiguière
