= GRAVES (system) =

French radar-based space surveillance system

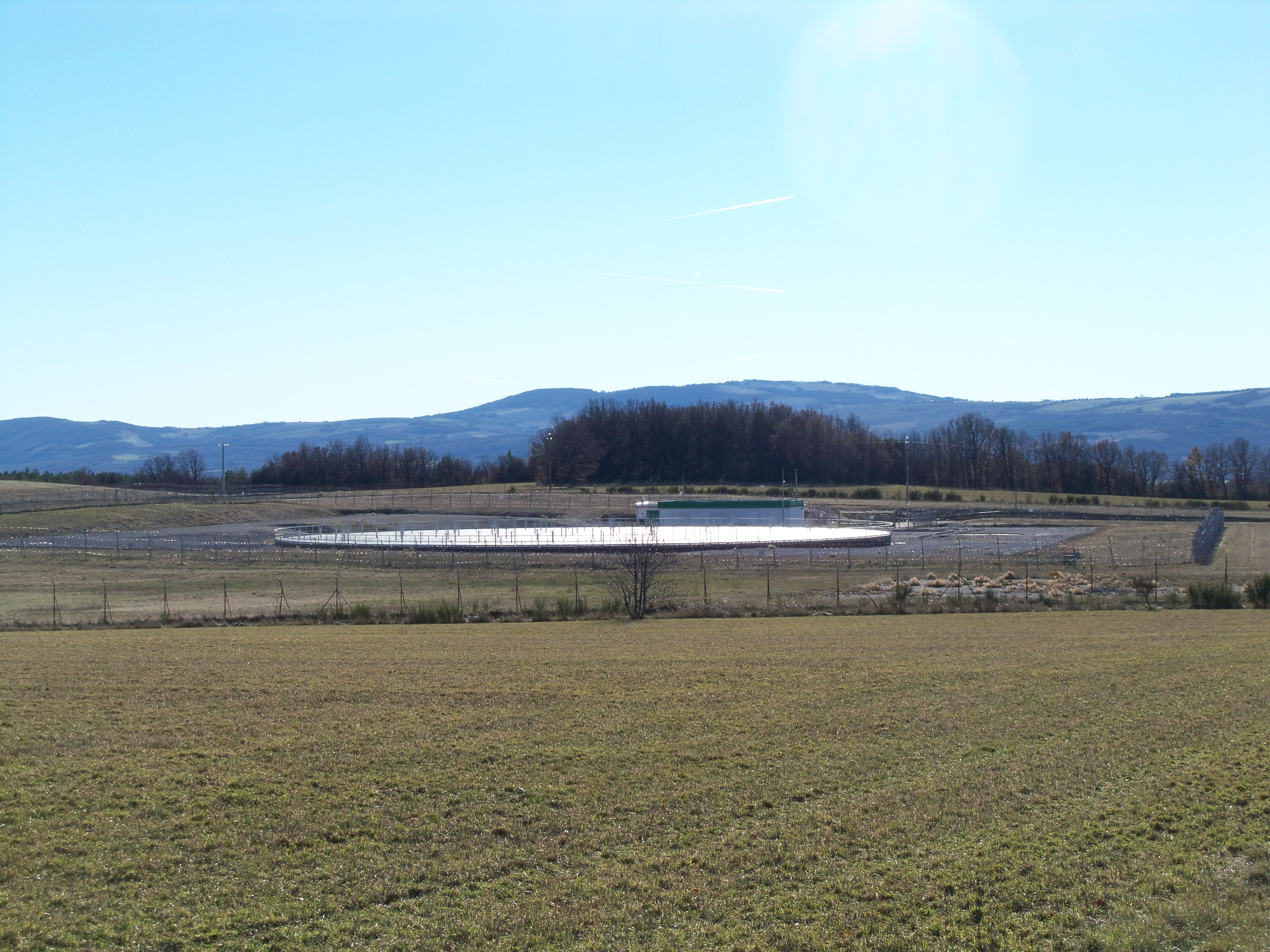
GRAVES reception site, Plateau d'Albion

GRAVES (French: Grand Réseau Adapté à la Veille Spatiale) is a French radar-based space surveillance system, akin to the United States Space Force Space Surveillance System.

== Space surveillance system ==
Using radar measurements, the French Air and Space Force is able to spot satellites orbiting the Earth and determine their orbit. The GRAVES system took 15 years to develop, and became operational in November, 2005. GRAVES is also a contributing system to the European Space Agency's Space Situational Awareness Programme (SSA).

GRAVES is a bistatic radar system using Doppler and directional information to derive the orbits of the detected satellites. Its operating frequency is 143.050 MHz, with the transmitter being located on a decommissioned airfield near Broye-lès-Pesmes at 47.3480°N 5.5151°E and the receiver at a former missile site near Revest-du-Bion on the Plateau d'Albion at 44.0715°N 5.5346°E. Data processing and generation of satellite orbital elements is performed at the Balard Air Complex in Paris, 48.835°N 2.280°E.
