= Respite Sanctuary =

Type of Catholic shrine

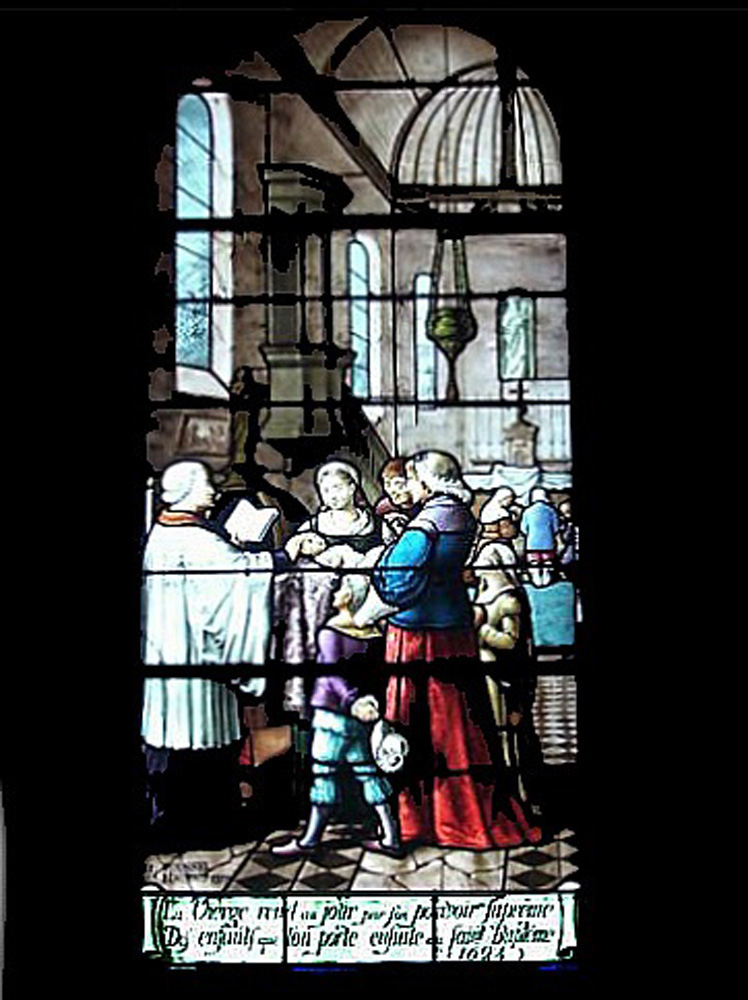
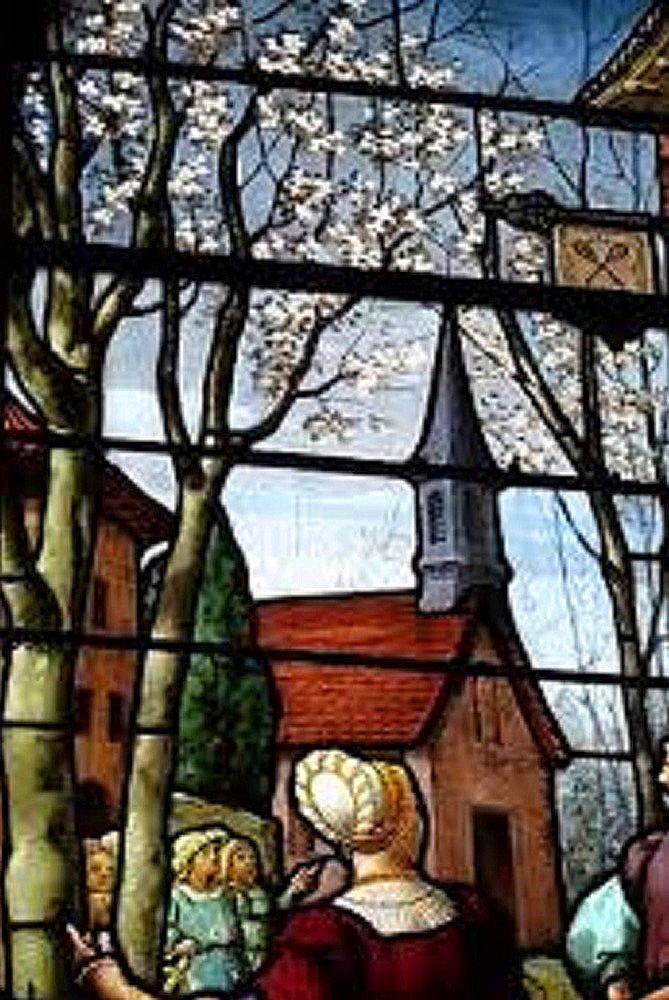
A baptism following a temporary revival depicted in a stained-glass window at Notre-Dame-des-Fleurs in Villembray. In the background of the left-hand window, the family awaits the répit: the child's body has been placed on the altar while the faithful pray. The inscription reads: "By her supreme power, the Virgin restores to life children who are then brought to holy Baptism. 1624." The right-hand window shows the church built to commemorate the miracle of the cherry tree blooming in midwinter.

A sanctuaire à répit (French for “respite sanctuary”) is a type of holy site found in regions with a Catholic tradition and associated with folk religion. According to popular belief in certain provinces, a répit ("respite") was the temporary return to life of a stillborn child, allowing the infant to receive baptism before dying permanently. Having been baptized, the child was believed to be able to enter Heaven rather than wander forever in Limbo, deprived of the vision of God. Such a respite was thought possible only at certain sanctuaries, most often dedicated to the Virgin Mary, whose intercession was believed necessary to obtain the miracle.

== Geographic and religious distribution of respite sanctuaries ==
Respite sanctuaries operated in Western Europe from the end of the 13th century until World War I. A total of 277 have been identified in France, 56 in Belgium, 14 in southern Germany, 38 in Austria, 30 in Switzerland, and 42 in the Aosta Valley and Piedmont. Because the Protestant Reformation condemned the practice, such sanctuaries were absent from Protestant regions.

Although the Catholic doctrine of baptism remained the same throughout Europe, the practice of the répit was virtually unknown in western France (except at Sainte-Anne-d'Auray, Saint-Martial of Limoges, and Saint-Jean-de-Côle in Dordogne), as well as across the Iberian Peninsula and much of Italy. Jacques Gélis attributes this to the existence of other rites, such as the "bridge baptism", which was practiced in Galicia. Pregnant women with high-risk pregnancies would gather at midnight on a bridge beneath a cross, where they were sprinkled with holy water in an aspersion ritual.

For all the points listed on this page: view them on OpenStreetMap, Bing Maps, or download them in KML format.

== The practice of the répit ==
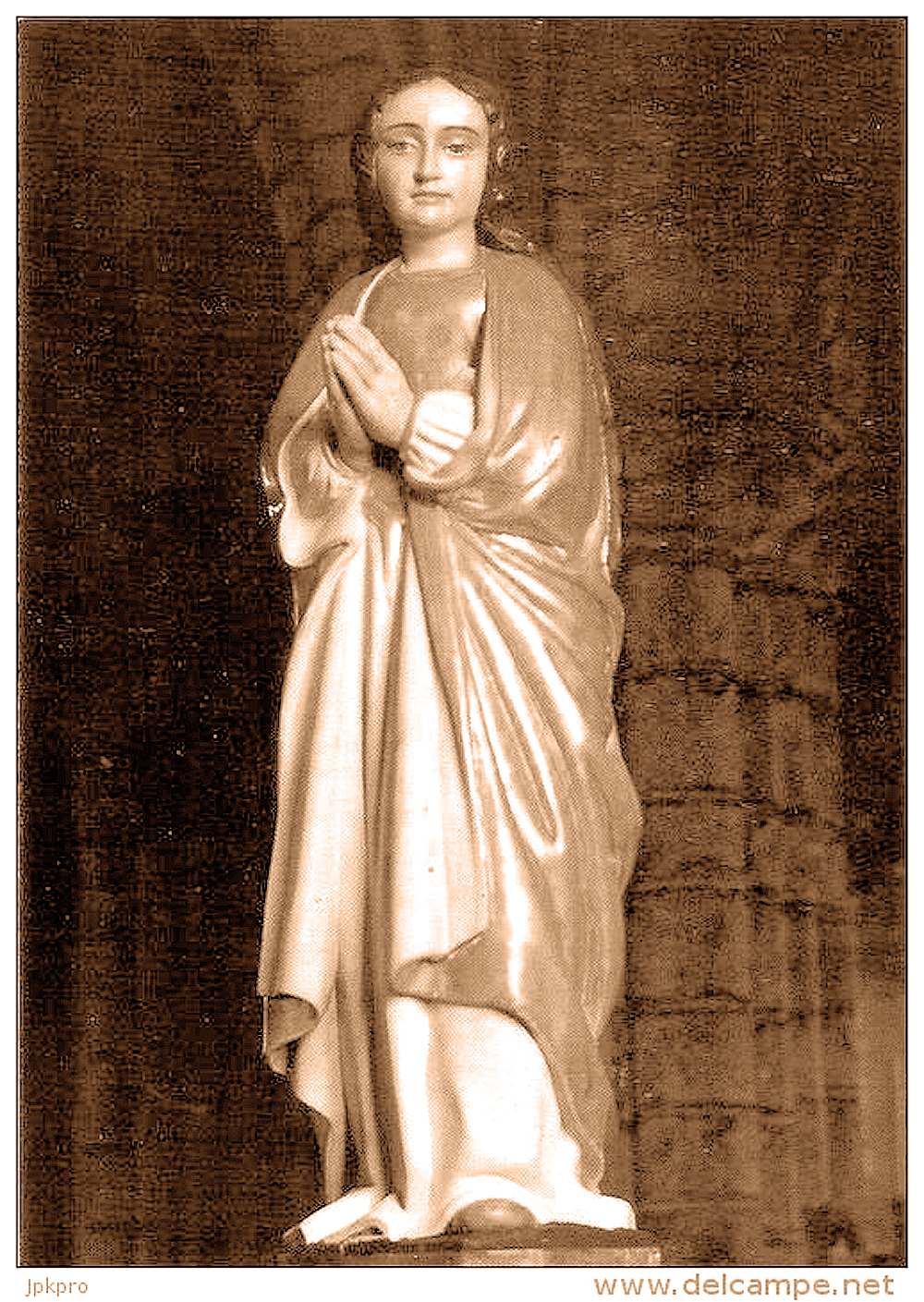
Notre-Dame de la Bonne Nouvelle, the miraculous Virgin of Montaigut.

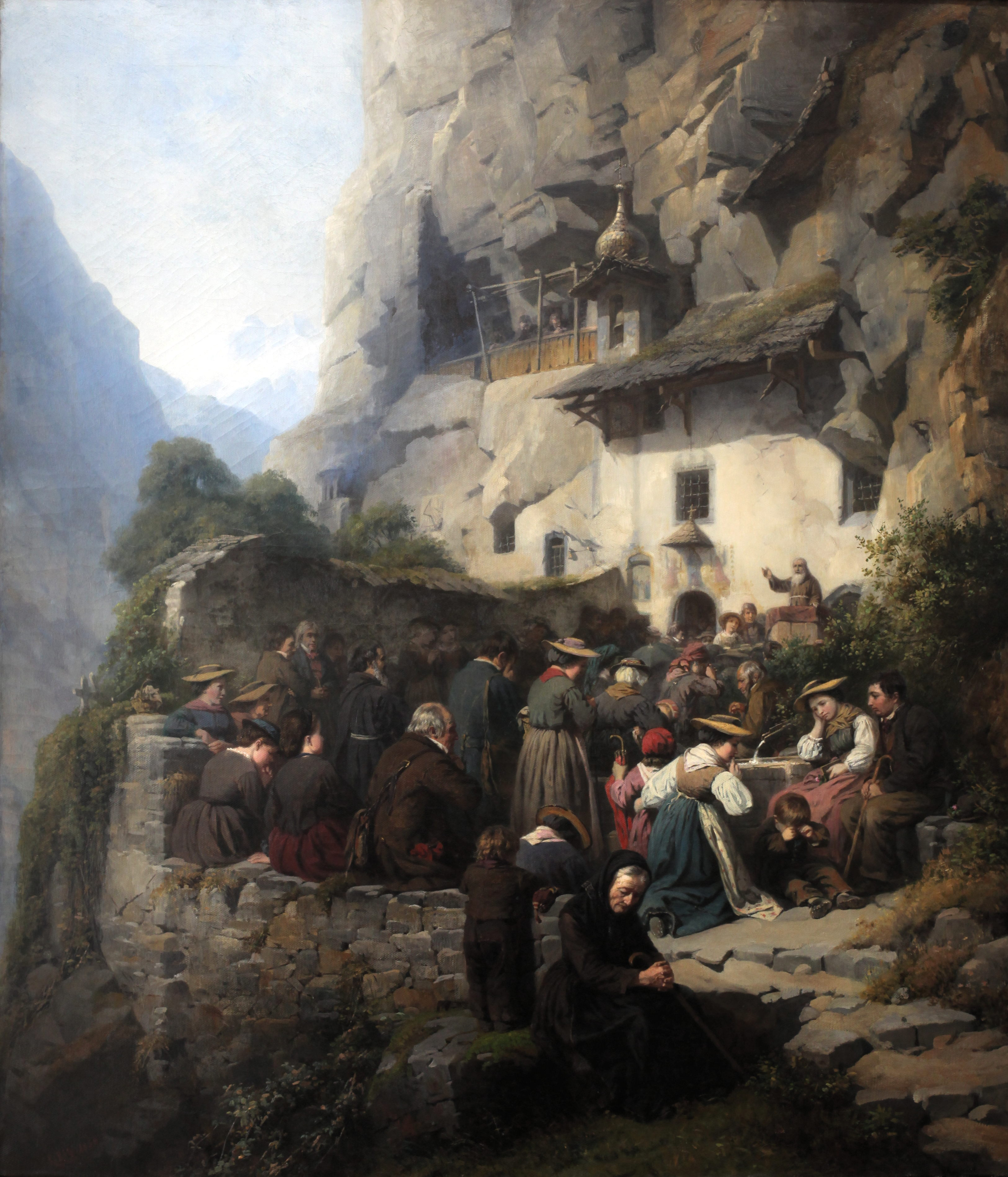
Pilgrimage to Longeborgne (Valais), 1868.

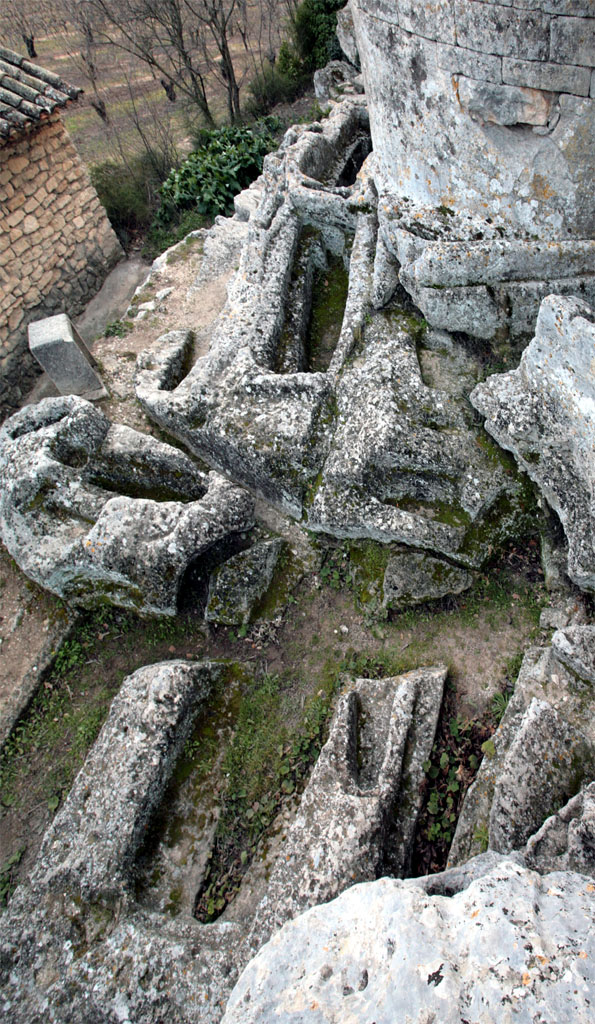
Rock-cut necropolis for children who died after temporary revival at the Church of Saint-Pantaléon.

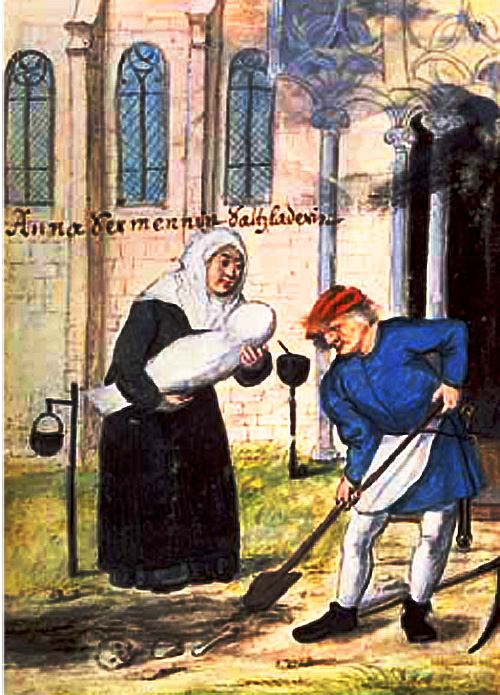
Burial of a newborn near a respite sanctuary, 15th century miniature.

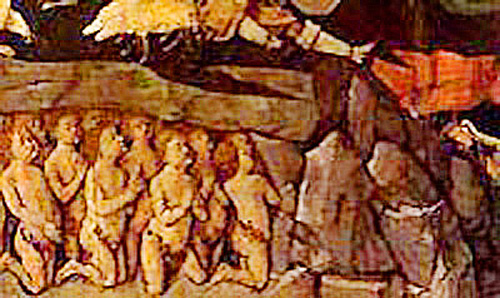
Enguerrand Quarton: a rare depiction of the limbus puerorum (Limbo of Infants) in the Coronation of the Virgin (1454).

"Religious beliefs until the 19th century made it possible to give a positive meaning to the loss of a child. If God sometimes chose to take back a child at the earliest age, it was paradoxically for the child's own good, because He wished to make the child a saint" explains the historian Marie-France Morel. As was then believed, any child baptized before the age of seven had not sin, and its soul went directly to Heaven. Having become an angel close to God, the child could then help ensure the salvation of its parents. The Church endorsed this belief. The death of a child was regarded as a sign of hope and was marked by hymns of thanksgiving. The funeral ritual featured no black garments but white ones, and instead of a funeral knell, joyful bell-ringing. The situation was very different, however, when a child died before receiving baptism, as their bodies could not be buried in consecrated ground and belonged to neither the community of the dead nor that of the living.

To the grief of losing a child was added the parents' inability to have the infant baptized. This inability to baptize the infant was considered especially serious because it condemned the deceased child to Limbo and prevented its burial in the parish cemetery. Limbo was regarded as the intermediate realm between Purgatory and Heaven, a concept developed by theologians during the 13th century.

The mother's pleas prompted relatives, accompanied by a godfather and a godmother, to carry the infant's body to a respite sanctuary. Stillborn children were often brought there within hours of childbirth. Upon arrival, the body was laid upon an altar, usually that of the Virgin Mary, who was believed capable of bringing about the child's temporary resurrection. Fervent prayers were then chanted by those present, usually joined by one or more priests attached to the sanctuary. Throughout the vigil, everyone watched for signs of life: bodily discharge, warmth, a flush appearing on the face—especially the cheeks or lips—or movement of a limb or the chest., Sometimes a feather was placed before the infant's lips. The movement of air caused by the heat of candles gave the impression that the child was breathing. Midwives or physicians trusted by the parish priest might be called upon to confirm these supposed signs of life, although they generally corresponded to well-known post-mortem phenomena in stillborn infants, such as the disappearance of rigor mortis or bile-stained meconium mistaken for blood. If any of these signs appeared, the respite, lasting only a few minutes, allowed one of the attending priests to baptize the child immediately. The infant, having become a Christian, was thereby received into the Church.

Permanent death followed shortly afterward, but those present found consolation in the belief that the child's soul had left the limbus puerorum and entered Heaven. The burial of the body after this "second death" is less well documented because the sources are largely silent on the matter. After the parish priest had recorded the miracle in the registers, the child was usually buried nearby. At Avioth and at the Church of Saint-Pantaléon in Vaucluse, for example, a special section of the cemetery was reserved for children who had experienced a respite.

The earliest respite sanctuary appears to have been at Blandy-les-Tours, where archaeologists discovered more than seventy graves of fetuses and newborns around the apse of an anonymous chapel that once occupied the site of the present castle, dating from the 10th to the 13th century. As at the church of Kintzheim, during baptisms parents buried the infant's body beneath the church gutter,, believing that rainwater would baptize it. The earliest officially recognized manifestation dates from 1387, at Avignon, on the tomb of Cardinal Pierre de Luxembourg. The archives of the best-known respite sanctuaries preserve hundreds of accounts of these events regarded as miraculous and recorded by priests: 459 cases at Faverney between 1569 and 1593; 138 cases at Notre-Dame d'Avioth between 1573 and 1625; and 336 cases between 1666 and 1673 at the Chapel of Notre-Dame de Beauvoir in Moustiers-Sainte-Marie. By contrast, only 63 children were recorded at Notre-Dame du Noyer in Cuiseaux between 1702 and 1867, as the Church's attitude toward the practice gradually became more lenient.

Archaeological excavations have provided new information. According to Otto von Sonnenberg, Bishop of Constance (1450–1491), who opposed the practice, more than 2,000 deceased infants were brought to Oberbüren, near Bern. After Protestant Bernese authorities demolished the sanctuary between 1528 and 1532, archaeologists excavated the adjoining cemetery between 1992 and 1997. They uncovered only 250 infant skeletons measuring between 15 and 47 centimetres in length and were able to establish the ages of the stillborn children: about one-third had been premature or miscarried fetuses.

There is no evidence that these accounts resulted from fraud or collective hallucination; rather, they appear to reflect the mistaken interpretation of physical changes associated with the decomposition of infant corpses—such as softening of the tissues, discoloration, bleeding, and intestinal noises—phenomena well documented by nineteenth-century forensic medicine. To contemporary witnesses, however, these signs appeared to be extraordinary.

== In Savoy and Haute-Provence: Two Respite Sanctuaries ==
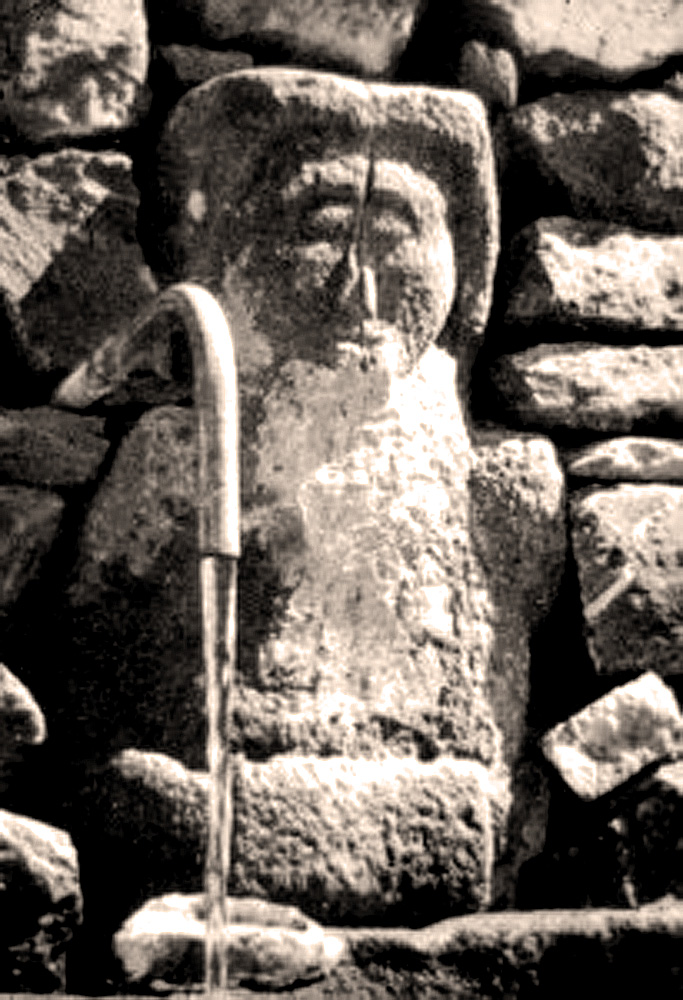
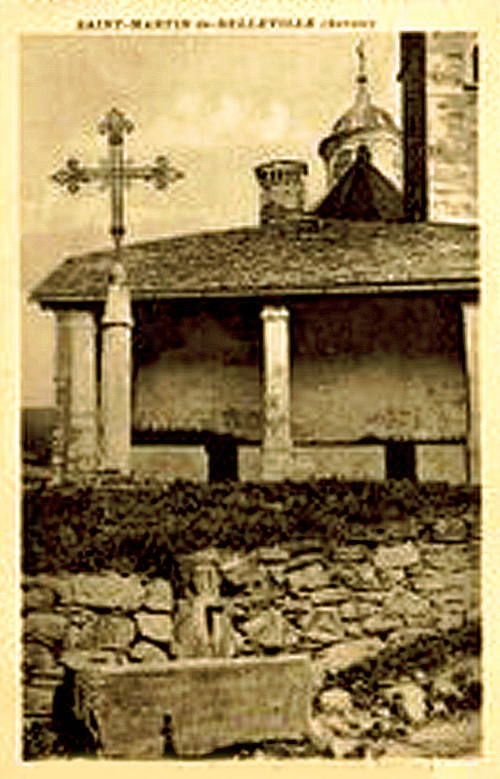
The spring of Notre-Dame-de-la-Vie at Saint-Martin-de-Belleville

Even the concept of Limbo (limbus puerorum) eventually became unacceptable, since innocent children could never enter Heaven. Furthermore, the rigorist clergy refused to baptize stillborn infants or bury them in consecrated ground, making recourse to these respite sanctuaries necessary. In some places, traces and memories of pre-Christian agro-pastoral cults have been identified: ancient sanctuaries situated near springs, stones, or trees, where statues—most often of a Black Madonna—mysterious carvings, or ancient deities were discovered.

At Saint-Martin-de-Belleville, an ancient stone goddess was associated with a sacred spring. Dating back to the Neolithic, the site had attracted thousands of people over the centuries, who came to drink its waters, perform ritual ablutions, and seek healing and other blessings. The site was eventually Christianized under the dedication of Notre-Dame-de-la-Vie. By the end of the Middle Ages, this ancient place of worship had become a respite sanctuary. The practice reached its peak during the 17th century, as attested by official records. One testimony from 1664 states that the parish priest declared that the infant had been seen opening its mouth and unclenching its fist, making it possible to administer baptism while pronouncing the conditional formula, "If you are alive, I baptize you."

But the clergy, who were rather reluctant to accept such practices, moved the goddess from her original location and incorporated her into the foundation wall of the newest chapel. This did not prevent Our Lady of Life from continuing to receive the devotion of the Savoyards. Her cult reached its peak in the 18th century. During this period, dozens of murals were painted in the chapel depicting stories of miraculous healings attributed to Our Lady of Life. An eyewitness account from 1930 describes one of the annual pilgrimages to the shrine. He saw women soaking clean sheets in water and dabbing their faces, eyes, and breasts. In many shrines, and as late as the 19th century, ritual baths were practiced, as the child’s body was placed under the stream of a fountain; sometimes it was even immersed several times in the icy water of the spring collected in a basin or pool, as at Frôlois or Venasque. But the ecclesiastical authorities had to wait until 1960 to permanently remove the ancient statue from its place and place it out of reach of the faithful in a covered and enclosed gallery within the church.

The Provençal chapel of Notre-Dame de l'Ortiguière, located on the Albion Plateau between Mount Lure and Mount Ventoux, became a place of pilgrimage somewhat later. Part of the parish of Le Revest-du-Bion, it was first mentioned in 1274 under the name ecclesia beatae Mariae de Silva in Albione, meaning Our Lady of the Forest of Albion. It was destroyed in 1392 by the armed bands of Raymond de Turenne, who left nothing of the original chapel standing. The chapel was rebuilt in 1665 following the discovery, among the nettles overgrowing its ruins, of a statue of the Black Madonna radiant with light. This is said to be the origin of the name “L’Ortiguière”.. In this sanctuary, four corbels in the shape of Atlantean heads from the original chapel were reused in the choir.“These four heads are remarkable for their technical diversity and symbolic richness,” whose themes are linked to Scandinavian mythology, “a unique and inexplicable case in the Mediterranean region.”

Carved capitals in the form of human heads associated with Norse mythology

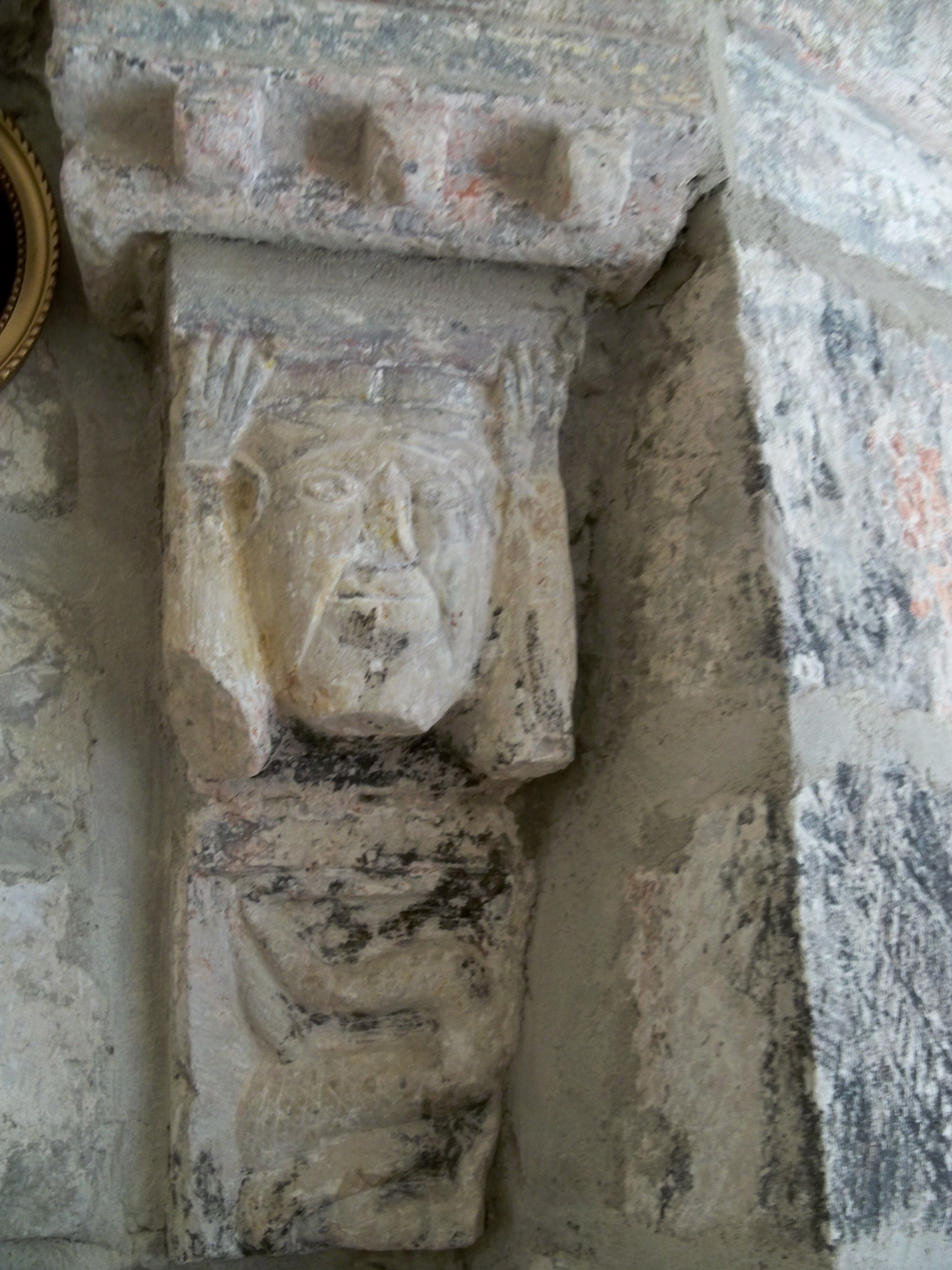
A peasant, wearing a bliaud, thrusting a spear into the jaws of a huge dragon

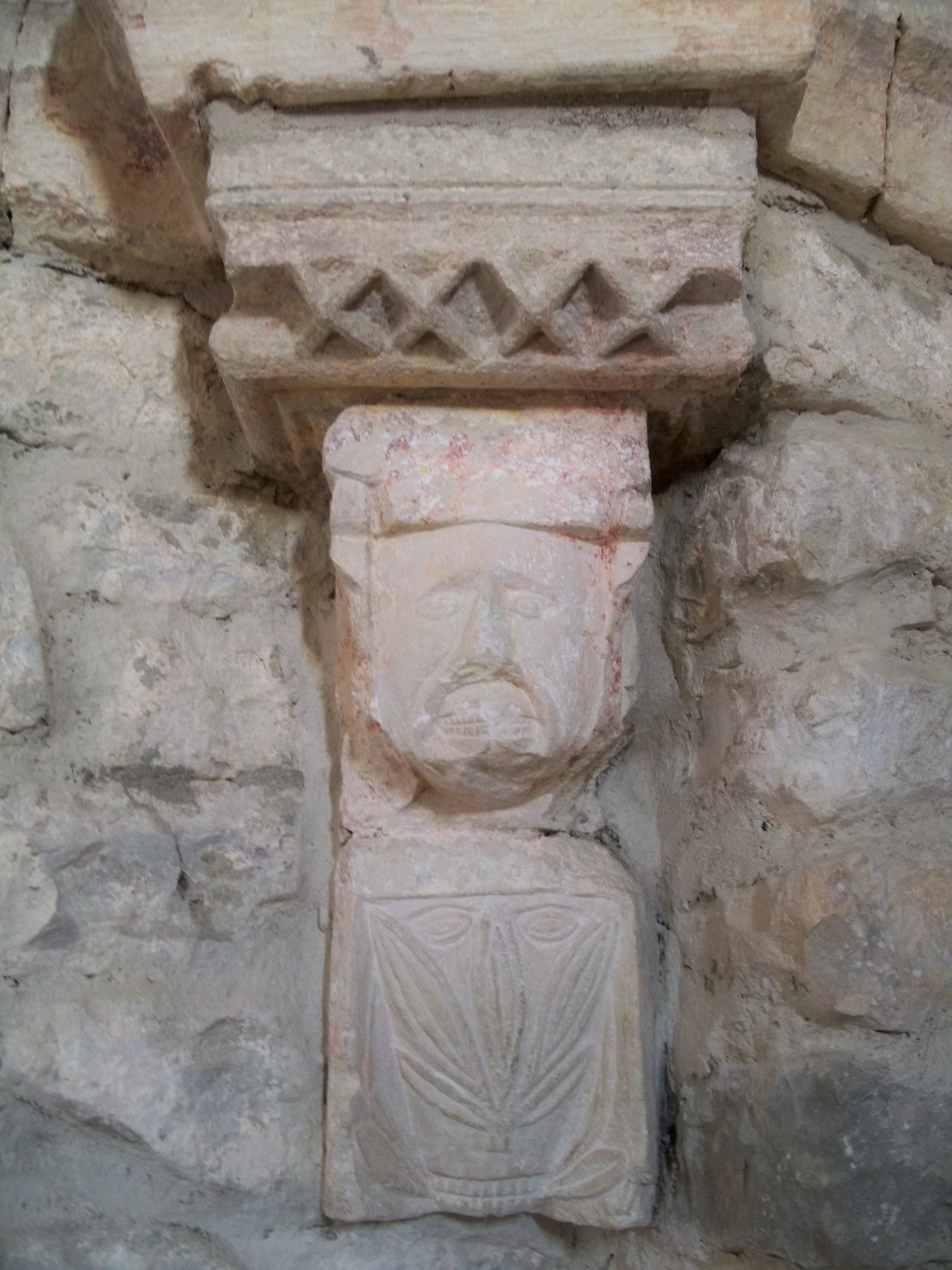
Grimacing human face emerging from a vegetal metamorphosis

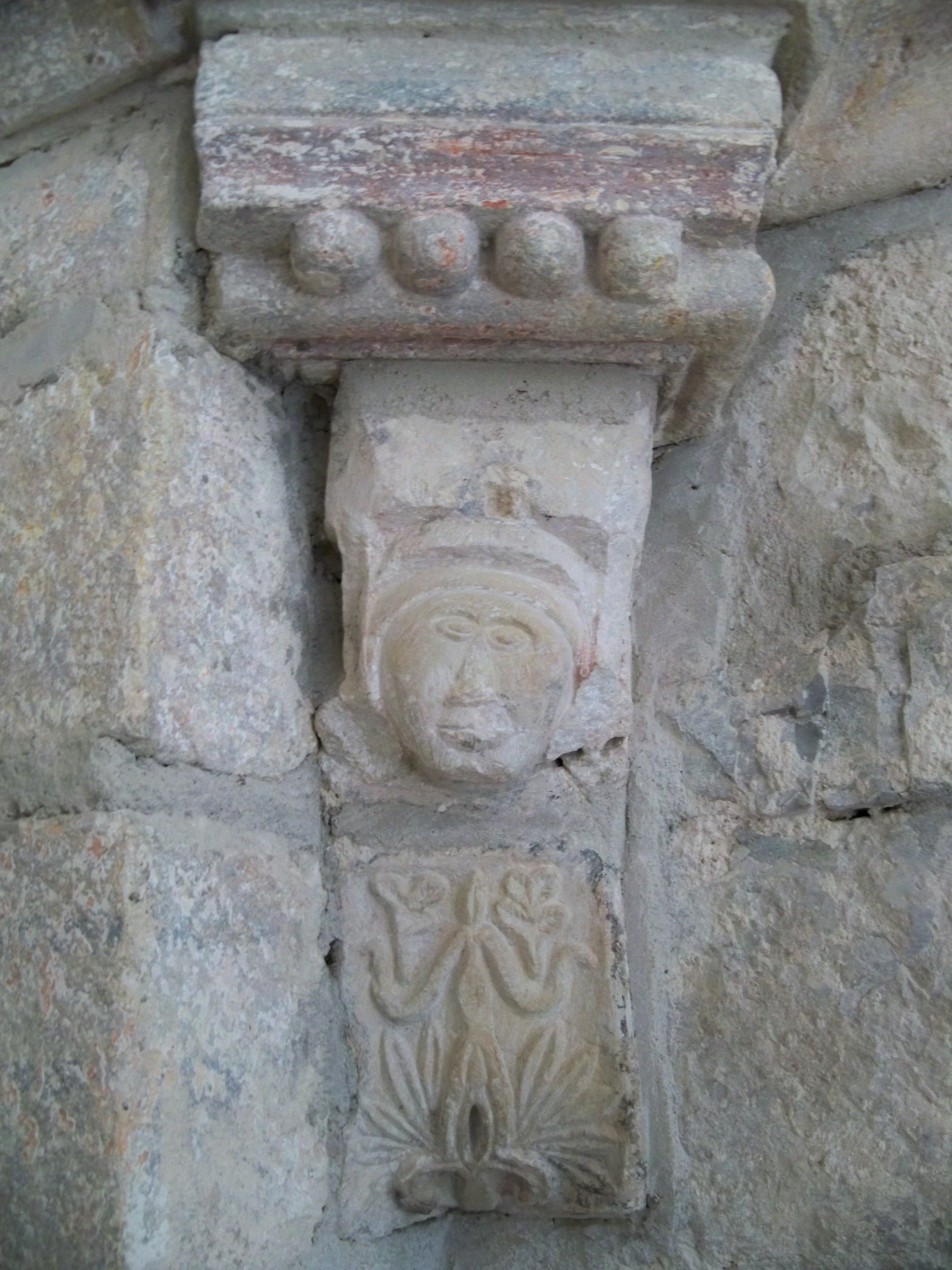
Female figure emerging from the Tree of Life

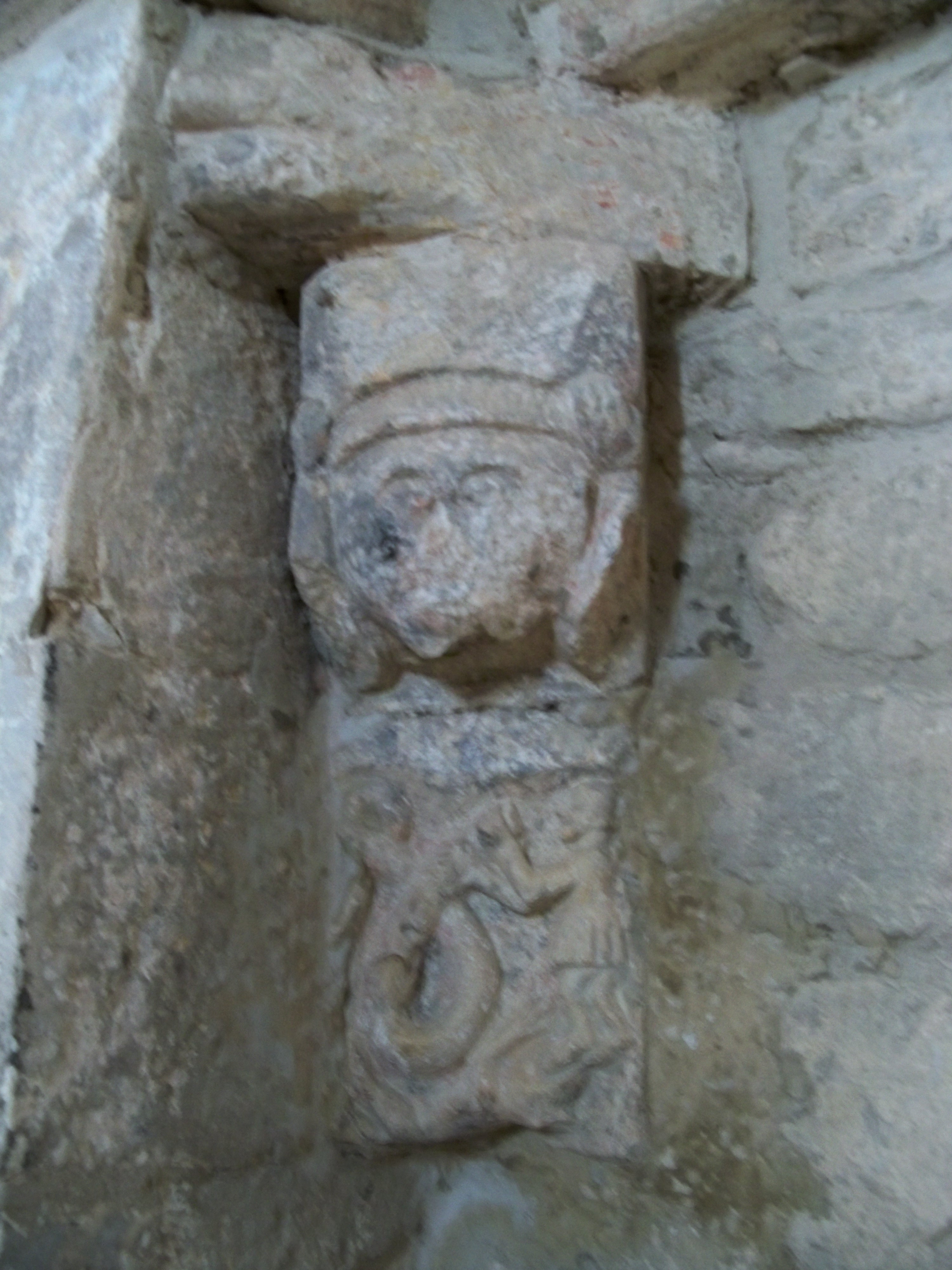
Serpent, symbol of Evil, coiled upon itself

This place of worship was henceforth entrusted to the care of a hermit. Soon, the hermit reported miracles and recorded them in official reports. The chapel then became a very popular pilgrimage site. Tradition holds that stillborn children brought there were revived or granted enough time to be baptized after showing signs of life. This phenomenon of respite or resuscitation was also attested at two shrines near Le Revest: the Chapel of Notre-Dame de Beauvoir in Moustiers-Sainte-Marie and the Church of Saint-Pantaléon at the foot of the Vaucluse Mountains. The statue of the Black Madonna disappeared in the 19th century—most likely stolen—which brought an end to the rite of resuscitation.

== Intercessory saints ==
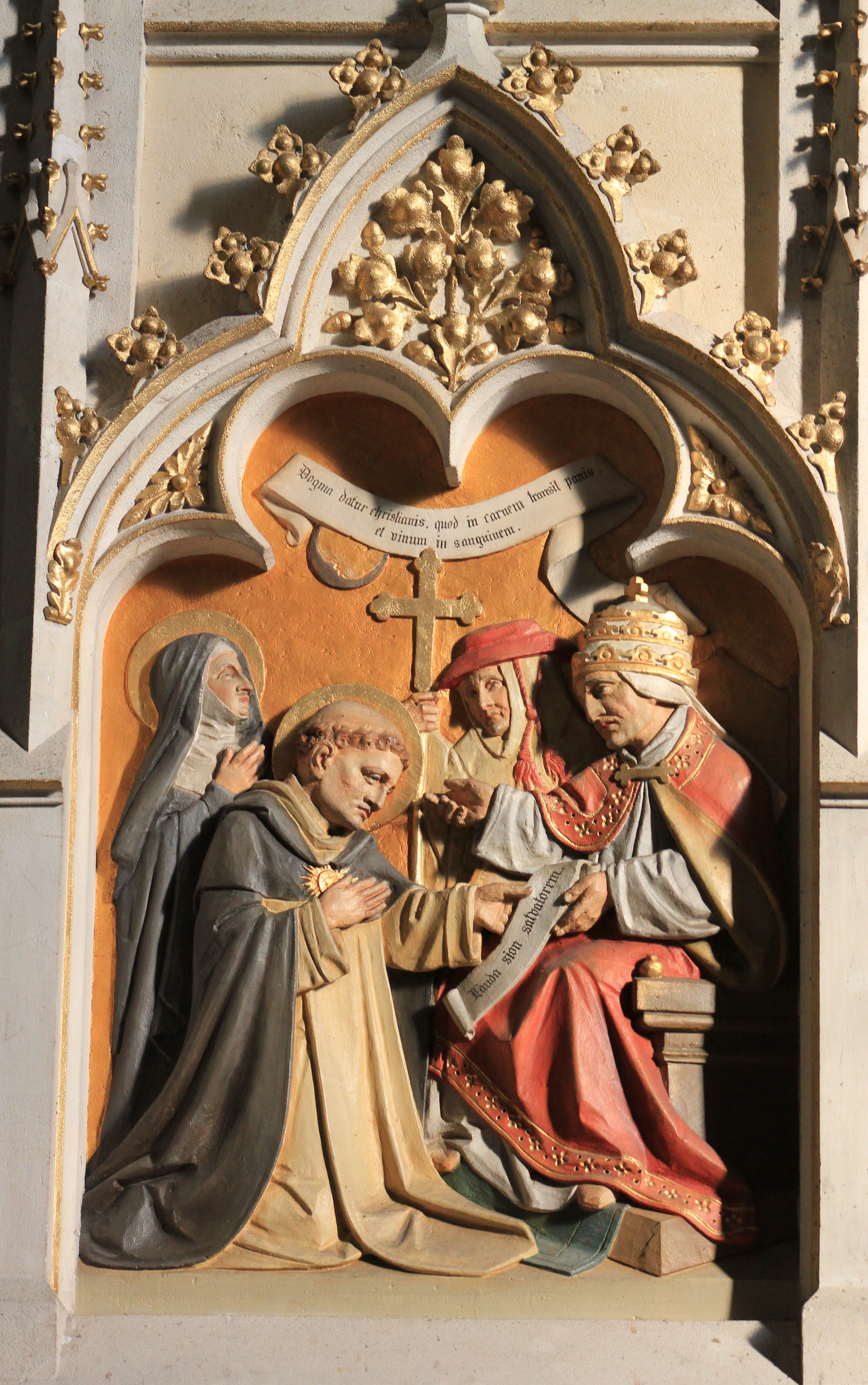
Thomas Aquinas

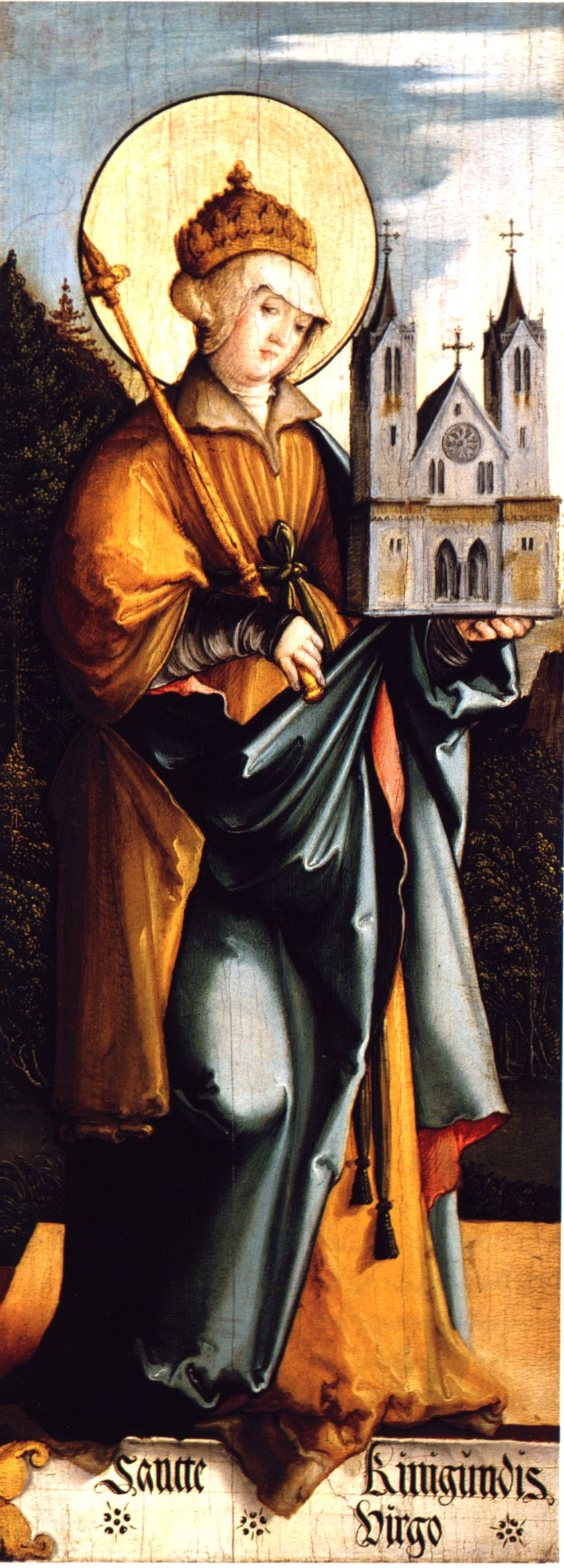
Saint Cunigunde

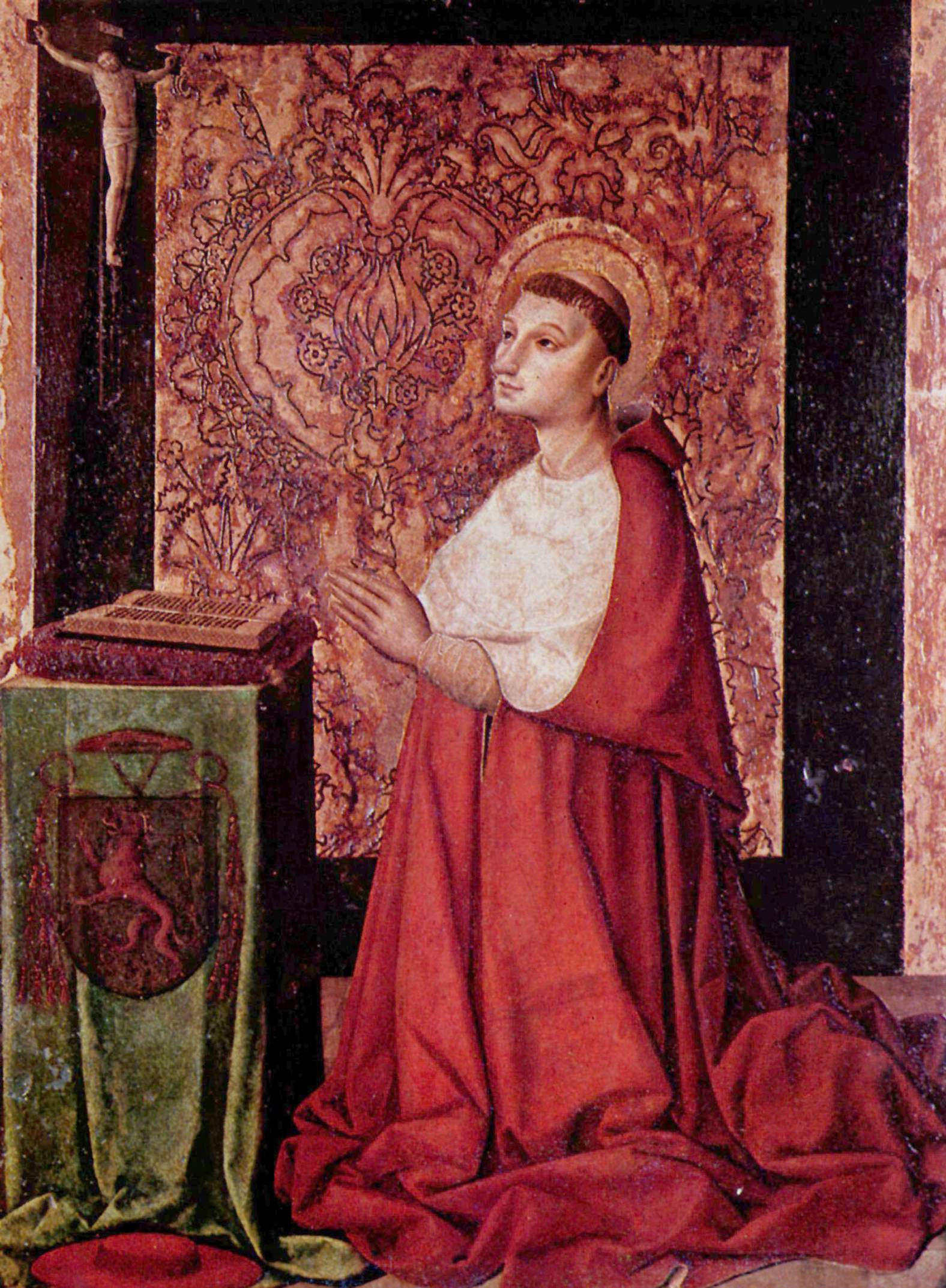
Peter of Luxembourg

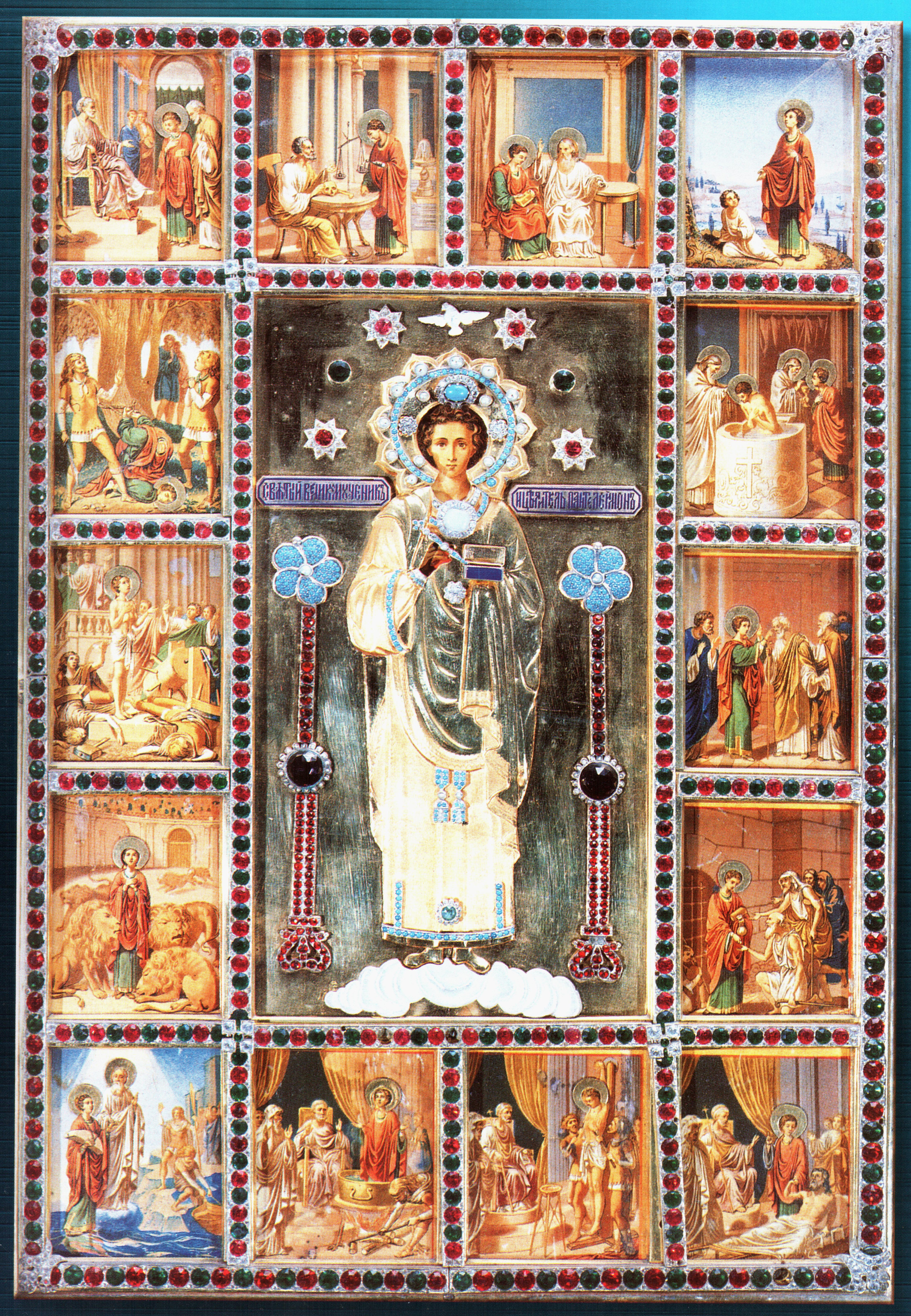
Saint Pantaleon

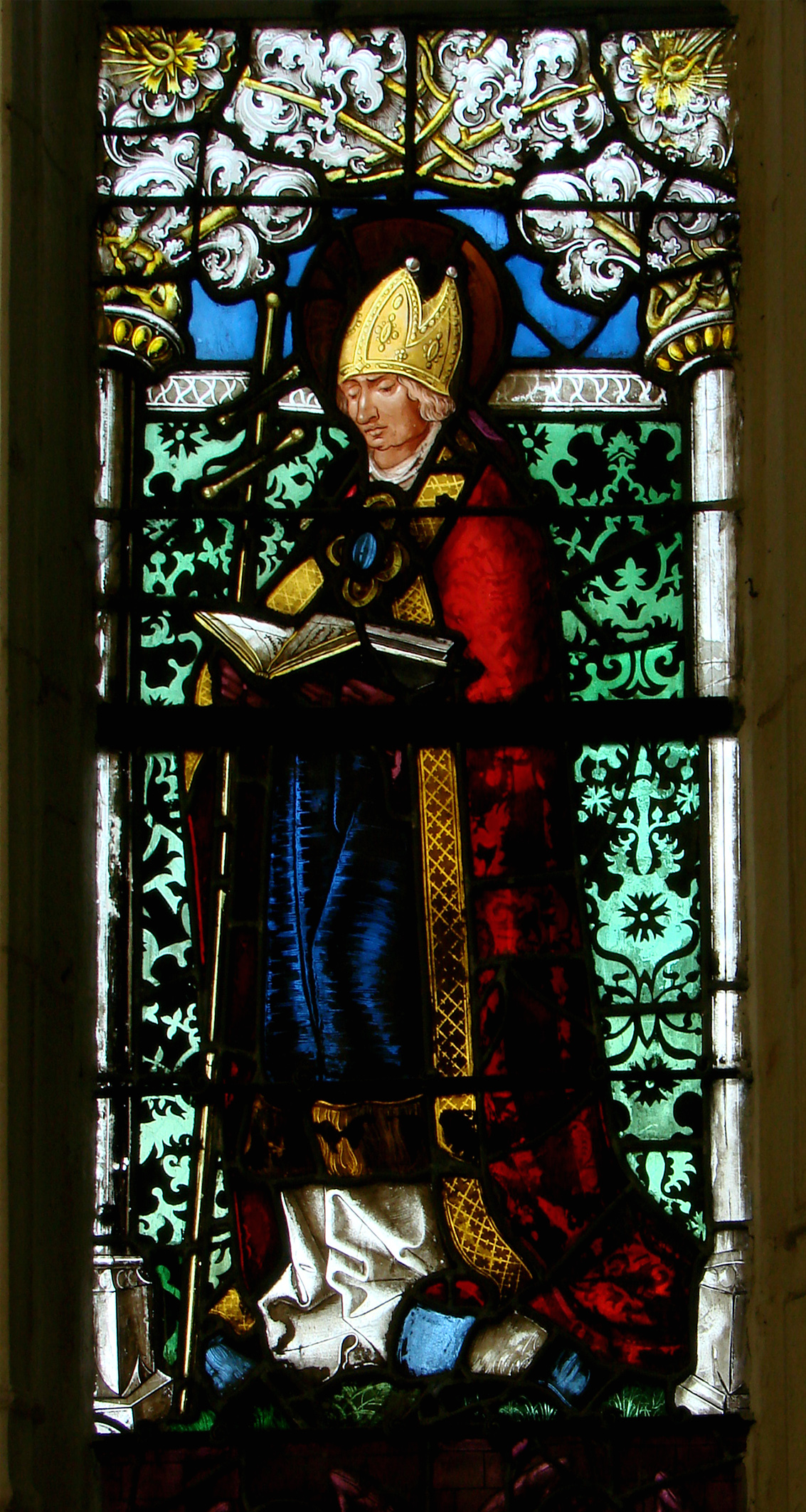
Saint Claude

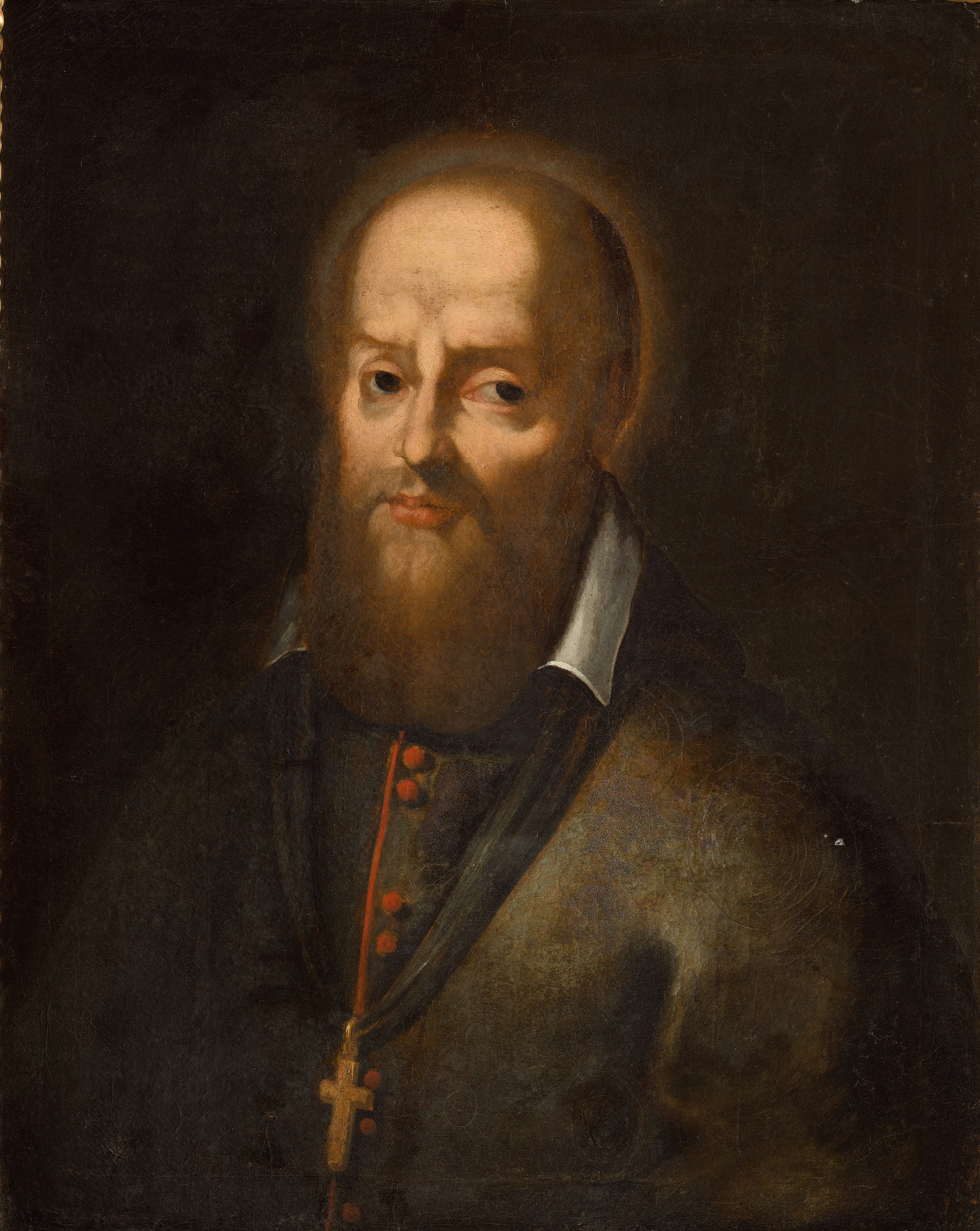
Francis de Sales

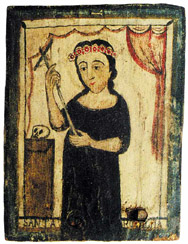
Saint Rosalia

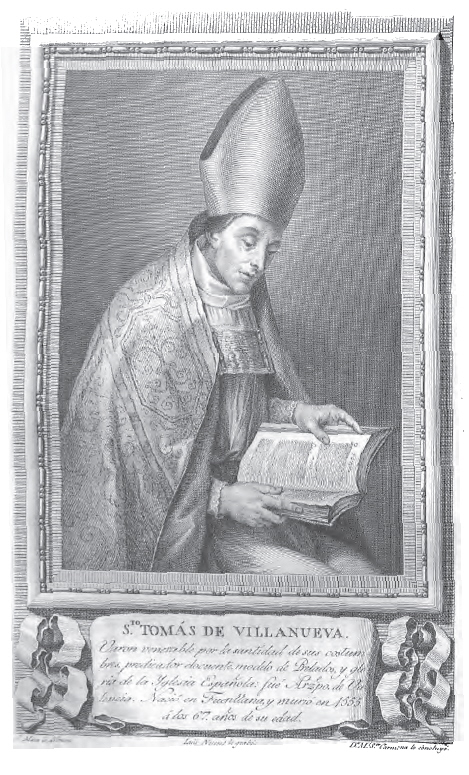
Thomas of Villanova

In the search for effective relief, in addition to Cardinal Pierre de Luxembourg and Francis de Sales—whose veneration was specific to the Comtat Venaissin and Savoy—people turned to intercessory saints such as Saint Pantaleon on both sides of the Alps, as well as, at the local or regional level, to saints chosen by the people, such as Saint Stephen, Saint Cunegonde, Saint Leontius, Saint Rosalie, Saint Thomas of Villeneuve, Saint Thomas Aquinas, Saint Viventius, Saint Edme, and Saint Claude.

== The Church's attitude toward respite sanctuaries ==
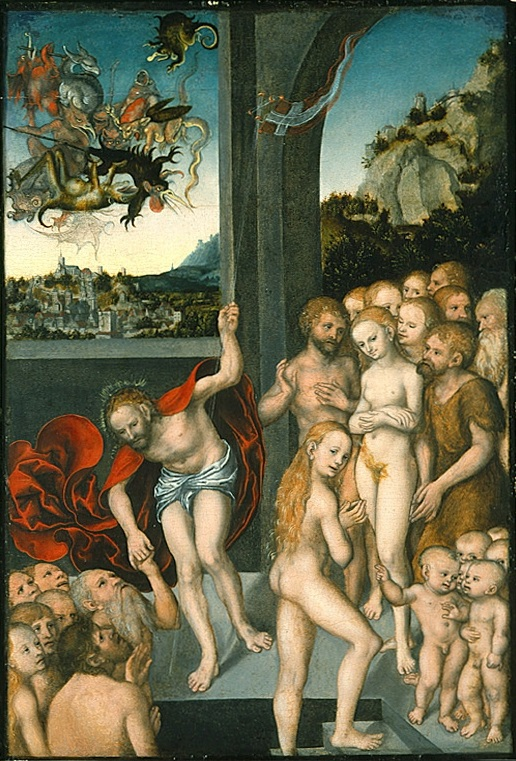
Limbo, by Lucas Cranach the Elder, 1530

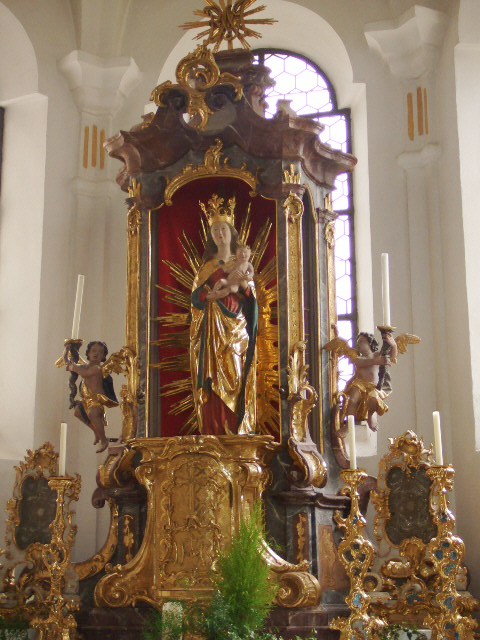
Virgin Mary in the abbey church of Ursberg

The practice continued for at least seven centuries. As Jacques Gélis points out, it affected thousands of families, "although it is clear that most stillborn children were not taken to a respite sanctuary." During the late Middle Ages, the Church itself encouraged the practice by reaffirming that only baptism could ensure salvation. As Gélis explains, "It was therefore the advance of Christianization, a more demanding—even uncompromising—pastoral policy, and the restrictions placed on certain birth-related rites that gave rise to the recourse to respite sanctuaries. The high point of this practice occurred during the Catholic Reformation, from the Council of Trent until the end of the 17th century."

This expansion, however, eventually escaped the Church's control. Ecclesiastical authorities found themselves confronted both by popular religious fervor and by the activism of certain religious orders. Miracles were sometimes encouraged or even fabricated to enhance a sanctuary's spiritual prestige and material prosperity. Increasing suspicion on the part of Church authorities ultimately led to the rejection of the practice. Depending on the period and locality, bishops either condemned or tolerated respite sanctuaries. The practice was condemned by the Synod of Langres in 1452 and by the synod of Sens in 1524. The bishops of Lyon (1577), Besançon (1592 and 1656), and Toul (1658) likewise denounced the practice, although in reality many of the faithful ignored these prohibitions. When respite rituals were banned at a well-known sanctuary, families either turned to substitute locations or simply continued the practice without any official record being entered into the sanctuary's registers.

It was not until 1729, following a large number of reported respite miracles in Bavaria and Swabia, that the Roman hierarchy issued its first formal condemnation, which was reaffirmed four times during the following years. Since the beginning of the 18th century, the Premonstratensians at Ursberg, in Swabia, had attracted pilgrims from more than one hundred kilometres away. In 1750, wishing to examine the reported miracles at this major sanctuary, the Roman Curia sent the Bavarian Benedictine Eusebius Amort to investigate. A distinguished theologian, Amort witnessed a supposed revival that concluded with a conditional baptism. Although deeply affected by what he observed, he remained convinced that most of the supposedly miraculously revived infants had shown no real signs of life. Based on his investigation, Pope Benedict XIV reiterated in 1755 the absolute necessity of unmistakable evidence of life. In particular, he noted that no one had ever observed crying or moaning, which he regarded as indisputable signs of life.

The uncompromising position adopted by the papacy after 1729 was implemented with varying degrees of strictness at the local level. Bishops did not respond uniformly, and traditional practices continued in many places. During the 19th century, respite sanctuaries experienced a revival in popularity, as evidenced by the large number of paintings and stained-glass windows depicting the miracle. However, the practice gradually declined as the Church's doctrine became less rigorous. By the middle of the century, with the rise of Marian devotion—particularly following the reported apparitions of the Virgin Mary at La Salette and Lourdes—a certain relaxation of attitudes became apparent. Nevertheless, respite sanctuaries continued to decline in the face of the growing influence of rationalism. The last of these sanctuaries ceased to attract pilgrims shortly after the First World War.

Today, the issue is far less pressing, as the Vatican now regards the concept of Limbo as one theological hypothesis among others. On 20 April 2007, the International Theological Commission of the Catholic Church declared that Limbo reflects an unduly restrictive understanding of salvation and should not be regarded as a "truth of faith". Yet the mystery remains of "that being whose destiny was abruptly cut short, born into and departed from the world at the same instant, challenging each of us to reflect on what constitutes the span of a human life, and indeed on the meaning of life itself."

== See also ==
- Emergency baptism
- Infant baptism
- Cillín (burial places for unbaptized children in Ireland)

== Bibliography ==
- Saintyves, Pierre (1911). "Les résurrections d'enfants mort-nés et les sanctuaires à répit" (PDF). Revue d'ethnographie et de sociologie (3–4).
- Gélis, Jacques. L'arbre et le fruit: La naissance dans l'Occident moderne, 16th–19th centuries. Paris: Fayard, 1984.
- Gélis, Jacques. Les enfants des limbes: Mort-nés et parents dans l'Europe chrétienne. Paris: Audibert, 2006.
- Mattioli Carcano, Fiorella. Santuari a répit: Il rito del ritorno alla vita o "doppia morte" nei santuari alpini. Ivrea: Priuli & Verlucca, 2009.
- Morel, Marie-France. "La mort d'un bébé au fil de l'histoire." Spirale, no. 31 (2004): 15–34.
- Teruggi, Francesco, and Fabio Casalini. Mai Vivi, Mai Morti. Borgomanero: Giuliano Ladolfi Editore, 2015.
- Carron, Diane. "Résurrections de nourrissons le temps du baptême catholique: mythes et réalités du sanctuaire 'à répit' comme lieu d'inhumation." In Rencontres autour de la mort des tout-petits. Mortalité fœtale et infantile, edited by E. Portat, M. Detante, C. Buquet-Marcon, and M. Guillon, 259–269. Saint-Germain-en-Laye, 2016.
