= List of Proton launches (1990–1999) =

Launches of the Proton rocket

This is a list of launches made by the Proton rocket between 1990 and 1999. All launches were conducted from the Baikonur Cosmodrome.

== Launches ==
Date/time (UTC)	Configuration	Serial number	Launch pad	Outcome
Date/time (UTC)	Payload	Separation orbit	Operator	Function
Date/time (UTC)	Remarks			
=== 1990 ===
15 February 1990; 07:52:00	Proton-K/DM-2 8K82K/11S861	363-02	Site 81/23	Successful
15 February 1990; 07:52:00	Gran' #35L (Raduga)	Geosynchronous		Communications
19 May 1990; 08:32:33	Proton-K/DM-2 8K82K/11S861	350-01	Site 200/40	Successful
19 May 1990; 08:32:33	Kosmos 2079 (Uragan #46L)	Medium Earth		Navigation
19 May 1990; 08:32:33	Kosmos 2080 (Uragan #51L)	Medium Earth		Navigation
19 May 1990; 08:32:33	Kosmos 2081 (Uragan #52L)	Medium Earth		Navigation
31 May 1990; 10:33:20	Proton-K 8K82K	360-01	Site 200/39	Successful
31 May 1990; 10:33:20	Kristall	Low Earth		Space Station module
31 May 1990; 10:33:20	Fourth module of Mir			
20 June 1990; 23:36:00	Proton-K/DM 8K82K/11S86	342-02	Site 200/40	Successful
20 June 1990; 23:36:00	Gorizont #30L	Geosynchronous		Communications
20 June 1990; 23:36:00	Final Proton-K launch with original Block DM upper stage			
18 July 1990; 21:46:00	Proton-K/DM-2 8K82K/11S861	340-01	Site 200/39	Successful
18 July 1990; 21:46:00	Kosmos 2085 (Geizer #17L)	Geosynchronous		Communications
9 August 1990; 20:18:59	Proton-K/DM-2 8K82K/11S861	345-02	Site 200/39	Failure
9 August 1990; 20:18:59	Ekran-M #14L	Geosynchronous		Communications
9 August 1990; 20:18:59	Third stage lost thrust due to a cleaning rag accidentally left inside the propellant feed system, preventing the flow of oxidizer to the engine. Automatic shutdown T+349 seconds.			
3 November 1990; 14:39:59	Proton-K/DM-2 8K82K/11S861	370-01	Site 81/23	Successful
3 November 1990; 14:39:59	Gorizont #32L	Geosynchronous		Communications
23 November 1990; 13:21:59	Proton-K/DM-2 8K82K/11S861	348-02	Site 200/39	Successful
23 November 1990; 13:21:59	Gorizont #33L	Geosynchronous		Communications
8 December 1990; 02:43:00	Proton-K/DM-2 8K82K/11S861	366-02	Site 200/40	Successful
8 December 1990; 02:43:00	Kosmos 2109 (Uragan #47L)	Medium Earth		Navigation
8 December 1990; 02:43:00	Kosmos 2110 (Uragan #48L)	Medium Earth		Navigation
8 December 1990; 02:43:00	Kosmos 2111 (Uragan #49L)	Medium Earth		Navigation
20 December 1990; 11:35:00	Proton-K/DM-2 8K82K/11S861	361-01	Site 81/23	Successful
20 December 1990; 11:35:00	Gran' #37L (Raduga)	Geosynchronous		Communications
27 December 1990; 11:08:00	Proton-K/DM-2 8K82K/11S861	342-01	Site 200/39	Successful
27 December 1990; 11:08:00	Globus #12 (Raduga-1)	Geosynchronous		Communications
=== 1991 ===
14 February 1991; 08:31:56	Proton-K/DM-2 8K82K/11S861	344-02	Site 200/39	Successful
14 February 1991; 08:31:56	Kosmos 2133 (Prognoz)	Geosynchronous		Missile defence
28 February 1991; 05:30:00	Proton-K/DM-2 8K82K/11S861	360-02	Site 81/23	Successful
28 February 1991; 05:30:00	Gran' #38L (Raduga)	Geosynchronous		Communications
31 March 1991; 15:12:00	Proton-K 8K82K	365-01	Site 200/40	Successful
31 March 1991; 15:12:00	Almaz 1 (Mech-KU #305)	Low Earth		Radar imaging
4 April 1991; 10:47:12	Proton-K/DM-2 8K82K/11S861	354-02	Site 200/39	Successful
4 April 1991; 10:47:12	Kosmos 2139 (Uragan #50L)	Medium Earth		Navigation
4 April 1991; 10:47:12	Kosmos 2140 (Uragan #53L)	Medium Earth		Navigation
4 April 1991; 10:47:12	Kosmos 2141 (Uragan #54L)	Medium Earth		Navigation
1 July 1991; 21:53:00	Proton-K/DM-2 8K82K/11S861	373-01	Site 200/39	Successful
1 July 1991; 21:53:00	Gorizont #34L	Geosynchronous		Communications
13 September 1991; 17:51:02	Proton-K/DM-2 8K82K/11S861	353-01	Site 81/23	Successful
13 September 1991; 17:51:02	Kosmos 2155 (Prognoz)	Geosynchronous		Missile defence
23 October 1991; 15:24:59	Proton-K/DM-2 8K82K/11S861	362-02	Site 200/39	Successful
23 October 1991; 15:24:59	Gorizont #35L	Geosynchronous		Communications
22 November 1991; 13:27:00	Proton-K/DM-2 8K82K/11S861	353-02	Site 81/23	Successful
22 November 1991; 13:27:00	Kosmos 2172 (Geizer #18L)	Geosynchronous		Communications
19 December 1991; 11:41:00	Proton-K/DM-2 8K82K/11S861	355-01	Site 81/23	Successful
19 December 1991; 11:41:00	Gran' #39L (Raduga)	Geosynchronous		Communications
=== 1992 ===
29 January 1992; 22:19:12	Proton-K/DM-2 8K82K/11S861	372-02	Site 81/23	Successful
29 January 1992; 22:19:12	Kosmos 2177 (Uragan #68L)	Medium Earth	VKS	Navigation
29 January 1992; 22:19:12	Kosmos 2178 (Uragan #69L)	Medium Earth	VKS	Navigation
29 January 1992; 22:19:12	Kosmos 2179 (Uragan #71L)	Medium Earth	VKS	Navigation
2 April 1992; 01:50:00	Proton-K/DM-2 8K82K/11S861	369-01	Site 81/23	Successful
2 April 1992; 01:50:00	Gorizont #36L	Geosynchronous	Informkosmos	Communications
14 July 1992; 22:02:00	Proton-K/DM-2 8K82K/11S861	371-02	Site 81/23	Successful
14 July 1992; 22:02:00	Gorizont #37L	Geosynchronous	Informkosmos	Communications
30 July 1992; 01:59:01	Proton-K/DM-2 8K82K/11S861	376-01	Site 81/23	Successful
30 July 1992; 01:59:01	Kosmos 2204 (Uragan #56L)	Medium Earth	VKS	Navigation
30 July 1992; 01:59:01	Kosmos 2205 (Uragan #72L)	Medium Earth	VKS	Navigation
30 July 1992; 01:59:01	Kosmos 2206 (Uragan #74L)	Medium Earth	VKS	Navigation
10 September 1992; 18:01:18	Proton-K/DM-2 8K82K/11S861	363-01	Site 81/23	Successful
10 September 1992; 18:01:18	Kosmos 2209 (Prognoz)	Geosynchronous	VKS	Missile defence
30 October 1992; 14:59:00	Proton-K/DM-2 8K82K/11S861	372-01	Site 81/23	Successful
30 October 1992; 14:59:00	Ekran-M #15L	Geosynchronous	Informkosmos	Communications
27 November 1992; 13:09:59	Proton-K/DM-2 8K82K/11S861	364-01	Site 81/23	Successful
27 November 1992; 13:09:59	Gorizont #38L	Geosynchronous	Informkosmos	Communications
17 December 1992; 12:45:00	Proton-K/DM-2 8K82K/11S861	357-02	Site 200/39	Successful
17 December 1992; 12:45:00	Kosmos 2224 (Prognoz)	Geosynchronous	VKS	Missile defence
=== 1993 ===
17 February 1993; 20:09:47	Proton-K/DM-2 8K82K/11S861	362-01	Site 81/23	Successful
17 February 1993; 20:09:47	Kosmos 2234 (Uragan #73L)	Medium Earth	VKS	Navigation
17 February 1993; 20:09:47	Kosmos 2235 (Uragan #59L)	Medium Earth	VKS	Navigation
17 February 1993; 20:09:47	Kosmos 2236 (Uragan #57L)	Medium Earth	VKS	Navigation
25 March 1993; 02:28:00	Proton-K/DM-2 8K82K/11S861	358-01	Site 81/23	Successful
25 March 1993; 02:28:00	Gran' #42L (Raduga)	Geosynchronous		Communications
27 May 1993; 01:22:00	Proton-K/DM-2 8K82K/11S861	364-02	Site 81/23	Failure
27 May 1993; 01:22:00	Gorizont #39L	Geosynchronous	Informkosmos	Communications (intended)
27 May 1993; 01:22:00	Second stage underperformed due to contaminated propellant			
30 September 1993; 17:05:59	Proton-K/DM-2 8K82K/11S861	359-01	Site 81/23	Successful
30 September 1993; 17:05:59	Gran' #41L (Raduga)	Geosynchronous		Communications
28 October 1993; 15:17:00	Proton-K/DM-2 8K82K/11S861	368-01	Site 81/23	Successful
28 October 1993; 15:17:00	Gorizont #40L	Geosynchronous	Informkosmos	Communications
18 November 1993; 13:54:58	Proton-K/DM-2 8K82K/11S861	367-01	Site 81/23	Successful
18 November 1993; 13:54:58	Rimsat 1	Geosynchronous	Rimsat	Communications
=== 1994 ===
20 January 1994; 09:49:00	Proton-K/DM-2M 8K82K/11S861-01	358-02	Site 81/23	Successful
20 January 1994; 09:49:00	Gals 1	Geosynchronous		Communications
20 January 1994; 09:49:00	First Proton-K launch with Block DM-2M upper stage			
5 February 1994; 08:46:00	Proton-K/DM-2 8K82K/11S861	375-02	Site 81/23	Successful
5 February 1994; 08:46:00	Globus #13 (Raduga-1)	Geosynchronous		Communications
18 February 1994; 07:56:00	Proton-K/DM-2 8K82K/11S861	376-02	Site 81/23	Successful
18 February 1994; 07:56:00	Gran' #40L (Raduga)	Geosynchronous		Communications
11 April 1994; 07:49:22	Proton-K/DM-2 8K82K/11S861	377-01	Site 81/23	Successful
11 April 1994; 07:49:22	Kosmos 2275 (Uragan #58L)	Medium Earth	VKS	Navigation
11 April 1994; 07:49:22	Kosmos 2276 (Uragan #60L)	Medium Earth	VKS	Navigation
11 April 1994; 07:49:22	Kosmos 2277 (Uragan #61L)	Medium Earth	VKS	Navigation
20 May 1994; 02:01:00	Proton-K/DM-2 8K82K/11S861	357-01	Site 81/23	Successful
20 May 1994; 02:01:00	Rimsat 2	Geosynchronous	Rimsat	Communications
6 July 1994; 23:58:51	Proton-K/DM-2 8K82K/11S861	365-02	Site 81/23	Successful
6 July 1994; 23:58:51	Kosmos 2282 (Prognoz)	Geosynchronous	VKS	Missile defence
11 August 1994; 15:27:46	Proton-K/DM-2 8K82K/11S861	367-02	Site 81/23	Successful
11 August 1994; 15:27:46	Kosmos 2287 (Uragan #67L)	Medium Earth	VKS	Navigation
11 August 1994; 15:27:46	Kosmos 2288 (Uragan #70L)	Medium Earth	VKS	Navigation
11 August 1994; 15:27:46	Kosmos 2289 (Uragan #75L)	Medium Earth	VKS	Navigation
21 September 1994; 17:53:00	Proton-K/DM-2 8K82K/11S861	381-02	Site 200/39	Successful
21 September 1994; 17:53:00	Kosmos 2291 (Geizer #19L)	Geosynchronous	VKS	Communications
13 October 1994; 16:19:00	Proton-K/DM-2M 8K82K/11S861-01	377-02	Site 200/39	Successful
13 October 1994; 16:19:00	Ekspress #11L	Geosynchronous	Informkosmos	Communications
31 October 1994; 14:30:56	Proton-K/DM-2 8K82K/11S861	361-02	Site 81/23	Successful
31 October 1994; 14:30:56	Elektro #1L	Geosynchronous		Weather
20 November 1994; 00:39:37	Proton-K/DM-2 8K82K/11S861	371-01	Site 200/39	Successful
20 November 1994; 00:39:37	Kosmos 2294 (Uragan #62L)	Medium Earth	VKS	Navigation
20 November 1994; 00:39:37	Kosmos 2295 (Uragan #63L)	Medium Earth	VKS	Navigation
20 November 1994; 00:39:37	Kosmos 2296 (Uragan #64L)	Medium Earth	VKS	Navigation
16 December 1994; 12:00:00	Proton-K/DM-2 8K82K/11S861	373-02	Site 81/23	Successful
16 December 1994; 12:00:00	Altair #13L (Luch)	Geosynchronous	Rosaviakosmos	Communications
28 December 1994; 11:31:00	Proton-K/DM-2 8K82K/11S861	366-01	Site 81/23	Successful
28 December 1994; 11:31:00	Gran' #43L (Raduga)	Geosynchronous		Communications
=== 1995 ===
7 March 1995; 09:23:44	Proton-K/DM-2 8K82K/11S861	370-02	Site 200/39	Successful
7 March 1995; 09:23:44	Kosmos 2307 (Uragan #65L)	Medium Earth	VKS	Navigation
7 March 1995; 09:23:44	Kosmos 2308 (Uragan #66L)	Medium Earth	VKS	Navigation
7 March 1995; 09:23:44	Kosmos 2309 (Uragan #67L)	Medium Earth	VKS	Navigation
20 May 1995; 03:33:22	Proton-K 8K82K	378-02	Site 81/23	Successful
20 May 1995; 03:33:22	Spektr	Low Earth	Rosaviakosmos/NASA	Space Station module
20 May 1995; 03:33:22	Fifth module of Mir			
24 July 1995; 15:52:10	Proton-K/DM-2 8K82K/11S861	374-01	Site 200/39	Successful
24 July 1995; 15:52:10	Kosmos 2316 (Uragan #80L)	Medium Earth	VKS	Navigation
24 July 1995; 15:52:10	Kosmos 2317 (Uragan #81L)	Medium Earth	VKS	Navigation
24 July 1995; 15:52:10	Kosmos 2318 (Uragan #85L)	Medium Earth	VKS	Navigation
30 August 1995; 19:33:00	Proton-K/DM-2 8K82K/11S861	369-02	Site 200/39	Successful
30 August 1995; 19:33:00	Kosmos 2319 (Geizer #20L)	Geosynchronous	VKS	Communications
11 October 1995; 16:26:00	Proton-K/DM-2 8K82K/11S861	386-01	Site 81/23	Successful
11 October 1995; 16:26:00	Luch 1 (Gelios)	Geosynchronous	Rosaviakosmos	Communications
17 November 1995; 14:25:00	Proton-K/DM-2 8K82K/11S861	384-01	Site 200/39	Successful
17 November 1995; 14:25:00	Gals 2	Geosynchronous		Communications
14 December 1995; 06:10:31	Proton-K/DM-2 8K82K/11S861	378-01	Site 200/39	Successful
14 December 1995; 06:10:31	Kosmos 2323 (Uragan #82L)	Medium Earth	VKS	Navigation
14 December 1995; 06:10:31	Kosmos 2324 (Uragan #78L)	Medium Earth	VKS	Navigation
14 December 1995; 06:10:31	Kosmos 2325 (Uragan #76L)	Medium Earth	VKS	Navigation
=== 1996 ===
25 January 1996; 09:56:00	Proton-K/DM-2 8K82K/11S861	374-02	Site 200/39	Successful
25 January 1996; 09:56:00	Gorizont #43L	Geosynchronous	Informkosmos	Communications
19 February 1996; 08:19:00	Proton-K/DM-2 8K82K/11S861	383-02	Site 200/39	Failure
19 February 1996; 08:19:00	Gran' #44L (Raduga)	Geosynchronous (intended); Geosynchronous transfer (achieved)		Communications
19 February 1996; 08:19:00	Upper stage failed to restart			
8 April 1996; 23:09:01	Proton-K/DM3 8K82K/11S861-01	390-01	Site 81/23	Successful
8 April 1996; 23:09:01	Astra 1F	Geosynchronous transfer	SES	Communications
8 April 1996; 23:09:01	First commercial launch conducted by International Launch Services, first launch of Proton-K with Block DM3 upper stage			
23 April 1996; 11:48:50	Proton-K 8K82K	385-01	Site 81/23	Successful
23 April 1996; 11:48:50	Priroda	Low Earth	Rosaviakosmos	Space Station module
23 April 1996; 11:48:50	Seventh module of Mir			
25 May 1996; 02:04:59	Proton-K/DM-2 8K82K/11S861	379-01	Site 200/39	Successful
25 May 1996; 02:04:59	Gorizont #44L	Geosynchronous	Informkosmos	Communications
6 September 1996; 17:37:38	Proton-K/DM1 8K82K/11S861	375-01	Site 81/23	Successful
6 September 1996; 17:37:38	Inmarsat-3 F2	Geosynchronous	Inmarsat	Communications
6 September 1996; 17:37:38	Commercial launch conducted by International Launch Services, only flight of Proton-K with Block DM1 upper stage			
26 September 1996; 17:50:53	Proton-K/DM-2M 8K82K/11S861-01	379-02	Site 200/39	Successful
26 September 1996; 17:50:53	Ekspress #12L	Geosynchronous	Informkosmos	Communications
16 November 1996; 20:48:52	Proton-K/D-2 8K82K/11S824F	392-02	Site 200/39	Failure
16 November 1996; 20:48:52	Mars 96 (Fobos-M1 #520)	Heliocentric (intended); Low Earth (achieved)	Rosaviakosmos	Mars probe
16 November 1996; 20:48:52	Final flight of Proton-K with Block D-2 upper stage, upper stage failed to restart, reentered atmosphere over Bolivia			
=== 1997 ===
24 May 1997; 17:00:00	Proton-K/DM4 8K82K/11S861-01	380-02	Site 81/23	Successful
24 May 1997; 17:00:00	Telstar 5	Geosynchronous transfer	Loral Skynet	Communications
24 May 1997; 17:00:00	Commercial launch conducted by International Launch Services, only flight of Proton-K with Block DM4 upper stage.			
6 June 1997; 16:56:54	Proton-K/DM-5 8K82K/17S40	380-01	Site 200/39	Successful
6 June 1997; 16:56:54	Kosmos 2344 (Araks #1)	Medium Earth	VKS	Optical reconnaissance
6 June 1997; 16:56:54	First Proton-K launch with Block DM-5 upper stage			
18 June 1997; 14:02:45	Proton-K/DM2 8K82K/17S40	390-02	Site 81/23	Successful
18 June 1997; 14:02:45	Iridium 9	Low Earth	Iridium	Communications
18 June 1997; 14:02:45	Iridium 10	Low Earth	Iridium	Communications
18 June 1997; 14:02:45	Iridium 11	Low Earth	Iridium	Communications
18 June 1997; 14:02:45	Iridium 12	Low Earth	Iridium	Communications
18 June 1997; 14:02:45	Iridium 13	Low Earth	Iridium	Communications
18 June 1997; 14:02:45	Iridium 14	Low Earth	Iridium	Communications
18 June 1997; 14:02:45	Iridium 16	Low Earth	Iridium	Communications
18 June 1997; 14:02:45	Commercial launch conducted by Khrunichev, first Proton-K launch with Block DM2 upper stage			
14 August 1997; 20:49:14	Proton-K/DM-2 8K82K/11S861	381-01	Site 200/39	Successful
14 August 1997; 20:49:14	Kosmos 2345 (Prognoz)	Geosynchronous	RVSN	Missile defence
28 August 1997; 00:33:30	Proton-K/DM3 8K82K/11S861-01	387-02	Site 81/23	Successful
28 August 1997; 00:33:30	PAS-5	Geosynchronous transfer	PanAmSat	Communications
28 August 1997; 00:33:30	Commercial launch conducted by International Launch Services			
14 September 1997; 01:36:54	Proton-K/DM2 8K82K/17S40	391-01	Site 81/23	Successful
14 September 1997; 01:36:54	Iridium 27	Low Earth	Iridium	Communications
14 September 1997; 01:36:54	Iridium 28	Low Earth	Iridium	Communications
14 September 1997; 01:36:54	Iridium 29	Low Earth	Iridium	Communications
14 September 1997; 01:36:54	Iridium 30	Low Earth	Iridium	Communications
14 September 1997; 01:36:54	Iridium 31	Low Earth	Iridium	Communications
14 September 1997; 01:36:54	Iridium 32	Low Earth	Iridium	Communications
14 September 1997; 01:36:54	Iridium 33	Low Earth	Iridium	Communications
14 September 1997; 01:36:54	Commercial launch conducted by Khrunichev			
12 November 1997; 17:00:00	Proton-K/DM-2M 8K82K/11S861-01	382-01	Site 200/39	Successful
12 November 1997; 17:00:00	Kupon	Geosynchronous	CBRF	Communications
2 December 1997; 23:10:37	Proton-K/DM3 8K82K/11S861-01	382-02	Site 81/23	Successful
2 December 1997; 23:10:37	Astra 1G	Geosynchronous transfer	SES	Communications
2 December 1997; 23:10:37	Commercial launch conducted by International Launch Services			
24 December 1997; 23:19	Proton-K/DM3 8K82K/11S861-01	394-01	Site 81/23	Partial failure
24 December 1997; 23:19	AsiaSat 3	Geosynchronous transfer	AsiaSat	Communications
24 December 1997; 23:19	Commercial launch conducted by International Launch Services, upper stage failed into second burn resulting in lower perigee than expected, spacecraft corrected its orbit at significant cost to operational life			
=== 1998 ===
7 April 1998; 02:13:03	Proton-K/DM2 8K82K/17S40	391-02	Site 81/23	Successful
7 April 1998; 02:13:03	Iridium 62	Low Earth	Iridium	Communications
7 April 1998; 02:13:03	Iridium 63	Low Earth	Iridium	Communications
7 April 1998; 02:13:03	Iridium 64	Low Earth	Iridium	Communications
7 April 1998; 02:13:03	Iridium 65	Low Earth	Iridium	Communications
7 April 1998; 02:13:03	Iridium 66	Low Earth	Iridium	Communications
7 April 1998; 02:13:03	Iridium 67	Low Earth	Iridium	Communications
7 April 1998; 02:13:03	Iridium 68	Low Earth	Iridium	Communications
7 April 1998; 02:13:03	Commercial launch conducted by Khrunichev			
29 April 1998; 04:36:54	Proton-K/DM-2 8K82K/11S861	384-02	Site 200/39	Successful
29 April 1998; 04:36:54	Kosmos 2350 (Prognoz)	Geosynchronous	RVSN	Missile defence
7 May 1998; 23:45:00	Proton-K/DM3 8K82K/11S861-01	393-02	Site 81/23	Successful
7 May 1998; 23:45:00	EchoStar IV	Geosynchronous transfer	Echostar	Communications
7 May 1998; 23:45:00	Commercial launch conducted by International Launch Services			
30 August 1998; 00:31:00	Proton-K/DM3 8K82K/11S861-01	383-01	Site 81/23	Successful
30 August 1998; 00:31:00	Astra 2A	Geosynchronous transfer	SES	Communications
30 August 1998; 00:31:00	Commercial launch conducted by International Launch Services			
4 November 1998; 05:12:00	Proton-K/DM3 8K82K/11S861-01	395-02	Site 81/23	Successful
4 November 1998; 05:12:00	PAS-8	Geosynchronous transfer	PanAmSat	Communications
4 November 1998; 05:12:00	Commercial launch conducted by International Launch Services			
20 November 1998; 06:40:00	Proton-K 8K82K	395-01	Site 81/23	Successful
20 November 1998; 06:40:00	Zarya	Low Earth	NASA	Space Station module
20 November 1998; 06:40:00	First module of the International Space Station			
30 December 1998; 18:35:46	Proton-K/DM-2 8K82K/11S861	385-02	Site 200/39	Successful
30 December 1998; 18:35:46	Kosmos 2362 (Uragan #86L)	Medium Earth	RVSN	Navigation
30 December 1998; 18:35:46	Kosmos 2363 (Uragan #84L)	Medium Earth	RVSN	Navigation
30 December 1998; 18:35:46	Kosmos 2364 (Uragan #79L)	Medium Earth	RVSN	Navigation
=== 1999 ===
15 February 1999; 05:12:00	Proton-K/DM3 8K82K/11S861-01	396-01	Site 81/23	Successful
15 February 1999; 05:12:00	Telstar 6	Geosynchronous transfer	Loral Skynet	Communications
15 February 1999; 05:12:00	Commercial launch conducted by International Launch Services			
28 February 1999; 04:00:00	Proton-K/DM-2 8K82K/11S861	387-01	Site 81/23	Successful
28 February 1999; 04:00:00	Globus #15 (Raduga-1)	Geosynchronous		Communications
21 March 1999; 00:09:30	Proton-K/DM3 8K82K/11S861-01	388-01	Site 81/23	Successful
21 March 1999; 00:09:30	AsiaSat 3S	Geosynchronous transfer	AsiaSat	Communications
21 March 1999; 00:09:30	Commercial launch conducted by International Launch Services			
20 May 1999; 22:30:00	Proton-K/DM3 8K82K/11S861-01	396-02	Site 81/23	Successful
20 May 1999; 22:30:00	Nimiq 1	Geosynchronous transfer	Telesat Canada	Communications
20 May 1999; 22:30:00	Commercial launch conducted by International Launch Services			
18 June 1999; 01:49:30	Proton-K/DM3 8K82K/11S861-01	397-02	Site 81/23	Successful
18 June 1999; 01:49:30	Astra 1H	Geosynchronous transfer	SES	Communications
18 June 1999; 01:49:30	Commercial launch conducted by International Launch Services			
5 July 1999; 13:32:00	Proton-K/Briz-M 8K82K/11S43	389-01/88501	Site 81/24	Failure
5 July 1999; 13:32:00	Gran' #45 (Raduga)	Geosynchronous		Communications
5 July 1999; 13:32:00	First Proton-K launch with Briz-M upper stage, second stage exploded			
6 September 1999; 16:36:00	Proton-K/DM-2M 8K82K/11S861-01	388-02	Site 81/23	Successful
6 September 1999; 16:36:00	Yamal-101	Geosynchronous	Gazcom	Communications
6 September 1999; 16:36:00	Yamal-102	Geosynchronous	Gazcom	Communications
26 September 1999; 22:30:00	Proton-K/DM3 8K82K/11S861-01	398-02	Site 81/23	Successful
26 September 1999; 22:30:00	LMI-1	Geosynchronous transfer	LMI	Communications
26 September 1999; 22:30:00	Commercial launch conducted by International Launch Services			
27 October 1999; 16:16:00	Proton-K/DM-2 8K82K/11S861	386-02	Site 200/39	Failure
27 October 1999; 16:16:00	Ekspress-A1	Geosynchronous (intended)	Informkosmos	Communications
27 October 1999; 16:16:00	Second stage malfunctioned			
