= Kosmos 2440 =

Russian military early warning satellite

- Mission type: Early warning
- Operator: VKS
- COSPAR ID: 2008-033A
- SATCAT no.: 33108
- Mission duration: 5–7 years (estimate); 20 months (actual)

Spacecraft properties
- Spacecraft type: US-KMO (71Kh6)
- Manufacturer: Lavochkin
- Launch mass: 2,600 kilograms (5,700 lb)

Start of mission
- Launch date: 26 June 2008, 23:59:00 UTC
- Rocket: Proton-K/DM-2
- Launch site: Baikonur 81/24

End of mission
- Deactivated: February 2010

Orbital parameters
- Reference system: Geocentric
- Regime: Geostationary
- Longitude: 80E

Instruments
- Infrared telescope with 1 metre (3 ft 3 in) aperture

Kosmos 2440 (Russian: Космос 2440 meaning Cosmos 2440) is a Russian US-KMO missile early warning satellite which was launched in 2008 as part of the Russian Space Forces' Oko programme. The satellite is designed to identify missile launches using infrared telescopes. It spent its two-year operational life at 80E giving early warning coverage of Russia, China, North Korea, the Middle East and some of Europe.

Kosmos 2440 was launched from Site 81/24 at Baikonur Cosmodrome in Kazakhstan. A Proton-K carrier rocket with a DM-2 upper stage was used to perform the launch, which took place at 23:59 UTC on 26 June 2008. The launch successfully placed the satellite into geostationary orbit. It subsequently received its Kosmos designation, and the international designator 2008-033A. The United States Space Command assigned it the Satellite Catalog Number 33108.

When the satellite was launched US-KMO satellite Kosmos 2379 was also operational although this failed late 2009/early 2010 after an 8-year life. Kosmos 2440 itself started drifting off station in February 2010 giving an operational life of less than two years.

Kosmos 2440 was replaced by Kosmos 2479 which was launched in March 2012.

== See also ==
- List of Kosmos satellites (2251–2500)
