= Kosmos 2350 =

Russian military early warning satellite

- Mission type: Early warning
- Operator: VKS
- COSPAR ID: 1998-025A
- SATCAT no.: 25315
- Mission duration: 5-7 years (estimate); 2 months (actual)

Spacecraft properties
- Spacecraft type: US-KMO (71Kh6)
- Manufacturer: Lavochkin
- Launch mass: 2,600 kilograms (5,700 lb)

Start of mission
- Launch date: 29 April 1998, 04:36:00 UTC
- Rocket: Proton-K/DM-2
- Launch site: Baikonur 200/39

End of mission
- Deactivated: 29 June 1998

Orbital parameters
- Reference system: Geocentric
- Regime: Geostationary

Instruments
- Infrared telescope with 1 metre (3 ft 3 in) aperture

Kosmos 2350 (Russian: Космос 2350 meaning Cosmos 2350) is a Russian US-KMO missile early warning satellite which was launched in 1998 as part of the Russian Space Forces' Oko programme. The satellite is designed to identify missile launches using infrared telescopes.

Kosmos 2350 was launched from Site 200/39 at Baikonur Cosmodrome in Kazakhstan. A Proton-K carrier rocket with a DM-2 upper stage was used to perform the launch, which took place at 04:36 UTC on 29 April 1998. The launch successfully placed the satellite into geostationary orbit. It subsequently received its Kosmos designation, and the international designator 1998-025A. The United States Space Command assigned it the Satellite Catalog Number 25315.

This satellite only worked for 2 months before failing.

The US National Space Science Data Center describe this as a Potok military communications satellite instead of an early warning satellite.

== See also ==
- List of Kosmos satellites (2251–2500)
