= Serpukhov-15 =

Military town in Kaluga Oblast, Russia

- Серпухов-15
- Part of Main Centre for Missile Attack Warning
- Kurilovo, Kaluga Oblast, Russia
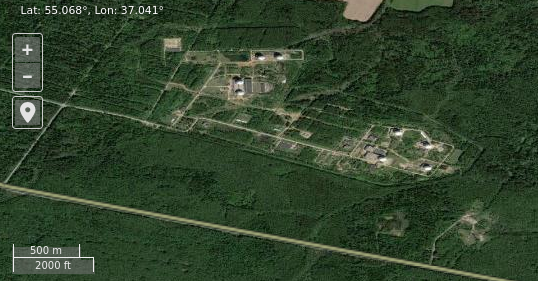
- Satellite imagery of Serpukhov-15 satellite ground station

Site information
- Type: Satellite ground station
- Condition: operational

Location
- Location within Kaluga Oblast Location within Russia Location within European Russia
- Coordinates: 55.068333°N 37.041389°E

Site history
- Built: 1982

Garrison information
- Garrison: 916th Independent Radio Technical Unit

Serpukhov-15 (Russian: Серпухов-15) is a military townlet near Kurilovo in Kaluga Oblast which is the location of the western control centre for Russia's Oko satellites. These give early warning of ballistic missile launches, mainly from the continental United States. The site is part of the Main Centre for Missile Attack Warning and information from here is processed at the Russian Aerospace Defence Forces centre in Solnechnogorsk and could be used, together with early warning radar such as the Voronezh, for launch on warning of the A-135 anti-ballistic missile system. A similar facility is located at Pivan-1 in the Russian Far East.

The name Serpukhov-15 is a code name following the practice established to name closed cities and military facilities. It is named after the nearest city, Serpukhov in Moscow Oblast which is about 35 kilometres (22 mi) away.

== Oko ==
Oko consists of two types of early warning satellites - US-K and US-KMO. The older US-K satellites are in highly elliptical molniya orbits which give them coverage of the United States at certain times during the day. For full coverage of the US missile grounds four US-K satellites need to be operational and the system can have up to nine of them in orbit at once. The US-KMO satellites are geosynchronous satellites providing continuous coverage. In total, 101 satellites have been launched.

The system was placed on combat duty in 1982. The last US-KMO satellite (Kosmos 2479) was launched on 30 March 2012 and the last US-K satellite (Kosmos 2469) on 30 September 2010. They are due to be replaced by a new system called EKS.

== Facility ==
In 1960 the site was used as one of the locations of the missiles for the S-25 Berkut (Russian: С-25 Беркут) air defence system. Later it was one of the intended bases for A350 missiles for the A-35 anti-ballistic missile system, although it was not completed.

The Oko control centre was built later and was put on combat duty in 1982. It consists of antennas and facilities for data processing. Photographs of the site show a number of buildings and seven domes, presumably containing the antennas.

As the western control centre it can communicate with geosynchronous satellites in four of the seven reserved locations, those looking over the Atlantic. The other three, looking over the Pacific, need to be controlled from the eastern centre.

Location Name	Longitude	Control Centre
Prognoz-1	24°W	Serpukhov-15
Prognoz-2	12°E	Serpukhov-15
Prognoz-3	35°E	Serpukhov-15
Prognoz-4	80°E	Serpukhov-15
Prognoz-5	130°E	Pivan-1
Prognoz-6	166°E	Pivan-1
Prognoz-7	159°W	Pivan-1

== 1983 incident ==
On 26 September 1983 the system suffered a major malfunction when it erroneously identified a launch of five Minuteman ICBMs in the United States. It appears that the system misidentified a particular set of circumstances including high clouds and the autumn equinox. Lt. Colonel Stanislav Petrov, the officer on duty at the time, discounted the reports as the system had only recently become operational and the launches were not corroborated by early-warning radar.

== 2001 fire ==
A fire broke out at the control centre on 10 May 2001 at 2:20 local time. The military tried to put the fire out itself but called the civilian fire brigade at 3:20 local time. They discovered that the fire was located in the gap between the second and third floors. 100 firefighters were involved and media reports said that the affected building was burnt out. It was reported that the centre restarted operations on 20 August 2001.

At the time of the fire there were four satellites in the constellation, all US-K in molniya orbits. The effect of the fire was that control of the satellites was lost for 12 hours. Satellites in molniya orbits need contact from the ground station every 2 or three orbits to maintain their orbital position. The fire caused the loss of four satellites - two satellites were lost immediately (Kosmos 2340 and Kosmos 2351) and two more (Kosmos 2368 and Kosmos 2342) within a year due to the negative effect on their orbits.
