= Kosmos 2224 =

Russian military early warning satellite

- Mission type: Early warning
- Operator: VKS
- COSPAR ID: 1992-088A
- SATCAT no.: 22269
- Mission duration: 5-7 years (estimate); 77 months (actual)

Spacecraft properties
- Spacecraft type: US-KMO (71Kh6)
- Manufacturer: Lavochkin
- Launch mass: 2,600 kilograms (5,700 lb)

Start of mission
- Launch date: 17 December 1992, 12:45:00 UTC
- Rocket: Proton-K/DM-2
- Launch site: Baikonur 200/39

End of mission
- Deactivated: 17 June 1999

Orbital parameters
- Reference system: Geocentric
- Regime: Geostationary

Instruments
- Infrared telescope with 1 metre (3 ft 3 in) aperture

Kosmos 2224 (Russian: Космос 2224 meaning Cosmos 2224) is a Russian US-KMO missile early warning satellite which was launched in 1992 as part of the Russian Space Forces' Oko programme. The satellite is designed to identify missile launches using infrared telescopes.

Kosmos 2224 was launched from Site 200/39 at Baikonur Cosmodrome in Kazakhstan. A Proton-K carrier rocket with a DM-2 upper stage was used to perform the launch, which took place at 12:45 UTC on 17 December 1992. The launch successfully placed the satellite into geostationary orbit. It subsequently received its Kosmos designation, and the international designator 1992-088A. The United States Space Command assigned it the Satellite Catalog Number 22269.

It was operational for 77 months, which was the longest of the US-KMO series until Kosmos 2379.

== See also ==
- List of Kosmos satellites (2001–2250)
