= Kosmos 2379 =

Russian military early warning satellite

- Mission type: Early warning
- Operator: VKS
- COSPAR ID: 2001-037A
- SATCAT no.: 26892
- Mission duration: 5–7 years (estimate); 8 years (actual)

Spacecraft properties
- Spacecraft type: US-KMO (71Kh6)
- Manufacturer: Lavochkin
- Launch mass: 2,600 kilograms (5,700 lb)

Start of mission
- Launch date: 24 August 2001, 20:39:00 UTC
- Rocket: Proton-K/DM-2
- Launch site: Baikonur 81/24

End of mission
- Deactivated: late 2009/early 2010

Orbital parameters
- Reference system: Geocentric
- Regime: Geostationary
- Longitude: 24W until September 2007 then 12E

Instruments
- Infrared telescope with 1 metre (3 ft 3 in) aperture

Kosmos 2379 (Russian: Космос 2379 meaning Cosmos 2379) is a Russian US-KMO missile early warning satellite which was launched in 2001 as part of the Russian Space Forces' Oko programme. The satellite is designed to identify missile launches using infrared telescopes.

Kosmos 2379 was launched from Site 81/24 at Baikonur Cosmodrome in Kazakhstan. A Proton-K carrier rocket with a DM-2 upper stage was used to perform the launch, which took place at 20:39 UTC on 24 August 2001. The launch successfully placed the satellite into geostationary orbit. It subsequently received its Kosmos designation, and the international designator 2001-037A. The United States Space Command assigned it the Satellite Catalog Number 26892.

This satellite was located at 24W until August/September 2007 when it moved to 12E. It had an 8-year operational life and failed late 2009/early 2010.

== See also ==
- List of Kosmos satellites (2251–2500)
