= Pivan-1 =

- Пивань-1
- Part of Main Centre for Missile Attack Warning
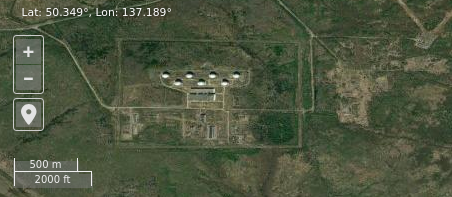
- Satellite imagery of Pivan-1 satellite ground station

Site information
- Type: Satellite ground station
- Open to the public: no
- Condition: operational

Location
- Coordinates: 50.349167°N 137.189444°E
- Height: 45m

Site history
- Built: 1981

Garrison information
- Garrison: 1127th Independent Radio Technical Unit

Pivan-1 (Russian: Пивань-1) is a military townlet near Komsomolsk-na-Amur in Khabarovsk Krai in the Russian Far East which is the location of the eastern control centre for Russia's Oko satellites. These give early warning of ballistic missile launches, mainly from the continental United States. The site is part of the Main Centre for Missile Attack Warning and information from here is processed at the Russian Aerospace Defence Forces centre in Solnechnogorsk and could be used, together with early warning radar such as the Voronezh, for launch on warning or the A-135 anti-ballistic missile system. A similar facility is located at Serpukhov-15 near Moscow.

The name Pivan-1 is a code name following the practice established to name closed cities and military facilities. It is named after the nearest settlement, Pivan.

== Oko ==
Oko consists of two types of early warning satellites - US-K and US-KMO. The older US-K satellites are in highly elliptical molniya orbits which give them coverage of the United States at certain times during the day. For full coverage of the US missile grounds four US-K satellites need to be operational and the system can have up to nine of them in orbit at once. The US-KMO satellites are geosynchronous satellites providing continuous coverage. In total, 101 satellites have been launched.

The Oko system was placed on combat duty in 1982. The last US-KMO satellite (Kosmos 2479) was launched on 30 March 2012 and the last US-K satellite (Kosmos 2469) on 30 September 2010. They are being replaced by a new system called EKS.

== Facility ==
The western Oko control centre at Serpukhov-15 was put on combat duty in 1982. The eastern one started to be built in 1982, started testing in 1991, went onto experimental combat duty in 2002 and full combat duty on 30 April 2012.

It consists of seven 25 metres (82 ft) antennas, each under a 45 metres (148 ft) high dome and weighing 300 tonnes (330 tons). There are also facilities for data processing.

As the eastern control centre it can communicate with geosynchronous satellites in four of the seven reserved locations, those looking over the Pacific. However, there had never been satellites in the three positions furthest east until Kosmos 2479 was moved to 166°E in October 2012. The others, looking over the Atlantic, need to be controlled from the western centre.

Location Name	Longitude	Control Centre
Prognoz-1	24°W	Serpukhov-15
Prognoz-2	12°E	Serpukhov-15
Prognoz-3	35°E	Serpukhov-15
Prognoz-4	80°E	Pivan-1/Serpukhov-15
Prognoz-5	130°E	Pivan-1
Prognoz-6	166°E	Pivan-1
Prognoz-7	159°W	Pivan-1
