= Kosmos 2282 =

Russian military early warning satellite

- Mission type: Early warning
- Operator: VKS
- COSPAR ID: 1994-038A
- SATCAT no.: 23168
- Mission duration: 5-7 years (estimate); 17 months (actual)

Spacecraft properties
- Spacecraft type: US-KMO (71Kh6)
- Manufacturer: Lavochkin
- Launch mass: 2,600 kilograms (5,700 lb)

Start of mission
- Launch date: 6 July 1994, 23:58:00 UTC
- Rocket: Proton-K/DM-2
- Launch site: Baikonur 81/23

End of mission
- Deactivated: 29 December 1995

Orbital parameters
- Reference system: Geocentric
- Regime: Geostationary

Instruments
- Infrared telescope with 1 metre (3 ft 3 in) aperture

Kosmos 2282 (Russian: Космос 2282 meaning Cosmos 2282) is a Russian US-KMO missile early warning satellite which was launched in 1994 as part of the Russian Space Forces' Oko programme. The satellite is designed to identify missile launches using infrared telescopes.

Kosmos 2282 was launched from Site 81/23 at Baikonur Cosmodrome in Kazakhstan. A Proton-K carrier rocket with a DM-2 upper stage was used to perform the launch, which took place at 23:58 UTC on 6 July 1994. The launch successfully placed the satellite into geostationary orbit. It subsequently received its Kosmos designation, and the international designator 1994-038A. The United States Space Command assigned it the Satellite Catalog Number 23168.

This satellite only worked for 17 months before failing.

== See also ==
- List of Kosmos satellites (2251–2500)
