= ODIN'S EYE II =

European missile early warning initiative

ODIN'S EYE (multinatiOnal Development INitiative for a Space-based missilE earlY-warning architecturE) II is a European multinational development initiative for a satellite-based early warning system for ballistic and hypersonic missiles. OHB System AG, based in Bremen (Germany), is the project's coordinator with a consortium of 43 companies from 14 European nations having started work on a simulator as of February 2024. It is part of the TWISTER (Timely Warning and Interception with Space-based TheatER Surveillance) project within the EU defense initiative for Permanent Structured Cooperation (PESCO).

== History ==
The project began in 2021 with an initial €7.5 million investment from the European Commission to study "space situational awareness and early warning capabilities". The project then shortly received an additional €90 million in 2023.

== See also ==
- EKS (satellite system)
- Space-Based Infrared System (SBIRS)
- Tongxin Jishu Shiyan
