= Kosmos 2209 =

Russian military early warning satellite

- Mission type: Early warning
- Operator: VKS
- COSPAR ID: 1992-059A
- SATCAT no.: 22112
- Mission duration: 4 years

Spacecraft properties
- Spacecraft type: US-KS (74Kh6)
- Manufacturer: Lavochkin
- Launch mass: 2,400 kilograms (5,300 lb)

Start of mission
- Launch date: 10 September 1992, 18:01:00 UTC
- Rocket: Proton-K/DM-2
- Launch site: Baikonur 81/23

End of mission
- Deactivated: 16 November 1996

Orbital parameters
- Reference system: Geocentric
- Regime: Geostationary

Instruments
- Optical telescope with 50 centimetres (20 in) aperture Infrared sensor/s Smaller telescopes

Kosmos 2209 (Russian: Космос 2209 meaning Cosmos 2209) is a Russian US-KS missile early warning satellite which was launched in 1992 as part of the Russian Space Forces' Oko programme. The satellite is designed to identify missile launches using optical telescopes and infrared sensors.

Kosmos 2209 was launched from Site 81/23 at Baikonur Cosmodrome in Kazakhstan. A Proton-K carrier rocket with a DM-2 upper stage was used to perform the launch, which took place at 18:01 UTC on 10 September 1992. The launch successfully placed the satellite into geostationary orbit. It subsequently received its Kosmos designation, and the international designator 1992-059A. The United States Space Command assigned it the Satellite Catalog Number 22112.

It was operational for about 4 years.

== See also ==
- List of Kosmos satellites (2001–2250)
