= Kosmos 775 =

Soviet military early warning satellite

- Mission type: Early warning
- Operator: VKS
- COSPAR ID: 1975-097A
- SATCAT no.: 8357
- Mission duration: failed

Spacecraft properties
- Spacecraft type: US-KS (74Kh6)
- Manufacturer: Lavochkin
- Launch mass: 2,400 kilograms (5,300 lb)

Start of mission
- Launch date: 8 October 1975, 00:30:00 UTC
- Rocket: Proton-K/DM
- Launch site: Baikonur 81/23

Orbital parameters
- Reference system: Geocentric
- Regime: Geostationary

Instruments
- Optical telescope with 50 centimetres (20 in) aperture Infrared sensor/s Smaller telescopes

Kosmos 775 (Russian: Космос 775 meaning Cosmos 775) is a Soviet US-KS missile early warning satellite which was launched in 1975 as part of the Oko programme. The satellite is designed to identify missile launches using optical telescopes and infrared sensors.

Kosmos 775 was launched from Site 81/23 at Baikonur Cosmodrome in the Kazakh SSR. A Proton-K carrier rocket with a DM upper stage was used to perform the launch, which took place at 00:30 UTC on 8 October 1975. The launch attempted to place the satellite into geostationary orbit. It subsequently received its Kosmos designation, and the international designator 1975-097A. The United States Space Command assigned it the Satellite Catalog Number 8357.

It was the first US-KS satellite and was never operational. Podvig says its orbit was never stabilised, NASA's National Space Science Data Centre says it exploded. The next launch of one of these craft was Kosmos 1546 in 1984.

== See also ==
- List of Kosmos satellites (751–1000)
