= List of R-7 launches (1995–1999) =

This is a list of launches made by the R-7 Semyorka ICBM, and its derivatives between 1995 and 1999. All launches are orbital satellite launches, unless stated otherwise.

Date and time (GMT)	Configuration	Serial number	Launch site	Result	Payload	Remarks
== 1995 ==
15 February 1995, 16:48	Soyuz-U (11A511U)		LC-1/5, Baikonur	Successful	Progress M-26	Mir Logistics
16 February 1995, 17:39	Soyuz-U (11A511U)		LC-43/4, Plesetsk	Successful	Foton-10	
14 March 1995, 06:11	Soyuz-U2 (11A511U2)		LC-1/5, Baikonur	Successful	Soyuz TM-21	Crewed orbital flight, 3 cosmonauts Docked to Mir
22 March 1995, 16:44	Soyuz-U (11A511U)		LC-43/4, Plesetsk	Successful	Kosmos 2311	
9 April 1995, 19:34	Soyuz-U (11A511U)		LC-1/5, Baikonur	Successful	Progress M-27	Mir Logistics
24 May 1995, 20:10	Molniya-M (8K78M)		LC-16/2, Plesetsk	Successful	Kosmos 2312 (Oko-76)	
28 June 1995, 18:25	Soyuz-U (11A511U)		LC-43/3, Plesetsk	Successful	Kosmos 2314 (Yantar-4K1)	
20 July 1995, 03:04	Soyuz-U (11A511U)		LC-1/5, Baikonur	Successful	Progress M-28	Mir Logistics
2 August 1995, 23:59	Molniya-M (8K78M)		LC-43/3, Plesetsk	Successful	Interbol 1	
2 August 1995, 23:59	Molniya-M (8K78M)		LC-43/3, Plesetsk	Successful	Magion 4	
9 August 1995, 02:21	Molniya-M (8K78M)		LC-43/3, Plesetsk	Successful	Molniya 3-47	
3 September 1995, 09:00	Soyuz-U2 (11A511U2)		LC-1/5, Baikonur	Successful	Soyuz TM-22	Crewed orbital flight, 3 cosmonauts Docked to Mir; Final flight of Soyuz-U2 11A511U2
26 September 1995, 11:20	Soyuz-U (11A511U)		LC-43/4, Plesetsk	Successful	Resurs F2	
29 September 1995, 04:25	Soyuz-U (11A511U)		LC-31/6, Baikonur	Successful	Kosmos 2320 (Yantar-4KS1)	
8 October 1995, 18:50	Soyuz-U (11A511U)		LC-31/6, Baikonur	Successful	Progress M-29	Mir Logistics
18 December 1995, 14:31	Soyuz-U (11A511U)		LC-1/5, Baikonur	Successful	Progress M-30	Mir Logistics
28 December 1995, 06:45	Molniya-M (8K78M)		LC-31/6, Baikonur	Successful	IRS-1C	
28 December 1995, 06:45	Molniya-M (8K78M)		LC-31/6, Baikonur	Successful	Skipper	
== 1996 ==
21 February 1996, 12:34	Soyuz-U (11A511U)		LC-1/5, Baikonur	Successful	Soyuz TM-23	Crewed orbital flight, 2 cosmonauts Docked with Mir
14 March 1996, 17:40	Soyuz-U (11A511U)		LC-43/4, Plesetsk	Successful	Kosmos 2331 (Yantar-4K1)	
5 May 1996, 07:04	Soyuz-U (11A511U)		LC-1/5, Baikonur	Successful	Progress M-31	Mir Logistics
14 May 1996, 08:55	Soyuz-U (11A511U)		LC-31/6, Baikonur	Failure	Yantar-1KFT	Payload fairing disintegrated T+53 seconds. Automatic shutdown commanded. Launch vehicle crashed downrange.
20 June 1996, 18:45	Soyuz-U (11A511U)		LC-16/2, Plesetsk	Failure	Yantar-4K1	Payload fairing disintegrated T+49 seconds. Automatic shutdown commanded. Launch vehicle crashed downrange.
31 July 1996, 20:00	Soyuz-U (11A511U)		LC-1/5, Baikonur	Successful	Progress M-32	Mir Logistics
14 August 1996, 22:20	Molniya-M (8K78M)		LC-43/3, Plesetsk	Successful	Molniya-1T	
17 August 1996, 13:18	Soyuz-U (11A511U)		LC-1/5, Baikonur	Successful	Soyuz TM-24	Crewed orbital flight, 3 cosmonauts Docked to Mir
29 August 1996, 05:22	Molniya-M (8K78M)		LC-43/3, Plesetsk	Successful	Microsat	
29 August 1996, 05:22	Molniya-M (8K78M)		LC-43/3, Plesetsk	Successful	Interbol 2	
29 August 1996, 05:22	Molniya-M (8K78M)		LC-43/3, Plesetsk	Successful	Magion 5	
24 October 1996, 11:37	Molniya-M (8K78M)		LC-43/4, Plesetsk	Successful	Molniya 3-48	
19 November 1996, 23:20	Soyuz-U (11A511U)		LC-1/5, Baikonur	Successful	Progress M-33	Mir Logistics
24 December 1996, 13:50	Soyuz-U (11A511U)		LC-43/4, Plesetsk	Successful	Bion 11	
== 1997 ==
10 February 1997, 14:09	Soyuz-U (11A511U)		LC-1/5, Baikonur	Successful	Soyuz TM-25	Crewed orbital flight, 3 cosmonauts Docked to Mir
6 April 1997, 16:04	Soyuz-U (11A511U)		LC-1/5, Baikonur	Successful	Progress M-34	Mir Logistics
9 April 1997, 08:58	Molniya-M (8K78M)		LC-16/2, Plesetsk	Successful	Kosmos 2340 (Oko)	
14 April 1997, 00:33	Molniya-M (8K78M)		LC-43/4, Plesetsk	Successful	Kosmos 2342 (Oko)	
15 May 1997, 12:10	Soyuz-U (11A511U)		LC-31/6, Baikonur	Successful	Kosmos 2343	
5 July 1997, 04:11	Soyuz-U (11A511U)		LC-1/5, Baikonur	Successful	Progress M-35	Mir Logistics
5 August 1997, 15:35	Soyuz-U (11A511U)		LC-1/5, Baikonur	Successful	Soyuz TM-26	Crewed orbital flight, 2 cosmonauts Docked to Mir
24 September 1997, 21:30	Molniya-M (8K78M)		LC-43/3, Plesetsk	Successful	Molniya-1T	
5 October 1997, 15:08	Soyuz-U (11A511U)		LC-1/5, Baikonur	Successful	Progress M-36	Mir Logistics
5 October 1997, 15:08	Soyuz-U (11A511U)		LC-1/5, Baikonur	Successful	Sputnik-40	
5 October 1997, 15:08	Soyuz-U (11A511U)		LC-1/5, Baikonur	Successful	X-Mir	
9 October 1997, 17:59	Soyuz-U (11A511U)		LC-43/3, Plesetsk	Successful	Foton 11	
9 October 1997, 17:59	Soyuz-U (11A511U)		LC-43/3, Plesetsk	Successful	Mirka	
18 November 1997, 11:14	Soyuz-U (11A511U)		LC-43/3, Plesetsk	Successful	Resurs F-1M	
15 December 1997, 15:40	Soyuz-U (11A511U)		LC-16/2, Plesetsk	Successful	Kosmos 2348 (Yantar)	
20 December 1997, 08:45	Soyuz-U (11A511U)		LC-1/5, Baikonur	Successful	Progress M-37	Mir Logistics
== 1998 ==
29 January 1998, 16:33	Soyuz-U (11A511U)		LC-1/5, Baikonur	Successful	Soyuz TM-27	Crewed orbital flight, 3 cosmonauts Docked to Mir
17 February 1998, 10:34	Soyuz-U (11A511U)		LC-31/6, Baikonur	Successful	Kosmos 2349 (Yantar)	
14 March 1998, 22:45	Soyuz-U (11A511U)		LC-1/5, Baikonur	Successful	Progress M-38	Mir Logistics
14 March 1998, 22:45	Soyuz-U (11A511U)		LC-1/5, Baikonur	Successful	VDU 2	Mir attitude control unit
7 May 1998, 08:53	Molniya-M (8K78M)		LC-16/2, Plesetsk	Successful	Kosmos 2351 (Oko)	
14 May 1998, 22:12	Soyuz-U (11A511U)		LC-1/5, Baikonur	Successful	Progress M-39	Mir Logistics
24 June 1998, 18:29	Soyuz-U (11A511U)		LC-43/3, Plesetsk	Successful	Kosmos 2358 (Yantar)	
25 June 1998, 14:00	Soyuz-U (11A511U)		LC-31/6, Baikonur	Successful	Kosmos 2359 (Yantar)	
1 July 1998, 00:48	Molniya-M (8K78M)		LC-43/3, Plesetsk	Successful	Molniya 3-49	
13 August 1998, 09:43	Soyuz-U (11A511U)		LC-1/5, Baikonur	Successful	Soyuz TM-28	Crewed orbital flight, 3 cosmonauts Docked to Mir
28 September 1998, 23:41	Molniya-M (8K78M)		LC-43/3, Plesetsk	Successful	Molniya-1T	
25 October 1998, 04:14	Soyuz-U (11A511U)		LC-1/5, Baikonur	Successful	Progress M-40	Mir Logistics
25 October 1998, 04:14	Soyuz-U (11A511U)		LC-1/5, Baikonur	Successful	Sputnik-41	
== 1999 ==
9 February 1999, 03:53	Soyuz-U/Ikar (11A511U)	ST-01	LC-1/5, Baikonur	Successful	Globalstar 36	
9 February 1999, 03:53	Soyuz-U/Ikar (11A511U)	ST-01	LC-1/5, Baikonur	Successful	Globalstar 23	
9 February 1999, 03:53	Soyuz-U/Ikar (11A511U)	ST-01	LC-1/5, Baikonur	Successful	Globalstar 38	
9 February 1999, 03:53	Soyuz-U/Ikar (11A511U)	ST-01	LC-1/5, Baikonur	Successful	Globalstar 40	
20 February 1999, 04:18	Soyuz-U (11A511U)		LC-1/5, Baikonur	Successful	Soyuz TM-29	Crewed orbital flight, 3 cosmonauts Docked to Mir
15 March 1999, 03:06	Soyuz-U/Ikar (11A511U)	ST-02	LC-1/5, Baikonur	Successful	Globalstar 22	
15 March 1999, 03:06	Soyuz-U/Ikar (11A511U)	ST-02	LC-1/5, Baikonur	Successful	Globalstar 41	
15 March 1999, 03:06	Soyuz-U/Ikar (11A511U)	ST-02	LC-1/5, Baikonur	Successful	Globalstar 46	
15 March 1999, 03:06	Soyuz-U/Ikar (11A511U)	ST-02	LC-1/5, Baikonur	Successful	Globalstar 37	
2 April 1999, 11:28	Soyuz-U (11A511U)		LC-1/5, Baikonur	Successful	Progress M-41	Mir Logistics
2 April 1999, 11:28	Soyuz-U (11A511U)		LC-1/5, Baikonur	Successful	Sputnik 99	
15 April 1999, 00:46	Soyuz-U/Ikar (11A511U)	ST-03	LC-1/5, Baikonur	Successful	Globalstar 19	
15 April 1999, 00:46	Soyuz-U/Ikar (11A511U)	ST-03	LC-1/5, Baikonur	Successful	Globalstar 42	
15 April 1999, 00:46	Soyuz-U/Ikar (11A511U)	ST-03	LC-1/5, Baikonur	Successful	Globalstar 44	
15 April 1999, 00:46	Soyuz-U/Ikar (11A511U)	ST-03	LC-1/5, Baikonur	Successful	Globalstar 45	
8 July 1999, 08:45	Molniya-M (8K78M)		LC-43/3, Plesetsk	Successful	Molniya 3-50	
16 July 1999, 16:39	Soyuz-U (11A511U)		LC-1/5, Baikonur	Successful	Progress M-42	Mir Logistics
18 August 1999, 18:00	Soyuz-U (11A511U)		LC-43/3, Plesetsk	Successful	Kosmos 2365 (Yantar-4K1)	
9 September 1999, 18:00	Soyuz-U (11A511U)		LC-43/4, Plesetsk	Successful	Foton 12	
22 September 1999, 14:33	Soyuz-U/Ikar (11A511U)	ST-04	LC-1/5, Baikonur	Successful	Globalstar 33	
22 September 1999, 14:33	Soyuz-U/Ikar (11A511U)	ST-04	LC-1/5, Baikonur	Successful	Globalstar 50	
22 September 1999, 14:33	Soyuz-U/Ikar (11A511U)	ST-04	LC-1/5, Baikonur	Successful	Globalstar 55	
22 September 1999, 14:33	Soyuz-U/Ikar (11A511U)	ST-04	LC-1/5, Baikonur	Successful	Globalstar 58	
28 September 1999, 11:00	Soyuz-U (11A511U)		LC-43/4, Plesetsk	Successful	Resurs F-1M	
18 October 1999, 13:22	Soyuz-U/Ikar (11A511U)	ST-05	LC-1/5, Baikonur	Successful	Globalstar 31	
18 October 1999, 13:22	Soyuz-U/Ikar (11A511U)	ST-05	LC-1/5, Baikonur	Successful	Globalstar 56	
18 October 1999, 13:22	Soyuz-U/Ikar (11A511U)	ST-05	LC-1/5, Baikonur	Successful	Globalstar 57	
18 October 1999, 13:22	Soyuz-U/Ikar (11A511U)	ST-05	LC-1/5, Baikonur	Successful	Globalstar 59	
22 November 1999, 16:20	Soyuz-U/Ikar (11A511U)	ST-06	LC-1/5, Baikonur	Successful	Globalstar 29	
22 November 1999, 16:20	Soyuz-U/Ikar (11A511U)	ST-06	LC-1/5, Baikonur	Successful	Globalstar 34	
22 November 1999, 16:20	Soyuz-U/Ikar (11A511U)	ST-06	LC-1/5, Baikonur	Successful	Globalstar 39	
22 November 1999, 16:20	Soyuz-U/Ikar (11A511U)	ST-06	LC-1/5, Baikonur	Successful	Globalstar 61	
27 December 1999, 19:12	Molniya-M (8K78M)		LC-16/2, Plesetsk	Successful	Kosmos 2367 (Oko)	
