= Kosmos 2312 =

Russian military early warning satellite

- Mission type: Early warning
- COSPAR ID: 1995-026A
- SATCAT no.: 23584
- Mission duration: 4 years

Spacecraft properties
- Spacecraft type: US-K
- Launch mass: 1,900 kilograms (4,200 lb)

Start of mission
- Launch date: 24 May 1995, 20:10 UTC
- Rocket: Molniya-M/2BL
- Launch site: Plesetsk Cosmodrome

Orbital parameters
- Reference system: Geocentric
- Regime: Molniya
- Perigee altitude: 653 kilometres (406 mi)
- Apogee altitude: 39,708 kilometres (24,673 mi)
- Inclination: 62.9 degrees
- Period: 717.90 minutes

Kosmos 2312 (Russian: Космос 2312 meaning Cosmos 2312) is a Russian US-K missile early warning satellite which was launched in 1995 as part of the Russian Space Forces' Oko programme. The satellite is designed to identify missile launches using optical telescopes and infrared sensors.

Kosmos 2312 was launched from Site 16/2 at Plesetsk Cosmodrome in Russia. A Molniya-M carrier rocket with a 2BL upper stage was used to perform the launch, which took place at 20:10 UTC on 24 May 1995. The launch successfully placed the satellite into a molniya orbit. It subsequently received its Kosmos designation, and the international designator 1995-026A. The United States Space Command assigned it the Satellite Catalog Number 23584.

== See also ==
- List of Kosmos satellites (2251–2500)
- List of R-7 launches (1995–1999)
- 1995 in spaceflight
- List of Oko satellites
