= Ikar =

Ikar can refer to:

- Ikar (airline), a Russian leisure airline formerly branded Pegas Fly
- Ikar (rocket stage), used as the upper stage for Soyuz-Ikar
- IKAR, a post-denominational Jewish congregation and community
