= Kosmos 2133 =

Russian satellite

- Mission type: Early warning
- Operator: VKS
- COSPAR ID: 1991-010A
- SATCAT no.: 21111
- Mission duration: 5-7 years (estimate); 4 years (actual)

Spacecraft properties
- Spacecraft type: US-KMO (71Kh6)
- Manufacturer: Lavochkin
- Launch mass: 2,600 kilograms (5,700 lb)

Start of mission
- Launch date: 14 February 1991, 08:31:00 UTC
- Rocket: Proton-K/DM-2
- Launch site: Baikonur 200/39

End of mission
- Deactivated: 9 November 1995

Orbital parameters
- Reference system: Geocentric
- Regime: Geostationary

Instruments
- Infrared telescope with 1 metre (3 ft 3 in) aperture

Kosmos 2133 (Russian: Космос 2133 meaning Cosmos 2133) is a Russian US-KMO missile early warning satellite which was launched in 1991 as part of the Russian Space Forces' Oko programme. The satellite is designed to identify missile launches using infrared telescopes.

Kosmos 2133 was launched from Site 200/39 at Baikonur Cosmodrome in Kazakhstan. A Proton-K carrier rocket with a DM-2 upper stage was used to perform the launch, which took place at 08:31 UTC on 14 February 1991. The launch successfully placed the satellite into geostationary orbit. It subsequently received its Kosmos designation, and the international designator 1991-010A. The United States Space Command assigned it the Satellite Catalog Number 21111.

Kosmos 2133 was the first satellite in the US-KMO series and was operational for over 4 years.

== See also ==
- List of Kosmos satellites (2001–2250)
