= Kosmos 2351 =

Russian military early warning satellite

- Mission type: Early warning
- COSPAR ID: 1998-027A
- SATCAT no.: 25327
- Mission duration: 4 years

Spacecraft properties
- Spacecraft type: US-K
- Launch mass: 1,900 kilograms (4,200 lb)

Start of mission
- Launch date: 7 May 1998, 08:53 UTC
- Rocket: Molniya-M/2BL
- Launch site: Plesetsk Cosmodrome

End of mission
- Deactivated: 2001

Orbital parameters
- Reference system: Geocentric
- Regime: Molniya
- Perigee altitude: 543 kilometres (337 mi)
- Apogee altitude: 39,812 kilometres (24,738 mi)
- Inclination: 62.9 degrees
- Period: 717.80 minutes

Kosmos 2351 (Russian: Космос 2351 meaning Cosmos 2351) was a Russian US-K missile early warning satellite which was launched in 1998 as part of the Russian Space Forces' Oko programme. The satellite was designed to identify missile launches using optical telescopes and infrared sensors.

Kosmos 2351 was launched from Site 16/2 at Plesetsk Cosmodrome in Russia. A Molniya-M carrier rocket with a 2BL upper stage was used to perform the launch, which took place at 08:53 UTC on 7 May 1998. The launch successfully placed the satellite into a molniya orbit. It subsequently received its Kosmos designation, and the international designator 1998-027A. The United States Space Command assigned it the Satellite Catalog Number 25327. The satellite (along with Kosmos 2340, Kosmos 2368, and Kosmos 2342) were lost after a 2001 fire destroyed the ground control building located at the Serpukhov-15 military base resulting in the loss of orbital control.

== See also ==
- List of Kosmos satellites (2251–2500)
- List of R-7 launches (1995–1999)
- 1999 in spaceflight
- List of Oko satellites
