= Kosmos 2345 =

Russian military early warning satellite

- Mission type: Early warning
- Operator: VKS
- COSPAR ID: 1997-041A
- SATCAT no.: 24894
- Mission duration: 18 months

Spacecraft properties
- Spacecraft type: US-KS (74Kh6)
- Manufacturer: Lavochkin
- Launch mass: 2,400 kilograms (5,300 lb)

Start of mission
- Launch date: 14 August 1997, 20:49:00 UTC
- Rocket: Proton-K/DM-2
- Launch site: Baikonur 200/39

End of mission
- Deactivated: 28 February 1999

Orbital parameters
- Reference system: Geocentric
- Regime: Geostationary

Instruments
- Optical telescope with 50 centimetres (20 in) aperture Infrared sensor/s Smaller telescopes

Kosmos 2345 (Russian: Космос 2345 meaning Cosmos 2345) is a Russian US-KS missile early warning satellite which was launched in 1997 as part of the Russian Space Forces' Oko programme. The satellite is designed to identify missile launches using optical telescopes and infrared sensors.

Kosmos 2345 was launched from Site 200/39 at Baikonur Cosmodrome in Kazakhstan. A Proton-K carrier rocket with a DM-2 upper stage was used to perform the launch, which took place at 20:49 UTC on 14 August 1997. The launch successfully placed the satellite into geostationary orbit. It subsequently received its Kosmos designation, and the international designator 1997-041A. The United States Space Command assigned it the Satellite Catalog Number 24894.

It was the last US-KS satellite and was operational for about 18 months.

== See also ==
- List of Kosmos satellites (2251–2500)
