= Kosmos 2479 =

Russian early warning satellite

- Mission type: Early warning
- Operator: VKO
- COSPAR ID: 2012-012A
- SATCAT no.: 38101
- Mission duration: 5–7 years

Spacecraft properties
- Spacecraft type: US-KMO (71Kh6)
- Manufacturer: Lavochkin
- Launch mass: 2,600 kilograms (5,700 lb)

Start of mission
- Launch date: 30 March 2012, 05:49 UTC
- Rocket: Proton-K/DM-2
- Launch site: Baikonur 81/24

Orbital parameters
- Reference system: Geocentric
- Regime: Geostationary
- Longitude: 80°E then 166°E
- Perigee altitude: 35,785 kilometres (22,236 mi)
- Apogee altitude: 35,797 kilometres (22,243 mi)
- Inclination: 1.12 degrees
- Period: 23.93 hours
- Epoch: 8 November 2013, 11:25:58 UTC

Instruments
- Infrared telescope with 1 metre (3 ft 3 in) aperture

Kosmos 2479 (Russian: Космос 2479 meaning Cosmos 2479) is a Russian US-KMO missile early warning satellite which was launched in 2012 as part of the Russian Aerospace Defence Forces' Oko programme. The satellite is designed to identify missile launches using infrared telescopes. It was the last US-KMO geostationary satellite, to be launched, prior to the system being replaced by EKS.

Kosmos 2479 was launched from Site 81/24 at Baikonur Cosmodrome in Kazakhstan. The last Proton-K carrier rocket with a DM-2 upper stage was used to perform the launch, which took place at 05:49 UTC on 30 March 2012. The launch successfully placed the satellite into geostationary orbit. It subsequently received its Kosmos designation, and the international designator 2012-012A. The United States Space Command assigned it the Satellite Catalog Number 38101.

Kosmos 2479 replaced Kosmos 2440 which was launched in June 2008 and operated until February 2010. These satellites are moved to 80°E and then moved to their intended position. It arrived at 80°E in mid-April 2012 and featured in the official opening of the Oko eastern control centre at Pivan-1 in May. It started to drift from 80°E in July 2012 and in October 2012 it was stabilised at 166°E, a location registered as Prognoz-6 but which had previously never been used.

== See also ==
- List of Kosmos satellites (2251–2500)
