= Tasimeter =

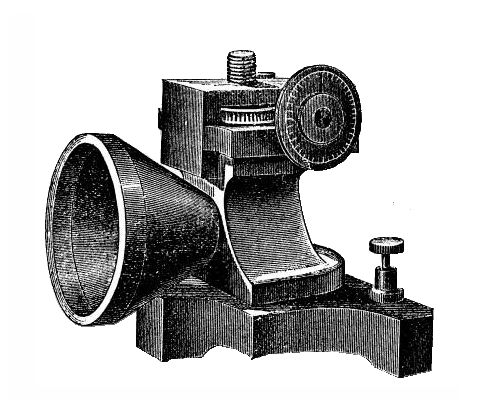
Tasimeter

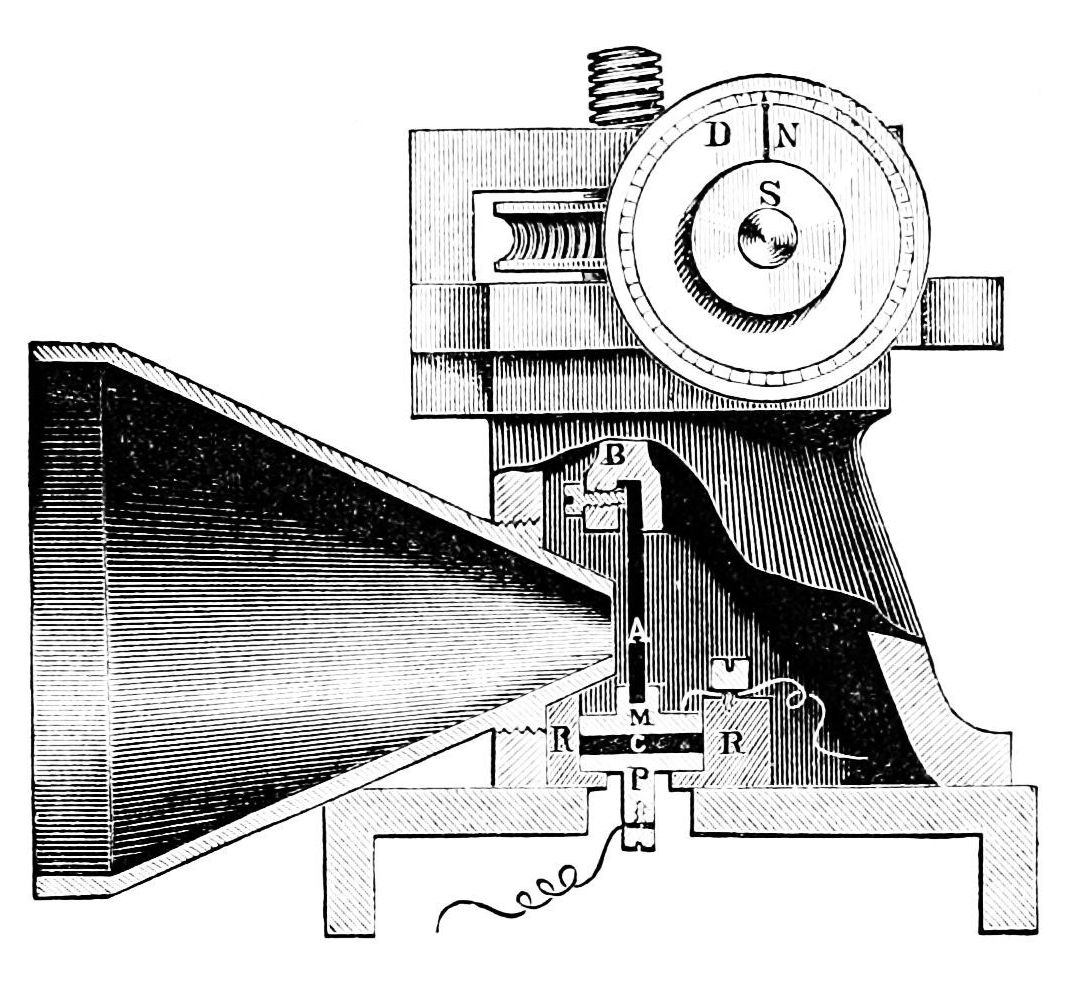
Tasimeter (partial cross section)

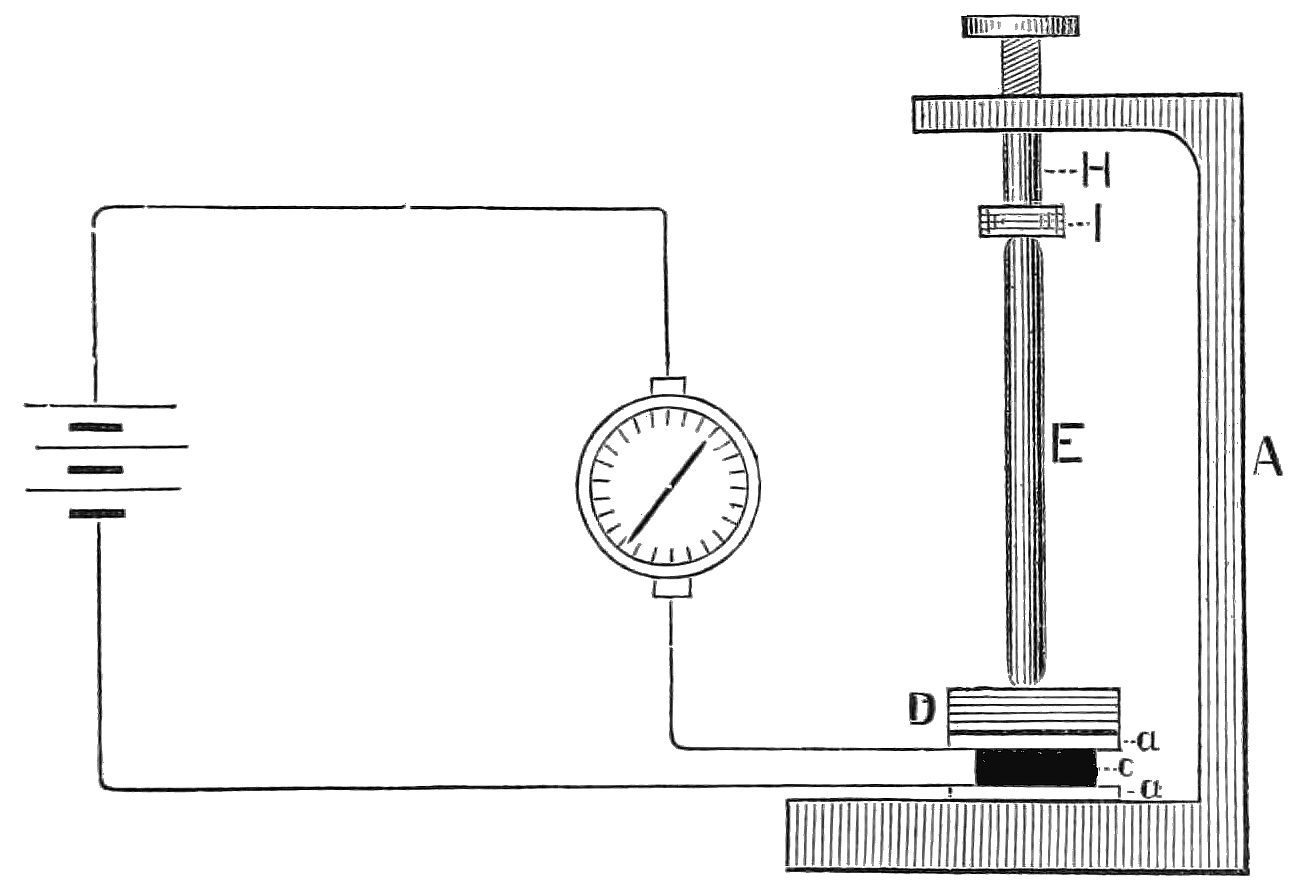
Tasimeter electrical circuit for measuring carbon sensitivity

The tasimeter, or microtasimeter, or measurer of infinitesimal pressure, is a device designed by Thomas Edison to measure infrared radiation. In 1878, Samuel Langley, Henry Draper, and other American scientists needed a highly sensitive instrument that could be used to measure minute temperature changes in heat emitted from the Sun's corona during the July 29 solar eclipse, due to occur along the Rocky Mountains. To satisfy those needs Edison devised a microtasimeter employing a carbon button.

== Description of operation ==
The value of the instrument lies in its ability to detect small variations of temperature. This is accomplished indirectly. The change of temperature causes expansion or contraction of a rod of vulcanite, which changes the resistance of an electric circuit by varying the pressure it exerts upon a carbon-button included in the circuit. During the total eclipse of the sun in 1878, it successfully demonstrated the existence of heat in the corona. It is also of service in ascertaining the relative expansion of substances due to a rise of temperature.

The functional parts are represented in the partial cross section, which shows its construction and mode of operation. The substance whose expansion is to be measured is shown at A. It is firmly clamped at B, its lower end fitting into a slot in the metal plate, M, which rests upon the carbon-button. The latter is in an electric circuit, which includes also a delicate galvanometer. Any variation in the length of the rod changes the pressure upon the carbon, and alters the resistance of the circuit. This causes a deflection of the galvanometer-needle—a movement in one direction denoting expansion of A, while an opposite motion signifies contraction. To avoid any deflection which might arise from change in strength of battery, the tasimeter is inserted in an arm of a Wheatstone bridge.

In order to ascertain the exact amount of expansion in decimals of an inch, the screw S, seen in front of the dial, is turned until the deflection previously caused by the change of temperature is reproduced. The screw works a second screw, causing the rod to ascend or descend, and the exact distance through which the rod moves is indicated by the needle, N, on the dial.

The instrument can also be advantageously used to measure changes in the humidity of the atmosphere. In this case the strip of vulcanite is replaced by one of gelatin, which changes its volume by absorbing moisture.

== Other uses ==
1878 was a time when great advances were being made in electric arc lighting, and during the solar eclipse expedition, which Edison accompanied, the men discussed the practicality of subdividing the intense arc lights so that electricity could be used for lighting in the same fashion as with small, individual gas burners. The basic problem seemed to be to keep the burner, or bulb, from being consumed by preventing it from overheating. Edison thought he would be able to solve this by fashioning a microtasimeter-like device to control the current. He announced that he would invent a safe, mild, and inexpensive electric light that would replace the gaslight.

== Abandonment ==
Edison declined to patent the device, saying it was only of interest to scientists, and allowed companies in London and Philadelphia to manufacture tasimeters royalty-free. The scientists who tested it found it too erratic to be of use for quantitative measurement purposes, and it was soon abandoned.

== See also ==
- Bolometer
- Infrared telescope
