= US-KS =

Russian and Soviet early warning satellites

- Manufacturer: NPO Lavochkin
- Country of origin: Soviet Union; Russia
- Operator: VKS
- Applications: Missile defence

Specifications
- Bus: Upravlyaemy Sputnik
- Launch mass: 2,400 kilograms (5,300 lb)
- Regime: Geosynchronous

Production
- Status: Retired
- Launched: 7
- Operational: 0
- Retired: 7
- Failed: None known
- Lost: 0
- Maiden launch: Kosmos 775; 8 October 1975
- Last launch: Kosmos 2345; 14 August 1997

Related spacecraft
- Derived from: US-K
- Derivatives: US-KMO

Upravlyaemy Sputnik Kontinentalny Statsionarny (US-KS; Russian: Управляемый Спутник Континентальный Стационарный meaning Stationary Continental Controllable Satellite; Russian: УС-КС), also known as Oko-S, was a series of Soviet, and later Russian, missile detection satellites launched as part of the Oko (Russian: "eye") programme.

== History ==
US-KS was a derivative of the US-K satellite, optimised for operations in geosynchronous orbit. Seven were launched between 1975 and 1997, when launches ended in favour of the modernised US-KMO. US-KS had the GRAU index 74Kh6. As of December 2015, the entire Oko programme is being replaced by the new EKS system.

Manufactured by NPO Lavochkin, US-KS satellites had a launch mass of 2,400 kilograms (5,300 lb), and a dry mass of 1,250 kilograms (2,760 lb). Built on a three-axis stabilised cylindrical bus with a diameter of 1.7 metres (5 ft 7 in) and a length of 2 metres (6 ft 7 in), the satellites carry 50 centimetres (20 in) infrared telescopes to detect the heat of missile exhausts.

US-KS satellites were launched by Proton-K carrier rockets, with Blok DM and DM-2 upper stages. The first satellite to be launched was a prototype, which was followed by six operational spacecraft. With a spacecraft positioned at a longitude of 24° West, the Soviet Union could continuously monitor missile launches from the United States.
