= EKS (satellite system) =

Russian early warning satellites

EKS Kupol
- Manufacturer: RKK Energia (bus) and TsNII Kometa (payload)
- Country of origin: Russia
- Operator: Kosmicheskie Voyska Rossii (Cosmic Forces, Russia)
- Applications: Early warning of missile attack

Specifications
- Bus: Possibly USP (Victoria)
- Power: Deployable solar arrays
- Batteries: Yes
- Equipment: Military early warning system and a reported secure emergency communications payload to be used in case of a nuclear war.
- Regime: Molniya

Production
- Status: Active
- On order: 3
- Launched: 6
- Operational: 6
- Retired: 0
- Maiden launch: EKS 1 / Tundra-11L, 17 November 2015
- Last launch: EKS 6 / Tundra-16L, 25 November 2022

EKS (Russian: Единая космическая система, romanized: Edinaya Kosmicheskaya Sistema meaning Integrated Cosmos System) Kupol (Russian: Купол meaning Dome) is a developing programme of Russian early warning satellites as a replacement for the US-KMO and US-K satellites of the Oko programme. The satellites are designed to identify any possible future ballistic missile launches, from outer space, and complement early warning radars such as the Voronezh. This gives advance notice of a nuclear attack and would provide information to the A-135 missile defence system which protects Moscow, as well as other Russian missile defense and counterattack resources. Six satellites were planned to be initially orbited. The first of these was launched on 17 November 2015 and as of November 2022, all six of them are in service.

== Background ==
EKS has been designated to detect and track ballistic missiles launched towards Russia or its allies. The systems have been designed as a replacement for the current system of early warning satellites called Oko, which had its first launch in 1972 and was described in 2005 as "hopelessly outdated". Oko has two types of satellites: US-KMO are in geosynchronous orbits and have an infrared telescope to identify ballistic missile launches. US-K are in Molniya orbits and are an earlier model with optical telescopes and infrared sensors. The Oko system has two control centres with the main one being Serpukhov-15 outside Moscow.

Oko is part of the Main Centre for Missile Attack Warning which is under the Space Command (KK) of the Russian Aerospace Defence Forces.

In 2014, Kommersant published that the first satellite, of a type named Tundra, would be launched in 2014. According to that report they would operate on highly elliptical orbits. The satellite was not launched in 2014, however. It was eventually launched from the Plesetsk Cosmodrome on 17 November 2015, using a Soyuz 2.1b rocket with a Fregat stage, under the name EKS-1 / Tundra-11L. (GRAU designation: 14F142) In November 2022, the sixth satellite was orbited.

== Timeline ==
Information on the new EKS system is scarce but it appears that it was designed by Energia Corp in 1999-2000 and was selected against a proposal from Oko manufacturer NPO Lavochkin. The Russian Ministry of Defence awarded the contract to Energia in 2007 with an expected delivery date of 2008, for a test launch in 2009. In 2009, it was reported to be delayed until late 2011/early 2012. In 2011, the Russian MoD sued Energia for the delay, claiming that a contract extension issued until May 2010 was invalid and asking for 262 million rubles in compensation. According to news reports Energia said that the contract extension was valid and that the problem was with their subcontractors. In addition, they said that the Russian MoD kept changing the specification and demanding things that were beyond the capabilities of the industry. The Russian MoD lost the court case. Energia delivered a satellite in 2009 but as of April 2012 there had not been a test launch.

In April 2012, the minister Alexander Sukhorukov announced that a contract had been signed to manufacture these satellites and that there would be a launch later in 2012. The last satellites of the previous Oko system were Kosmos 2479, launched on 30 March 2012, and Kosmos 2469, launched on 30 September 2010.

The first EKS satellite (Kosmos 2510, EKS-1, Tundra 11L) was eventually launched from Plesetsk on 17 November 2015 using a Soyuz-2.1b rocket and as of May 2020 there were four in service which is the minimum standard strength. A fifth one was launched in November 2021 to start the expansion of the system capabilities. In November 2022, the initial constellation of six satellites was completed.

== GNSS interference ==
In a report published in June 2026, researchers identified three satellites from the EKS constellation as a source of space-based GNSS interference, such as GNSS jamming. Beginning in 2019, the researchers tracked powerful wide-area interference from the satellites over Europe, Greenland, and Canada. Significant interference was detected with the US American GPS, European Galileo, and Chinese BeiDou satellite networks, but interference was minimal on Russia's own GLONASS network. The EKS programme is among the first ever recorded case of navigational satellite interference originating from space.

== Satellites ==
Satellite	COSPAR international designator	NORAD catalog #	Orbit	Launch Date	End date	Estimated Operational Life
Kosmos 2510 (EKS 1) (Tundra 11L)	2015-066A	41032	Molniya 38552 x 1626 km, 63.37°	17 November 2015	Active	
Kosmos 2518 (EKS 2) (Tundra 12L)	2017-027A	42719	Molniya 38552 x 1626 km, 63.37°	25 May 2017	Active	
Kosmos 2541 (EKS 3) (Tundra 13L)	2019-065A	44552	Molniya 38537 x 1646 km, 63.83°	26 September 2019	Active	
Kosmos 2546 (EKS 4) (Tundra 14L)	2020-031A	45608	Molniya 35807 x 1654 km, 63.83°	22 May 2020	Active	
Kosmos 2552 (EKS 5) (Tundra 15L)	2021-113A	49503	Molniya 38761 x 1609 km, 63.83°	25 November 2021	Active	
Kosmos 2563 (EKS 6) (Tundra 16L)	2022-145A	54223	Molniya 38753 x 1596 km, 63.82°	2 November 2022	Active	

Animation of EKS with 4 satellites

Equatorial view

Polar view

Earth fixed frame, front view

Earth fixed frame, side view

Kosmos 2510 · Kosmos 2518 · Kosmos 2541 · Kosmos 2546 · Earth

== Sources ==
- Bart Hendrick (Monday, February 8, 2021) EKS: Russia's space-based missile early warning system the Space Review
- definition of the word: cosmos Cambridge University Dictionary Online
