= Kosmos 2469 =

Russian US-K missile early warning satellite

- Mission type: Early warning
- COSPAR ID: 2010-049A
- SATCAT no.: 37170
- Mission duration: Planned: 4 years Final: 12 years and 15 days

Spacecraft properties
- Spacecraft type: US-K
- Launch mass: 1,900 kilograms (4,200 lb)

Start of mission
- Launch date: 30 September 2010, 17:01 UTC
- Rocket: Molniya-M/2BL
- Launch site: Plesetsk Cosmodrome

End of mission
- Decay date: 15 October 2022

Orbital parameters
- Reference system: Geocentric
- Regime: Molniya
- Perigee altitude: 607 kilometres (377 mi)
- Apogee altitude: 39,741 kilometres (24,694 mi)
- Inclination: 62.8 degrees
- Period: 717.64 mins

Kosmos 2469 (Russian: Космос 2469 meaning Cosmos 2469) was a Russian US-K missile early warning satellite which was launched in 2010 as part of the Russian Space Forces' Oko programme. The satellite was designed to identify missile launches using optical telescopes and infrared sensors.

Kosmos 2469 was launched from Site 16/2 at Plesetsk Cosmodrome in Russia. A Molniya-M carrier rocket with a 2BL upper stage was used to perform the launch, which took place at 17:01 UTC on 30 September 2010. The launch successfully placed the satellite into a molniya orbit. It subsequently received its Kosmos designation, and the international designator 2010-049A. The United States Space Command assigned it the Satellite Catalog Number 37170.

It was the last launch of a US-K satellite and the last launch of a Molniya-M rocket.

On 15 October 2022, Kosmos 2469 re-entered the atmosphere.

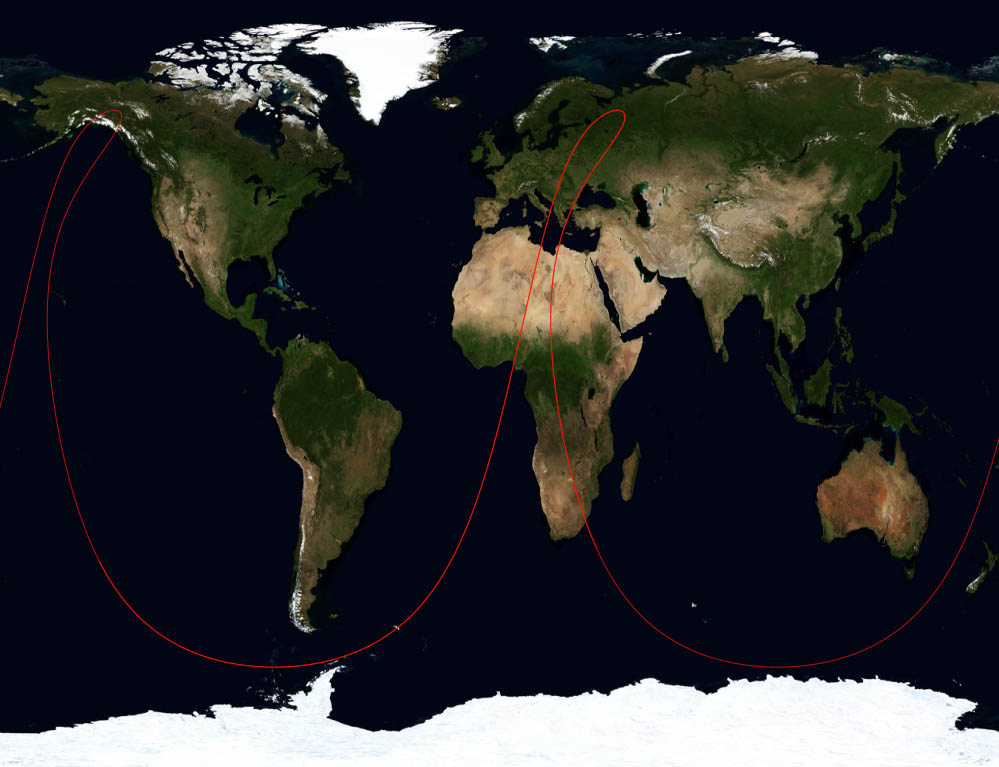
Ground track of Kosmos 2469

== See also ==
- List of Kosmos satellites (2251–2500)
- List of R-7 launches (2010–2014)
- 2010 in spaceflight
