= Ikar (rocket stage) =

Russian rocket upper stage

- Manufacturer: TsSKB-Progress
- Country of origin: Russia
- Used on: Soyuz-U

Associated stages
- Derivatives: Volga

Launch history
- Total launches: 6
- Successes (stage only): 6
- First flight: 9 February 1999; Soyuz-U (Globalstar 23/36/38/40)
- Last flight: 22 November 1999; Soyuz-U (Globalstar 29/34/39/61)

General characteristics
- Height: 2.56 m (8 ft 5 in)
- Diameter: 2.72 m (8 ft 11 in)
- Empty mass: 820 kg (1,810 lb)
- Gross mass: 3,164 kg (6,975 lb)
- Propellant mass: 2,310 kg (5,090 lb)
- Powered by: 1 × S5.144
- Maximum thrust: 2.943 kN (662 lb_{f})
- Specific impulse: 326 s (3.20 km/s)
- Burn time: Up to 600 seconds (up to 50 starts)
- Propellant: N_{2}O_{4} / UDMH

The Ikar was a Russian rocket upper stage introduced by TsSKB Progress in 1999 for use with its Soyuz-U rocket. It was derived from the propulsion module which had been used successfully on more than 30 Yantar reconnaissance satellites, leveraging existing equipment and subsystems to minimize new development. Modifications were limited to updates in command and control systems and adjustments to mechanical and electrical interfaces with payloads.

Weighing 820 kilograms (1,810 lb), the Ikar was situated beneath the payload fairing. It featured an in-flight restart capability of up to 50 times, enabling the deployment of multiple satellites into different orbits. The stage could operate autonomously or be controlled from the ground. It was powered by S5.144 engine, delivering a vacuum thrust of 2.943 kilonewtons (662 lb_{f}), supported by 16 vernier thrusters for precise flight control. The propulsion system used unsymmetrical dimethylhydrazine (UDMH) fuel and dinitrogen tetroxide (N_{2}O_{4}) as its oxidizer.

The Ikar could deliver payloads of 750 to 3,920 kilograms (1,650 to 8,640 lb) to orbits between 250 and 1,400 kilometres (160 and 870 mi) in altitude. While its performance was lower than that of the competing Fregat upper stage, the Ikar offered more precise maneuvering capabilities and a longer autonomous operation time.

The Ikar was used in six launches in 1999, each carrying four GlobalStar satellites. It was replaced by the improved Volga upper stage, which remains in use on the Soyuz-2 rocket.
