= Early warning satellite =

Ballistic missile detection satellite

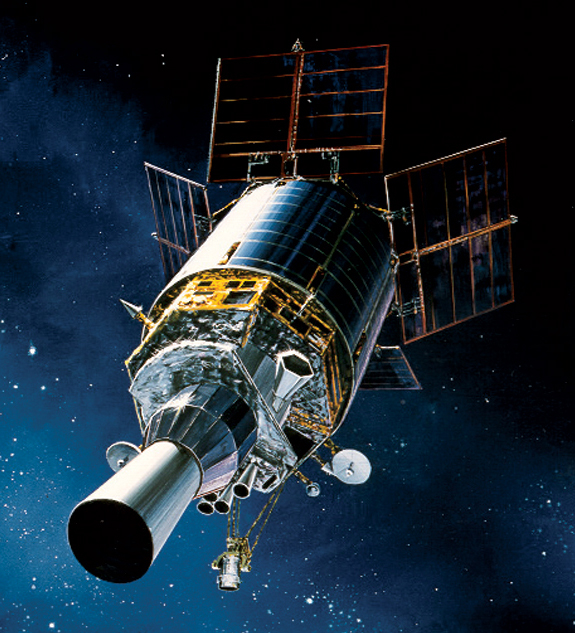
Artist's rendering of a US DSP phase III satellite.

An early warning satellite is an artificial satellite that detects ballistic missile launches in order to provide rapid early warning of a potential missile attack. Modern examples are often multi-purpose vehicles also supporting other wide-area reconnaissance roles.

Early warning satellites normally use infrared sensors that detect the heat of the rocket engines on the missiles. These engines produce enormous amounts of heat that can be easily detected at very long range, through clouds or smoke. Looking down from above, the system provides warning as soon as the missile clears the silo, compared to radar systems which may have difficulty spotting the relatively small targets against the ground. Additionally, the IR detectors are entirely passive, making them more difficult to jam.

Among the major EWS systems are the United States' Defense Support Program, Russia's (originally launched while still the USSR) Oko fleet, and the Chinese Tongxin Jishu Shiyan. The European Union has advanced plans for similar systems, but to date no fully operational system has been deployed.

== Description ==
Example of the firing sequence of the Minuteman III intercontinental ballistic missile: the propulsion allows detection by an early warning satellite during phases 2, 3 and 4 corresponding to the operation of the 3 stages of the missile (A, B and C). This missile rises to between 100 and 200 km in altitude (diagram not to scale).

Early warning satellites primarily work through the detection of infrared radiation. For the detection of ICBMs, this is only possible during the initial phases after a launch. The missile emits a large cloud of hot exhaust as it ascends to the desired altitude. After this stage, detection of the missile is difficult. The thrusters are turned off and the missile separates from previous stages, now carried to its target through momentum alone.

The missile - now without hot exhaust behind it - is rendered invisible to the early warning satellite, making the relatively short first phases of an ICBM a crucial moment for detection. Because the window for detection is small, multiple satellites are necessary for complete coverage of Earth.

In orbit, the satellites are able to detect an ICBM launch through Earth's background infrared radiation due to specific properties in how the water vapor absorbs infrared radiation. Once the missile has passed through the water-rich lower layers of the atmosphere, the specific infrared spectrum given off by the exhaust contrasts against the infrared emitted off the surface of Earth, which must be filtered through the water vapor in the atmosphere. After focusing the light onto hundreds of infrared detectors, the satellite sends the location of the missile launch back to Earth - alerting of a potential missile attack.

== Programs ==
=== United States ===
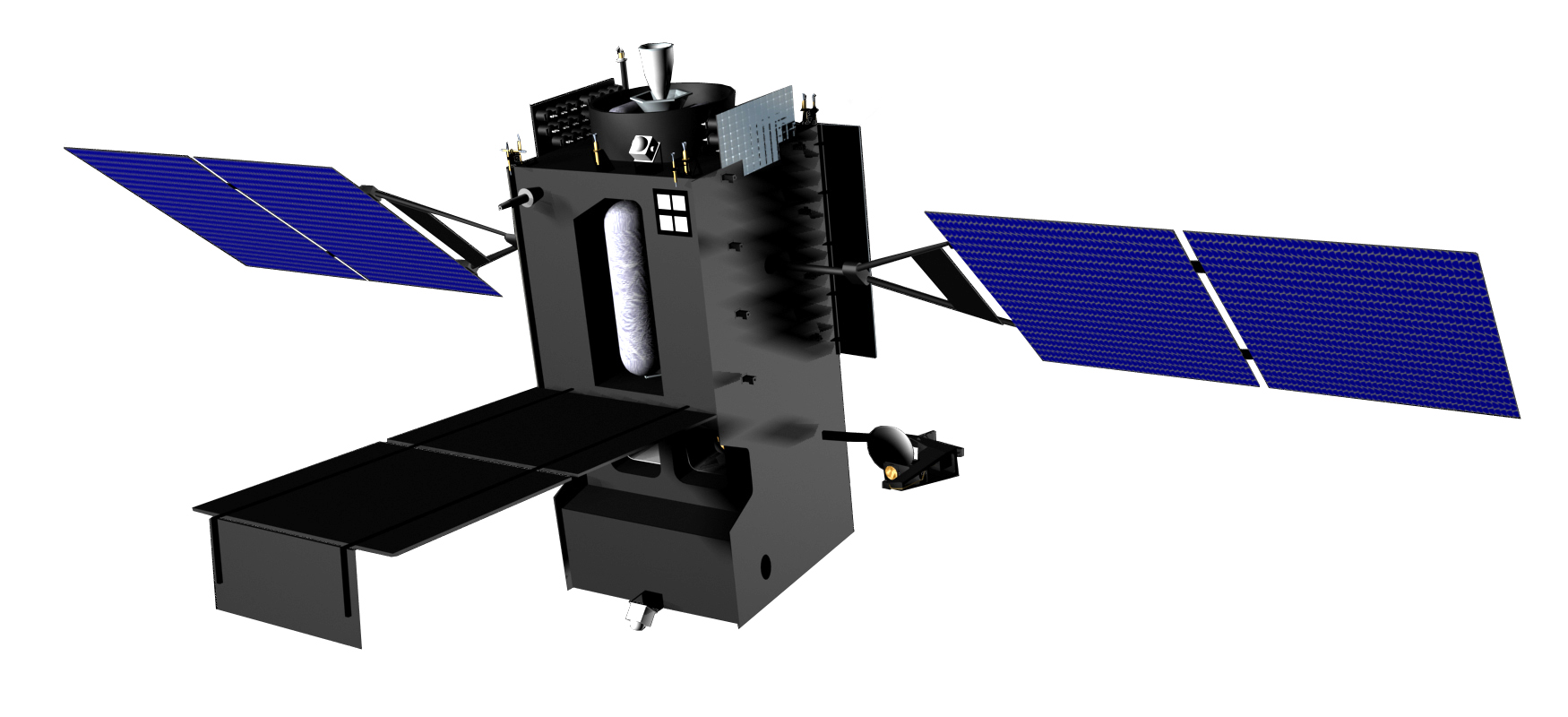
Artist's rendering of a SBIRS-GEO satellite.

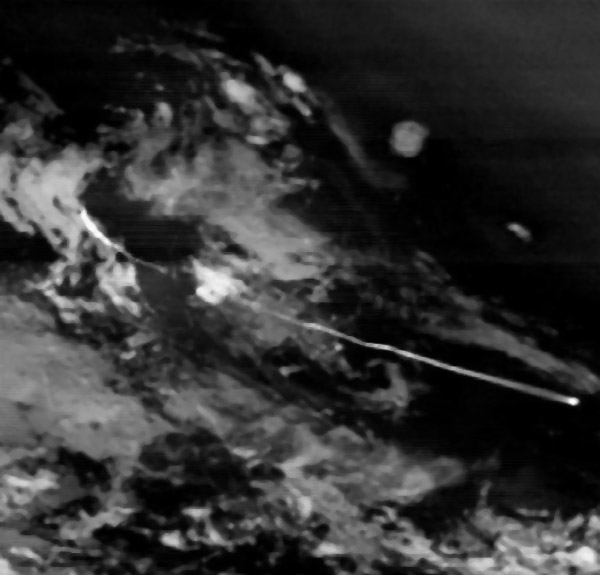
Observation of a Delta II rocket launch by a SBIRS satellite in 2008.

The United States was the first country to attempt to establish a space-based early warning system. The goal was to detect Soviet ballistic missile launches and give 20 to 33 minutes notice of the missile's arrival (against 10 to 25 minutes for the BMEWS ground-based radar network).

The MIDAS satellites were launched between 1960 and 1966, and although they never entered a truly operational phase, they allowed the development of this type of satellite. DSP satellites in geostationary orbit took over in the early 1970s. Several generations of increasingly efficient DSP satellites followed one another until 2007.

Since 2011 the DSPs have been replaced by the SBIRS system, which includes dedicated satellites in geostationary orbit (SBIRS-GEO) and in low Earth orbit (SBIRS-LEO), as well as sensors on board Trumpet satellites for mixed use (wiretapping/warning) located in a Molniya orbit.

=== Soviet Union and Russia ===
The US-K and US-KS satellites developed under the Oko program were the first generation of Soviet early warning satellites. 86 US-K satellites were placed in a Molniya orbit between 1972 and 2010 and 7 US-KS satellites, of a very similar design, were placed in geostationary orbit between 1975 and 1997, the system becoming operational in 1980.

In 1983, a design error in the on-board software of the US-KS satellites led to the so-called fall equinox incident, which consisted of a false nuclear launch warning after a confusion between the heat caused by the reflection of solar radiation in clouds and that released by the launch of a nuclear missile.

Unlike their US counterparts, the US-K and US-KS only detect surface-to-surface ballistic missile launches, due to less sophisticated electronics. Later, the US-KS were replaced by the US-KMO, capable of detecting sea-to-land ballistic missile launches as well. The first of them would be placed in geostationary orbit in 1991.

In the early 1990s, after about ten years of operation, the coverage provided by these satellites was only partial, due to a reduction in the launch rate.

In 2014, the last 3 US-type satellites in service ceased their activities. They have been replaced starting in 2015 by a new generation of satellites: EKS, formerly known as Tundra.

=== Other countries ===
In France, the Direction générale de l'Armement carried out preliminary tests for the development of an early warning satellite. Infrared sensors were tested on two small experimental SPIRALE satellites launched in 2009. However, an operational satellite was not expected to be launched before the end of 2020.

China operates Huoyan-1 series satellites under the Tongxin Jishu Shiyan (TJS) program.

== Satellite series ==
References: · · · · · · · · · · · · · · ·
| Country | Series | Launch dates | Launches number / failures | Launcher | Mass | Orbit | Lifespan | Status | Comments |
|---|---|---|---|---|---|---|---|---|---|
| United States | MIDAS | 1960-1966 | 12/4 | Atlas- Agena | 2 tons approx. | Low Earth orbit | from some weeks to 1 year | Retired | First generation; experimental; 4 versions |
| United States | DSP (phase I) | 1970-1973 | 4/1 | Titan-3C | 907 kg | Geostationary orbit | 1,25 years | Retired | |
| United States | DSP (phase II) | 1975-1977 | 3/0 | Titan-3C | 1043 kg | Geostationary orbit | 2 years | Retired | |
| United States | DSP (phase II MOS/PIM) | 1979-1984 | 4/0 | Titan-3C | 1170 kg | Geostationary orbit | 3 years | Retired | |
| United States | DSP (phase II v2) | 1954-1987 | 2/0 | Titan-IVD Transtage | 1674 kg | Geostationary orbit | 3 years | Retired | |
| United States | DSP (phase III) | 1989-2007 | 10/1 | Titan-IVD Transtage | 2386 kg | Geostationary orbit | ¿3 years? | Retired | To be replaced by SBIRS |
| United States | SBIRS | 2011- | 12/0 | Atlas V 401 or Delta IV-4M+(4,2) | 4500 kg (SBIRS-GEO) 1000 kg (SBIRS-LOW) | Geostationary orbit / Low Earth orbit / Molniya orbit | 12 years (SBIRS-GEO) | Operational | Geostationary satellites (SBIRS-GEO), satellites in low orbit (SBIRS-LEO), and sensors on Trumpet satellites in Molniya orbit |
| USSR/Russia | US-K | 1972-2010 | 86/3 | Molniya | 2400 kg | Molniya orbit | 1 year | Retired | Replaced by EKS |
| USSR/Russia | US-KS | 1975-1997 | 7/0 | Proton-K/Blok-DM | 2400 kg | Geostationary orbit | 1 year | Retired | Almost identical to the US-K, replaced by the US-KMO |
| USSR/Russia | US-KMO | 1991-2012 | 8/0 | Proton-K/Blok-DM-2 | 2600 kg | Geostationary orbit | 5–7 years | Retired | Replaced by EKS |
| Russia | EKS | 2015- | 6/0 | Soyuz-2.1b/Fregat-M | ? | Molniya orbit | ? | Operational | |
| China | Huoyan-1 | 2017- | 4/0 | Long March 3B/E | ? | Geostationary orbit/Molniya orbit | ? | Operational | |
| United States | NG-OPIR | 2025- | 8 (Planned) | Vulcan Centaur or Falcon Heavy | ? | Geostationary orbit / Polar orbit | ? | Planned | Geostationary satellites (NG-OPIR-GEO), satellites in low orbit (NG-OPIR-Polar). |

== See also ==
- Missile defense
- Militarisation of space
- Space force
- Space domain awareness
- Space warfare

== Bibliography ==
- Jacques Villain (2010). Satellites espions (in French). Paris: Vuibert. p. 232. ISBN 978-2-7117-2498-7.
