= US-KMO =

Series of Russian missile warning satellites, 1991-2012

- Manufacturer: NPO Lavochkin
- Country of origin: Soviet Union; Russia
- Operator: VKS (1991–2011); VKO (2011—)
- Applications: Early warning/Missile defence

Specifications
- Bus: GRAU: 71Kh6
- Launch mass: 2600
- Regime: Geosynchronous
- Design life: 5-7 years

Production
- Status: Out of production
- Launched: 8
- Operational: 1
- Retired: 4
- Failed: 3
- Lost: 0
- Maiden launch: Kosmos 2133; 14 February 1991
- Last launch: Kosmos 2479; 30 March 2012

Related spacecraft
- Derived from: US-KS

US-KMO (Russian: УС-КМО), (Note: an abbreviation for Upravlyaemy Sputnik - Kontinenty Morya Okeany (Russian: Управляемый Спутник - Континенты Моря Океаны) meaning Controllable Satellite - Continents, Oceans, Seas) is a series of Russian, previously Soviet, satellites which are used to identify ballistic missile launches. They provide early warning of missile attack and give information for the Moscow A-135 anti-ballistic missile system. They were run by the Russian Space Forces and it was succeeded by the Aerospace Defence Forces.

These satellites are part of the Oko programme and are in geosynchronous orbit 35,750 km above the Earth's equator. This means that they are always in the same place with the same field of view. Western locations give Russia coverage of missile launches in the United States whereas more eastern ones give coverage of China and the Middle East. They complement ground-based early warning radars and the US-K satellites which are in molniya orbits.

The first prototype satellite was launched on 8 October 1975, atop a Proton-K/DM-2 carrier rocket from Baikonur Cosmodrome. The most recent, and last of the series, was launched on 30 March 2012. As of December 2015, the entire Oko programme is being replaced by the new EKS system.

== Technical information ==
US-KMO satellites were built by NPO Lavochkin. They feature a 1-metre diameter infrared telescope with a 4.5 metre hood which identifies missiles by their exhausts. They have an operational life of 5 to 7 years, although actual performance has been variable.

The satellites have the GRAU index 71Kh6.

The Oko western control centre is at Serpukhov-15, Moscow Oblast although Podvig notes that satellites in the 3 easternmost positions would be out of range of this centre, and would be controlled by the eastern control centre at Pivan-1, Khabarovsk Krai.

== Naming ==
Location of the seven satellite positions above the equator

These satellites have been mistakenly described as Prognoz (unrelated to the earlier Prognoz SO-M programme) as the positions they occupy are reserved with the ITU under the codename Prognoz.

Location Name	Longitude	Control Centre	Satellites
Prognoz-1	24°W	Serpukhov-15	Kosmos 2379 Kosmos 2282 Kosmos 2224 Kosmos 2133
Prognoz-2	12°E	Serpukhov-15	Kosmos 2224 Kosmos 2133
Prognoz-3	35°E	Serpukhov-15	Kosmos 2133
Prognoz-4	80°E	Serpukhov-15	Kosmos 2379 Kosmos 2350 Kosmos 2133 Kosmos 2440 Kosmos 2479
Prognoz-5	130°E	Pivan-1?	
Prognoz-6	166°E	Pivan-1?	
Prognoz-7	159°W	Pivan-1?	

== Satellites ==
Satellite	COSPAR ID	SATCAT No.	Product Number	Launch Date	Estimated Mission End Date	Estimated Operational Life
Kosmos 2133	1991-010A	21111	7120	14 February 1991	9 November 1995	4 years 9 months
Kosmos 2224	1992-088A	22269	7121	17 December 1992	17 June 1999	6 years 6 months
Kosmos 2282	1994-038A	23168	7123	6 July 1994	29 December 1995	1 year 5 months
Kosmos 2350	1998-025A	25315	7122	29 April 1998	29 June 1998	2 months
Kosmos 2379	2001-037A	26892	7124	24 August 2001	late 2009/early 2010	8 years
Kosmos 2397	2003-015A	27775	7126	24 April 2003	June 2003	2 months
Kosmos 2440	2008-033A	33108	7127	26 June 2008	February 2010	1 year 4 months
Kosmos 2479	2012-012A	38101		30 March 2012		

== See also ==
- US-KS
- US-K
- Defense Support Program, a similar United States system
- EKS, the new system replacing the entire Oko programme.
