= Infrared telescope =

Telescope that uses infrared light

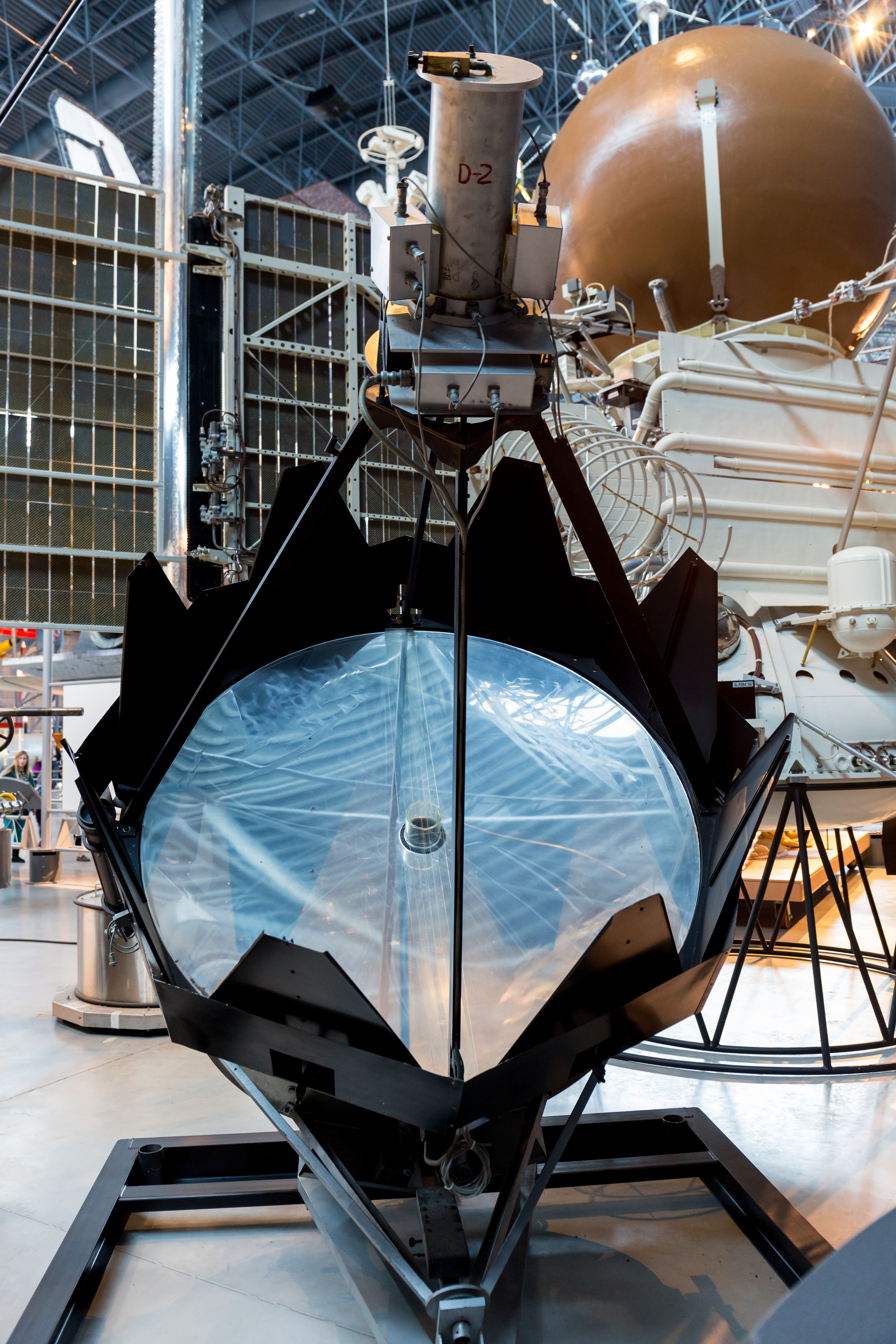
An infrared telescope which was installed at the Mount Wilson Observatory and completed the first 2.2-micron survey of the entire sky

An infrared-visible comparison view of the Cat’s Paw Nebula

A infrared telescope is a telescope used to observe distant objects in infrared light, one of several types of radiation present in the electromagnetic spectrum.

All celestial objects with a temperature above absolute zero emit some form of electromagnetic radiation. In order to study the universe, scientists use several different types of telescopes to detect these different types of emitted radiation in the electromagnetic spectrum. Some of these are gamma ray, x-ray, ultra-violet, regular visible light (optical), as well as infrared telescopes.

== History ==
There were several key developments that led to the invention of the infrared telescope:

- In 1800, William Herschel discovered infrared radiation.
- In 1878, Samuel Pierpoint Langley created the first bolometer. This was a very sensitive instrument that could electrically detect incredibly small changes in temperature in the infrared spectrum.
- Thomas Edison used an alternative technology, his tasimeter, to measure heat in the Sun's corona during the solar eclipse of July 29, 1878.
- In the 1950s, scientists used lead-sulfide detectors to detect the infrared radiation from space. These detectors were cooled with liquid nitrogen.
- Between 1959 and 1961, Harold Johnson created near-infrared photometers which allowed scientists to measure thousands of stars.
- In 1961, Frank Low invented the first germanium bolometer. This invention, cooled by liquid helium, led the way for current infrared telescope development.

Infrared telescopes may be ground-based, air-borne, or space telescopes. They contain an infrared camera with a special solid-state infrared detector which must be cooled to cryogenic temperatures.

Ground-based telescopes were the first to be used to observe outer space in infrared. Their popularity increased in the mid-1960s. Ground-based telescopes have limitations because water vapor in the Earth's atmosphere absorbs infrared radiation. Ground-based infrared telescopes tend to be placed on high mountains and in very dry climates to improve visibility.

In the 1960s, scientists used balloons to lift infrared telescopes to higher altitudes. With balloons, they were able to reach about 25 miles (40 kilometres) up. In 1967, infrared telescopes were placed on rockets. These were the first air-borne infrared telescopes. Since then, aircraft like the Kuiper Airborne Observatory (KAO) have been adapted to carry infrared telescopes. A more recent air-borne infrared telescope to reach the stratosphere was NASA's Stratospheric Observatory for Infrared Astronomy (SOFIA) in May 2010. Together, United States scientists and the German Aerospace Center scientists placed a 17-ton infrared telescope on a Boeing 747 jet airplane.

Placing infrared telescopes in space eliminates the interference from the Earth's atmosphere. One of the most significant infrared telescope projects was the Infrared Astronomical Satellite (IRAS) that launched in 1983. It revealed information about other galaxies, as well as information about the center of our galaxy the Milky Way. NASA presently has solar-powered spacecraft in space with an infrared telescope called the James Webb Space Telescope (JWST). It was launched on December 25, 2021.

== Comparison of infrared telescopes ==
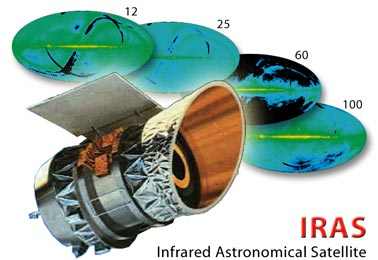
IRAS, the first infrared space telescope

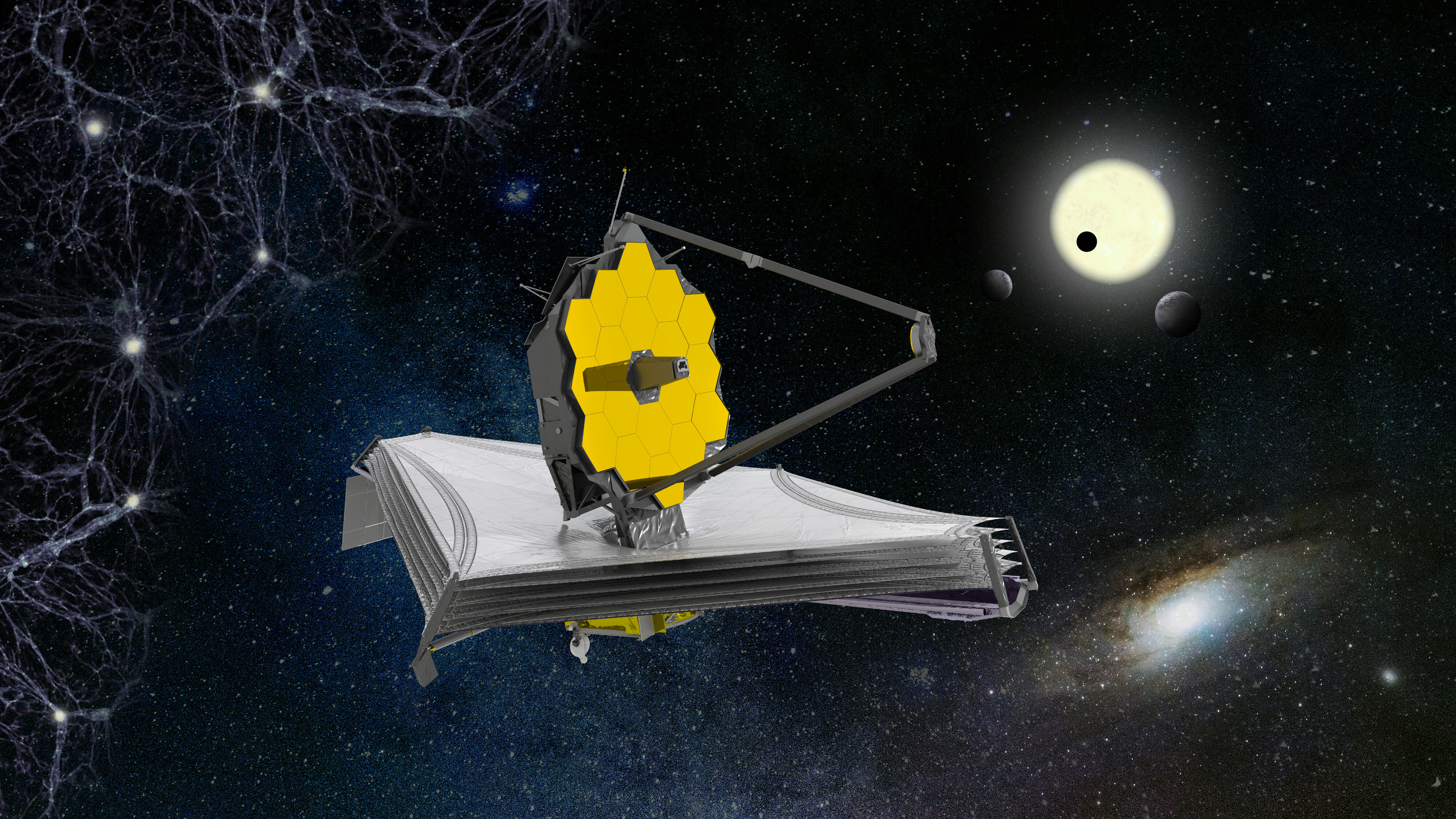
James Webb Space Telescope, a flagman NASA infrared telescope

The wavelength of visible light is about 0.4 μm to 0.7 μm, and 0.75 μm to 1000 μm (1 mm) is a typical range for infrared astronomy, far-infrared astronomy, to submillimetre astronomy.

Name	Image	Effective aperture	Wavelength Coverage	Site	Year(s)	Refs
TAO telescope		6.5 m (260 in)	0.9-38 μm	University of Tokyo Atacama Obs., Chile	2024	
James Webb Space Telescope		6.5 m (260 in)	0.6-28.5 μm	Space, Sun-Earth L2	2022-	
VISTA		4.1 m (160 in)	0.85 – 2.3 μm	Paranal Obs., Chile	2008	
Eastern Anatolia Observatory		3.94 m (155 in)	0.9 – 2.5 μm	Erzurum, Turkey	2024	
United Kingdom Infrared Telescope		3.8 m (150 in)	0.8 - 20 μm	Mauna Kea Obs., Hawaii	1978-2026	
Herschel Space Observatory		3.5 m (140 in)	60-672 μm	Space, Sun-Earth L2	2009-2013	
Infrared Telescope Facility		3.2 m (130 in)	0.8 - 25 μm	Mauna Kea, Hawaii	1979	
SOFIA		2.5 m (98 in)	0.3 - 655 μm	747SP; Stratosphere	2010-2022	
Wyoming Infrared Observatory		2.3 m (91 in)	0.4 - 0.8 μm	Jelm mountain, 9656 ft. (2943m)	1977	

Comparison of infrared space telescopes

Name	Effective aperture cm (in)	Wavelength Coverage	Year	Refs
James Webb (JWST)	650 cm	0.6-28.5 μm	2021-	
Herschel Obs.	350 cm (138 in)	60-672 μm	2009 - 2013	
Hubble WFC3	240 cm	0.2-1.7 μm	2009 -	
Euclid NISP	120 cm	0.92-2.02 μm	2023 -	
Spitzer	85 cm	3-180 μm	2003 - 2020	
Akari	68.5 cm	2-200 μm	2006 -2011	
ISO	60 cm	2.5-240 μm	1995-1998	
IRAS	57 cm	5-100 μm	1983	
NEO Surveyor	50 cm	4–5.2 & 6–10 μm	2028 (planned)	
WISE/NEOWISE	40 cm	3-25 μm	2009-2011 & 2013 -	
MSX	33 cm	4.3-21 μm	1996 - 1997	
SPHEREx	20 cm	0.75 to 5.0 μm	2025 -	
Spacelab IRT	15.2 cm	1.7-118 μm	1985 Aug	

== See also ==
- Infrared astronomy
- List of telescope types
