= Oko =

Russian early warning system

Oko (Old Russian: Око, lit. 'Eye') (Note: Also known as SPRN (СПРН, from Russian: спутник для предупреждения о ракетном нападении, lit. 'satellite for warning on rocket attack') according to one source, but SPRN is more commonly used to describe the whole early warning system, система предупреждения о ракетном нападении (system of missile warning), which includes Oko but also includes early warning radar.) is a Russian (previously Soviet) missile defence early warning programme consisting of satellites in Molniya and geosynchronous orbits. Oko satellites are used to identify launches of ballistic missiles by detection of their engines' exhaust plume in infrared light, and complement other early warning facilities such as Voronezh, Daryal and Dnepr radars. The information provided by these sensors can be used for the A-135 anti-ballistic missile system which defends Moscow. The satellites are run by the Russian Aerospace Forces, and previously the Russian Aerospace Defence Forces and Russian Space Forces. Since November 2015, it is being replaced by the new EKS system.

== History ==
Development of the Oko system began in the early 1970s under the design bureau headed by AI Savin, which became TsNII Kometa. The spacecraft element was designed by NPO Lavochkin. The first satellite was launched in 1972 but it was not until 1978 that the overall system became operational and 1982 before it was placed on combat duty. The system had a major malfunction in 1983 when it mistakenly identified sunlight on high altitude clouds as a missile attack. Stanislav Petrov, on duty at the new control centre in Serpukhov-15, Moscow Oblast, discounted the warning due to the newness of the system and the lack of corroboration from ground-based radar.

The vast majority of the satellites launched (86 out of 100 as of March 2012) have been the first generation US-K satellites which operate in molniya orbits. Seven first generation satellites were launched into geosynchronous orbits, called US-KS, starting in 1975. A decree of 3 September 1979 led to the creation of the second generation satellites US-KMO which had their first launch in 1991. In total, 101 satellites have been launched.

The US-K satellites, were launched by Molniya-M launch vehicles with Blok 2BL upper stages from Plesetsk Cosmodrome. The US-KS and US-KMO operate in geosynchronous orbits and were launched by Proton with DM-2 upper stages from Baikonur.

The last US-KMO satellite (Kosmos 2479) was launched on 30 March 2012 and the last US-K satellite (Kosmos 2469) on 30 September 2010. They are due to be replaced by a new system called EKS.

== Debris ==
The first generation Molniya-type orbit Oko satellites launched between 1976 and 1983 were prone to disintegration, resulting in extensive space debris. The reason they broke up was because they each carried an on-board explosive charge that would be used to destroy the satellite in the case of a malfunction. Unfortunately, control of the explosive charge was itself unreliable and it would often explode, rendering the satellite inoperative, while it was still under control. The design was eventually changed, and the explosive charge in Kosmos 1481 was the last to explode early.

== Facilities ==
The system has two dedicated control centres. The western centre is at Serpukhov-15 (Russian: Серпухов-15) near Kurilovo outside Moscow (55°04′06″N 37°02′29″E) and the eastern centre is at Pivan-1 (Russian: Пивань-1) (50°20′57″N 137°11′22″E) in the Russian Far East. The centre at Serpukhov-15 burned down in 2001 which caused the loss of contact with currently orbiting satellites.

== See also ==
- Defense Support Program
- Space-Based Infrared System
- EKS, the new system replacing the entire Oko program.
