= 177th Fighter Aviation Regiment PVO =

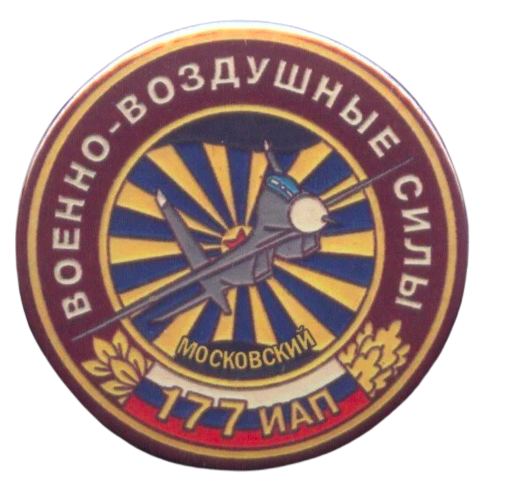
- 2000s sleeve insignia of the regiment
- Active: 1941–2009
- Country: Soviet Union; Russia
- Branch: Soviet Air Defense Forces; Russian Air Defense Forces; Russian Air Force
- Type: Fighter aviation regiment
- Garrison/HQ: Lodeynoye Pole (1960–2009)
- Engagements: World War II; Korean War
- Battle honours: Moscow

The 177th Fighter Aviation Regiment PVO (Russian: 177-й истребительный авиационный полк ПВО; Military Unit Number 10232) was a fighter regiment of the Soviet Air Defense Forces (Russian: Войска́ противовозду́шной оборо́ны; PVO) during World War II and the Cold War, later becoming part of the Russian Air Defense Forces and finally the Russian Air Force.

After completing its formation in July 1941, the 177th provided air defense for Moscow during World War II. It began the war equipped with the Polikarpov I-16 fighter, converting to the Mikoyan-Gurevich MiG-3 fighter in late 1941. After the front had moved far away from Moscow, the regiment was re-equipped with Supermarine Spitfire fighters in late 1944. It moved northeast to an airfield near Yaroslavl, 250 kilometers (160 mi) from Moscow, in the late 1940s, receiving Mikoyan-Gurevich MiG-9 jet fighters, which were swiftly replaced by Mikoyan-Gurevich MiG-15s. In mid-1950, the regiment relocated to the Soviet Far East before deploying to northeast Manchuria with the 64th Fighter Aviation Corps, part of the first rotation of Soviet air units in the Korean War. The regiment fought over Korea until returning to the Soviet Union in February 1951. It was stationed in Leningrad Oblast, successively operating the Sukhoi Su-9, Mikoyan-Gurevich MiG-23, and Sukhoi Su-27 as interceptors from Lodeynoye Pole before its disbandment in 2009 as part of Russian Air Force reforms.

== World War II ==
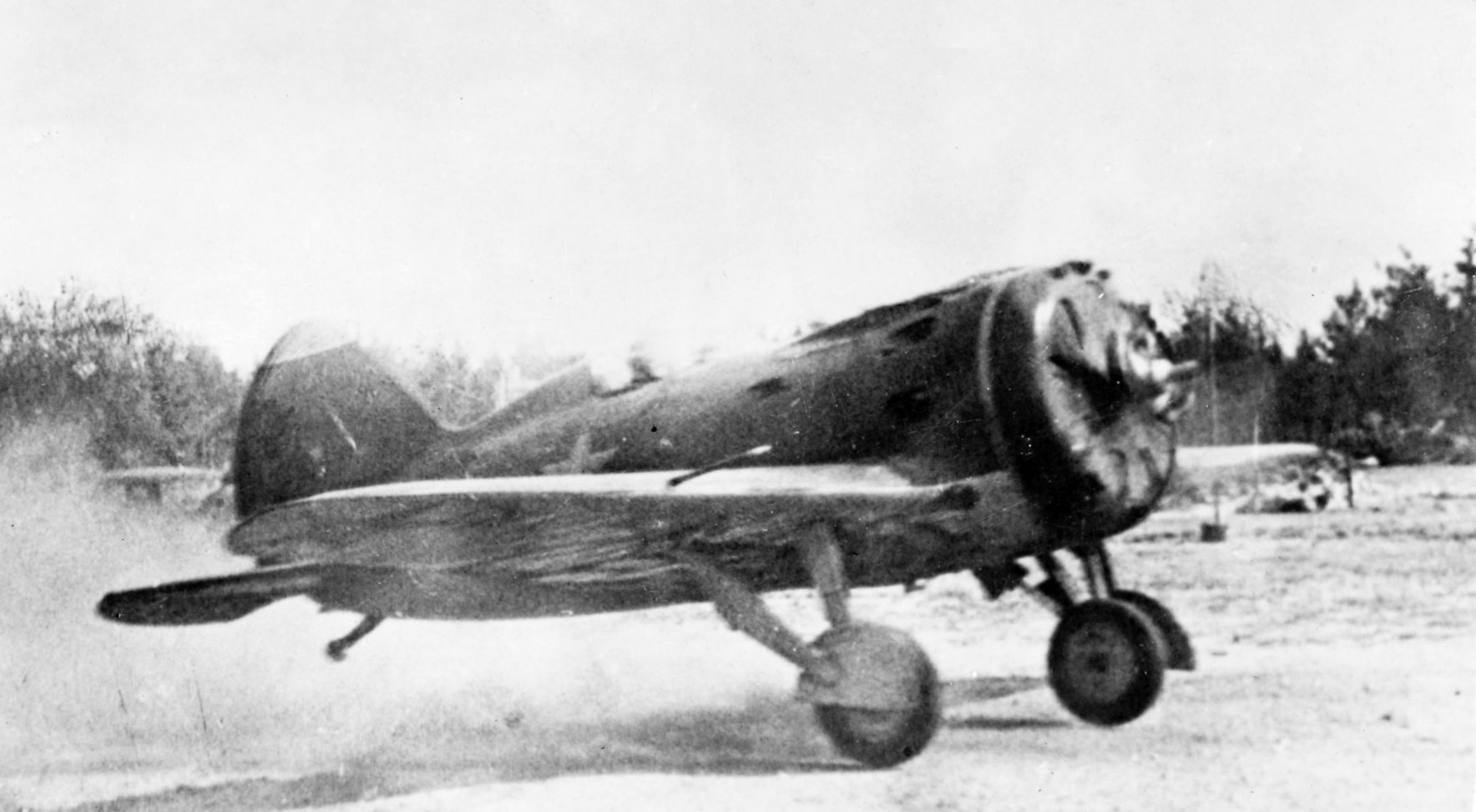
An I-16 of the type flown by the regiment in 1941

The 177th Fighter Aviation Regiment (IAP) was formed between 10 May and 15 July 1941 at Klin as part of the Air Forces (VVS) of the Moscow Military District. It was raised from cadres drawn from the 11th, 34th, and 120th Fighter Aviation Regiments in accordance with an order of 27 March, and included three squadrons of three flights each for a nominal strength of 30 Polikarpov I-16 fighters. On 16 July, after completing its formation, the regiment joined the 6th Fighter Aviation Corps (IAK) of the Moscow Air Defense Zone and began combat operations in World War II, following the beginning of Operation Barbarossa, the German invasion of the Soviet Union, on 22 June, and the subsequent German advance towards Moscow. It provided air cover for the city of Moscow and ground troops, often flying night missions. Captain I.D. Samsonov claimed the regiment's first known victory on 26 July, a Junkers Ju 88 bomber in the vicinity of Lenino station. Four days later, the regiment received a squadron of 15 pilots from the 27th Fighter Aviation Regiment. The squadron commander, Major Mikhail Ivanovich Korolyov, was promoted to command the regiment. On 7 August, I-16 pilot Junior Lieutenant Viktor Talalikhin made the first Soviet night ramming attack when he downed a Heinkel He 111 bomber over Moscow; he was made a Hero of the Soviet Union for the action. With three victories in the Winter War and four victories in World War II, Talalikhin was the regiment's only I-16 ace.

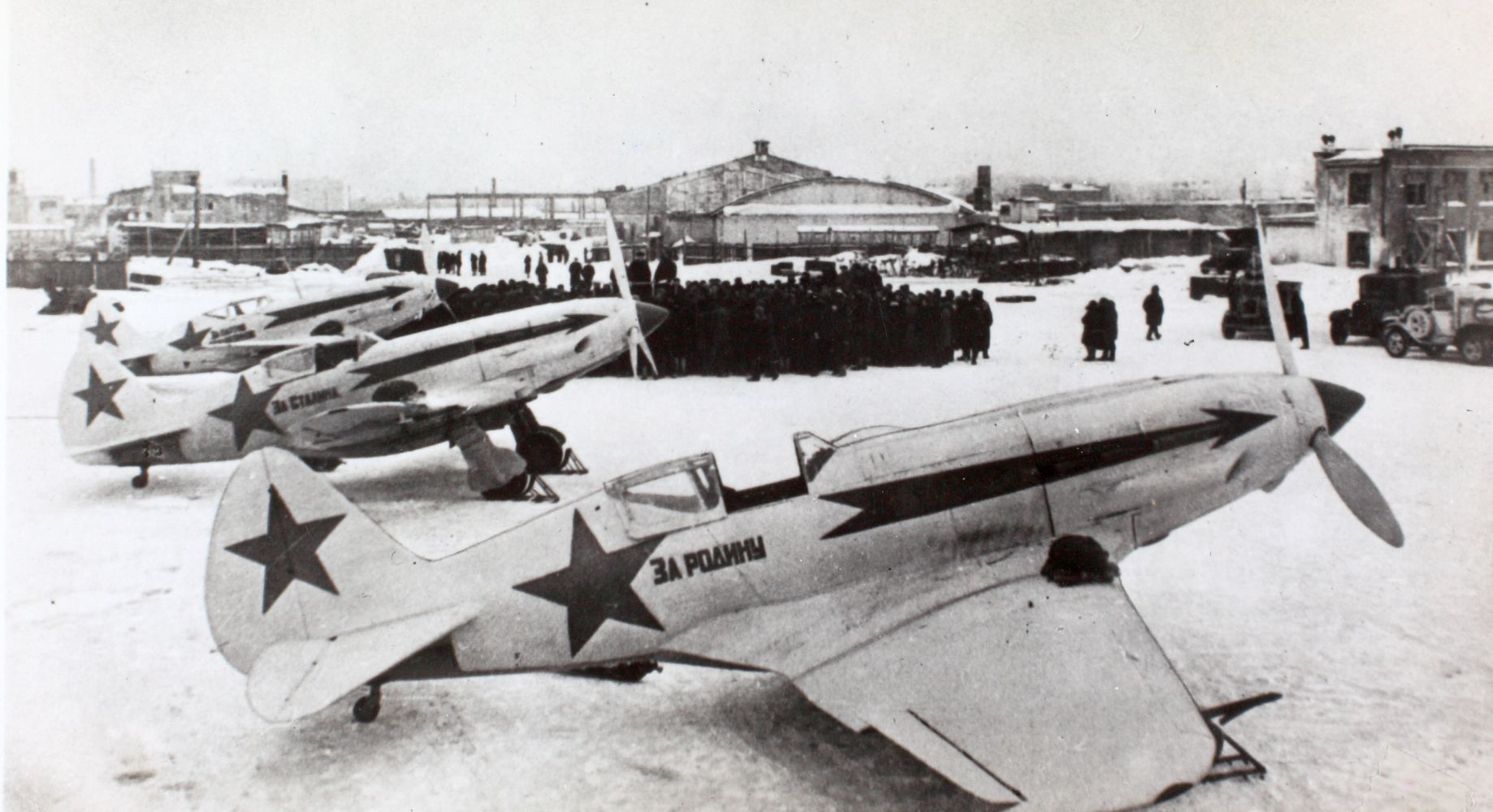
A group of MiG-3s of the type flown by the regiment from 1941 to 1944

Around early September 1941, the 177th began re-equipping with new Mikoyan-Gurevich MiG-3 fighters, after transferring its few remaining I-16s to the 11th, 34th, and 120th IAPs. At this time the regiment was reinforced by 42 sergeant pilots, new graduates of accelerated wartime training courses. These pilots were trained at Dubrovitsy airfield near Podolsk on UTI-4s (I-16 training variant) and I-16s, the best being sent on night missions. The regimental political officer, Battalion Commissar N.L. Khodyrev, flew a MiG from the unit at night for the first time on 31 August. By the end of September, half of the I-16s had been replaced by MiGs, and nine of its pilots were assessed as combat ready. After Operation Typhoon, the German offensive on Moscow, began in early October, the regiment temporarily joined the 77th Mixed Aviation Division of the VVS, operating in the southern defensive sector. It flew regular patrols along the Moscow–Warsaw road, its first victory being credited to Senior Lieutenant Samodurov and his wingman, Junior Lieutenant Muravyev, who claimed the downing of a Henschel Hs 126 reconnaissance aircraft. Two MiG-3 pilots from the regiment, Senior Lieutenant Alexander Pechenevsky, and Lieutenant Ivan Tyabin, became MiG-3 aces after each claimed five solo victories and three shared victories.

On 5 April 1942, as part of the 6th IAK, the 177th joined the Moscow Air Defense Front. From 21 September to 1 November, a group of 20 MiG-3s from the regiment fought on the front, operationally subordinated to the 106th Fighter Aviation Division (IAD) of the Bologoye Air Defense Region. The 177th returned to the 6th IAK on 1 November. On 9 June 1943, when the corps reorganized into the 1st Fighter Air Defense Army, the regiment joined the newly formed 319th Fighter Aviation Division. The front was reorganized as the Special Moscow Air Defense Army on 4 July, becoming part of the Western Air Defense Front. On 1 October, as the front moved far from Moscow, the 177th was excluded from the active army (forces directly engaging in combat or close to combat zones). In late 1944, the regiment began to re-equip with British Lend-Lease Supermarine Spitfire Mk.IX fighters.

During the war, the 177th flew 4,708 missions, conducted 172 air battles, and claimed 78 enemy aircraft downed. It was credited with destroying three tanks, 40 vehicles, an anti-aircraft battery, and ten anti-aircraft guns on ground-attack missions, for the loss of 18 pilots: three were killed in air combat, two were lost to anti-aircraft fire, ten failed to return from missions, and three were non-combat losses. The unit lost 33 aircraft, 22 in combat.

=== Commanders ===
The following officers commanded the regiment during World War II:

- Major (promoted to Lieutenant Colonel) Mikhail Korolyov (July – December 1941)
- Lieutenant Colonel Vladimir Lashin (December 1941 – July 1942)
- Major Anton Panov (August 1942 – April 1944)
- Major Anatoly Chermodanov (April 1944 – May 1945)

== Postwar years ==
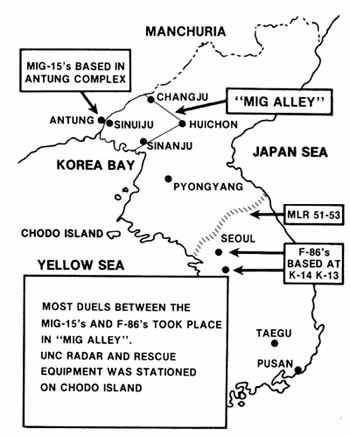
A map showing key air combat locations in the Korean War

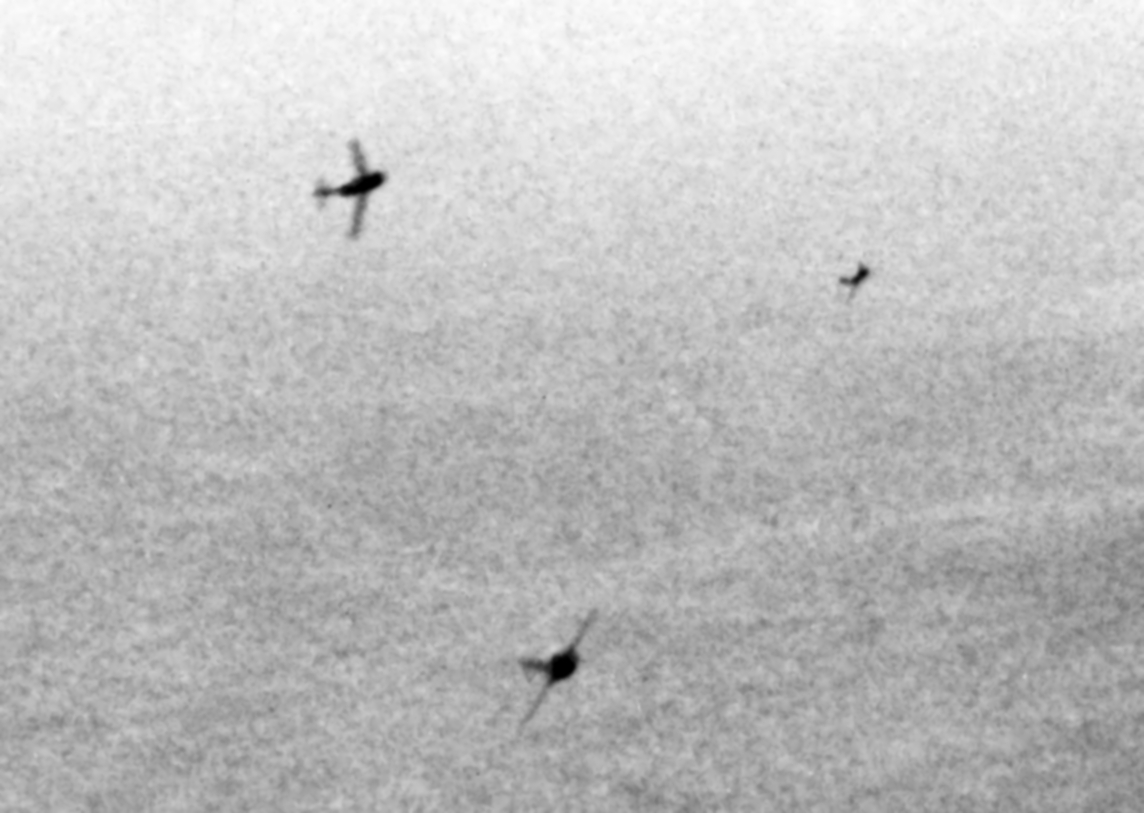
Three MiG-15s attacking American B-29s in 1951

On 9 September 1948, the 177th was transferred to the 303rd Fighter Aviation Division of the 19th Fighter Aviation Army's 31st Fighter Aviation Corps at Yaroslavl's Dyadkovo airfield. In December, it began re-equipping with Mikoyan-Gurevich MiG-9 jet fighters. The regiment began re-equipping with new Mikoyan-Gurevich MiG-15 fighters in March 1950. On 7 July, with the 303rd IAD, the regiment arrived at Vozdvizhenka in the Far Eastern Military District, leaving its aircraft behind. The 177th was transferred out of the division on 18 September, and was based at Sanshilipu in the People's Republic of China, to cover the main People's Liberation Army Navy base at Dalian. On 6 October, the regiment joined the 50th Fighter Aviation Division (the former 106th IAD), receiving 30 new MiG-15bis fighters.

=== Korean War ===
The 50th IAD became part of the 64th Fighter Aviation Corps in November 1950, flying missions from airfields in northeastern Manchuria (part of northeast China) against UN aircraft in an area that became known as MiG Alley during the Korean War. The 50th was part of the first rotation of Soviet aviation units of the corps, and had its red stars replaced by Korean People's Army Air Force roundels. On 20 November, the regiment flew from Sanshilipu to Anshan, under the command of Colonel V. Ia. Terentyev. It was not yet combat ready, and spent the next weeks familiarizing itself with the area of operations and practicing formation flying. It also had to wait for the arrival of more drop tanks after the other regiment of the division, the 29th Guards Fighter Aviation Regiment, began flying combat missions on 30 November.

Pilots from the regiment flew their first combat sortie on 12 December, but did not encounter enemy aircraft. A squadron from the regiment moved forward to Antung on 15 December and began flying missions, and was joined by the two remaining squadrons on 25 December. The 177th's pilots first met enemy aircraft on 17 December, but the action concluded without result. The deputy commander of the regiment's 1st Squadron, Captain Nikolay Vorobyov, was the second Soviet airman to claim a North American F-86 Sabre fighter downed on 22 December, but this claim was the first corroborated by American records. Later that day, eight aircraft from the 2nd Squadron, still flying from Anshan, dueled with 16 Sabres, claiming three kills with the loss of two MiGs and a pilot, although the USAF did not report any losses for this engagement.

On 27 December, eight MiGs of the 1st Squadron and several from the 3rd Squadron scrambled to intercept an American raid in the Chongju station area of Lockheed F-80 Shooting Star fighter-bombers escorted by Sabres. A 1st Squadron pilot claimed a Sabre downed, which was not corroborated by the USAF. Six aircraft from the 2nd Squadron took off following the other two squadrons, Captain Mikhail Fomin downing an F-80 of the 25th Fighter-Interceptor Squadron after the MiGs bypassed the Sabre escort. During the month, the regiment's pilots flew half of the division's 452 combat sorties, claiming to have downed eight F-86s and two F-80s for the loss of two MiGs and one pilot.

The 177th flew missions on 3 and 6 January 1951, but did not encounter enemy aircraft. On 10 January, a lone Boeing RB-29 Superfortress reconnaissance aircraft was intercepted and reported to have been downed in the Anju area by pilots from the 1st Squadron under Major Pavel Mikhailov, the only enemy aircraft encountered in early January; no RB-29 was recorded as lost by the USAF on that date. Six pilots from the 2nd Squadron led by Fomin reported an engagement with four Republic F-84 Thunderjet fighter-bombers over Kaesong Station in the Anju area on 20 January, and claimed to have shot down one. The next day, nine pilots from the 3rd Squadron reported an engagement with eight F-84s, claiming to have downed four. None of these claims were corroborated by the USAF.

The regiment's three squadrons fought on 24 January 1951 against what they estimated as 30 F-80s and F-84s, and claimed to have downed an F-80 and an F-84 without loss; these claims were uncorroborated by the USAF. In January, the 177th reported that it had downed eleven aircraft, including one RB-29, three F-80s, and seven F-84s, at the cost of three MiGs damaged in 200 individual sorties and five group combats. On 3 February, on a patrol by 10 MiGs from the 1st Squadron under Mikhailov, two F-80s were reported by pilots to have been shot down north of Sinuiju; these claims were uncorroborated by the USAF.

The 177th IAP flew its last combat sortie on 6 February 1951, ending its tour. Turning its aircraft over to the replacement 151st Guards Fighter Aviation Division, the regiment moved back to Anshan before leaving for the Soviet Union within several days. During its combat tour, the IAP flew over 400 sorties, conducted 13 air battles, and was credited with downing 24 UN aircraft, including one bomber, fifteen fighter-bombers, and eight fighters, as well as three probables. The regiment lost one pilot and two MiGs. Mikhailov and Fomin were the regiment's highest-scoring pilots, each with three victories.

=== Cold War after return from China ===
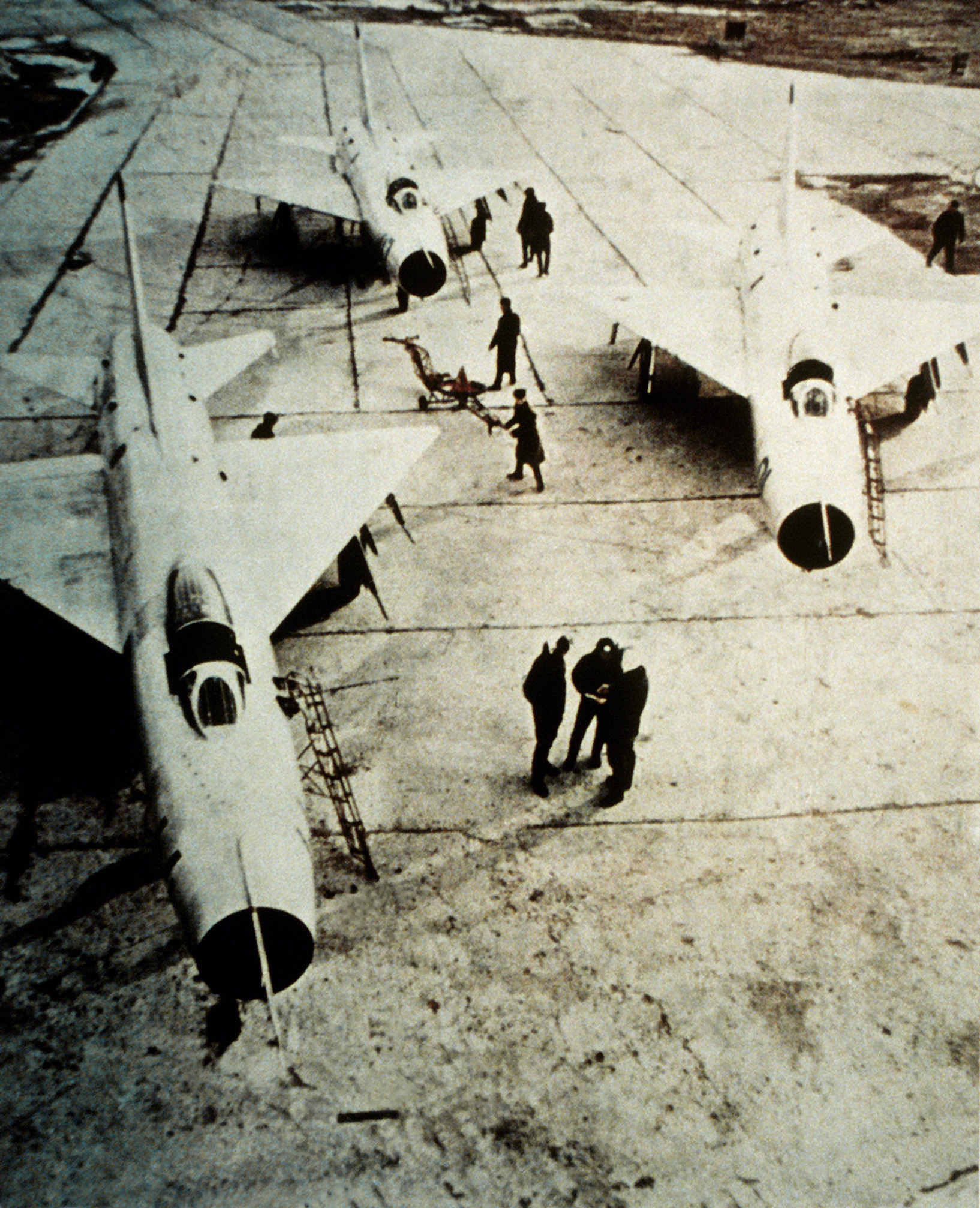
Three parked Su-9s similar to those flown by the regiment between 1960 and 1980

On 3 March 1951, the 177th arrived in Leningrad Oblast from China with the division and became part of the 50th Fighter Aviation Army, stationed at Levashovo. It transferred to the 20th Fighter Aviation Division at Gromovo in early 1956. In 1960, the regiment relocated to Lodeynoye Pole, receiving new Sukhoi Su-9 interceptors to provide air defense for Leningrad against NATO aircraft. After the 20th IAD disbanded in 1961, the 177th joined the 18th Air Defense Corps of the 6th Independent Air Defense Army. From 1980, it was successively re-equipped with Mikoyan-Gurevich MiG-23M, MiG-23ML, and MiG-23MLD fighters. The regiment became part of the 54th Air Defense Corps of the 6th Independent Air Defense Army in 1986 and then the 6th Air and Air Defense Forces Army in 1998. In November 1990, according to CFE Treaty data, the regiment had 38 MiG-23MLD aircraft. Following the dissolution of the Soviet Union on 26 December 1991, the regiment became part of the new Russian Air Defense Forces. Between 1993 and 1994, it was re-equipped with Sukhoi Su-27 fighters. On 1 January 2000, the regiment fielded 29 Su-27s, according to CFE Treaty data. On 25 December 2002, the regiment received the honorific "Moscow" in honor of its air defense of the capital during World War II.

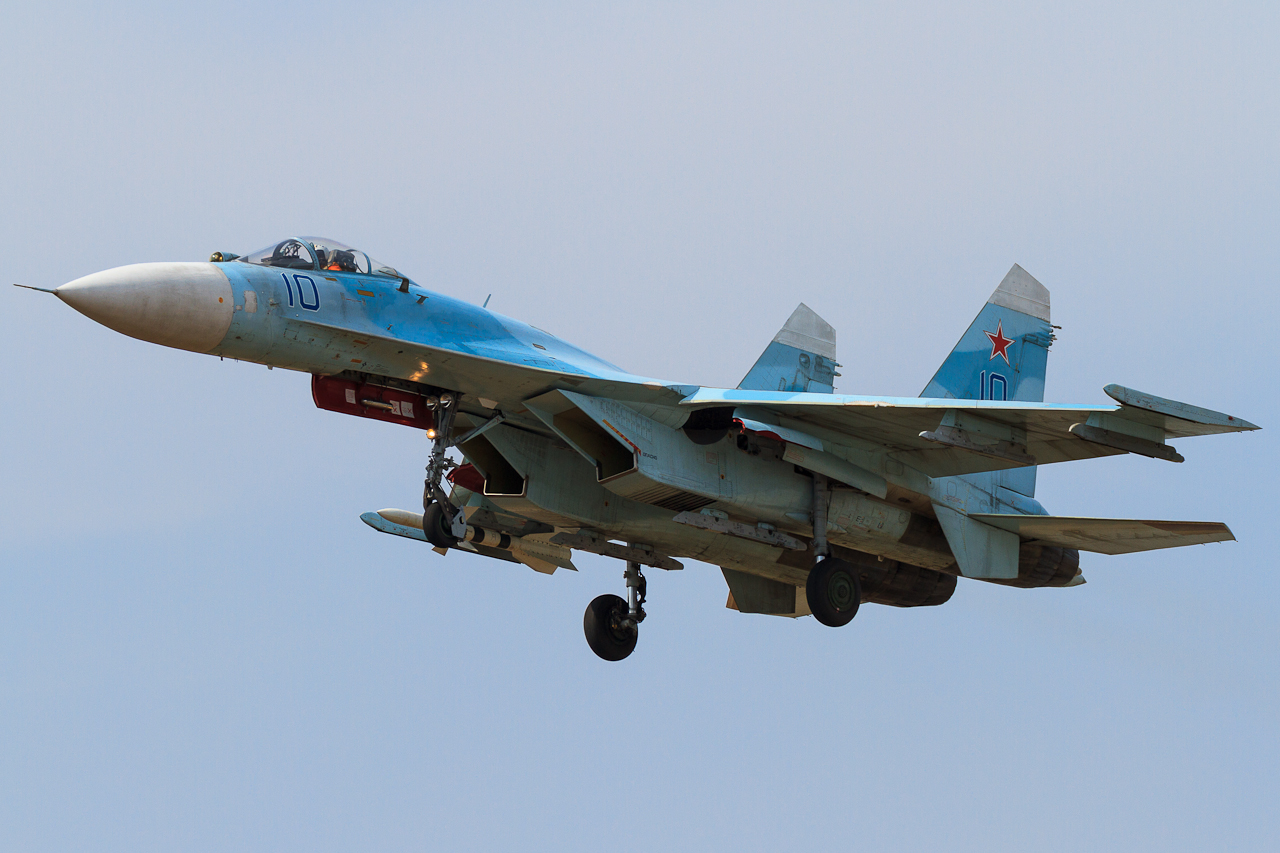
An Su-27 of the type flown by the regiment from 1993 to 2009

On 15 September 2005, 177th IAP deputy squadron commander Major Valery Troyanov crashed his Su-27 into a field in western Lithuania while flying to Kaliningrad Oblast for a training exercise alongside six fighters, beginning an international incident. Troyanov had lost contact with the other aircraft and Russian ground control, straying 200 kilometers (120 mi) from the planned route into Lithuanian airspace and remaining there for 20 minutes. The aircraft was briefly picked up and lost multiple times by obsolete Lithuanian radar, and two German Air Force McDonnell Douglas F-4 Phantom IIs, based in Lithuania as part of NATO's Baltic Air Policing deployment, sortied to intercept it. After running out of fuel, Troyanov ejected from his aircraft before it crashed; the F-4s did not intercept the aircraft until it had already nosedived. Troyanov was questioned by Lithuanian officials conducting an investigation into the circumstances of the crash and repatriated to Russia in October at the conclusion of the investigation.

A warehouse fire sparked by a cigarette butt at Lodeynoye Pole destroyed a hundred air-to-air missiles belonging to the regiment in May 2008, resulting in damage worth 766.3 million rubles. In late 2009, the 177th was disbanded during the reform of the Russian Air Force.

== Aircraft operated ==
Aircraft operated by 177th IAP PVO, data from:
From	To	Aircraft	Version
July 1941	c. September 1941	Polikarpov I-16	
c. September 1941	1944	Mikoyan-Gurevich MiG-3	
1944	1948	Supermarine Spitfire	Spitfire Mark IX
December 1948	1950	Mikoyan-Gurevich MiG-9	
March 1950	1960	Mikoyan-Gurevich MiG-15	MiG-15bis
1960	1980	Sukhoi Su-9	
1980	1993–1994	Mikoyan-Gurevich MiG-23	MiG23M, MiG-23ML, MiG-23MLD
1993–1994	2009	Sukhoi Su-27	
