= Ğadel Qutuy =

Tatar poet

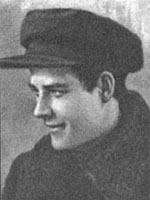
Ğadel Qutuy (1920s).

Ğadel Qutuy (Ğadelşa Nurmöxəmmət ulı Qutuyev, Tatar Cyrillic: Гаделша Нурмөхәммәт улы Кутуев; Russian: Адельша́ Нурмухаме́дович Куту́ев, lit. 'Adelsha Nurmuhamedovich Kutuyev'; frequently anglicized as Adel Kutuy; 28 November 1903 Tatarskie Kynady, Kuznetsky Uyezd, Saratov Governorate Russian Empire – 15 June 1945 Zgierz, Poland) was a Soviet Tatar poet, writer and playwright.

== Life ==
Qutuy moved to Kazan in 1922, and would gain recognition in 1927 as one of the five most prominent Tatar writers. Impressed by Mayakovsky, he established a Tatar analogue of the LEF, known as the SULF, i.e. Sul Front – Left Front. In 1930, after Cidegän affair was concocted, he was imprisoned. However, he would be found not guilty and was released after 8 month of trial. After this, he wrote his most prominent novels. In 1941 he volunteered to join the Red Army to fight against Nazi Germany in World War II. In 1944 he became a war correspondent, and in March 1945 would pass away from a cold.

== Legacy ==
His early verses, such as published in Könnär yögergändä (When the Days Fly, 1924) contributed to futurism. A poem Talantlar watanı (The Birthplace of the Talents, 1937), novels Soltannıñ ber köne (One day of the Life of Soltan, 1938), Wocdan ğazabı (The Torments of Conscience, 1939) are about role of intelligentsia in society. The most prominent writing of Qutuy is a lyrical novel Tapşırılmağan xatlar (Letters, which were not sent, 1936). He also wrote a science-fiction Röstäm macaraları (The Adventures of Röstäm, 1945). Qutuy wrote several plays: Baldızqay (Sister-in-law, 1926), Qazan (The Cauldron, 1927), Cawap, (Answer, 1929). The complete publishing of his writings issued after his death include Publitsistika (1957) and İlham (1982).

His son, Rustem Qutuy, is a Russian-language writer and resides in Kazan.

There is a street in Kazan named after him.
