= Arkhip Ruchkin =

Soviet Army lieutenant general

Arkhip Ivanovich Ruchkin
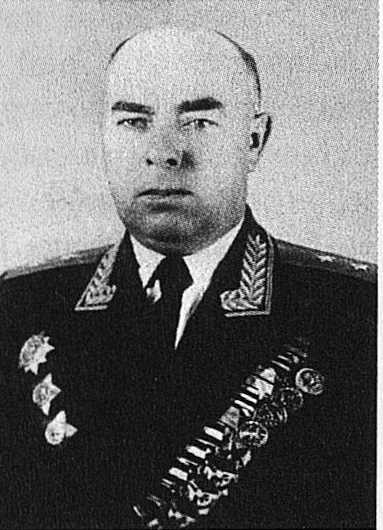
- Born: 19 September 1898; Nizovka, Balashovsky Uyezd, Saratov Governorate, Russian Empire
- Died: 8 November 1979 (aged 81) Moscow, Soviet Union
- Allegiance: Russian Empire; Soviet Union
- Branch: Imperial Russian Army; Red Army (Soviet Army from 1946)
- Service years: 1917; 1918–1961
- Rank: Lieutenant general
- Commands: 31st Guards Rifle Corps; 22nd Guards Rifle Corps; 2nd Guards Rifle Corps
- Conflicts: World War I; Russian Civil War; Polish–Soviet War; World War II
- Awards: Order of Lenin

Arkhip Ivanovich Ruchkin (Russian: Архип Иванович Ручкин; 19 September 1898 – 8 November 1979) was a Soviet Army lieutenant general who held corps commands during World War II.

A veteran of World War I and the Russian Civil War, Ruchkin rose through a series of command and staff positions during the interwar period. He held high-level staff roles during World War II until early 1944. He commanded the 31st Guards Rifle Corps and 22nd Guards Rifle Corps in 1944 and 1945. Postwar, Ruchkin held a series of senior postings until retirement in the early 1960s.

== Early life, World War I and Russian Civil War ==
Arkhip Ivanovich Ruchkin was born in a peasant family on 19 September 1898 in the village of Nizovka, Balashovsky Uyezd, Saratov Governorate. He graduated from the village school in 1910, working in the village and at a factory in Zlatoust. He was conscripted into the Imperial Russian Army during World War I in February 1917, fighting as a ryadovoy on the Romanian Front. Ruchkin fell sick in October and was sent to a hospital. After treatment Ruchkin returned to his home village.

His service in the Red Army began in September 1918 during the Russian Civil War, as a Red Army man in the local Volsk Reserve Battalion. Ruchkin was later transferred to Emergency Blocking Detachment No. 2 of the 9th Army Special Department. He was sent to the Southern Front in June 1919, serving as a platoon commander in the 201st Rifle Regiment and as a junior commander and platoon commander in the 473rd Border Regiment in the fighting against the White Armed Forces of South Russia. In April 1920 he was transferred to command a platoon at the Oryol Infantry Courses. Ruchkin was sent to the 2nd Moscow Brigade of Cadets when the courses were mobilized in June, taking part in the fighting on the Southern Front against the Army of Wrangel, the fighting in Estonia and the Polish–Soviet War.

== Interwar period ==
Ruchkin returned to the Oryol Infantry Courses in August 1920 as a cadet and platoon commander, holding the same positions in the 7th Armavir Infantry Courses. Upon graduation from the latter in July 1921, he remained at the courses as a platoon commander. Ruchkin entered the recurring courses at the Higher Combined Military School of the Western Front in September 1922. After completing the courses in April 1923, he was posted to the 11th Rifle Regiment of the 4th Rifle Division of the Belorussian Military District, serving as a platoon commander, assistant chief of the machine gun detachment, and assistant chief of the machine gun company. During May and June 1924 he served as chief of the machine gun detachment of the 5th Corps School for Training of Junior Command Personnel. Graduating from the Vystrel courses in 1928, Ruchkin was transferred to the 23rd Rifle Regiment of the 8th Rifle Division in May 1929, serving as a machine gun company commander and assistant regimental chief of staff.

Ruchkin was accepted to the Frunze Military Academy for advanced command training in April 1931, and on graduation in 1934 was appointed chief of staff of the 103rd Rifle Regiment of the 35th Rifle Division, stationed in the Soviet Far East with the Special Red Banner Far Eastern Army. He was transferred to the army headquarters in February 1935, where he served as assistant chief of the 3rd Section, senior assistant chief of the 1st Section of the 1st (Operations) Department, and chief of the 3rd Section of the Operations Department. Ruchkin returned to the Frunze Military Academy as a general tactics instructor in October 1938, and in April 1941 became an instructor in the Staff Services Department of the academy.

== World War II ==
After the German invasion of the Soviet Union began, Ruchkin remained at the academy. He was appointed chief of the Operations Department of the Operational Group of the Defense Line of the Oryol Military District in October 1941. From February 1942, he served as assistant and senior assistant chief of the Operations Department of the Western Axis, and in May became senior assistant chief of the Operations Department of the Western Front. In June of that year Ruchkin was transferred to the post of deputy chief of the front Operations Department for the auxiliary command post. From September to April 1943, he served as officer for special assignments of the Deputy Supreme Commander-in-Chief of the Red Army Georgy Zhukov during the destruction of the encircled German troops in the Battle of Stalingrad. Serving in this role with the Voronezh Front, from January 1943, Ruchkin took part in the preparation and conduct of the Ostrogozhsk–Rossosh offensive, the Voronezh–Kastornoye offensive, and the Kharkov offensive operation. Promoted to major general on 19 January, Ruchkin was appointed general for special assignments of the Red Army General Staff in April, taking part in the preparation and conduct of the Donbass and Melitopol offensives of the Southern and Southwestern Fronts later in the year.

Ruchkin took command of the 31st Guards Rifle Corps of the 46th Army of the 3rd Ukrainian Front on 8 February 1944. He led the corps in the Nikopol–Krivoi Rog offensive, the Bereznegovatoye–Snigirevka offensive, and the Odessa Offensive. For his performance in the Nikopol–Krivoi Rog offensive, Ruchkin was awarded the Order of Bogdan Khmelnitsky, 2nd class, on 19 March 1944. The recommendation read:

Major General Ruchkin, commanding the corps during the breakthrough of the enemy defenses in the region of Sofiyevka and the subsequent offensive operations, showed himself to be a brave, strong-willed commander, correctly assessing the situation, rapidly and boldly making decisions.

Carrying out the objectives assigned by the command, with skillful maneuvers, skillfully using infantry in cooperation with other branches, imposing his will on the enemy, all the time pressing him to the west and inflicting heavy blows.

Routing the fascist hordes, the corps from 21 January to 10 February liberated 49 settlements, including the district center of Apostolovo, killed 4,901 soldiers and officers, took 457 men prisoner, destroyed 79 guns of different calibers, 74 tanks, 66 armored vehicles, 1,693 vehicles. During the same period it captured trophies: 1,274 rifles and submachine guns, 166 machine guns, 285 guns of different calibers, twenty motorcycles, ten radios, sixteen tanks, four armored vehicles, 2,318 vehicles, 160 tractors, and 63 different depots.

During the entire period of the pursuit of the enemy, driving him to the west, the corps in cooperation with other formations of the 46th Army took by storm on 22 February 1944 the large industrial center of Ukraine - the city of Krivoy Rog.

For his skillful conduct of offensive operations, inflicting of great losses in personnel and equipment on the enemy, liberation of the major population center of Apostolovo and industrial center of Ukraine - the city of Krivoy Rog, Major General Ruchkin is deserving of the award of the Order of Bogdan Khmelnitsky, 2nd class.

After the corps' divisions reached the Dniester at the end of the Odessa Offensive, Ruchkin's troops failed to overcome German resistance at Chebruchi on 14 April. In secondary attacks in late April, the corps was tasked with taking Chebruchi in the army's main attack, but Ruchkin's drive failed as soon as it began.

Ruchkin was transferred north, taking command of the 22nd Guards Rifle Corps of the 43rd Army of the 1st Baltic Front on 27 May. Ruchkin led the corps in the Vitebsk–Orsha offensive, the Polotsk offensive, the Šiauliai offensive, and the Rezhitsa–Dvinsk offensive. In late June, during the Vitebsk–Orsha Offensive, the units of the corps broke through the German defenses northwest of Vitebsk and advanced 20 to 40 kilometers in two days, reaching the Western Dvina. During the subsequent Polotsk offensive, the corps took the rail junction city of Polotsk by storm. For his performance in these operations, Ruchkin was awarded the Order of Suvorov, 2nd class on 19 September. The recommendation read:

Guards Major General Ruchkin has commanded the 22nd Guards Rifle Corps since 27 May 1944.

In a short period he managed to prepare the units of the corps for offensive battles.

Under his command, the corps, including the 51st, 47th, and 90th Guards Rifle Divisions and support units, taking part in the general offensive of the army, on the right flank northwest of Vitebsk, went over to the offensive on 22 June 1944.

The units of the corps broke through the fortified, deeply echeloned defense of the enemy and in five days moved up to 25 kilometers in bitter fighting, liberating 131 settlements and the railroad stations of Lovsha and Obol. In bitter fighting it took the four-highway junction of Rovnoye, having important significance in forested and swampy terrain conditions. This cut the rail and highway lines from Vitebsk to Polotsk and the Vitebsk-Lepel highway.

The corps inflicted a major defeat on the Polotsk group of the enemy, destroying up to 5,300 soldiers and officers of the enemy, a large amount of equipment and taking up to 200 prisoners. Repeated enemy counterattacks from 24 to 27 June, with the goal of restoring their positions, were successfully beaten back. The corps swiftly pursued the retreating enemy.

For skillful command of the corps in the breakthrough of the enemy defensive zone, quick organization of the pursuit, and displaying in this courage and urgency, Guards Major General Ruchkin is deserving of the award of the Order of Suvorov, 2nd class.

The corps seized Zarasai during the Šiauliai offensive as part of the 6th Guards Army and subsequently fought its way to the Mūša river in the region west of Biržai. Ruchkin was promoted to the rank of lieutenant general on 13 September.

He was moved up to acting deputy commander of the 4th Shock Army of the front in December 1944, taking part in the preparation and conduct of offensive battles on the Venta river and near Memel. Ruchkin returned to command the 22nd Guards Rifle Corps, by then part of the 10th Guards Army of the 2nd Baltic Front, in February 1945. The corps was shifted to the 6th Guards Army of the Leningrad Front in April. In this position Ruchkin took part in the operations against the Courland Pocket until the end of the war.

== Postwar ==
After the end of the war, Ruchkin continued to command the 22nd Guards Rifle Corps until October 1945, then was appointed deputy commander of the Baltic Military District for military training institutions. He was placed in command of the 2nd Guards Rifle Corps of the district in December 1946. Completing the Higher Academic Courses at the Voroshilov Higher Military Academy between June 1950 and August 1951, Ruchkin was appointed assistant commander-in-chief of the Central Group of Forces upon graduation. He served as general-inspector of combined arms formations of the Main Inspectorate of the Soviet Ministry of Defense from June 1954, and from April 1955 was deputy general-inspector of the Ground Forces Inspectorate. From June 1956, Ruchkin served as senior military advisor to the commander of a military district of the East German National People's Army. Ruchkin returned to the Soviet Union in March 1959 to serve as a senior instructor in the operational art department of the Military Academy of the General Staff, his last post before being retired in January 1961. He died in Moscow on 8 November 1979.

== Awards ==
Ruchkin was a recipient of the following awards:

- Order of Lenin
- Order of the Red Banner (3)
- Order of Suvorov, 2nd class (2)
- Order of Bogdan Khmelnitsky, 2nd class
