= Viktor Talalikhin =

Soviet lieutenant (1918–1941)

Viktor Vasilievich Talalikhin
- Виктор Васильевич Талалихин
- Born: 18 September 1918; Teplovka, Volsky Uyezd, Saratov Governorate, RSFSR
- Died: 27 October 1941 (aged 23) near Podolsk, Moscow Oblast, Soviet Union
- Burial place: Novodevichy Cemetery
- Military career
- Allegiance: Soviet Union
- Branch: Soviet Air Defense Forces
- Service years: 1938–1941
- Rank: Junior lieutenant
- Unit: 177th Fighter Aviation Regiment PVO
- Conflicts: World War II; Winter War; Eastern Front †
- Awards: Hero of the Soviet Union; Order of Lenin; Order of the Red Banner; Order of the Red Star

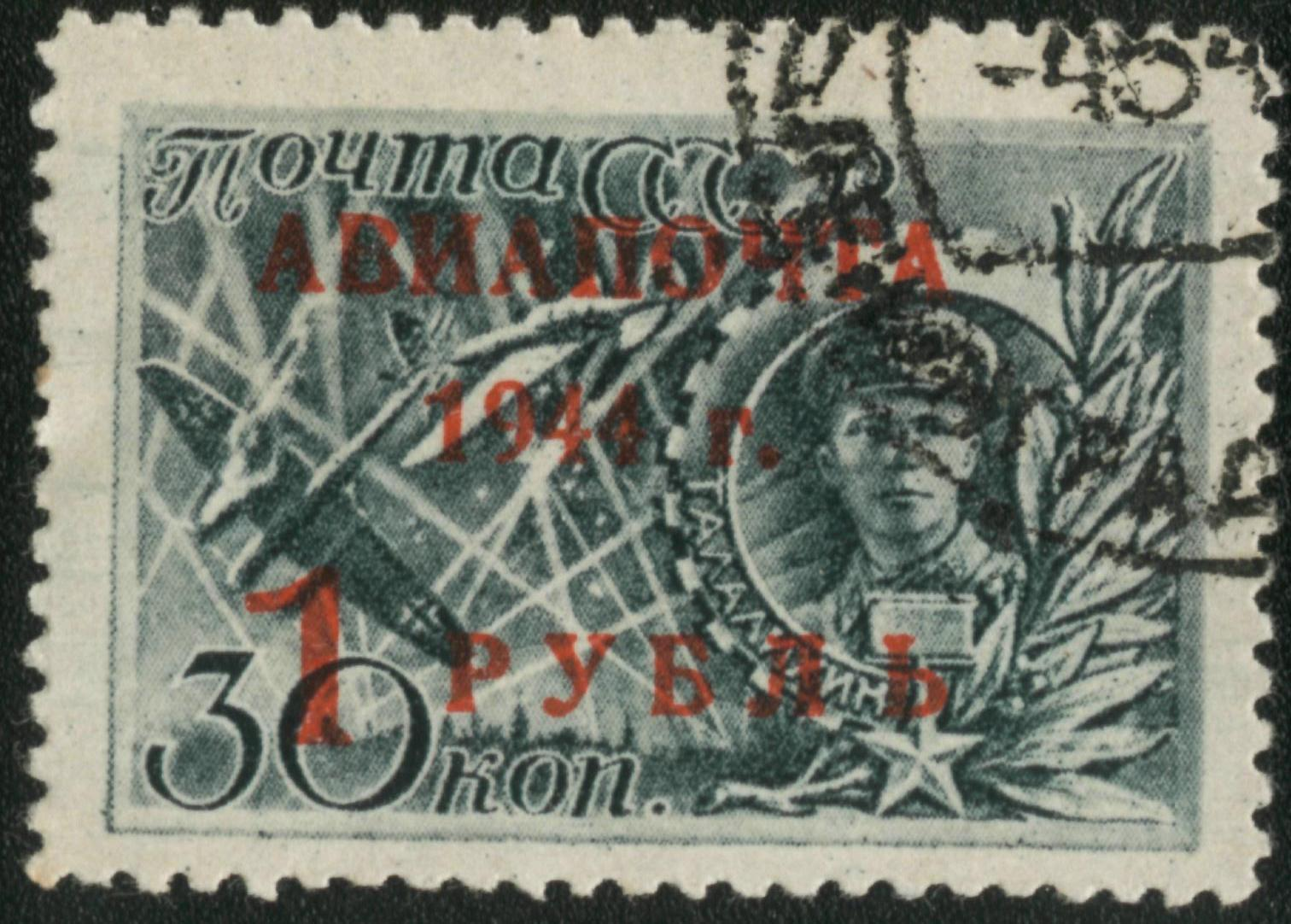
1943 Soviet postage stamp depicting Talalikhin's ramming

Viktor Vasilevich Talalikhin (Russian: Виктор Васильевич Талалихин; 18 September 1918 – 27 October 1941) was a Soviet lieutenant and aviator during the Winter War and World War II and a Hero of the Soviet Union, among the first to perform aerial ramming at night.

Talalikhin became a fighter pilot in the Soviet Air Forces in the late 1930s, flying the Polikarpov I-153 during the Winter War. He served in the air defense of Moscow during World War II with an aviation regiment of the Soviet Air Defence Forces. He became one of the first Soviet aviation heroes of the war after ramming a German bomber at night with his Polikarpov I-16, but was shot down and killed in late October while flying a Mikoyan-Gurevich MiG-3. Talalikhin claimed three victories during the Winter War and four in the air defense of Moscow.

== Early life and military career ==
Talalikhin was born on 18 September 1918 in the village of Teplovka in Saratov Governorate to a peasant family. In 1924, he and his family moved to Volsk, where he studied at its Secondary School No. 1. In the summer of 1933, Talalikhin and his family again moved to Moscow, where he graduated from the factory school of the Moscow Meat Processing Plant in 1934. Talalikhin worked at the plant from 1934 to 1937; he joined a factory gliding group in September 1935 and with a Komsomol direction took flying lessons at the Proletarsky District flying club. Talalikhin made his first solo flight in a Polikarpov U-2 in June 1937.

After joining the Red Army in December of that year, Talalikhin graduated from the 2nd Borisoglebsk Military Aviation School of Pilots in December 1938 as a Junior Lieutenant. He became a junior pilot in the 3rd Squadron of the 27th Fighter Aviation Regiment (IAP), part of the Air Forces of the Moscow Military District, flying the Polikarpov I-153 biplane. With the 27th IAP he fought in the Winter War of November 1939-March 1940, flying 47 sorties and claiming three individual victories in addition to one shared. For his actions, Talalikhin received the Order of the Red Star. In the spring of 1941, he graduated from courses for flight commanders, and joined the 177th Fighter Aviation Regiment PVO, then forming in the Moscow area, as a flight commander in its 1st Squadron.

== World War II ==
In 1941, during the first few weeks of fighting on the Eastern Front during World War II, he was first a flight commander, then the deputy commander of the 1st Squadron, flying with 177th Fighter Aviation Regiment PVO of the Soviet Air Defence Forces, providing air defense for Moscow. Talalikhin flew his first combat mission on 22 July.

He downed a Junkers Ju 88 on the night of 5–6 August. On the night of 6–7 August 1941, flying a Soviet Air Defense Forces Polikarpov I-16 fighter over Moscow, Talalikhin rammed a German Heinkel He 111 bomber after running out of ammunition, destroying both aircraft. Wounded by machine-gun fire from the German bomber, he parachuted to safety, landing in a small lake. He was reported as the first pilot in history to ram an enemy aircraft at night, and was feted in Moscow by Soviet media as the first major Soviet air hero of World War II. However, Pyotr Yeremeyev, another Moscow air defense pilot, had earlier performed the same feat on 29 July. On 8 August, Talalikhin was awarded the title Hero of the Soviet Union and the Order of Lenin. He soon became a squadron commander in the 177th.

Subsequently, Talalikhin began flying the Mikoyan-Gurevich MiG-3. On 27 October, he led a mixed group of two MiG-3s and six I-16s in an action over Podolsk, covering ground troops. Near the village of Kamenka, he descended to attack German positions, but the Soviet aircraft were ambushed by six Messerschmitt Bf 109 fighters attacking from a higher altitude. Talalikhin claimed two Messerschmitt Bf 109s before being shot down and killed by another.

His body was sent to Moscow and cremated, and on 23 February 1959 the urn with his ashes was moved to the Novodevichy Cemetery.

== Legacy ==
On 30 August 1948, Talalikhin was permanently added to the muster list of the 1st Squadron of the 177th Fighter Aviation Regiment. Monuments to him were built in Moscow and Podolsk, and an obelisk was placed at the 43rd kilometer of the Warsaw Highway, over which the ramming took place. Streets were named for Talalikhin in Moscow, Kaliningrad, Volgograd, Krasnoyarsk, Vladivostok, and Borisoglebsk.

Parts of the He 111 that he downed by ramming are displayed in the Central Armed Forces Museum. In June 2014, the wreckage of the I-16 that Talalikhin rammed the bomber in was discovered in a forest 20 kilometers from Moscow.
