= Vladimir Kabanov =

Soviet Air Force captain (1918–1977)

Vladimir Yegorovich Kabanov
- Владимир Егорович Кабанов
- Born: 22 August 1918; Bolshaya Zhuravka, Balashovsky Uyezd, Saratov Governorate, RSFSR
- Died: 17 August 1977 (aged 58); Krasnodar
- Military career
- Allegiance: Soviet Union
- Branch: Soviet Air Force
- Service years: 1939–58
- Rank: Captain
- Units: 7th Guards Attack Aviation Regiment, 230th Assault Aviation Division
- Conflicts: World War II; Kerch-Eltigen Operation; Crimean Offensive; Operation Bagration; East Pomeranian Offensive; Battle of Berlin
- Awards: Hero of the Soviet Union; Order of Lenin; Order of the Red Banner (2x); Order of the Patriotic War, 1st class Order of the Red Star (2x)

Vladimir Yegorovich Kabanov (Russian: Владимир Егорович Кабанов; 22 August 1918 – 17 August 1977) was a Soviet Air Force captain and Hero of the Soviet Union. Kabanov was awarded the title for flying 114 attack sorties during World War II. Kabanov continued to serve in the Soviet Air Force until his retirement in 1958. He worked as a goods manager in Krasnodar.

== Early life ==
Kabanov was born on 22 August 1918 in the village of Bolshaya Zhuravka in the Balashovsky Uyezd of Saratov Governorate. He graduated from seventh grade and then worked at an aluminum plant in Zaporizhia. Kabanov was drafted into the Red Army in 1939. He graduated from the Voroshilovgrad Military Pilots Aviation School in 1941.

== World War II ==
Kabanov fought in combat from October 1943. He became an Ilyushin Il-2 pilot in the 7th Guards Attack Aviation Regiment of the 230th Assault Aviation Division. In November 1943, he flew sorties during the Kerch–Eltigen Operation. On 14 November he was wounded in the leg. On 22 January 1944 he flew in a raid on trains on the Vladislavovka-Kolodez section of the railway in the Kerch area. During the mission, three trains were attacked and 21 cars were set on fire, of which one contained ammunition. For his actions Kabanov received thanks from the commander of the 4th Air Army. On 27 January, Kabanov flew in a sortie with three other Il-2s to attack German tanks in the area of Skosiyev-Fontan. During the mission a shell fragment hit the oil cooler of Kabanov's plane but he reportedly did not turn back until the mission was accomplished. On 30 January he was awarded the Order of the Red Star. In April and May 1944, Kabanov fought in the Crimean Offensive. On 15 June he was awarded the Order of the Patriotic War 1st class. After the end of the Crimean Offensive the 230th Division was transferred to fight in Operation Bagration. During the June and July 1944, Kabanov participated in the Mogilev Offensive and the Bialystok Offensive. On 20 July he was awarded the Order of the Red Banner. In August he fought in the Osovets Offensive. On 20 September he received a second Order of the Red Banner.

In 1945, Kabanov joined the Communist Party of the Soviet Union. From February 1945, Kabanov fought in the East Pomeranian Offensive. On 23 February he was awarded the title Hero of the Soviet Union and the Order of Lenin for completing 114 sorties by December 1944. In these sorties, Kabanov reportedly destroyed 19 tanks, 12 artillery batteries, 17 AA positions, 58 vehicles, 2 trains, 3 bridges, 60 carts, 5 warehouses. His sorties also reportedly killed up to 100 German troops. From April, he fought in the Berlin Offensive.

== Postwar ==
Kabanov graduated from the Krasnodar Higher Air Force Navigator Officers School in 1949. In 1954, he received a second Order of the Red Star. He retired in 1958 and graduated from the Krasnodar Institute of Soviet Trade. He worked as a goods manager at the Krasnodar branch of the Russian Shoe Trade Association. He lived in Krasnodar and died on 17 August 1977. Kabanov was buried in Krasnodar.

== Personal life ==
Kabanov married Yulia Mikhailovna. He had at least one child.
