= Moscow Air Defense Front =

- Active: 5 April 1942 – 29 June 1943
- Country: Soviet Union
- Branch: National Air Defense Forces
- Type: Air defense front
- Garrison/HQ: Moscow
- Engagements: World War II

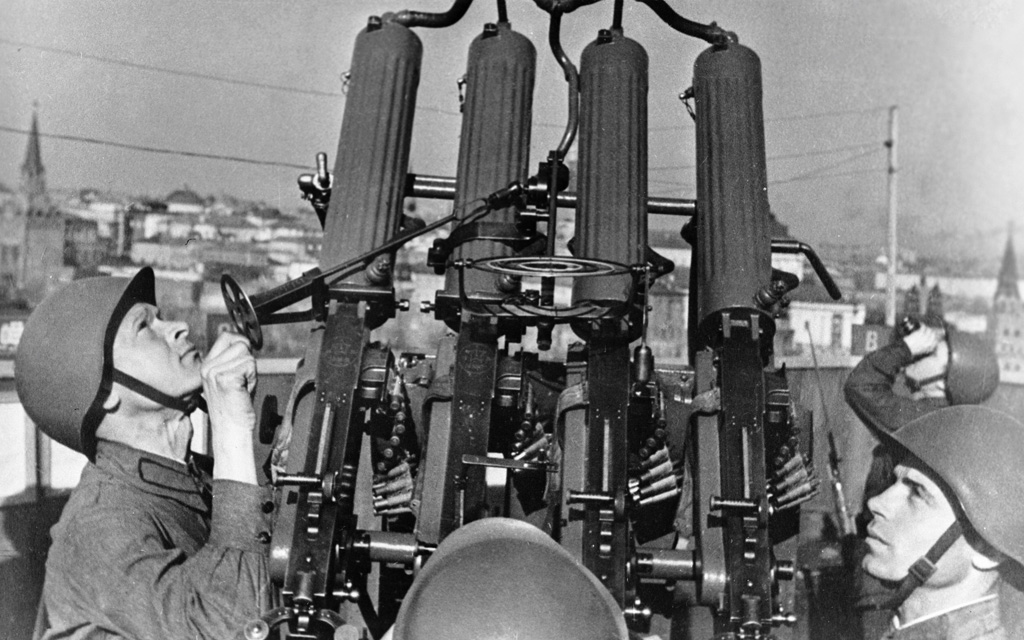
Anti-aircraft gunners readying a machine gun for combat

The Moscow Air Defense Front (Russian: Московский фронт ПВО) was an air defense front of the National Air Defense Forces, responsible for the air defense of Moscow during World War II. It was formed in April 1942 in response to predictions of a German bomber concentration against Moscow, and its units were used to cover troops and rear areas on the front after the halting of German air raids against that city. In June 1943 it was reorganized as the Special Moscow Air Defense Army.

== History ==
The front was formed by an order of 5 April 1942 from the Moscow Air Defense Corps Region to provided air defense for Moscow and other key facilities in the Central industrial region, under the command of Lieutenant General Daniil Zhuravlyov. With its headquarters in that city, the front was the first such formation of its name and scope to be created, in response to a perceived increase in the strength of the German Luftwaffe forces against Moscow, specifically the movement of ten squadrons and detachments of bombers. An order of 6 April stipulated its composition and ordered its formation to be completed by 10 April. It was responsible for the same area as the Moscow Air Defense Corps Region along the line of Kovrov, Yuryev-Polsky, Kashin, Nosilovo, Kalinin, Staritsa, Rzhev, Dobraya, Yukhnov, Tarusa, Serpukhov, Kashira, Zaraysk, Ryazan, and Kasizmov, forming a ring around Moscow.

It included the 6th Fighter Aviation Corps (IAK) with 23 fighter aviation regiments stationed at eight aviation base areas, thirteen anti-aircraft artillery regiments, thirteen separate anti-aircraft artillery battalions, three anti-aircraft machine gun regiments, three anti-aircraft searchlight regiments, two of which were formed, two regiments of the VNOS (Air Observation, Warning, and Communications Service), two aerostat regiments, separate communications battalions, and training units. These forces totaled 500 fighter aircraft, 1,560 anti-aircraft guns, 430 anti-aircraft machine guns, 1,300 searchlights, and 1,060 barrage balloons.

The creation of the front was credited with improving the air defense command and control system. In mid-1942 the fighter regiments of the 6th IAK were moved to aerodromes that allowed them to intercept German bombers approaching the city. An increase in the number of anti-aircraft artillery regiments and batteries allowed a consolidation of units to directly defend the capital, and the creation of a stronger ring around it. Beginning in July, the mass German air raids on Moscow ceased. This freed up the units of the front to cover the communications, supply bases, and troops of the Northwestern, Kalinin, Western, and Bryansk Fronts of the army. Its forces were subsequently used in the spring of 1943 to defend the troops and rear area of the Central and Voronezh Fronts in the Kursk area.

In May and June 1943, the front was reorganized. In accordance with an order of 21 May the units of the front were used to form the 1st Fighter Air Army PVO, fifteen anti-aircraft artillery divisions, four searchlight divisions, three anti-aircraft machine gun divisions, two VNOS divisions, and four aerostat divisions, as well as five anti-aircraft artillery regiments, thirteen separate anti-aircraft artillery battalions, three anti-aircraft machine gun battalions, a communications regiment, and a VNOS battalion. As a result of the reorganization, on 29 June the front was redesignated as the Special Moscow Air Defense Army to become part of the newly created Western Air Defense Front.
