= Lodeynoye Pole (air base) =

Airport in Leningrad Oblast, Russia

Lodeynoye Pole
- Lodeynoye Pole, Leningrad Oblast in Russia
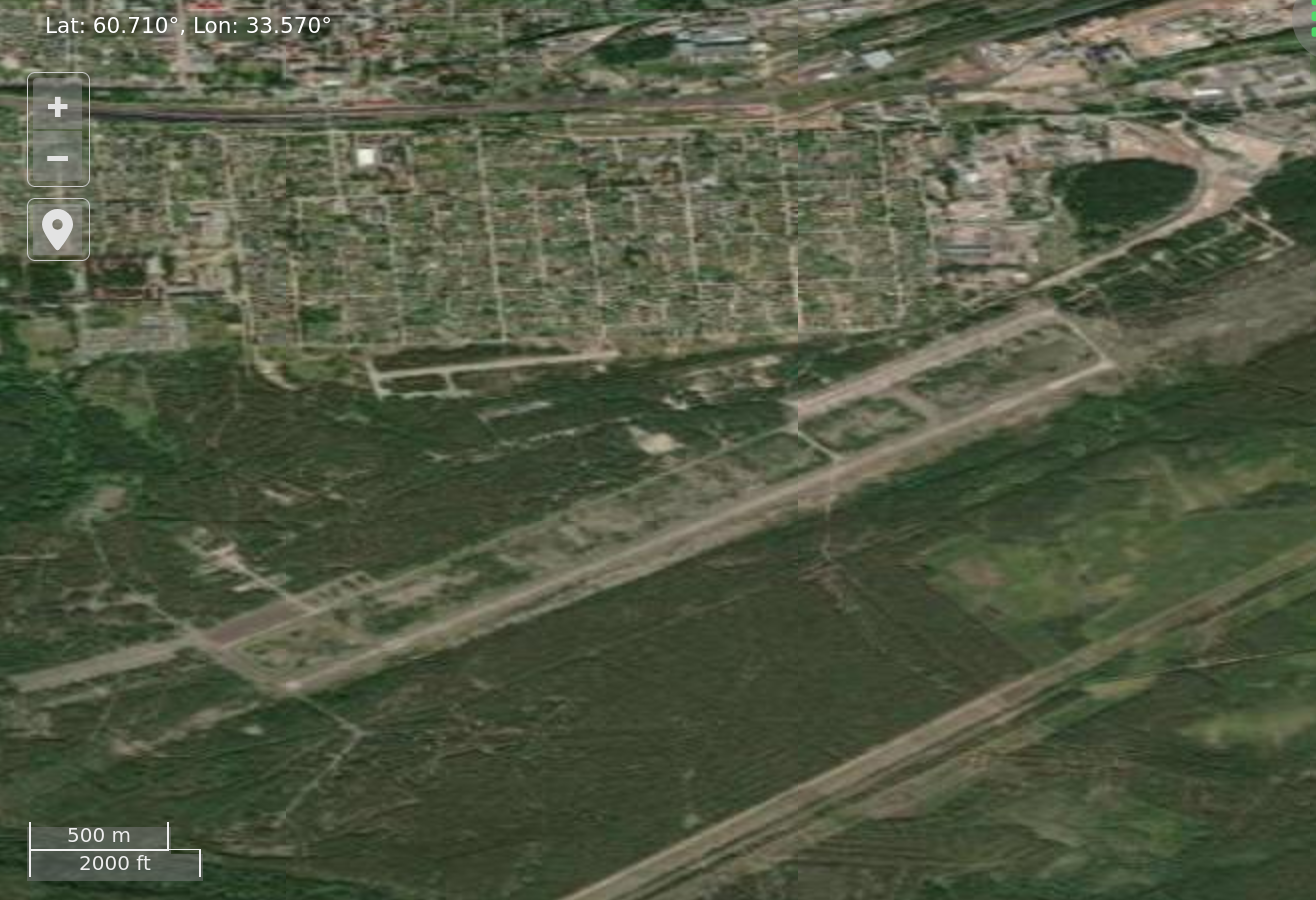
- Satellite imagery of the former Lodeynoye Pole airbase

Site information
- Type: Air Base
- Owner: Ministry of Defence
- Operator: Russian Air Force

Location
- Shown within Leningrad Oblast Lodeynoye Pole (Russia)
- Coordinates: 60°42′36″N 33°34′12″E

Site history
- Built: 1960
- In use: 1960 - 2013

Airfield information
- Identifiers: ICAO: XLPO
- Elevation: 17 metres (56 ft) AMSL
Runways
Direction	Length and surface
04/22	2,500 metres (8,202 ft) Concrete

Lodeynoye Pole (also Lodynoye Pole) is a former air base in Leningrad Oblast, Russia located 2 km south of Lodeynoye Pole. It was home to the 177th Fighter Aviation Regiment PVO between 1960 and 2009.

Lodeynoye Pole initially operated the Sukhoi Su-9 (ASCC: Fishpot) in the 1960s and 1970s. The regiment replaced it in 1980 with the Mikoyan-Gurevich MiG-23P (ASCC: Flogger-G).

Around 1994 the MiG-23 was upgraded to the Sukhoi Su-27 (ASCC: Flanker).

On December 1, 2009, the 177th IAP was disbanded. Aircraft fit for service have been redeployed to other airfields. Until September 6, 2013, the military commandant's office was responsible for guarding the airfield.

In Lodeynoye Pole, next to the military airfield, there is an asphalt runway of the former airfield of the regional aviation of the Civil Air Fleet of the USSR. Currently, this airfield is not operational and is gradually being destroyed and overgrown with young pine trees. There is an operating weather station on its territory.

== See also ==
- List of military airbases in Russia
