= 1st Fighter Air Defense Army =

- Active: June 1943–after May 1945
- Country: Soviet Union
- Branch: National Air Defense Forces
- Type: Air defense army
- Garrison/HQ: Moscow
- Engagements: World War II

The 1st Fighter Air Defense Army (Russian: 1-я воздушная истребительная армия ПВО) was an air army of the National Air Defense Forces during World War II, responsible for the air defense of Moscow. Formed in June 1943 from the 6th Fighter Aviation Corps PVO, the army was disbanded during the postwar reorganization of the Air Defense Forces.

== History ==
The army was formed in June 1943 from the 6th Fighter Aviation Corps PVO, tasked with the air defense of Moscow and nearby facilities, under the command of Major General Alexander Borman. It initially included four fighter aviation divisions with a total of seventeen fighter aviation regiments and support units. Part of the Moscow Air Defense Front, the army was directly subordinate to the Special Moscow Air Defense Army until the reorganization of the latter in December 1944. Major General Alexey Mitenkov became army commander in April 1944. By the end of the war, the army expanded to include the Leningrad fighter aviation corps, three fighter aviation divisions defending Moscow, and one fighter division each defending Arkhangelsk, Murmansk, and Gorky. It was successively part of the Moscow, Western, Northern, and Central Air Defense Fronts. Mitenkov was replaced by Lieutenant General Serafim Pestov in March 1945; the latter led the army until after the end of the war.

The army was disbanded soon after the end of the war in May 1945 when the air defense forces were reorganized. It became the 19th Fighter Air Defence Army on 1 February 1946; the 78th Fighter Air Defence Army in February 1949; the 64th Fighter Air Defence Army in October 1949; the 52nd Air Defence Army in February 1952; and was disbanded finally in March 1960. It was four air defence corps strong in 1949, 1952, and 1955, though a further Guards Fighter Aviation Division had been added by 1955.
