= Petrovsky Uyezd =

Administrative division of Russian Empire

Petrovsky Uyezd (Петровский уезд) was one of the subdivisions of the Saratov Governorate of the Russian Empire. It was situated in the northern part of the governorate. Its administrative centre was Petrovsk.

== Demographics ==
At the time of the Russian Empire Census of 1897, Petrovsky Uyezd had a population of 222,070. Of these, 72.4% spoke Russian, 20.0% Mordvin, 5.6% Tatar, 1.0% Chuvash, 0.6% Bashkir, 0.2% German and 0.1% Ukrainian as their native language.
