= Street Ğädel Qutuy =

Street in Sovetsky City District, Kazan, Russia

Coordinates: 55.7848°N 49.1824°E

Street Ğädel Qutuy is a highway in the city of Kazan, Republic of Tatarstan, Russia. It is named in the honor of Tatar writer, poet and playwright Ğädel Qutuy. The highway connects the eastern part (residential areas and a network of hypermarkets) with the central part of the city. The highway runs from north-west to south-east.

== Geography ==
Residential, business, public, commercial buildings as well as garage complexes line the street. Residential buildings display a multitude of architectural styles - from Stalin-era stalinka to contemporary styles. Construction is ongoing, replacing dilapidated houses by high-rise residential buildings. The industrial area near the street has been proposed as a zone of high-intensity use for high-tech enterprises, scientific and industrial complexes, business functions, and facilities maintenance.

== Buildings ==
- Republican Medical Information and Analytical Center
- Interschool educational combine
- Medtech, the Kazan plant, JSC
