= Sidor Slyusarev =

Soviet general (1906–1981)

Sidor Vasilievich Slyusarev
- Сидор Васильевич Слюсарев
- Born: 14 May 1906; Tiflis, Russian Empire
- Died: 11 December 1981 (aged 75); Monino, Moscow Oblast, Russian SFSR, USSR
- Military career
- Allegiance: Soviet Union
- Branch: Soviet Air Force
- Service years: 1928–1964
- Rank: Lieutenant General
- Conflicts: Second Sino-Japanese War; World War II; Winter War; Eastern Front; Korean War
- Awards: Hero of the Soviet Union

Sidor Vasilievich Slyusarev (Russian: Сидор Васильевич Слюсарев; 14 May 1906 – 11 December 1981) was a Lieutenant general in the Soviet Air Force and recipient of the title Hero of the Soviet Union.

== Early life ==
Slyusarev was born on 14 May 1906 in Tiflis. After graduation from high school, he worked as an assistant foreman at the Tiflis Mechanical Artillery Plant.

He joined the Red Army in June 1928. On the same year, he entered the Leningrad Military-Theoretical School of the Red Army Air Force. After graduation, he was sent to receive practical skills at the 1st Military Pilot School named after A.F. Myasnikov.

== Military career ==
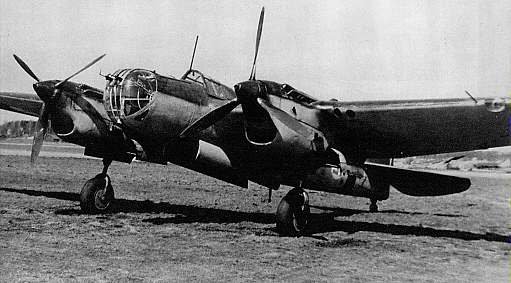
Tupolev SB

After graduating in 1930, he remained at this school as an instructor pilot. From July 1933, he served as flight commander in the 14th Air Brigade of the Air Force of Baltic Fleet. Slyusarev later served in the 26th Air Brigade of the Air Force of the Trans-Baikal Group of Forces of the Special Red Banner Far Eastern Army in Nerchinsk from March 1934. In January 1937, he was appointed to the 57th Cruising Aviation Squadron of the 2nd Air Brigade in Nerchinsk. In the latter, he was soon appointed an instructor pilot, and then squadron commander. From March 1938, he commanded the 4th Aviation Squadron.

Slyusarev served with the Soviet Volunteer Group in China, during the Second Sino-Japanese War. From May 1938 to March 1939, he flew 12 missions in a Tupolev SB bomber and was credited in the destruction of 70 ships and 30 enemy aircraft on the ground. He also provided training for Chinese pilots.

By the decree of the Presidium of the Supreme Soviet of the USSR of February 22, 1939 "for the exemplary fulfillment of special tasks of the Government to strengthen the defensive power of the Soviet Union and for the displayed heroism", Slyusarev was awarded the title of Hero of the Soviet Union.

After returning from China in May 1939, he was appointed deputy commander of the 2nd Special Air Force in Voronezh. From November 1939 to January 1940, he studied at the courses of the highest command personnel at the Academy of the General Staff of the Red Army. After his graduation from January 1940, he took part in the Winter War as Deputy Commander of the Air Force of the 8th Air Army and personally flew on combat missions. After the end of the war in May 1940, he was appointed deputy commander of the Air Force of the Leningrad Military District.

From July 1940, he served as commander of the 4th Aviation Division, during which he participated in the Soviet occupation of the Baltic States. In August 1940, he served as deputy commander of Air Force of the Kiev Special Military District.

=== Great Patriotic War ===
Following the outbreak of Operation Barbarossa, Slyusarev became deputy commander of the Air Force of the Southwestern Front, which was created on the basis of the Kiev Special Military District. He led the front air force in the border battles and in first Battle of Kiev. In September 1941, he was appointed commander of the 142nd Air Defense Fighter Aviation Division, which was part of the Gorky Air Defense Corps Region. During this time, he oversaw the aerial defense of the city from German air raids. In March 1943, he was appointed commander of the 5th Mixed Aviation Corps, which in June was reorganized into the 7th Fighter Aviation Corps.

From July 1943, he served as deputy commander of the Air Army, first the 4th Air Army on the North Caucasian Front and from April 1944, the 2nd Air Army on the 1st Ukrainian Front. During this period, he participated in the Novorossiysko-Taman, Kerch-Eltigen, Proskurovsko-Chernivtsi and Lvov–Sandomierz offensives. In August 1944, he was again appointed commander of the 1st Mixed Aviation Corps, which later became the 2nd Guards Assault Aviation Corps on September, of the 2nd Air Army. Under his command, the corps took part in East Carpathian, Vistula-Oder, Lower Silesian, Upper Silesian, Berlin and Prague offensives.

For his successful operations, he was noted 11 times in the orders of the Supreme Commander-in-Chief Joseph Stalin.

=== Post war ===
Till January 1946, he continued to command the 2nd Guards Attack Aviation Corps. In April 1946, he was appointed commander of the 7th Bomber Aviation Corps of the 1st Air Army. From October 1947, he served as commander of the 12th Air Army of the Transbaikal Military District.

From February to December 1950, he was assigned to China, where he carried out missions for the air defense of Shanghai from the Nationalist ROCAF air raids operating from bases in Taiwan, and training Chinese pilots, for which he was awarded a third Order of the Red Banner. In December 1950, he studied at the Voroshilov Higher Military Academy from which he graduated in August 1952.

At the request of the commander-in-chief of the Soviet Air Force, at the end of 1952, he was again sent to China, where he was appointed deputy commander of the 64th Fighter Aviation Corps. Parts of the fighter corps were stationed at airfields in Northeast China and fought actively against the U.S. Air Force, during the Korean War. From April 1953, he commanded the corps until the end of July 1953, following signing of the Korean Armistice Agreement. Following the cessation of hostilities, the corps returned to the USSR, where it became part of the 22nd Air Army in Petrozavodsk, Karelian ASSR.

From May 1955, he served in the Soviet Air Defence Forces, with assignments such as commander of the Ural Air Defense Army and deputy commander of the Ural Military District for the Air Defense Forces. From May 1957, he served in the staff of the commander-in-chief of the Air Defense Forces and from 1957, he served in the staff of the commander-in-chief of Soviet Air Force. From August 1957 to 1964, he was the head of the command department of the Air Force Academy. In 1964, he retired from active service.

== Later life ==
Slyusarev was married and had three children. His daughter Natalia is a well known Russian writer and son Anatoly is a professor at the Volga State University of Water Transport in Nizhny Novgorod.

From September 1964, he was in reserves and lived in Monino. He died on 11 December 1981 and is buried at Moninskoe Memorial Military Cemetery in Monino.

== Dates of rank ==
- Senior lieutenant, Red Air Force: March 14, 1936
- Captain, Red Air Force: April 29, 1938
- Colonel, Red Air Force: May 17, 1939
- Major general, Red Air Force: November 10, 1942
- Lieutenant general, Soviet Air Force: March 1, 1946

== Awards and decorations ==
Hero of the Soviet Union (22 February 1939)
Order of Lenin, thrice (22 February 1939, 29 May 1945, 3 November 1953)
Order of the Red Banner, four times (19 May 1940, 20 June 1949, 15 November 1950, 28 September 1953)
Order of Suvorov, 2nd class (25 August 1944)
Order of Kutuzov, 2nd class (16 May 1944)
Order of Bogdan Khmelnitsky, 2nd class (6 April 1945)
Order of the Red Star (3 November 1944)
Medal "For the Defence of Kiev" (1961)
Medal "For the Defence of the Caucasus" (1944)
Medal "For the Liberation of Prague" (1945)
Medal "For the Capture of Berlin" (1945)
Medal "For the Victory over Germany in the Great Patriotic War 1941–1945" (1945)
Jubilee Medal "Twenty Years of Victory in the Great Patriotic War 1941-1945" (1965)
Jubilee Medal "Thirty Years of Victory in the Great Patriotic War 1941–1945" (1975)
Jubilee Medal "In Commemoration of the 100th Anniversary of the Birth of Vladimir Ilyich Lenin" (1969)
Jubilee Medal "30 Years of the Soviet Army and Navy" (1948)
Jubilee Medal "40 Years of the Armed Forces of the USSR" (1958)
Jubilee Medal "50 Years of the Armed Forces of the USSR" (1968)
Jubilee Medal "60 Years of the Armed Forces of the USSR" (1978)
Medal "Veteran of the Armed Forces of the USSR" (1976)
Medal of Sino-Soviet Friendship (China)
