= Khvalynsky Uyezd =

Khvalynsky Uyezd (Хвалынский уезд) was one of the subdivisions of the Saratov Governorate of the Russian Empire. It was situated in the northeastern part of the governorate. Its administrative centre was Khvalynsk.

== Demographics ==
At the time of the Russian Empire Census of 1897, Khvalynsky Uyezd had a population of 192,718. Of these, 56.0% spoke Russian, 20.5% Tatar, 20.3% Mordvin, 3.0% Chuvash, 0.1% German and 0.1% Ukrainian as their native language.
