= Georgy Lobov =

Soviet fighter pilot and squadron commander (1915–1994)

- Георгий Агеевич Лобов
- Born: Georgy Ageevich Lobov; 7 May 1915; Yekaterinodar, Kuban Oblast, Russian Empire
- Died: 6 January 1994 (aged 78); Moscow, Russia
- Military career
- Allegiance: Soviet Union
- Branch: Soviet Air Force
- Service years: 1935–1975
- Rank: Lieutenant general
- Commands: 7th Guards Fighter Aviation Division; 303rd Guards Fighter Aviation Division; 64th Fighter Aviation Corps
- Conflicts: World War II; Korean War
- Awards: Hero of the Soviet Union

Georgy Ageevich Lobov (Russian: Гео́ргий Аге́евич Ло́бов; 7 May 1915 – 6 January 1994) was a Soviet fighter pilot and squadron commander of the 7th Guards Fighter Aviation Division during World War II who was credited with 10 solo and 7 shared aerial victories. He later commanded the 64th Fighter Aviation Corps, during the Korean War.

== Early life ==
Lobov was born on 7 May 1915 at the city of Yekaterinodar, to a family of a railway workers. He graduated from a seven-year school to become a factory teacher. He later worked at the Proletariat cement plant in Novorossiysk, as a roaster, instructor and secretary of the Komsomol organization of the plant.

In 1934 he graduated from the Rostov branch of the Institute of Mass Extramural Education of the Party activist under the Central Committee of the All-Union Communist Party of Bolsheviks. In 1934, he entered the Novocherkassk Aviation Institute and in 1935 he graduated from the first course of the institute.

== Military career ==
In 1935, he was drafted into the Red Army and later to the Red Army Air Force. He was sent to study at the 7th Military Pilot School named after the Stalingrad Red Banner Proletariat in Stalingrad, from which he graduated in 1938 with honors. From November 1938, he served in the 19th Fighter Aviation Regiment of the 54th Aviation Brigade at the Air Force of the Leningrad Military District, where he served as flight commander. In June 1939, he was appointed as assistant military commissar of the squadron.

In the ranks of the 19th Fighter Aviation Regiment from 17 September 1939, to 8 October 1939, he participated in the 1939 Soviet invasion of Poland, and from November 1939 to March 1940, he flew 66 sorties during the Winter War. During this war. he was awarded his first Order of the Red Star. In 1939, he joined the Communist Party of the Soviet Union. He flew Polikarpov I-16 in both the war campaigns.

=== World War II ===
Following the outbreak of Operation Barbarossa on 22 June 1941, Lobov took part an air battle over an airfield in Wysokie Mazowieckie, during which he was slightly wounded, but did not quit the battle. He fought with the Western Front, in the ranks of the 19th Fighter Aviation Regiment. From September 1941, he was assigned to the Leningrad Front. While flying a MiG-3, he scored his first aerial victory on 3 October 1941 over Lake Ladoga, while repelling a Luftwaffe raid on ships delivering cargo to Leningrad. From October 1941, he was assigned as a military commissar of the squadron of the 26th Air Defense Fighter Aviation Regiment at the Leningrad Front. Lobov scored three more aerial victories by January 1942.

From February 1942, he was appointed military commissar of the 286th Fighter Aviation Regiment of the Leningrad Front. In 1942, he flew 70 escort sorties to ensure the safety of transport aircraft flights to besieged Leningrad, without losing any of them to enemy fighters, while flying a I-16. From May 1942 to June 1943, Lobov was the commander of the escort of Second Secretary of the Communist Party of the Soviet Union Andrei Zhdanov's weekly in and out flights from Leningrad. From November 1942, he fought as deputy commander for political affairs of the 275th Fighter Aviation Division, flying Yak-1 and La-5. For two years, he fought in air battles over Leningrad, Kronstadt and Road of Life in Lake Ladoga.

From June 1943, Lobov was appointed as Deputy Commander of the 322nd Fighter Aviation Division. Flying La-5 and La-7s, he fought in the Western, Bryansk, 1st Baltic, 3rd Belorussian and 1st Ukrainian fronts. He participated in the Battle of Kursk, Bryansk, Nevel, Gorodok, Belorussian and Vistula–Oder offensives. On 25 July 1944, he led an aerial assault at a railway station in Tilsit, East Prussia. In August 1944, Lobov organized and personally led a series of 4 assault air strikes against the largest enemy airfields in East Prussia. During the change of command of the division from 1 to 14 November 1944, he temporarily served as division commander.

In February 1945, he was appointed commander of the 7th Guards Fighter Aviation Division and commanded it until the end of the war. The division provided air cover for crossings across the Neisse River in preparation for the Berlin offensive. It participated in Berlin and Prague offensives. Lobov scored his 10th and last aerial victory of the war, when he shot down a Heinkel He 111 bomber over the Czechoslovak city of Mělník. It is also considered as the last of the enemy aircraft destroyed by Soviet pilots in the Great Patriotic War.

During the war, Lobov flew I-16, MiG-3, Yak-1, La-5, La-7 and Yak-3 fighters. He flew 346 sorties, and shot down 10 enemy aircraft personally and 7 in the group. According to his memoirs, he claimed that he shot down 15 enemy aircraft personally and 8 in the group.

=== Post war ===
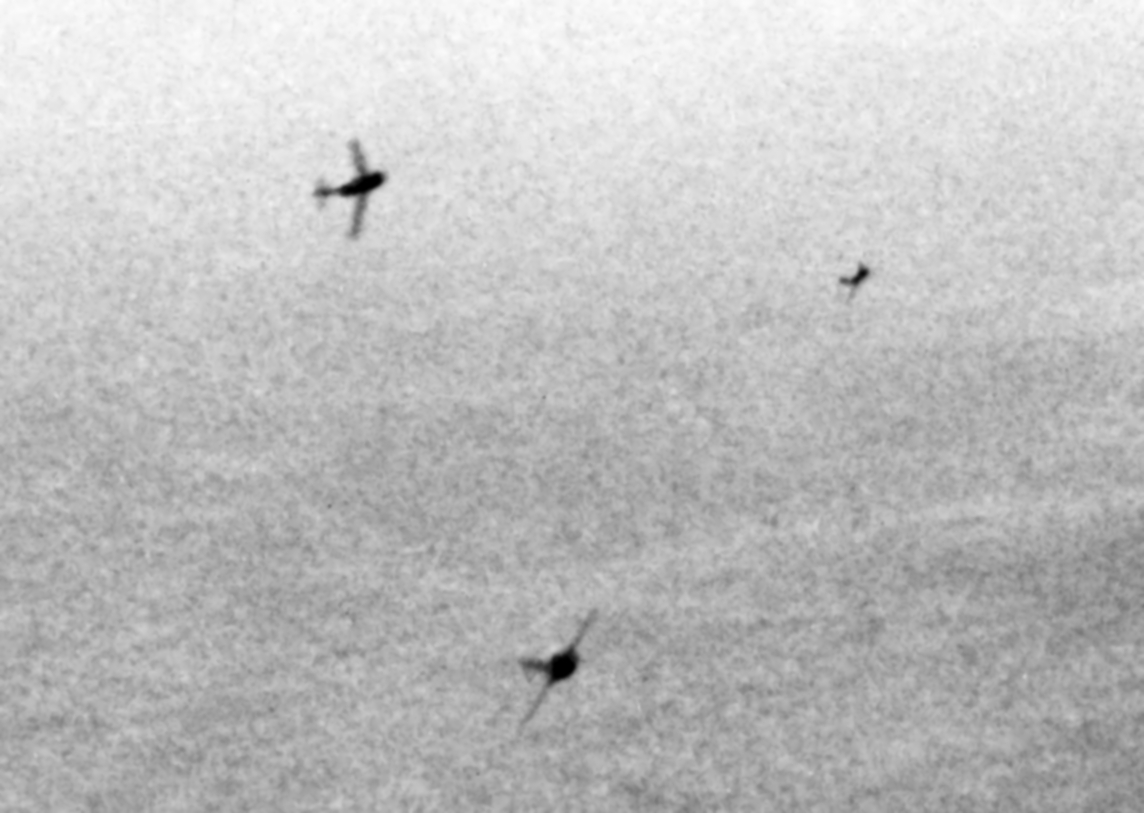
MiG-15s curving in to attack USAF B-29s during the Korean War, 1951.

After the war, Lobov commanded a division until September 1945, then was sent to study. In 1946, he completed a six-month advanced training course for the commanders of aviation divisions at the Air Force Academy. Since May 1946, he commanded the 303rd Fighter Aviation Division in the 1st Air Army of the Belarusian Military District. In September 1948, the division was transferred to the 19th Air Defense Fighter Army of the Moscow Air Defense District. After the outbreak of the Korean War in June 1950, the 303rd FAD was transferred to the Soviet Far East, and later to airfields in northern China.

In March 1951, he was promoted to Major General. Lobov was stationed in North Korea, first as the commander of the 303rd Fighter Aviation Division and later as commander of the 64th Fighter Aviation Corps from September 1951. Despite his rank and position, he flew missions to show young pilots how to combat enemy aircraft. Lobov flew 15 sorties during the war and shot down four USAF F-80 Shooting Stars in dogfights, while flying the Mikoyan-Gurevich MiG-15. On 10 October 1951, Lobov was awarded the title of Hero of the Soviet Union for his courage and bravery in performing his military duty, while taking into account his merits in the Great Patriotic War.

After returning to USSR, Lobov graduated with honors from the K. Е. Voroshilov Higher Military Academy in 1955.

From November 1955, he served as Inspector General of the Fighter Aviation Inspectorate of the Main Inspectorate at the USSR Ministry of Defense. In April 1957, he was appointed as Inspector General of Frontline Aviation of the Air Force Inspectorate within the Main Inspectorate of the USSR Ministry of Defense. From April 1962, he was Deputy Commander for Combat Training and head of the Combat Training Department and Higher Educational Institutions of the Air Force of the Moscow Military District. From March 1963, he served as the head of the Department of the Air Force at the M. V. Frunze Military Academy. In 1975, he retired from active service.

== Later life ==
From February 1975, he was in reserves. He continued to actively engage in military research work. In the early 90s, he published his memoirs about his participation in the Korean War, one of the first such publications in the Soviet Union.

Lobov died in Moscow on 6 January 1994, at the age of 78. He is buried at the Troyekurovskoye Cemetery. A memorial plaque in honor of him was installed at house#1 on Kudrinskaya Square in Moscow, where he lived from 1955 to 1994.

== Awards and decorations ==
USSR

- Hero of the Soviet Union (10 October 1951)
- Order of Lenin (10 October 1951)
- Order of the Red Banner, four times (26 February 1942, 18 August 1944, 6 May 1945, 30 December 1956)
- Order of Kutuzov, 2nd class (29 May 1945)
- Order of the Patriotic War, 1st class, twice (7 April 1944, 11 March 1985)
- Order of the Red Star, thrice (7 April 1940, 19 November 1951, 16 October 1957)
- Order "For Service to the Homeland in the Armed Forces of the USSR", 3rd class (30 April 1975)
- Medal "For Battle Merit"
- Medal "For the Defence of Moscow" (1 May 1944)
- Medal "For the Defence of Leningrad" (22 December 1942)
- Medal "For the Liberation of Prague" (9 June 1945)
- Medal "For the Capture of Berlin" (9 June 1945)
- Medal "For the Victory over Germany in the Great Patriotic War 1941–1945" (9 May 1945)
- jubilee medals

Foreign

- Order of 9 September 1944, 1st class with swords (Bulgaria)
- Medal of Sino-Soviet Friendship (China)
- Patriotic Order of Merit in gold (East Germany)
- Order of the Red Banner (Mongolia)
- Medal "50 Years of the Mongolian People's Army" (Mongolia)
- Medal "40 Years of Liberation of Korea" (North Korea)
- Brotherhood of Arms Medal (Poland)
