= Atkarsky Uyezd =

Places from Russia

Atkarsky Uyezd (Аткарский уезд) was one of the subdivisions of the Saratov Governorate of the Russian Empire. It was situated in the central part of the governorate. Its administrative centre was Atkarsk.

== Demographics ==
At the time of the Russian Empire Census of 1897, Atkarsky Uyezd had a population of 289,813. Of these, 81.2% spoke Russian, 13.4% Ukrainian, 5.1% German, 0.1% Mordvin and 0.1% Tatar as their native language.
