= Special Moscow Air Defense Army =

- Active: 4 July 1943–24 December 1944
- Country: Soviet Union
- Branch: National Air Defense Forces
- Type: Air defense army
- Garrison/HQ: Moscow
- Engagements: World War II

The Special Moscow Air Defense Army (Russian: Особая Московская армия ПВО) was an army of the National Air Defense Forces during World War II, responsible for the air defense of Moscow. Formed in July 1943 from the Moscow Air Defense Front, its headquarters was used to form the Central Air Defense Front in December 1944.

== History ==
The Special Moscow Air Defense Army was formed on 4 July 1943 in accordance with an order of 29 June from the Moscow Air Defense Front, under the command of Lieutenant General Daniil Zhuravlyov, promoted to colonel general in November 1944. The army was tasked with protecting Moscow and other key targets in the Central Industrial Region from German air attacks. It was part of the newly created Western Air Defense Front and included the 1st Fighter Air Army PVO with four fighter aviation divisions totalling seventeen fighter aviation regiments, fifteen anti-aircraft artillery divisions, three anti-aircraft machine gun divisions, four anti-aircraft searchlight divisions, three divisions of barrage balloons, two divisions of the VNOS (Air Observation, Warning, and Communications Service), five separate anti-aircraft artillery regiments, and thirteen anti-aircraft artillery battalions, among others. On 24 December 1944, the army was ordered disbanded and its headquarters used to form the Central Air Defense Front as part of a reorganization of the Air Defense Forces.
