= 726th Fighter Aviation Regiment =

- Active: 1949–1958
- Country: Soviet Union
- Branch: Soviet Air Forces; Soviet Air Defense Forces
- Type: Fighter Aviation regiment
- Engagements: Korean War

Commanders
- Notable commanders: Vasily Chizh

The 726th Fighter Aviation Regiment (Russian: 726-й истребительный авиационный полк; 726th IAP) was an aviation regiment of the Soviet Air Forces and the Soviet Air Defense Forces.

Formed in 1949, the regiment was equipped with the Mikoyan-Gurevich MiG-15 for most of its service. It served at Yaroslavl as an air defense interceptor unit before being sent to northeast China to serve as part of the 64th Fighter Aviation Corps, the Soviet air unit in the Korean War. Flying from airfields in northeast China, the 726th fought in combat for a year, from July 1952 to July 1953, notably against United States Air Force F-86 Sabres in MiG Alley. After the end of hostilities in the Korean War, the regiment returned to Yaroslavl, where it was disbanded in 1958.

== History ==
On 8 August 1949, the regiment was formed in the Kiev Military District, part of the newly formed 100th Fighter Aviation Division (IAD) of the district's 69th Air Army, equipped with the Mikoyan-Gurevich MiG-15. In July 1950, the division and the 726th IAP were relocated to Yaroslavl's Dyadkovo airfield, and became part of the Moscow Air Defence District's 56th Fighter Aviation Corps (IAK). The division and regiment thus became part of the Soviet Air Defense Forces (PVO). In March 1952, the regiment, commanded by Colonel Leonid Goryachko, relocated to China without its equipment, becoming part of the 64th Fighter Aviation Corps, which oversaw Soviet aviation units fighting in the Korean War. There, it became part of the 133rd Fighter Aviation Division at Mukden West airfield, where it conducted training and received new MiG-15bis fighters after arriving in early April.

At the end of June, upon the completion of its training, the 726th relocated to Antung, where it was placed on combat alert and its pilots flew their first combat missions. It moved to the frontline airfield of Dapu on 12 July. On 16 July 1952, 1st Squadron commander Major Vladimir Fedorets claimed the regiment's first aerial victory northeast of Antung, a North American F-86E Sabre of the 25th Fighter-Interceptor Squadron (FIS) piloted by 1st Lieutenant Richard S. Drezen Jr., who was killed when the aircraft exploded in midair. In the same action another F-86 was credited as damaged. On 1 August, 24 MiGs from the regiment sortied to intercept F-86s heading for the Sui-ho Dam, flying at an altitude of 10,000 meters (33,000 ft). They were surprised by the Sabres, which began their attack with an altitude superiority, and three MiGs were lost with their pilots, including the 3rd Squadron commander. The 726th's pilots broke formation to pursue individual Sabres during the action, preventing them from helping each other. Soviet reports credited the regiment with downing four Sabres, although American reports only list the loss of Major Felix J. Asla of the 336th Fighter-Interceptor Squadron. A Sabre was claimed damaged by one of the 726th's pilots on 4 August, and another followed on 5 August.

On 6 August, two aircraft of the regiment downed an F-84E Thunderjet of the 58th Fighter-Bomber Group over the Sunchon area. The regiment was relocated to Antung on 16 August. Four days later, eighteen MiGs led by Goryachko intercepted F-84s covered by F-86s from the 334th Fighter-Interceptor Squadron in the Koto area during an American airstrike on the Changseong-Pyongyang area. The 726th claimed an F-86 and an F-84 (credited to other causes by American reports), and lost two MiGs and one pilot, the 2nd Squadron commander, Major A.A. Shekhovtsov. The regiment fought an air battle in defense of Taegwan on 9 September against an airstrike of 48 F-84s, escorted by 64 F-86s. A total of 18 MiGs from the regiment, divided into two groups, one led by Goryachko and the other by squadron commander Major Konstantin Degtyarev, intercepted the strike at noon, losing three aircraft and a pilot. The IAP was credited with destroying 14 F-84s, although the United States Air Force reported the loss of only three Thunderjets.

In a 15 September dogfight in the Singisiu-Changseong area, pilots from the 726th claimed one Sabre downed and one damaged. On the same day, the pilots of the 3rd Squadron flew alongside for the first time those of the 578th Fighter Aviation Regiment, a Pacific Fleet unit sent to Manchuria to gain combat experience for naval pilots. On 26 September, a MiG was lost when its pilot crashed on landing at Antung. In dogfights with Sabres covering F-84s in the Anju area on 12 October, the regiment's pilots claimed two Sabres downed without loss, though these losses are not corroborated by American reports. A pilot from the regiment damaged a Sabre from the 334th FIS which had to be written off after a belly landing at its base, in final victory of November. In actions on 24 December pilots from the regiment claimed three Sabres downed, but American reports only mention the loss of one F-86F from the 334th FIS.

On 6 January 1953, a pilot from the regiment damaged an F-86 of the 16th Fighter-Interceptor Squadron, which crashed at its base with the loss of its pilot. The regiment participated in the interception of an airstrike of F-84Gs covered by Sabres on "targets in the Hihong area" on 15 January, claiming the downing of three F-86s with the loss of one MiG and its pilot. The 726th moved to Anshan on 20 January. The 3rd Squadron flew one of its last missions with the 578th on 15 February, days before the latter returned to the Soviet Union. A MiG from the regiment was lost on 4 April when its pilot "placed excessive stress" on its wings, resulting in one falling off before he successfully ejected. Pilots from the 726th claimed a Sabre damaged in actions in the area of Changseong and Taechon on 7 June. The regiment claimed two Sabres downed without loss in the interception of a raid in the Anju area on 14 June. In one of its last dogfights of the war, the 726th claimed a Sabre downed and two damaged on 16 July. On the next day, a pilot from the 3rd Squadron claimed the last Sabre downed of the war. On 27 July, the war ended with the signing of the armistice. During its deployment in Korea, the regiment claimed 39 UN aircraft, including 18 fighter-bombers and 21 fighters, for the loss of 12 MiGs and seven pilots.

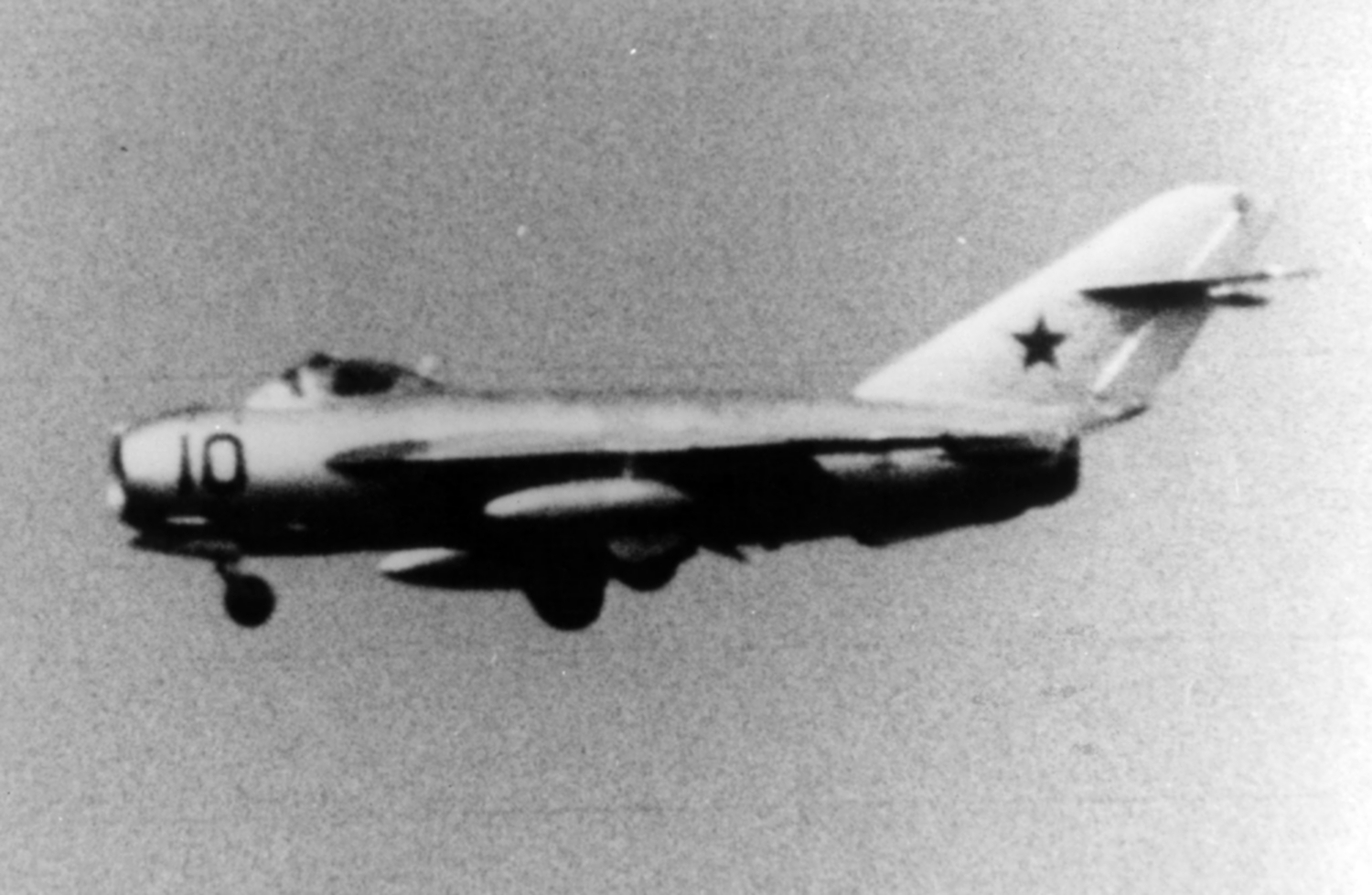
A MiG-17 of the type operated by the regiment after the Korean War

On 13 September, the regiment returned to Yaroslavl with the 133rd IAD, becoming part of the 56th IAK, part of the 52nd Fighter Aviation Army PVO. It reequipped with the newer MIG-17F in 1955. The 726th was disbanded at Yaroslavl with the 133rd on 14 February 1958.

== Aircraft operated ==
Aircraft operated by 726th IAP, data from
From	To	Aircraft	Version
1950	1955	Mikoyan-Gurevich MiG-15	
1955	1958	Mikoyan-Gurevich MiG-17	MiG-17F

== Commanders ==
The following officers commanded the regiment during the Korean War:

- Lieutenant Colonel Leonid Goryachko (March 1952–July 1953)
- Lieutenant Colonel Vasily Chizh (July 1953–Unknown)
