= Saratovsky Uyezd =

Saratovsky Uyezd (Саратовский уезд) was one of the subdivisions of the Saratov Governorate of the Russian Empire. It was situated in the eastern part of the governorate. Its administrative centre was Saratov.

== Demographics ==
At the time of the Russian Empire Census of 1897, Saratovsky Uyezd had a population of 332,860. Of these, 86.2% spoke Russian, 6.7% German, 3.0% Ukrainian, 2.4% Mordvin, 0.6% Tatar, 0.5% Polish and 0.4% Yiddish as their native language.
