= 64th Fighter Aviation Corps =

- Active: 1950–1956
- Country: Soviet Union
- Branch: Soviet Air Forces
- Type: Aviation corps
- Role: Bomber and fighter interception
- Garrison/HQ: HQ at Mukden
- Engagements: Korean War

Commanders
- Notable commanders: Georgy Lobov; Sidor Slyusarev

Aircraft flown
- MiG-15

The 64th Fighter Aviation Corps (64th IAK) was an aviation corps of the Soviet Air Forces. The corps was the parent unit for Soviet interceptor units based in northeastern Manchuria during the Korean War.

The unit claimed a 3.4:1 kill ratio in favor of USSR pilots, destroying 1,097 enemy aircraft of all types during the war.

== History ==
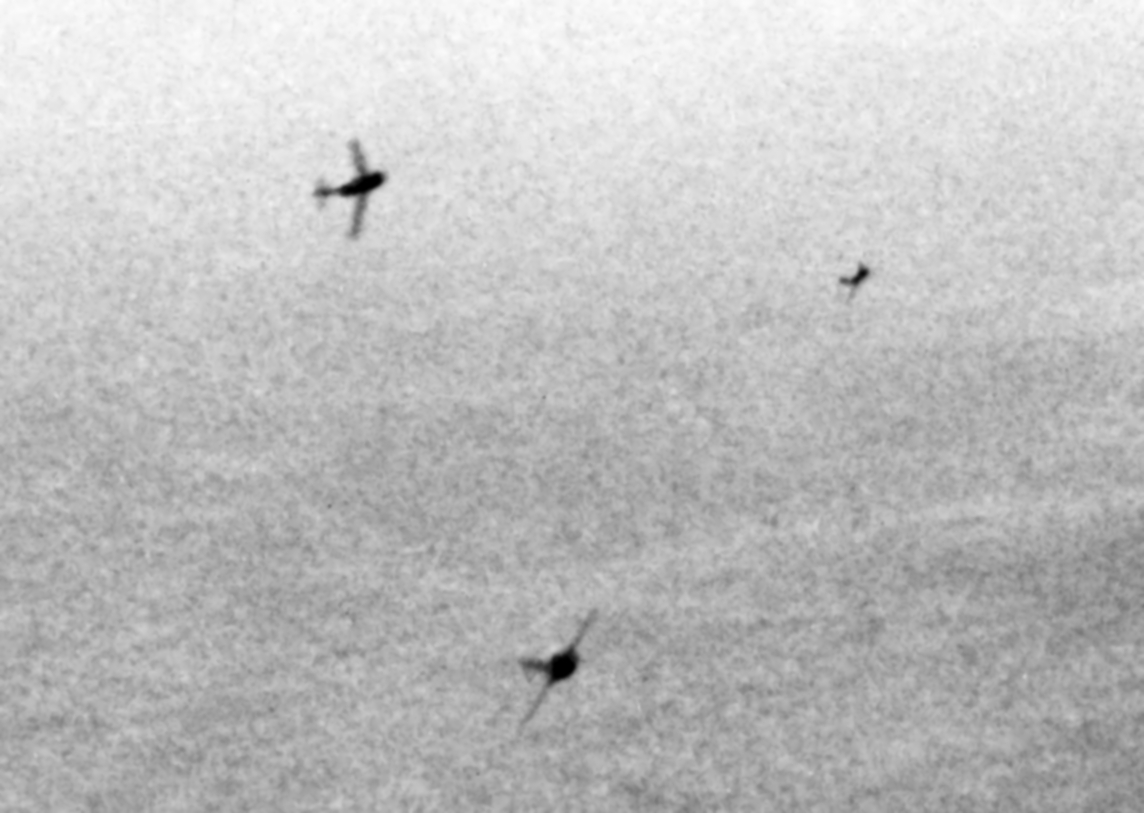
Three MiG-15s attacking B-29s in 1951

The Korean War broke out in June 1950. On 11 October 1950, Stalin agreed to send Mikoyan-Gurevich MiG-15 fighters of the Soviet Air Forces to provide air cover for the Chinese Communist People's Volunteer Army units then moving into North Korea. Tasked with providing air cover for bridges and for the hydroelectric power plants on the Yalu River, as well as for North Korean facilities and for the Chinese Communist rear area, 64th IAK pilots also trained Chinese Communist and North Korean pilots. On 1 November, Soviet MiG-15s began defensive patrols over the Yalu River. The 64th Fighter Aviation Corps, established on 14 November, comprised the 28th, 50th and 151st Guards Fighter Aviation Divisions. It was first commanded by Major General Ivan Belov. The Mig-15s of the 64th IAK began to clash with United Nations jet fighters, such as the North American F-86 Sabre.

On 1 November 1951, the 64th IAK became part of the People's Liberation Army Air Force's 1st United Air Army. In March 1952, the corps received new MiG-15bis aircraft. On 21 April 1952, pilots of the corps shot down two F-86s while losing six MiGs. On 4 July, the corps suffered its heaviest losses of the war when it lost 11 MiGs. During the Korean War, the corps flew 64,000 sorties and conducted 1,872 air battles. According to the inflated official totals of the corps, 1,250 UN Forces aircraft were shot down, 1,100 by MiGs and 150 by antiaircraft artillery. The corps lost 335 aircraft, killing 120 pilots and 68 antiaircraft gunners.

The USSR claimed an overall kill ratio at 3.4:1 in favor of USSR pilots. Effectiveness of the Soviet fighters declined as the war progressed. While between november 1950 and January 1952 overall kill ratio was 7.9:1 in favor of the USSR, this declined 2.2:1 during 1952 and 1.9:1 in 1953. This was due in part to more advanced jet fighters appearing on the UN side and improving US tactics.

After the cease-fire of 27 July 1953, the corps withdrew from Korea. It moved to Petrozavodsk and became part of the 22nd Air Army. In Karelia, the corps included the 26th, 216th and 336th Fighter Aviation Divisions. The corps disbanded in 1956.

== Composition ==
The composition of the corps constantly varied. During the war, the corps went through 12 fighter aviation divisions, two separate night fighter regiments, 2 Naval Aviation fighter wings, four antiaircraft artillery divisions and different rear units. The corps was composed of 26,000 personnel in 1952. On 1 November of the same year, 321 aircraft were in the combat units.

The participation of the Soviet Union in the Korean War was kept secret, and pilots were forbidden to approach the front line or fly over the sea. The aircraft used PLAAF markings and pilots were given Chinese Communist documents and uniforms. During the early actions, they were required to not speak Russian during missions and had to learn Korean phrases. After the first battles, the requirement was removed because it was practically impossible. The details of the Soviet participation in the Korean War were published in the Soviet Union only during the 1970s and 1980s. Despite all the secrecy, United Nations pilots were aware of the Soviet presence.

=== Corps Aviation units ===
The 64th Fighter Aviation Corps included three divisions from 27 November 1950 to March 1951.

- 28th Fighter Aviation Division
  - 67th Fighter Aviation Regiment
  - 139th Guards Fighter Aviation Regiment
- 50th Fighter Aviation Division
  - 29th Guards Fighter Aviation Regiment
  - 177th Fighter Aviation Regiment
  - 7th Fighter Aviation Regiment of the PLA Air Force (operational subordination)
- 151st Guards Fighter Aviation Division
  - 28th Guards Fighter Aviation Regiment
  - 72nd Guards Fighter Aviation Regiment

The 50th Fighter Aviation Division was formed and the 151st Guards Fighter Aviation Division's transfer made from the resources of the Air Forces of the Moscow Military District and the 67th Fighter Aviation Corps. Combat support was provided by elements of the 149th Fighter Aviation Division of the 55th Separate Fighter Air Defence Corps, commanded by Major General P.F. Batitsky.

The original divisions were replaced by the following units in February 1951.

- 303rd Smolensk Red Banner Fighter Aviation Division
  - 17th Fighter Aviation Regiment
  - 18th Guards Fighter Aviation Regiment
  - 523rd Fighter Aviation Regiment
- 324th Svir Red Banner Fighter Aviation Division
  - 176th Guards Fighter Aviation Regiment
  - 196th Fighter Aviation Regiment
- 351st Fighter Aviation Regiment from the 106th Fighter Aviation Division of the Shanghai Air Defence Group of Forces – took part from 23 June 1951 to 18 February 1953 as a separate night fighter aviation regiment equipped with La-11 and MiG-15s from February 1952
- 97th Fighter Aviation Division Air Defence
  - 16th Fighter Aviation Regiment PVO
  - 148th Guards Fighter Aviation Regiment PVO
- 190th Polotsk Red Banner Fighter Aviation Division
  - 256th Fighter Aviation Regiment
  - 494th Fighter Aviation Regiment
  - 821st Fighter Aviation Regiment

In July 1952, new aviation units replaced the previous divisions.

- 32nd Red Banner Fighter Aviation Division
  - 224th Fighter Aviation Regiment
  - 535th Fighter Aviation Regiment
  - 913th Fighter Aviation Regiment
- 133rd Fighter Aviation Division
  - 147th Special Purpose Guards Fighter Aviation Regiment
  - 415th Fighter Aviation Regiment
  - 726th Fighter Aviation Regiment
  - 578th Fighter Regiment Air Force Pacific Fleet (under operational control)
- 216th Gomel Fighter Aviation Division PVO
  - 518th Fighter Aviation Regiment
  - 676th Fighter Aviation Regiment
  - 878th Fighter Aviation Regiment
  - 781st Fighter Aviation Regiment Air Force Pacific Fleet (subordinated to 216th IAD)

In February 1953, the 351st Fighter Aviation Regiment was replaced by the 298th Fighter Aviation Regiment. Both were night fighter units.

In July 1953, the previous units were withdrawn and replaced by the following units.

- 37th Fighter Aviation Division
  - 236th Fighter Aviation Regiment
  - 282nd Fighter Aviation Regiment
  - 940th Fighter Aviation Regiment
- 100th Fighter Aviation Division PVO
  - 9th Guards Fighter Aviation Regiment
  - 731st Fighter Aviation Regiment
  - 735th Fighter Aviation Regiment

=== Corps air defence and security units ===
- 28th Anti-Aircraft Artillery Division (January 1953 – until the end)
  - 503rd Anti-Aircraft Artillery Regiment
  - 505th Anti-Aircraft Artillery Regiment
  - 507th Anti-Aircraft Artillery Regiment
- 35th Anti-Aircraft Artillery Division (January 1953 – until the end)
  - 508th Anti-Aircraft Artillery Regiment
  - 513th Anti-Aircraft Artillery Regiment
- 87th Anti-Aircraft Artillery Division (March 1951 – January 1953).
  - 151st Anti-Aircraft Artillery Regiment
  - 1777th Anti-Aircraft Artillery Regiment
- 92nd Anti-Aircraft Artillery Division (March 1951 – January 1953).
  - 666th Anti-Aircraft Artillery Regiment
  - 667th Anti-Aircraft Artillery Regiment
- 16th Aviation Maintenance Division (July 1953 – December 1954)
  - 180th Airfield Logistics Battalion
  - 277th Airfield Logistics Battalion
  - 838th Airfield Logistics Battalion
  - 854th Airfield Logistics Battalion
  - 859th Airfield Logistics Battalion
- 18th Aviation Maintenance Division (June 1951 – July 1953)
- 10th Anti-Aircraft Searchlight Regiment (March 1951 – February 1953)
- 20th Anti-Aircraft Searchlight Regiment (January 1953 – December 1954)
  - 65th FIES Detachment Artillery Instrumental Reconnaissance
  - 61st Anti-Aircraft Searchlight Company
- 1406th Hospital of Infectious Diseases
- 8th Military Mobile Field Hospital
  - 534th Radiography Detachment
  - 70th Disinfection Platoon
  - 99th Disinfection Platoon
  - 18th Plague Prevention Detachment
  - 357th Anti-Epidemic Sanitary Laboratory
- 81st Communication Company (November 1950 – April 1953)
- 727th Communications Battalion (April 1953 – December 1954)
- 133rd Radio Engineering Battalion (April 1953 – December 1954)
- 61st Radar Company (radio navigation; April 1953 – December 1954)
- 114th Special Purpose Radio Regiment

Antiaircraft artillery divisions were equipped with various types of equipment. The 87th Antiaircraft Artillery Division had 59 85mm guns and 56 37mm antiaircraft guns. The 92nd Antiaircraft Artillery Division had 96 85mm and 84 37mm antiaircraft guns. Units at the time at batteries composed of four guns and battalions composed of 12 guns.

Each antiaircraft searchlight regiment had to equip 36 Radio RAP-150 stations. The regiment consisted of three searchlight battalion (4 searchlight companies to 12 stations). The searchlight platoon was equipped with RAP-2 150 and 2 3-15-3 Antiaircraft Searchlight Stations. At the same time searchlight platoon stands out for night fighting maneuvering MSA batteries originally had a total of one station RAP-150 and three stations 3-15-4. The practice of combat work stations showed the unreasonableness of using RAP-150 when shooting at low-flying targets, as in mountainous terrain interference observed in the entire range of the station. In addition, the inability to adjust radar stations RAP-150 elevation with frequent change of position, lack of agility stations and the difficulty masking her forced to abandon the use of RAP-150 in mobile platoons. Radioprozhektornaya station RAP-150: mirror diameter of 150 cm, arc lamp, radiolocator, automatic tracking of the illuminated target. The brightness of the searchlight beam at a height of 5–7 km – 1,200 units or 1.5 million candles (for comparison – the brightness of the sun – 900 units).

== Commanders ==
- Major General Ivan Belov (14 November 1950 – 17 September 1951)
- Major General Georgy Lobov (18 September 1951 – 26 August 1952)
- Lieutenant General Sidor Slyusarev (26 August 1952 – 12 May 1955)
