= Tsaritsynsky Uyezd =

Tsaritsynsky Uyezd (Russian: Царицынский уезд) was one of the subdivisions of the Saratov Governorate of the Russian Empire. It was situated in the southern part of the governorate. Its administrative centre was Tsaritsyn (present-day Volgograd).

== Demographics ==
At the time of the Russian Empire Census of 1897, Tsaritsynsky Uyezd had a population of 161,472. Of these, 87.1% spoke Russian, 7.9% Ukrainian, 2.2% German, 1.1% Tatar, 0.5% Yiddish, 0.4% Kalmyk, 0.4% Belarusian, 0.1% Polish, 0.1% Mordvin and 0.1% Armenian as their native language.
