= 6th Fighter Aviation Corps of Air Defence =

The 6th Fighter Aviation Corps of Air Defence was a military formation of the Red Army Air Force Air Defense Aviation of the Soviet Armed Forces, which fought in the Great Patriotic War.

The corps had the successive names the 6th Air Defence Fighter Aviation Corps and the Moscow Air Defence Fighter Corps.

== Creation of the Corps ==
The corps was formed by the order of People's Commissar of Defence, dated June 19, 1941, on the basis of the 24th Fighter Aviation Division and the 78th Fighter Aviation Divisions together supervising the 11th, 16th, 24th, 27th, 34th, 120th, 176th, 177th, 178th, 233rd, and 309th Fighter Aviation Regiments. The headquarters of the corps was located in Moscow on Kirov Street, house 33. Colonel Ivan Ivanovich Komarov was appointed chief of staff. In June 1941, it had 175 crew of Yak-1, MiG-3, LaGG-3 aircraft, and 212 I-16 and I-153 crews. By July 9, the corps included 21 fighter aviation regiments, by July 22, 1941 - 29, in which there were 585 aircraft, of which 170 MiG-3, 75 LaGG-3, 95 Yak-1, 200 I-16 and 45 I-153.

In accordance with the order of the People's Commissar of Defence, four air defence aviation control zones were established:

- Western sector, under deputy corps commander Lieutenant Colonel P. M. Stefanovsky, controlling seven fighter aviation regiments.
- Northern sector, under deputy corps commander Colonel A. I. Mitenkov, controlling three fighter aviation regiments
- Southern sector, under deputy corps commander Colonel N. K. Trifonov, controlling six fighter aviation regiments
- Eastern sector, under deputy corps commander Major M. N. Yakushin, subordinate to two IAP

On the basis of NKO order No. 0087, issued on May 21, 1943, the corps was transformed into the 1st Fighter Air Defence Army in the first half of June 1943. The 6th Corps served as part of the "Active Army" from June 22, 1941, to June 9, 1943.
