= Kamyshinsky Uyezd =

Division of Saratov Governorate, Russian Empire

- Uyezd of Russian Empire
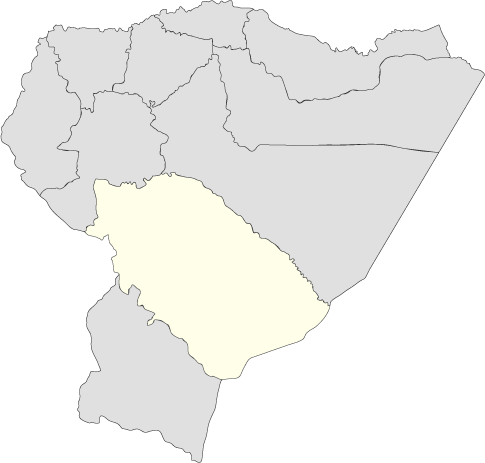
- Map of Kamyshinsky Uyezd, around 1900
- Capital: Kamyshin
- Population
  - 1897: 307,493

Kamyshinsky Uyezd (Russian: Камышинский уезд) was an administrative division (an uyezd) of Saratov Governorate in the Russian Empire and the early Russian SFSR. It existed in various forms in 1780–1928. A large part of the district's population were Volga Germans who spoke German. Almost 75% of all German speakers within Saratov Governorate lived in the uyezd according to the 1897, census.

== Demographics ==
=== Language ===
- Population by mother tongue according to the Imperial census of 1897.

Language	Number	percentage (%)	males	females
Russian	136,695	44.6	66,155	70,540
German	123,939	40.3	62,192	61,747
Ukrainian	46,156	15.0	23,043	23,113
Belarusian	351	0.1	184	167
Polish	112	0.0	62	50
Gypsy	49	0.0	27	22
Tatar	44	0.0	37	7
Mordvin	32	0.0	30	2
Yiddish	30	0.0	19	11
Armenian	9	0.0	6	3
Latvian	8	0.0	6	2
Bashkir	6	0.0	4	2
Chuvash	1	0.0	1	0
Other	61	0.0	38	23
Total	307,493	100.0	151,804	155,689
