= Western Air Defense Front =

- Active: 1st formation: 29 June 1943 – 29 March 1944; 2nd formation: 24 December 1944 – May 1945
- Country: Soviet Union
- Branch: National Air Defense Forces
- Type: Air defense front
- Garrison/HQ: Moscow (1st formation); Vilnius (2nd formation)
- Engagements: World War II

The Western Air Defense Front (Russian: Западный фронт ПВО) was an air defense front of the National Air Defense Forces during World War II, formed twice. It was first formed in June 1943 and was responsible for the air defense of the western part of European Russia. It was reorganized in March 1944 along with the Eastern Air Defense Front to form the Northern and Southern Air Defense Fronts. The front was reformed in December 1944 from the Northern Air Defense Front and was responsible for air defense in the sectors of fronts.

== First formation ==
The front was formed by an order of 29 June 1943, which divided European Russia into the Western and Eastern Air Defense Fronts. The Western Air Defense Front was responsible for the territory west of Mezen, Totma, Soligalich, Shuya, Sasovo, Povorino, Armavir, Kislovodsk, and Sochi. Headquartered in Moscow, it was commanded by Colonel General Mikhail Gromadin for the duration of its existence. The front included the Special Moscow Air Defense Army (formed from the Moscow Air Defense Front), three corps, and eight air defense division regions, for a total of 1,012 fighter aircraft, 4,172 anti-aircraft guns, 2,280 anti-aircraft machine guns, 1,573 searchlights, and 1,834 barrage balloons.

Between September 1943 and March 1944, more than a hundred separate air defense units and 186 anti-aircraft machine gun units were transferred to it from the Eastern Air Defense Front. During this time the 9th Fighter Aviation Corps PVO served with the front. During the summer and fall campaign of 1943 and the winter campaign of 1944, the forces of the front claimed to have downed 1,200 Axis aircraft. On 29 March 1944 the Western and Eastern Fronts were ordered to be reorganized into the Northern and Southern Air Defense Fronts.

== Second formation ==
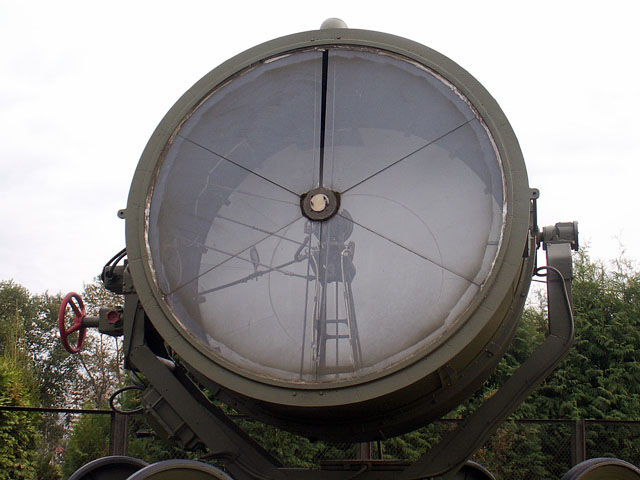
An anti-aircraft searchlight of the type used by the searchlight units of the front

The front was reformed by an order of 24 December from the Northern Air Defense Front with five corps, four air defense divisions, and eight fighter aviation divisions. Headquartered at Vilnius, it was commanded by Colonel General Daniil Zhuravlyov for the duration of its existence. The front covered troops and facilities in the sectors of the fronts from Axis air raids. The forces of the front were also involved in covering front groups during the strategic operations of 1944 to 1945. During the Vistula–Oder Offensive, in the sector of the 1st Belorussian Front alone, more than 900 anti-aircraft guns were positioned, freeing up three anti-aircraft artillery divisions to cover the frontline troops. During the Battle of Berlin more than 140 searchlights from the front were used to illuminate a night attack by the 1st Belorussian Front. The front was disbanded in May 1945 at the end of the war.
