= Volsky Uyezd =

Volsky Uyezd (Вольский уезд) was one of the subdivisions of the Saratov Governorate of the Russian Empire. It was situated in the northeastern part of the governorate. Its administrative centre was Volsk.

== Demographics ==
At the time of the Russian Empire Census of 1897, Volsky Uyezd had a population of 184,561. Of these, 94.5% spoke Russian, 1.7% Tatar, 1.7% Mordvin, 1.3% Chuvash, 0.5% German, 0.1% Latvian, 0.1% Ukrainian and 0.1% Polish as their native language.
