= Kuznetsky Uyezd (Saratov Governorate) =

Kuznetsky Uyezd (Кузнецкий уезд) was one of the subdivisions of the Saratov Governorate of the Russian Empire. It was situated in the northeastern part of the governorate. Its administrative centre was Kuznetsk.

== Demographics ==
At the time of the Russian Empire Census of 1897, Kuznetsky Uyezd had a population of 178,356. Of these, 61.8% spoke Russian, 19.8% Tatar, 16.0% Mordvin, 2.2% Chuvash and 0.1% German as their native language.
