= 120th Fighter Aviation Regiment =

Soviet fighter aircraft regiment

The 120th Fighter Aviation Regiment was a fighter aircraft regiment of the Soviet Air Forces, formed twice in 1940 and 1969.

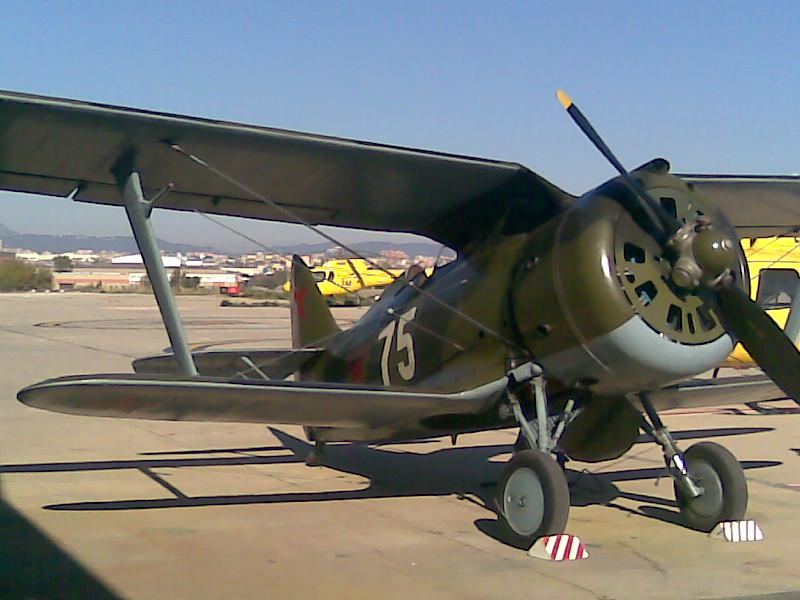
Polikarpov I-153 biplane fighter aircraft

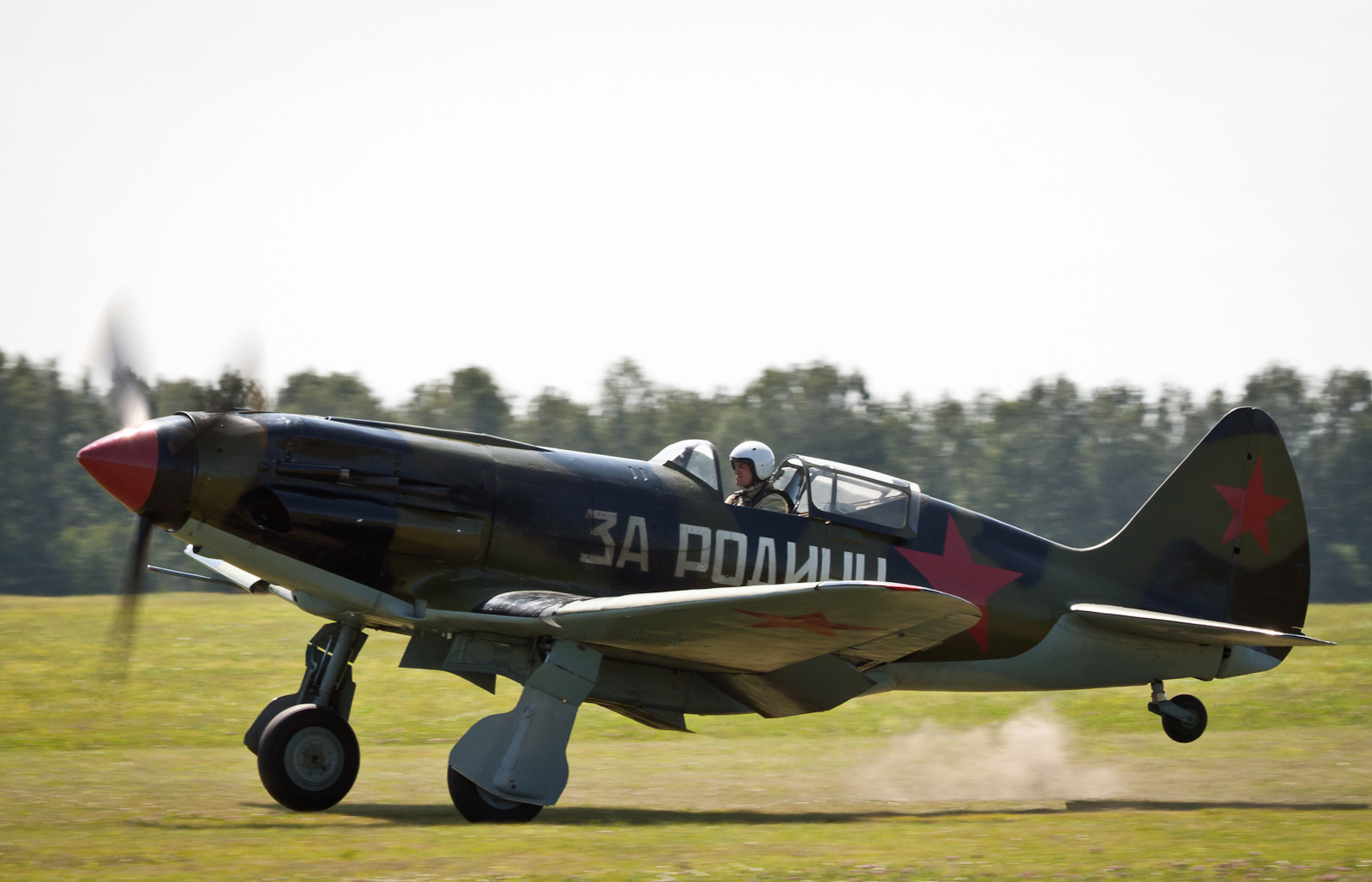
MiG-3 aircraft

== First Formation ==
Initially the regiment was formed from October 24, 1940, in the Moscow Military District in the city of Klin equipped with Polikarpov I-153 aircraft. Pilots were drawn from 1940 graduates of the Batayskaya, Kamenskaya, Kachinskaya, Chkalovskaya, Chuguevskoy and Odessa military aviation schools. The regiment completed its formation and attained combat readiness as part of the Moscow Air Defence District on December 31, 1940. It was allocated the Field mail number 35470. It formed part of the 24th Fighter Aviation Division.

From June 22, 1941, the regiment was at war, as part of the Great Patriotic War, defending against the German Operation Barbarossa. On 7 March 1942, in recognition of the regiment's "exemplary performance of combat missions and the courage and heroism shown," it was redesignated the 12th Guards Fighter Aviation Regiment PVO. It was thus part of the "Active Army" for 185 days from June 22, 1941, to March 7, 1942.

=== Regiment commanders 1940 - 1942 ===
- lieutenant colonel Devotchenko, Ivan Georgievich, from January 1, 1941, to July 2, 1941
- Major Pisanko Alexander Stepanovich, from July 2, 1941, to March 6, 1942
- Major, Lieutenant Colonel Marenkov Konstantin Vasilyevich, from March 6, 1942, to December 31, 1945

In 1969 the regiment was reformed, as the 120th Fighter Aviation Regiment (1969 formation) in the Belorussian Military District.
