= Balashovsky Uyezd =

Subdivision of Saratov Viceroyalty, Astrakhan and Saratov governorates

Balashovsky Uyezd (Russian: Балашовский уезд) was one of the subdivisions of the Saratov Governorate of the Russian Empire. It was situated in the western part of the governorate. Its administrative centre was Balashov.

== Demographics ==
At the time of the Russian Empire Census of 1897, Balashovsky Uyezd had a population of 311,704. Of these, 86.5% spoke Russian, 13.2% Ukrainian, 0.1% German and 0.1% Belarusian as their native language.
