= Daniil Zhuravlyov =

Russian ice hockey player

- Born: 8 April 2000 (age 26) Nizhny Novgorod, Russia
- Height: 6 ft 0 in (183 cm)
- Weight: 163 lb (74 kg; 11 st 9 lb)
- Position: Defense
- Shoots: Left
- KHL team Former teams: Torpedo Nizhny Novgorod; Ak Bars Kazan
- NHL draft: 146th overall, 2018; Colorado Avalanche
- Playing career: 2017–present

Daniil Nikolaievich Zhuravlyov (Russian: Даниил Николаевич Журавлёв; born 8 April 2000) is a Russian professional ice hockey defenseman currently playing under contract with Torpedo Nizhny Novgorod of the Kontinental Hockey League (KHL). He was selected in the fifth round, 146th overall, by the Colorado Avalanche in the 2018 NHL entry draft.

== Playing career ==
Zhuravlyov played with the Torpedo Nizhny Novgorod hockey school as a teen, before moving to continue his development within Ak Bars Kazan. He made his debut in the MHL with JHC Irbis during the 2016–17 season, scoring 2 goals and 8 points in 35 games as a 16-year-old. Showing a defensive acumen and sound two-way game, Zhuravlyov was promoted to Ak Bars' second-tier club, Bars Kazan, the following season registering 2 points in 11 games. He played the majority of the 2017–18 season in the MHL, producing 9 goals and 18 points through 28 games.

Ranked 50th amongst international skaters by the NHL Central Scouting Bureau, Zhuravlyov was selected in his first year of eligibility in the fifth round, 146th overall, by the Colorado Avalanche in the 2018 NHL entry draft. He continued his development with Bars Kazan in the VHL in the 2018–19 season, finishing his first full professional season by making 40 appearances with 5 assists as an 18-year-old.

Contracted with Ak Bars through 2021, Zhuravlyov impressed head coach Dmitri Kvartalnov through training camp and was elevated to remain with the senior squad to open the 2019–20 season. As a 19-year-old he made his KHL debut on opening night in a 3–2 defeat to reigning champions CSKA Moscow on 3 September 2019. In his third game, Zhuravlyov impressed in registering his first point, an assist, in a 6–3 victory over HC Sochi on 7 September 2019. In collecting three assists through his first 10 games while playing significant minutes in a second pairing role due to injuries among the blueline, Zhuravlyov was honored as the KHL's rookie of the month for September.

On 2 May 2022, Zhuravlyov signed a two-year, entry-level deal with the Colorado Avalanche. After attending his first training camp with the Avalanche, Zhuarvlyov was assigned to American Hockey League (AHL) affiliate, the Colorado Eagles, to begin the 2022–23 season. Zhuravlyov posted 1 assists through 14 games on the blueline for the Eagles before reports surfaced of his intention to return to his native Russia for personal reasons and rejoin former club, Ak Bars. On 21 November 2022, Zhuravlyov was officially suspended by the Avalanche on his return to Russia, with the club initially retaining his rights. With no clause in his contract pertaining to a release to the KHL, Zhuravlyov was later placed on unconditional waivers by the Avalanche in order for a mutual termination of the remainder of his contract on 19 December 2022.

As a free agent, Zhuravlyov officially returned to Ak Bars Kazan for the remainder of the 2022–23 season on 20 December 2022.

Following six seasons with Ak Bars Kazan, Zhuravlyov was traded to fellow KHL outfit Torpedo Nizhny Novgorod in exchange for financial compensation on 2 September 2025.

== International play ==
Medal record

Representing Russia

Ice hockey

World Junior Championships
Silver medal – second place	2020 Czech Republic	
Bronze medal – third place	2019 Canada	

Zhuravlyov first represented Russia at the junior level at the 2016 Winter Youth Olympics. He later made his North American debut at the 2016 World U-17 Hockey Challenge, featuring in 6 games in a bronze medal effort. He went on to appear with Russia at the 2017 Ivan Hlinka Memorial Tournament, 2018 World Junior A Challenge and the 2018 IIHF World U18 Championships.

Kovalenko returned to the national stage after he was selected to the Russian team for the 2019 World Junior Championships in Vancouver, Canada. He ended the tournament with 1 assist in 7 games, helping Russia claim the Bronze medal against Switzerland on 6 January 2019.

== Career statistics ==
=== Regular season and playoffs ===
			Regular season					Playoffs
Season	Team	League	GP	G	A	Pts	PIM	GP	G	A	Pts	PIM
2016–17	Irbis Kazan	MHL	35	2	6	8	6	10	1	0	1	2
2017–18	Irbis Kazan	MHL	28	9	9	18	12	5	0	1	1	0
2017–18	Bars Kazan	VHL	11	1	1	2	0	—	—	—	—	—
2018–19	Bars Kazan	VHL	40	0	5	5	8	—	—	—	—	—
2018–19	Irbis Kazan	MHL	4	0	0	0	0	—	—	—	—	—
2019–20	Ak Bars Kazan	KHL	36	1	7	8	8	—	—	—	—	—
2019–20	Irbis Kazan	MHL	—	—	—	—	—	2	0	1	1	0
2020–21	Ak Bars Kazan	KHL	38	3	10	13	20	10	1	1	2	4
2021–22	Ak Bars Kazan	KHL	43	1	5	6	14	6	0	2	2	2
2021–22	Bars Kazan	VHL	1	0	1	1	0	—	—	—	—	—
2022–23	Colorado Eagles	AHL	14	0	1	1	6	—	—	—	—	—
2022–23	Ak Bars Kazan	KHL	16	0	2	2	8	16	0	4	4	2
2023–24	Ak Bars Kazan	KHL	63	3	8	11	16	5	0	0	0	2
2024–25	Ak Bars Kazan	KHL	55	0	6	6	16	1	0	0	0	0
2025–26	Torpedo Nizhny Novgorod	KHL	67	3	9	12	9	10	0	0	0	2
KHL totals			318	11	47	58	91	48	1	7	8	12

=== International ===
Year	Team	Event	Result	GP	G	A	Pts	PIM
2016	Russia	U17	3rd place, bronze medalist(s)	6	0	1	1	2
2017	Russia	IH18	4th	5	0	3	3	4
2018	Russia	U18	6th	5	0	5	5	0
2019	Russia	WJC	3rd place, bronze medalist(s)	7	0	1	1	2
2020	Russia	WJC	2nd place, silver medalist(s)	7	0	2	2	4
Junior totals				30	0	12	12	12

== Awards and honours ==
Award	Year
KHL
Rookie of the Month (September)	2019
