= Saratov Governorate =

1797–1928 unit of Russia

Coordinates: 51.5333°N 46.0000°E

Saratov Governorate Саратовская губерния
- Governorate of the Russian Empire (1797–1917), Russian Republic, and RSFSR (1917–1928)
- 1797–1928
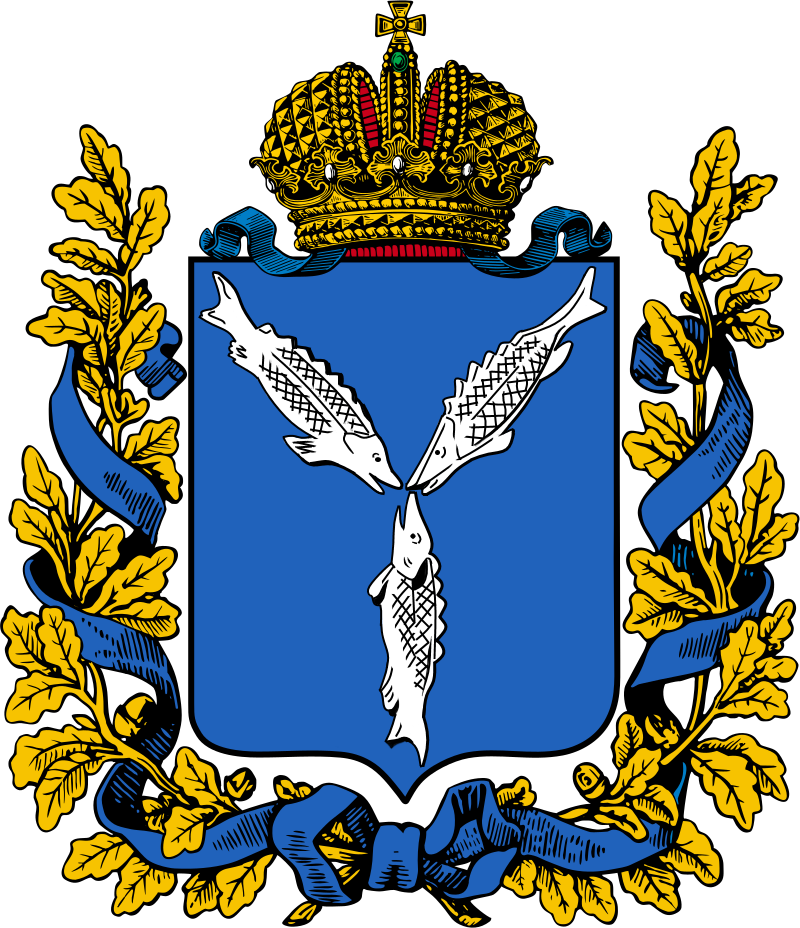
- Coat of arms

- Location in the Russian Empire
- Capital: Saratov
- Area
- 84,495.2 km^{2} (32,623.8 sq mi)
- Population
  - 1897: 2,405,829
- History
  - Established: 1797
  - Disestablished: 1928
| Preceded by | Succeeded by |
| Saratov Viceroyalty | Lower Volga Oblast; Middle Volga Oblast |

Saratov Governorate (Russian: Саратовская губе́рния, romanized: Saratovskaya guberniya) was an administrative-territorial unit (guberniya) of the Russian Empire and the Russian SFSR.

== History ==
On December 25, 1769, the Saratov province was established as part of the Astrakhan Governorate.

On January 11, 1780, Empress Catherine the Great issued a decree of the establishment of the Saratov governorship of the northern districts of the Astrakhan Governorate to begin on November 7 of that year, followed by a decree on who will lead the new governorship.

For the grand opening of the Saratov governorship, on February 3, 1781, the Astrakhan governor, along with lieutenant-general Jacobi and Bishop Anthony arrived from Astrakhan.

On August 23, 1781, the Empress issued a decree approving the emblems of the city of Saratov and several Saratov governorship county-level cities (Atkarsk, Balashov, Kamyshin, Khvalynsk, Kuznetsk, Petrovsk, Serdobsk, Tsaritsyn, and Volsk).

In 1796, 41 of the governorships which were created by Catherine II had been abolished by her son Emperor Paul I of Russia including a decree on December 12, 1796, to abolish the Saratov governorship, and have its uyezds distributed between Penza and Astrakhan province. Because of the decree of March 5, 1797, Penza province was renamed Saratov province, and Saratov was appointed a provincial city. On October 11, 1797, from the Saratov governorate the governorates of Tambov, Nizhny Novgorod and Simbirsk were established, from the rest of the Saratov province decree dated September 9, 1801, the Penza Governorate was established.

In 1802, Novokhopyorsky Uyezd was ceded to the Voronezh Governorate, and Chernoyarsky Uyezd was ceded to the Astrakhan governorate.

In 1835, three new uyezds were created - Nikolayevsk, Novouzensk and Tsarevsky. In 1851, Tsarevsky Uyezd was transferred to the Astrakhan governorate, and Nicholas and Novouzensk Uyezd - to the newly created Samara Governorate.

Because of the decree of July 5, 1878, the coat of arms of Saratov province was approved with the depiction of an azure shield, in which three silver starlets are placed in a forked cross. The shield is crowned by the imperial crown and surrounded by golden oak leaves emblazoned with St. Andrew's cross.

In 1918, part of the governorate was incorporated into the newly formed autonomous region of the Volga Germans.

In 1919, part of Kamyshinsky (returned in 1920) and Tsaritsynsky uyezds were transferred to the newly formed Tsaritsyn governorate. The structure of the governorate came from the province of Samara, Nicholas Uyezd and Novouzensk Uyezd.

In 1920, due to downsizing Novouzensk Uyezd formed Dergachyovsky and Pokrovsk Uyezds.

In 1921, due to downsizing Atkarsky Uyezd formed Yelansky Uyezd.

In 1922, Pokrovsk Uyezd was transferred to the Volga German Autonomous Soviet Socialist Republic.

In 1923, the Khvalynsky Uyezd was abolished, its territory is divided between Volsky Uyezd and Kuznetsky Uyezd. Dergachyovsky District was formed through consolidation of Novouzensk Uyezd and Elansky Uyezd with Atkarskaya Uyezd.

In a Resolution of the All-Russian Central Executive Committee on May 21, 1928 Saratov Governorate was abolished and its territory was included in the Lower Volga Oblast, which was later turned into Saratov Krai and Saratov Oblast.

== Subdivisions ==
The Saratov Governorate was divided into 10 uyezds:

- Atkarsky Uyezd
- Balashovsky Uyezd
- Kamyshinsky Uyezd
- Khvalynsky Uyezd
- Kuznetsky Uyezd
- Petrovsky Uyezd
- Saratovsky Uyezd
- Serdobsky Uyezd
- Tsaritsynsky Uyezd
- Volsky Uyezd

== Demography ==
=== Language ===
- Population by mother tongue according to the Imperial census of 1897.

| Language | Number | percentage (%) | males | females |
|---|---|---|---|---|
| Russian | 1,846,436 | 76.7 | 895,661 | 950,775 |
| German | 166,528 | 6.9 | 83,512 | 83,016 |
| Ukrainian | 149,291 | 6.2 | 74,712 | 74,579 |
| Mordvin | 123,893 | 5.1 | 59,419 | 64,474 |
| Tatar | 94,693 | 3.9 | 47,507 | 47,186 |
| Chuvash | 14,403 | 0.6 | 7,063 | 7,340 |
| Polish | 2,596 | 0.1 | 1,781 | 815 |
| Jewish | 2,527 | 0.1 | 1,528 | 999 |
| Belarusian | 1,371 | 0.0 | 756 | 615 |
| Bashkir | 1,262 | 0.0 | 624 | 638 |
| Kalmyk | 733 | 0.0 | 421 | 312 |
| Gypsy | 589 | 0.0 | 310 | 279 |
| Latvian | 324 | 0.0 | 189 | 135 |
| Armenian | 168 | 0.0 | 122 | 46 |
| Other | 1,015 | 0.0 | 699 | 316 |
| Total | 2,405,829 | 100.0 | 1,174,304 | 1,231,525 |

=== Religion ===
- According to the Imperial census of 1897.

| Religion | Number | percentage (%) | males | females |
|---|---|---|---|---|
| Pravoslavs | 2,022,517 | 84.1 | 985,924 | 1,036,593 |
| Old Believers and others split from Pravoslavs | 113,710 | 4.7 | 52,315 | 61,395 |
| Lutherans | 96,958 | 4.0 | 48,528 | 48,430 |
| Islam | 96,001 | 4.0 | 48,177 | 47,824 |
| Reformed | 37,688 | 1.6 | 18.730 | 18.958 |
| Roman Catholic | 34,702 | 1.4 | 18,162 | 16,540 |
| Judaism | 2,953 | 0.1 | 1,716 | 1,237 |
| Buddhists, Lamaists | 731 | 0.0 | 420 | 311 |
| Baptists | 307 | 0.0 | 151 | 156 |
| Armenian Gregorians | 168 | 0.0 | 120 | 48 |
| Karaites | 12 | 0.0 | 6 | 6 |
| Anglicans | 11 | 0.0 | 11 | 0 |
| Armenian Catholic Church | 9 | 0.0 | 5 | 4 |
| Mennonites | 6 | 0.0 | 3 | 3 |
| Other: Christian denominations | 33 | 0.0 | 20 | 13 |
| Other: non-Christians | 23 | 0.0 | 16 | 7 |
| Total | 2,405,829 | 100.0 | 1,174,304 | 1,231,525 |

== Notable people ==
- Sergei Bobokhov, Russian revolutionary, who committed suicide as a protest against the flogging of woman comrade in Siberia.
