= List of regiments of the Russian Air Force =

The Russian Air Force, like the Soviet Air Forces before them, has the aviation regiment as its basic organisational unit. This page will slowly attempt to list all the regiments in Russian Air Force service since May 7, 1992, the date on which Boris Yeltsin decreed the establishment of the Russian Ministry of Defence.

Primary initial source for this listing is Piotr Butowski, 'Force Report: Russian Air Force,' Air Forces Monthly, July and August 2007. Other sources included Jane's World Air Forces, Issue 0, March 1996.

== Air Force ==
Listings of Guards titles cannot yet be considered definitive; there are no doubt errors and omissions in the table.

Regiment	Type	Location	Division /Corps	Formation	Aircraft	Remarks /Titles
1st Guards Instructor Bomber Aviation Regiment	IBAP	Lebyazhye	NA	HQ VVS	Su-24	Training unit
2nd Bomber Aviation Regiment	BAP	Dzhida	21st SAD	14th Air Army	Su-24M;
3rd Fighter Aviation Regiment	IAP	Krymsk (air base)	?	4th Air Army	Su-27	Ex 562nd IAP
3rd Bomber Aviation Regiment	BAP	Krzywa, Poland 1961-92	149 BAD	4th Air Army		Briefly at Szprotawa, Poland, early 1992, 4 June 1992, then withdrawn to Lebyazhe, Volgograd Oblast, disbanded 1992 (51°18′34″N 15°43′39″E)
9th Fighter Aviation Regiment	IAP	Kilp-Yavr (Poliarnyi)	?	6th Air Army	Su-27;	Ex 941st IAP
11th Reconnaissance Aviation Regiment	RAP	Marinovka Air Base	?	4th Air Army	Su-24MR;	2005 renamed 6972nd Aviation Base
14th Guards Fighter Aviation Regiment	IAP-VVS	Khalino near Kursk	NA	16th Air Army	MiG-29	Moved in 1998 from Zerdevka to Khalino
18th Guards Assault Aviation Regiment	ShAP	Chernigovka	303th SAD	11th Air Army	Sukhoi Su-25	Galenki (air base) 1993-2009; Chernigovka from 2013
19th Fighter Aviation Regiment	IAP	Millerovo	NA	4th Air Army	MiG-29;
22nd Fighter Aviation Regiment	IAP	Centralnaya Uglovaya (Artem)	23 KPVO	11th Air Army	Su-27;
23rd Fighter Aviation Regiment	IAP	Dzemgi	25th DPVO	11th Air Army	Su-27	First -27SM unit
28th Guards Fighter Aviation Regiment	IAP-VVS	Andreapol	NA	16th Air Army	MiG-29	Reformed from 33 IAP, withdrawn from Wittstock, GSFG 1994
31st Guards Fighter Aviation Regiment	IAP	Zernograd	NA	4th Air Army	MiG-29;
33rd Fighter Aviation Regiment	IAP	Andreapol		16th Air Army	MiG-29	Disbanded 1994.
35th Fighter Aviation Regiment	IAP	Zherdevka		VVS MVO	MiG-29	Disbanded 1996.
41st Fighter Aviation Regiment PVO	IAP	Burevestnik, Iturup Island	24th Air Defence Division PVO	11th Air Defence Army?	MiG-23ML/MLD	Disbanded May 1994
47th Guards Reconnaissance Aviation Regiment	RAP	Shatalovo	NA	16th Air Army	MiG-25 and Su-24MR	Pomerania Red Banner; 1988-93 named 1046th TsBPiPLS
52nd Heavy Bomber Aviation Regiment	TBAP	Shaykovka	22nd TBAD	37th Air Army	Tu-22M3	2009 became part of 6951st Aviation Base. Reported flying TU-22M3 aircraft in the fighting following the Russian invasion of Ukraine that started in 2022. Commander Colonel Timoshin Oleg Yevgenovich as of January 2023.
54th Guards Fighter Aviation Regiment	IAP	Savasleyka	NA	HQ PVO	Su-27	Disbanded 2005-06 (Holm: disbanded 2002 and absorbed by 3958 Aviation Base)
67th Bomber Aviation Regiment	BAP	Siverskiy-2	NA	6th Air Army	Su-24
79th Heavy Bomber Aviation Regiment	TBAP	Ukrainka	326th TBAD	37th Air Army	TU-95MS
98th Guards Reconnaissance Aviation Regiment	RAP	Monchegorsk	NA	6th Air Army	MiG-25RB/U, Su-24MR
103rd Transport Aviation Regiment	VTAP	Smolensk	NA	61st Air Army	Il-76
110th Transport Aviation Regiment	VTAP	Krechevitsy	NA	61st Air Army	Il-76
117th Transport Aviation Regiment	VTAP	Orenburg	NA	61st Air Army	Il-76/An-12
120th Guards Fighter Aviation Regiment	IAP	Domna, 27 km SW Chita	NA	14th Air Army	MiG-29;
121st Heavy Bomber Aviation Regiment	TBAP	Engels-2	22nd TBAD	37th Air Army	Tu-160
138th Independent Mixed Air Regiment	OSAP	Levashevo	NA	6th Air Army	An-12, An-26, Mi-8, Tupolev Tu-134;
159th Fighter Aviation Regiment	IAP	Besovets	NA	6th Air Army	Su-27;
160th Training Aviation Regiment	UAP	Borisoglebsk	786th Training Centre	HQ VVS	Su-27
174th Guards Fighter Aviation Regiment	IAP-PVO	Monchegorsk	21st Air Defence Corps	10th Army PVO	MiG-25, MiG-31	Печенгский Red Banner named for B.F. Safonov, disbanded September 1, 2001
176th Fighter Aviation Regiment	IAP-VVS	Mikha Tskhakaya (Senaki), Georgia	?	34th Air Army	MiG-29	Withdrawn to Bagai-Baranovka in 1992 and disbanded
177th Fighter Aviation Regiment PVO	IAP-PVO	Lodeynoye Pole	54th Air Defence Corps	6th Air Defence Army	Su-27	Disbanded 2009
180th Guards Fighter Aviation Regiment PVO	IAP-PVO	Gromovo	54 ADC	6th Air Defence Army	MiG-31	Disbanded 2002
182nd Heavy Bomber Aviation Regiment	TBAP	Ukrainka	326th TBAD	37th Air Army	Tu-95MS
184th Guards Heavy Bomber Aviation Regiment	TBAP	Engels-2	22nd TBAD	37th Air Army	Tu-95MS	In Ukraine until 2000; reformed at Engels-2 on 1 September 2000.
187th Assault Aviation Regiment	ShAP	Chernigovka	303rd SAD	11th Air Army	Su-25;
196th Transport Aviation Regiment	VTAP	Migalovo	12th VTAD	61st Air Army	Il-76
200th Heavy Bomber Aviation Regiment	TBAP	Belaya	326th TBAD	37th Air Army	Tu-22M3/MR
209th Guards Fighter Aviation Regiment	IAP	Privolzhskiy	12th Air Defence Corps	Russian Air Defence Forces	Su-27	Formed from amalgamation of 393 Gv IAP and 529 IAP. Amalgamated with 562 IAP 2001 and became 3 Gv IAP.
226th Independent Mixed Aviation Regiment	OSAP	Kubinka	NA	KSN	Mi-8, Mi-9, An-12, An-24, An-26, An-30
237th Guards Air Technology Demonstration Centre	TsPAT	Kubinka	NA	16th Air Army	MiG-29, Su-27, Su-27M, L-39C
257th Independent Mixed Aviation Regiment	OSAP	Khabarovsk-Bolshoy	NA	11th Air Army	An-12, An-26, Mi-8;
265th Fighter Aviation Regiment	IAP-PVO	Poduzhemye, Karelian ASSR	23rd Air Defence Division	10th Air Defence Army	Sukhoi Su-27	Disbanded 1994.
266th Assault Aviation Regiment	ShAP	Step	21 SAD	14th Air Army	Su-25;
274th Aviation Regiment of Fighter-Bombers	APIB	Migalovo		VVS MVO	Su-17	Disbanded 1993.
277th Bomber Aviation Regiment	BAP	Khurba	303 SAD	11th Air Army	Su-24	Reformed into the 3rd Combat Regiment before 2022.
296th Bomber Air Regiment	BAP	Marinovka	10 BAD	4 A VVS i PVO	Su-24	Disbanded after 2002
302nd Bomber Aviation Regiment	BAP	Verino	303 SAD	11th Air Army	Su-24
313th Reconnaissance Aviation Regiment	RAP	Bada	21 SAD	14th Air Army	Su-24MR;
334th Transport Aviation regiment	VTAP	Pskov	NA	61st Air Army	Il-76
343rd Instructional Fighter Aviation Regiment	IIAP	Sennoy			MiG-29	Disbanded 1998.
368th Assault Aviation Regiment	ShAP	Budyonnovsk	NA	4th Air Army	Su-25
431st Fighter Aviation Regiment	IAP-PVO	Afrikanda		10th Air Defence Army	Su-15	Formed January 1942; merged with 641 GvIAP in September 1993 to form 470 GvIAP.
444th Heavy Bomber Aviation Regiment	TBAP	Ussuriysk	326th TBAD	37th Air Army	Tu-22M3
445th Fighter Aviation Regiment	IAP-PVO	Savatiya (Kotlas)	23rd Air Defence Division	10th Air Defence Army	MiG-25P	Formed July 1941; 1993 absorbed by the 72nd Guards Fighter Aviation Regiment PVO.
455th Bomber Aviation Regiment	BAP	Chertovitskoye, Voronezh	105 SAD	16th Air Army	Su-24
458th Fighter Aviation Regiment	IAP	Savatiya (Kotlas)	NA	6th Air Army	MiG-25U, MiG-31;
461st Assault Aviation Regiment	ShAP	Krasnodar	NA	4th Air Army	Su-25	Partially formed from portion of 80 OShAP withdrawn from Azerbaijan
470th Guards Fighter Aviation Regiment	IAP-PVO	Afrikanda	NA	6th Air Army	Su-27	Disbanded September 1, 2001
472nd Fighter Aviation Regiment	IAP-PVO	Kursk	7th Division of PVO	Moscow Dist PVO?	MiG-23S	Disbanded May 1, 1998
518th Fighter Aviation Regiment PVO	IAP-PVO	Talagi Airport	Corps PVO	10th Air Defence Army	MiG-31	Formed 1941, disbanded 1998.
524th Fighter Aviation Regiment	IAP-PVO	Letneozersk	22nd Air Defence Corps	10th Air Defence Army	Mikoyan MiG-25P	Disbanded 1994
530th Fighter Aviation Regiment	IAP	Sokolovka	23 PVO	11th Air Army	MiG-25PU, MiG-31
535th Independent Mixed Aviation Regiment	OSAP	Rostov on Don	NA	4th Air Army	Mi-8, An-12 and An-26
559th Bomber Aviation Regiment	BAP	Morozovsk	NA	4th Air Army	Su-24
566th Transport Aviation Regiment	VTAP	Seshcha	12th VTAD	61st Air Army	Il-76/An-124
611th Fighter Aviation Regiment	IAP-PVO	Dorokhovo	32nd KPVO	KSN	Su-27
708th Transport Aviation Regiment	VTAP	Taganrog	NA	61st Air Army	Il-76	15.10.09 renamed 798th Guards Kerch Red Banner Military-Transport Aviation Regiment. Awards from the 192nd Guards Military-Transport Aviation Regiment. (Holm)
712th Guards Fighter Aviation Regiment	IAP-PVO	Kansk	None	14th Air Army	MiG-25PU, MiG-31
722nd Bomber Aviation Regiment	BAP	Smuravyevo	NA	6th Air Army	Su-24;
763rd Fighter Aviation Regiment	IAP				MiG-31	Disbanded 1998.
750th Training Aviation Regiment	UAP	Orsk, Orenburg Oblast	43 TsBPiPLS DA	Long Range Aviation	Tupolev Tu-134UBL	Disbanded 1998.
764th Fighter Aviation Regiment	IAP	Bolshoye Savino	None	HQ VVS	MiG-25PU, MiG-31
765th Fighter Aviation Regiment PVO	IAP-PVO	Salka, Sverdlovsk Oblast	20th Air Defence Corps	4th Air Defence Army		Disbanded 1994?
773rd Fighter Aviation Regiment	IAP	Andreapol	16 GvIAD	16th Air Army	MiG-29	Absorbed by 28 GvIAP, May 1994.
790th Fighter Aviation Regiment	IAP-PVO	Khotilovo	32 KPVO	KSN	MiG-31, MiG-25U
799th Reconnaissance Aviation Regiment	RAP	Varfolomeyevka	NA	11th Air Army	Su-24MR, MiG-25RB(?);
840th Heavy Bomber Aviation Regiment	TBAP	Soltsy-2	22nd TBAD	37th Air Army	Tu-22M3
849th Fighter Aviation Regiment PVO	IAP-PVO	Kupino, Novosibirsk Oblast	41st Air Defence Division	14th Independent Air Defence Army	MiG-23ML/MLD	Kupino 1962–98. Disbanded 1 August 1998.
865th Red Banner Fighter Aviation Regiment	IAP-PVO	Yelizovo	6th Air Defence Division	11th Air Defence Army	Mikoyan MiG-31	Transferred to Pacific Fleet on 1 July 1998
871st Fighter Aviation Regiment	IAP-VVS	Smolensk	?	16th Air Army?	Su-27	Pomerania Red Banner; Withdrawn from Kolobrezg, Poland, disbanded 1993-8
899th Assault Aviation Regiment	ShAP	Buturlinovka	105 SAD	16th Air Army	Su-25
959th Bomber Aviation Regiment	BAP	Yeysk	NA	4th Air Army	Su-24 and L-39C;
960th Assault Aviation Regiment	ShAP	Primorsko-Akhtarsk	NA	4th Air Army	Su-25;
968th Sevastopol Research-Instructor Composite Aviation Regiment	IIAP	Lipetsk	4 TsBPiPLS	HQ VVS	MiG-29, Su-25, Su-27/M, Su-30, Su-24M/MP/34	Altenburg, East Germany, 1989-Apr 92.

== Army aviation component ==
In December 2003 all aviation assets of the Russian Ground Forces were transferred to the Air Force.

Regiment	Type	Location	Formation	Aircraft	Remarks /Titles
45th Independent Helicopter Regiment	OVP	Vorotynsk	KSN	Mi-24	Renamed from 336 OVP to 45 OVP 2000 or 2001
55th Independent Helicopter Regiment	OVP	Korenovsk	4th Air Army	Mi-8/Mi-24
112th Independent Helicopter Regiment	OVP	Chita	14th Air Army	Mi-8/Mi-24
225th Independent Helicopter Regiment	OVP	Protasovo near Ryazan	?	Mi-8/24	1998 225 OVP disbanded and replaced by 865 Heli Reserve Base (BRV)
319th Independent Helicopter Regiment for Battle Control	OVP BU	Chernigovka	11th Air Army	Mi-24
325th Independent Transport-Combat Helicopter Regiment	OTBVP	Yegorlykskaya	4th Air Army	Mi-8/Mi-26
332nd Independent Helicopter Regiment for Battle Control	OVP BU	Pribylovo	6th Air Army	Mi-8/Mi-24
337th Independent Helicopter Regiment	OVP	Tolmachevo (previously Berdsk)	14th Air Army	Mi-8/Mi-24/Mi-28
361st Independent Helicopter Regiment	OVP	Dolinsk-Sokol	11th Air Army	Mi-8
364th Independent Helicopter Regiment	OVP	Srednebelaya	11th Air Army	Mi-8/Mi-24/Mi-26
440th Independent Helicopter Regiment for Battle Control	OVP BU	Vyazma	KSN	Mi-8/Mi-24
487th Independent Helicopter Regiment for Battle Control	OVP BU	Budyonnovsk	4th Air Army	Mi-8/Mi-24
490th Independent Helicopter Regiment for Battle Control	OVP BU	Klokovo	KSN	Mi-8/Mi-24
793rd Independent Helicopter Regiment	OVP	Kinel	5th Air Army	Mi-8/Mi-26
825th Independent Helicopter Regiment	OVP	Garovka	11th Air Army	Mi-6/Mi-8/Mi-26	35th Army

== Index of abbreviations ==
Although the titles of the regiments are translated, the regiment type sort uses the transliterated Russian abbreviation:

- IAP - Fighter Aviation Regiment
- BAP - Bomber Aviation Regiment
- RAP - Reconnaissance Aviation Regiment
- (O)SAP - (Independent) Mixed Aviation Regiment (also sometimes translated as Composite Aviation Regiment)
- UAP - Training Aviation Regiment
- UVP - Training Helicopter Regiment
- 'IAP-PVO' indicates the regiment was part of the Air Defence Forces before 1998, and is air defence dedicated. 'IAP-VVS' indicates that a regiment was part of the Air Force before 1998, and, in most cases, they are regiments tasked with attaining tactical air supremacy. Only a few regiments have a type suffix added yet.
- TsBPiPLS - Centre for Combat Training and Flight Personnel Training
- APIB - Fighter-Bomber Aviation Regiment
- APON - Aviation Regiment for Special Purposes
- IBAP - Instructor Bomber Aviation Regiment
- IISAP - Research Instructor Composite Aviation Regiment
- IVTAP - Instructor Military Transport Aviation Regiment
- OAPSZ - Independent Air Regiment of Tanker Aircraft
- OIAP - Independent Fighter Regiment
- OTBVP - Independent Transport-Combat Helicopter Regiment
- OSAP - Independent Composite Air Regiment
- OTBVP - Independent Transport-Combat Helicopter Regiment
- OVP - Independent Helicopter Regiment
- OVP BU - Independent Helicopter Regiment for Battle Control
- OVTAP - Independent Military Transport Air Regiment
- TBAP - Heavy Bomber Aviation Regiment
- VTAP - Military Transport Aviation Regiment

Other acronyms include:

- AB - Air base
- ABON - Air base for Special purposes
- ABSDRLO - Air Base of Long-range Radiolocation Detection Aircraft (Airborne early warning and control)
- AG - Air group
- BRS - Aircraft Reserve Base
- BRV - Helicopter Reserve Base
- CBPiBP - Centre for Combat Training and Combat Application
- CBPiPLS - Centre for Combat Training and Flight Personnel Training
- DPVO - Division of the PVO
- HQ - Headquarters
- KPVO - Corps of PVO (Air Defence Forces)
- SAD - Composite Aviation Division
- VVS - literally 'Military Air Forces,' the Russian term for the Russian Air Force
- VTAD - Military Transport Aviation Division
- UCBP - Training Center for Combat Application
- VA - Air Army

The Russian word отдельный can be translated as either 'Independent,' 'Separate' or (rarely) 'Detached'; it designates a unit which is directly subordinate to a formation commander without an intermediate echelon, such as an Aviation Division.
