= Special Purpose Command =

Moscow District of the Air Force and Air Defence Force Special Purpose Command
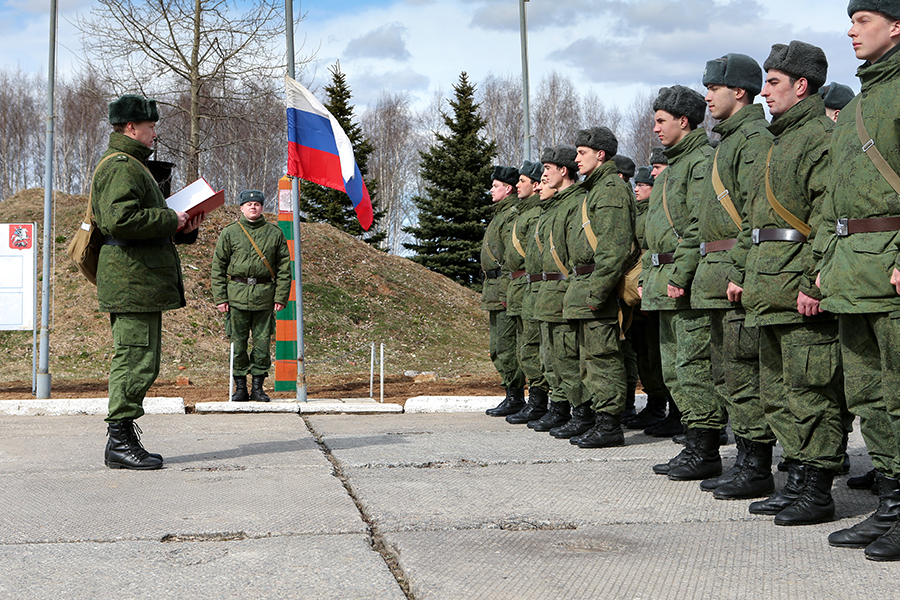
- Lineup of servicemen of the 4th Division of PVO, 9 April 2014
- Active: c. 1945 – present Special Purpose Command: 2002 – July 1, 2009
- Country: Soviet Union; Russia
- Branch: Soviet Air Force; Russian Air Force
- Size: World War II: several air divisions Today: ~ 10+ air defence missile regiments
- Part of: Russian Air Force
- Garrison/HQ: Moscow

Commanders
- Notable commanders: Marshal Anatoly Konstantinov (dismissed 1988)

The Special Purpose Command (Russian: Командование Специального Назначения Latin:Komandovaniye Spetsialnogo Naznacheniya) was a formation of the Russian Air Force, the strongest among the tactical aviation and anti-aircraft groupings. Its zone of responsibility amounted to 1.3 million km^{2}, taking in 40 million people, as well as the country's capital, Moscow. On July 1, 2009 it was superseded by the Operational-Strategic Command for Air-Space Defence (ru:Объединённое стратегическое командование воздушно-космической обороны).

As a result of the air force reforms implemented on June 1, 1998, the Moscow Air Defence District of the PVO and the 16th Air Army of the VVS became a single entity, the Moscow District of the Air Force and Air Defense. According to Krasnaya Zvezda of 16 December 2002, the former Moscow District of the VVS and PVO was reorganised as the Special Purpose Command in September 2002. Interfax says the Moscow District was split into the reactivated 16th Air Army, a tactical force, and the Central Air Defence Zone, an air defense force.

Pyotr Butowski, writing in 2004, seems to indicate that the Special Purpose Command (he makes no mention of ‘the Central Air Defence Zone’) is merely essentially a redesignation of the former Moscow District. The rearrangement of the Moscow District of the VVS and PVO into the Special Purpose Command is apparently connected with plans in the long term for the military-space defense of the central industrial region.

The initial commanding officer of the KSpN was General Lieutenant Yuri Solovyov, later promoted to Colonel-General.

== 2007 structure ==
The 16th Air Army was the most important formation of the Special Purpose Command. Initially formed during the Second World War as a part of the Red Army Air Force, it was from c.2002–2009 the tactical air force component of the Moscow Military District, headquartered at Kubinka.

- 16th Air Army – Kubinka
  - 105th Mixed Aviation Division, Voronezh
    - 455th Bomber Aviation Regiment – Voronezh Malshevo/Baltimor, Voronezh – Su-24, being replaced by Su-34
    - 899th Orshansky Shturmovik (Assault) Aviation Regiment – Buturlinovka – Su-25
  - 14th Guards Fighter Aviation Regiment – Kursk Vostochny Airport – MiG-29
  - 28th Guards Fighter Aviation Regiment – Andreapol (air base) – MiG-29
  - 47th Guards Reconnaissance Aviation Regiment – Shatalovo – MiG-25 and Su-24MR in service
  - 237th Air Technology Demonstration Centre of Guards – Kubinka – MiG-29, Su-27, Su-27M, L-39C
- 226th Separate Mixed Aviation Regiment – Kubinka (air base) – Mi-8, Mi-9, An-12, An-24, An-26, An-30
- 1st Air Defence Corps (Balashikha) (surface to air missiles only)
  - 9th Air Defence Divisions, including the 584 SAM Regiment (Лыткино, Поварово) with the S-400
  - 37th Air Defence Division (Dolgoprudny)
  - four SAM regiments in total
- 32nd Air Defence Corps (Rzhev)
  - 611th Fighter Aviation Regiment – Dorokhovo – Su-27
  - 790th Fighter Aviation Regiment – Khotilovo – MiG-31, MiG-25U
- Army Aviation components
  - 45th Independent Helicopter Regiment – Oreshkovo airfield (Vorotinsk) near Kaluga – Mi-24
  - 440th Independent Helicopter Regiment for battle control – Vyazma Airport – Mi-24, Mi-8
  - 490th Independent Helicopter Regiment for battle control – Klokovo (4 km north of Tula) – Mi-24, Mi-8;
  - 865th Reserve Helicopter Base – Protasovo/Aleksandrovo, near Ryazan

== 2011 structure ==
In 2009 the Russian Air Force was extensively reorganised. Combat Aircraft magazine's June 2010 issue gives some details of the new structure.

The Special Purpose Command was reorganised and renamed in 2011, and then in 2015. On December 1, 2011, a new type of troops were created - the Russian Aerospace Defense Forces (VVKO), and the headquarters of the Order of Lenin Operational-Strategic command of Aerospace Defence was reorganized into the Order of Lenin Air and Missile Defence Command with its headquarters in the city of Balashikha, Moscow Oblast.

In 2013, the 93rd anti-aircraft rocket regiment (ZRP) of the 4th air defence brigade was re-equipped with the S-400 Triumf air defense system, the 108th air defense rocket regiment of the 6th air defence brigade was re-equipped with the S-300PM1 air defence system, the supply of combat vehicles ZRPK "Shell -S" to the military units of the ZRV command.

In 2014, measures were taken to re-equip the 549th Anti-Aircraft Rocket Regiment of the 5th Air Defence Brigade with the S-400 Triumph air defense system, the radio engineering troops (RTV) units continued to be equipped with promising radar stations (radar) of the Nebo, Podlet, Kasta types ”, “VVO”, “Sopka”, “Update”, etc., were supplied to the troops with automated control systems and new generation communications.

Composition for 2011:

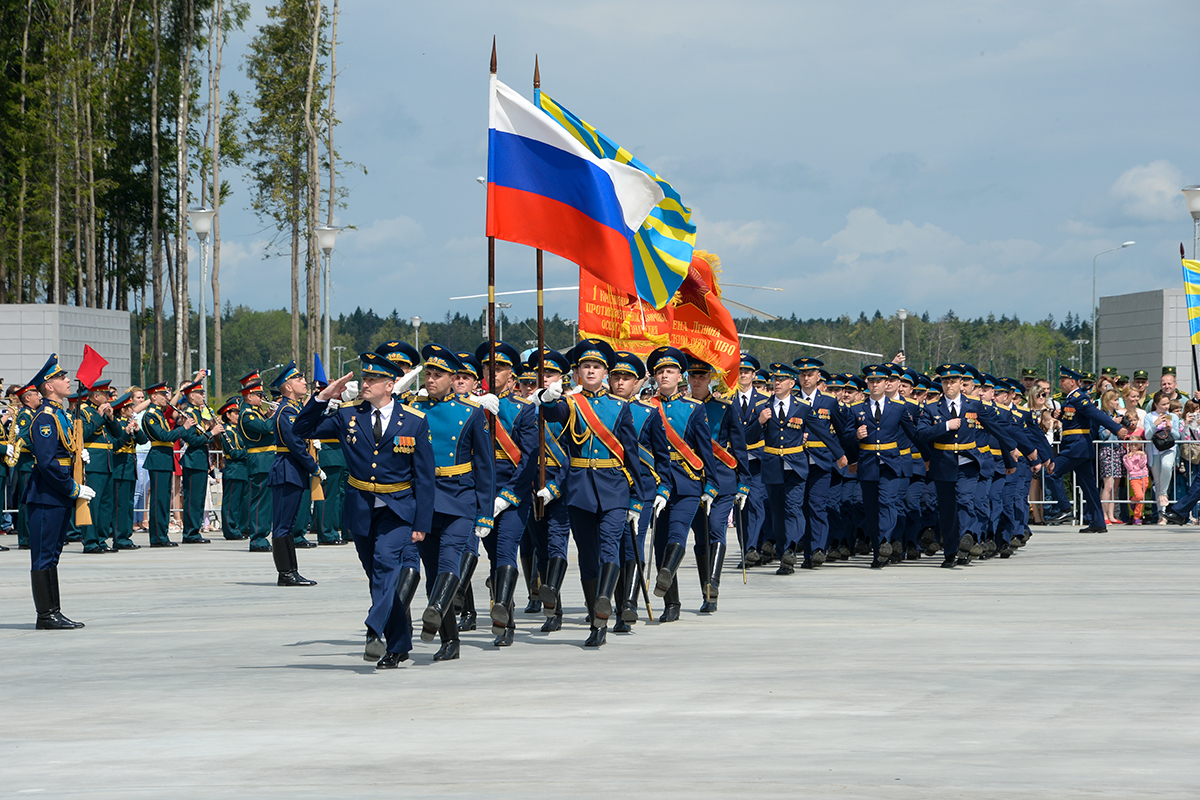
Festivities marking the 100th anniversary of the formation of the Moscow air defence system (Patriot Park), July 2018

- 4th Aerospace Defence Brigade (Dolgoprudny)
  - 210th Anti-Aircraft Rocket Regiment (Dubrovka) - S-300PM, S-400;
  - 584th anti-aircraft Rocket Regiment (Maryino) - S-300PM;
  - 612th anti-aircraft Rocket Regiment (Glagolevo) - S-300PM;
  - 93rd anti-aircraft Rocket Regiment (Funkovo) - S-300PM;
  - 722nd anti-aircraft Rocket Regiment (reduced-status) (Klin) - S-300PS;
  - 25th Radio Engineering Regiment (Nesterovo);
- 5th Aerospace Defence Brigade (Petrovskoe? (Vidnoye?)
  - 606th anti-aircraft Rocket Regiment (Elektrostal) - S-300PM, S-400;
  - 549th anti-aircraft Rocket Regiment (Kurilovo) - S-300PM;
  - 614th anti-aircraft Rocket Regiment (Pestovo) - S-300PM;
  - 629th anti-aircraft Rocket Regiment (Kablukovo) - S-300PM;
  - 799th anti-aircraft Rocket Regiment (frame) (Chastsy) - S-300PS;
  - 9th Radio Engineering Regiment (Torbeevo);
- 6th Aerospace Defence Brigade (Rzhev)
  - 42nd anti-aircraft Rocket Regiment (Valdai) - S-300PS;
  - 108th Anti-Aircraft Rocket Regiment (reduced-status) (Voronezh) - S-300PS;
  - Three radio-technical regiments (335th, 336th, 337th)

The force's designation changed once again in 2011 and 2015:

- Order of Lenin Air and Missile Defence Command (since December 1, 2011);
- 1st Order of Lenin Air and Missile Defence Army of Special Designation (since 2015).
