= Moscow Air Defence District =

- Active: 1954–1998
- Country: Soviet Union; Russia
- Branch: Soviet Air Defence Forces; Russian Air Defence Forces
- Type: Air Defence District
- Decorations: Order of Lenin

Commanders
- Notable commanders: Pavel Batitsky; Alexander Koldunov

The Order of Lenin Moscow Air Defence District was a formation of the Soviet Air Defence Forces and the Russian Air Defence Forces, which existed from 1954 to 1998, to fulfill the tasks of anti-aircraft defence of administrative and economic facilities. The district administration was in Moscow.

== District history ==
The Moscow Air Defence District has a long history, dating back to the Second World War. During the war the defence of Moscow was carried out, in part, by the 1st Air Defence Corps and the 6th Fighter Aviation Corps PVO. As part of these formations at the beginning of massive Nazi air raids had more than 600 fighters; more than 1,000 guns of small and medium calibers; 350 machine guns; 124 fixed anti-aircraft barrage balloons; 612 stations; and 600 anti-aircraft searchlights. The presence of such large forces, skillful management organisation foiled enemy attempts to inflict massive air strikes. Only 2.6% of the total number of Axis aircraft flew in the outskirts of Moscow as a result of their efforts. Air defence forces defending Moscow destroyed 738 enemy aircraft. In addition, assaults by the 6th Fighter Aviation Corps inflicted heavy blows, destroyed 567 enemy aircraft on the ground. Overall, the Air Defence Forces destroyed 1,305 aircraft, and in combat with the enemy armies of Nazi Germany and its allies, alongside the Air Force, destroyed 450 tanks and 5,000 military vehicles. The Moscow district air defence had been provided during the Second World War by initially the Moscow PVO Corps Region. The Corps Region Headquarters, then formed the Moscow Front PVO from 6 April 1942 – 10 July 1943. In turn, the Moscow Front PVO was redesignated as Headquarters, Special Moscow PVO Army.

Until 1950, MiG-15 interceptor regiments were concentrated in the Moscow District to protect the capital against U.S. bomber attack. After 1950 significant elements, the 64th Fighter Aviation Corps, were redeployed to fight in the Korean War.

In 1948 the North-Western Air Defence District was redesignated the Moscow Air Defence Region, which became the Moscow Air Defence District in 1950.

In 1956, the Tagansky Protected Command Point operated as an emergency command post headquarters of the Moscow Air Defence District communication center.

For its great contribution to strengthening the defence power of the Soviet state and its armed defence, success in combat and political training and in connection with the 50th anniversary of the Soviet Army and the Navy by the Decree of the Presidium of the Supreme Soviet of the USSR of June 22, 1968, the Moscow Air Defence District was awarded the "Order of Lenin". The Order was handed over to the Moscow Air Force and Air Defence District for continuity.

The district's commander, Marshal of Aviation Anatoly Konstantinov, was replaced shortly before the Mathias Rust affair in 1988 for insufficient support of Mikhail Gorbachev's perestroika policy.

== History of Moscow's air defence ==
Organising for the air defence of Moscow began on April 25, 1918, when the Military Director of the Moscow District issued Order No. 01 of 25.04.1918, establishing the Moscow Air Defence Directorate.

The units, formations and associations that carried out air defence of Moscow, depending on the prevailing situation and the tasks to be solved, had different organizational forms:

- Office of Moscow's Air Defence (since 25.04.1918);
- 1st separate territorial-positional anti-aircraft artillery battalion (1924)
- 31st separate anti-aircraft artillery battalion (1924-1929);
- 1st Air Defence Brigade (from 21.09.1929);
- 1st Air Defence Division (since 17.08.1931);
- 1st Air Defence Corps (since 11.01.1938). As a result of the uncontrolled flight of a German Junkers Ju 52 aircraft on 15 May 1941 (ru:Инцидент с пролётом Ju-52 над СССР), a repression effort was launched which led to the arrest and death of Hero of the Soviet Union General-lieutenant Pyotr Pumpur in June 1941;
- Moscow Air Defence Zone (since June 1941) including the 24th Fighter Aviation Division and the 120th Fighter Aviation Regiment;
- Moscow Air Defence Corps District (27.12.1941) as part of the Moscow Military District;
- Moscow Air Defence Front (since April 5, 1942)
- Special Moscow Air Defence Army (since June 29, 1943);
- Moscow Air Defence Group Central Front of Air Defence (since December 24, 1944);
- Air Defence Forces of Moscow Central Front of Air Defence (since March 1945);
- Air Defence Forces of Moscow Central District (since October 25, 1945);
- Air Defence Forces of Moscow North-West District of Air Defense of the North-West District (from May 23, 1946);
- Moscow Air Defence Region (since August 14, 1948);
- Moscow Air Defence District (from August 20, 1954);
- Moscow District of the Air Force and Air Defence (since 1998);
- Special Purpose Command (since 1 September 2002);
- Operational-Strategic Command of Air-Space Defence (ru:Оперативно-стратегическое командование воздушно-космической обороны) (1 July 2009 - 1 December 2011)
- Order of Lenin Air and Missile Defence Command (Ордена Ленина командование противовоздушной и противоракетной обороны (1 December 2011 - 2015);
- 1st Army of Air and Aerospace Defence (Special Designation) (1-я ордена Ленина армия противовоздушной и противоракетной обороны особого назначения) (since 1 August 2015)

=== 1st Air Defence Army of Special Designation ===
In August 1950, the Soviet Government decided to create an additional air defence zone around Moscow. The S-25 Berkut stationary anti-aircraft missile system was chosen as the main armament. According to the plan, it was supposed to disperse 56 anti-aircraft rocket regiments armed with S-25 air defence systems in two echelons around Moscow, which were supposed to ensure the defeat of air targets at a depth of 100 kilometers and a reach of about 25 kilometers in height.

The first test of the S-25 took place in July 1951. In 1953, a prototype of the V-200 missile guidance station was tested. At the same time, work began on the arrangement and construction of missile positions and military camps for future air defence formations.

The formation was created as part of the Moscow Air Defence District on October 24, 1952, with the army headquarters in the city of Balashikha Moscow Oblast.

From the end of 1952 and during 1953, units of the 1st Air Defence Army were created. In early December 1953, the creation of the 1st Special Purpose Air Defence Army was completed. As part of the army, 4 "air defence corps" were formed.

In March 1954, the S-25 complexes were delivered to the formation with subsequent adjustment of the equipment, fine-tuning of the components and assemblies of the complexes.

In August 1954, the formation became part of the troops of the Moscow Air Defence District. With the completion of acceptance work for all anti-aircraft missile systems that came at the beginning of 1955, the S-25 system was put into service.

For the full functioning of the units and formations of the 1st Air Defence Army, two rings of concrete roads were built around Moscow with a total length of 2000 kilometers, with a distance of about 50 and 100 kilometers from the center of Moscow. Anti-aircraft missile regiments were dispersed along the outer and inner rings. 34 regiments were dispersed on the outer ring, 22 regiments on the inner ring.

The Moscow District of the Air Force and Air Defence was formed in 1998 on the basis of formations and units of the Moscow Air Defence District District and 16th Red Banner Air Army.

In connection with the ongoing reform of the Russian Armed Forces, the Moscow Region of the Air Force and Air Defence on September 1, 2002 was reorganized into the Special Purpose Command.

The establishment of a new Operational-Strategic Command for Air and Space Defence was reported in 2008-2009. The command was to be established by the end of 2010 and located at Balashikha near Moscow, where the previous 1st Air Defence Corps was located.

== Commanders ==
The following officers commanded the Moscow Air Defence Region or the district during its existence.

- Marshal of the Soviet Union Kirill Moskalenko (1948–1953)
- Colonel-General Nikolay Nikiforovich Nagornyy, 1953 - 1954
- Marshal of the Soviet Union Pavel Batitsky (1954–July 1966)
- Colonel-General Vasiliy Vasilevich Okunev, 7.66 - 8.70
- Marshal of Aviation Aleksandr Koldunov, 8.70 - 1975
- Colonel-General Boris Viktorovich Bochkov, 1975 - 1980
- Marshal of Aviation Anatoly Konstantinov, 1980 - 1987
- 1987–1989 – Colonel-General V. Tsar'kov
- 1989–1991 – Colonel-General Viktor Prudnikov
- 1991–1998 – Colonel-General Anatoly Kornukov.

== The composition of the district ==
The composition of the district included:

In 1955 the district included the 52nd Fighter Aviation Army, the 151st Guards Fighter Aviation Division PVO (Klin, Moscow Oblast, 38th independent Reconnaissance Aviation Squadron (Rzhev, Kalinin Oblast), the 182nd independent Reconnaissance Aviation Squadron 90th independent Transport Aviation Squadron (Stupino, Moscow Oblast), the 1st Guards Anti-Aircraft Artillery Division (Maryino-Znamenskoye, Moscow Oblast), and six other anti-aircraft artillery divisions, and nine other anti-aircraft artillery regiments.

=== District forces 1988 ===
In 1988 the Order of Lenin Moscow Air Defence District had four air defence corps and a division, which included 11 fighter aviation regiments, one transport helicopter regiment, 28 anti-aircraft rocket regiments, and four radar brigades and regiments. The corps were the 2nd, at Balashikha (which included the 28th Guards Fighter Aviation Regiment at Krichev, 3rd at Rzhev, 7th at Kursk, and 16th at Gorky. The 7th Air Defence Corps was redesignated the 7th Air Defence Division in the early 1990s.

Order of Lenin Moscow District of Air Defence (Московский ордена Ленина округа ПВО)

- District Command and Staff (Командование и штаб округа) - Moscow, RSFSR
- 118th District Communications Nod (118-й узел связи округа) - Moscow
- 436th Separate Transport Aviation Regiment (436-й отдельный транспортный авиационный полк) - Stupino, Moscow Oblast, RSFSR - An-12, An-26, An-24, Mi-8
- 1082nd Separate Automobile Battalion of the Moscow District of Air Defence, awarded the Order of Lenin (1082-й отдельный ордена Ленина Московского Округа ПВО автомобилный батальон)
- 1st Red Banner Air Defence Army of Specific Purpose (1-я Краснознамённая армия ПВО особого назначения) - Balashikha, Moscow Oblast, RSFSR
  - 1082nd Command Post (1082-й командный пункт) - Balashikha
  - 9th Communications Nod (9-й узел связи) - Balashikha
  - 2366th Separate Cable Communications Battalion (2366-й отдельный батальон кабельной связи) - Mytishchi, Moscow Oblast, RSFSR
  - 1081st Separate Automobile Battalion (1081-й отдельный автомобилный батальон)
  - 1092nd Separate Automobile Battalion (1092-й отдельный автомобилный батальон)
  - 669th Separate Equipment Service and Overhaul Battalion (669-й отдельный батальон по обслуживанию и восстановлению техники) - Istra, Moscow Oblast, RSFSR
  - - 26 S-300 missile air defence regiments between the four divisions -
  - 52nd Radio-Technical Brigade (52-я отдельная радиотехническая бригада) - Mytishchi
    - 4 separate radio-technical battalions (sing. отдельный радиотехнический батальон):
      - 2317th (Kashira), 2318th (Kosteryovo), 2319th (Savyolovo) and 2320th (Goretovo, Moscow Oblast)
  - 86th Air Defence Division of Specific Purpose (86-я дивизия ПВО специального назначения) - Vidnoye
    - 499th Separate Signals Battalion (499-й отдельный батальон связи) - Vidnoye
    - 6 missile air defence regiments (sing. зенитный ракетный полк):
      - 635th (Stepanshchino village), 628th (Torbeyevo), 705th (Nizhnee Shakhlovo), 16th (Fenino), 614th (Pestovo) and 549th (Klyonovo)
    - 9th Radio-Technical Regiment (9-й радиотехнический полк) - Kashira
    - 1486th Missile Technical Base (1486-я ракетная техническая база) - Tolbino
    - 225th Technical Base (225-я техническая база) - Belye Stolby
  - 87th Air Defence Division of Specific Purpose (87-я дивизия ПВО специального назначения) - Balashikha
    - 501st Separate Signals Battalion (501-й отдельный батальон связи) - Balashikha
    - 6 missile air defence regiments:
      - 674th (Yakovlevo), 799th (Dubky), 654th (Kashino), 756th (Novoye), 629th (Kablukovo) and 606th (Zakharovo)
    - 14th Radio-Technical Regiment (14-й радиотехнический полк) - Kosteryovo
    - 1488th Missile Technical Base (1488-я ракетная техническая база) - Makarovo
    - 194th Technical Base (194-я техническая база) - Fryazevo
  - 88th Air Defence Division of Specific Purpose (88-я дивизия ПВО специального назначения) - Dolgoprudny
    - 187th Separate Signals Battalion (187-й отдельный батальон связи) - Dolgoprudny
    - 7 missile air defence regiments:
      - 789th (Vvedyonskoye (Klin-7 military encampment)), 17th (Borozda (Klin-9 military encampment)), 658th (Maloye Rogachyovo), 722nd (Kovrigino), 748th (Yeryomino), 584th (Maryno) and 566th (Dubrovka)
    - 21st Radio-Technical Regiment (21-й радиотехнический полк) - Savyolovo
    - 1491st Missile Technical Base (1491-я ракетная техническая база) - Trudovaya
  - 89th Air Defence Division of Specific Purpose (89-я дивизия ПВО специального назначения) - Odintsovo
    - 250th Separate Signals Battalion (250-й отдельный батальон связи) - Odintsovo
    - 7 missile air defence regiments:
      - 791st (Vorsino), 662nd (Nesteryovo), 650th (Denkovo), 6th (Arkhangelskoye), 709th (Lyskovo), 612th (Glagolevo) and 625th (Funkovo)
    - 25th Radio-Technical Regiment (25-й радиотехнический полк) - Goretovo
    - 1494th Missile Technical Base (1494-я ракетная техническая база) - Istra
    - 190th Technical Base (190-я техническая база) - Golitsyno
- 2nd Air Defence Corps (2-й корпус ПВО) - Rzhev, Tver Oblast, RSFSR
  - Corps Command and Staff (управление корпуса)
  - Corps Command Post (командный пункт корпуса)
  - Corps Automatised Command and Control Systems Center (центр АСУ корпуса)
  - 4 fighter aviation regiments
    - 28th Guards Leningradskiy, awarded the Order of Kutuzov Fighter Aviation Regiment of the Air Defence Forces (28-й гвардейский истребительный авиационный Ленинградский ордена Кутузова полк ПВО) - Krichev, Mogilyov Oblast, Belarus SSR - MiG-25P/U (not to be confused with the 28th FAR)
    - 790th Awarded the Order of Kutuzov Fighter Aviation Regiment of the Air Defence Forces (790-й истребительный авиационный ордена Кутузова полк ПВО) - Khotilovo (Noviy), Tver Oblast, RSFSR - MiG-25P/U
    - 28th Fighter Aviation Regiment of the Air Defence Forces (28-й истребительный авиационный полк ПВО) - Andreapol, Tver Oblast, RSFSR - MiG-23P/UB (not to be confused with the 28th Guards FAR)
    - 401st Fighter Aviation Regiment of the Air Defence Forces (401-й истребительный авиационный полк ПВО) - Smolensk (Severniy), Smolensk Oblast, RSFSR - MiG-23P/UB
  - 6 missile air defence regiments:
    - 242nd Guards (Mozhaysk), 47th (Turginovo), 195th (Valday), 210th Red Star (Dubrovka), 713th (Narynka (Klin-10 military encampment), Klinsky District) and 1281th (Toropets)
  - 3rd Radio-Technical Brigade (3-я радиотехническая бригада) - Rzhev (Port (Rzhev-3) military encampment), Tver Oblast, RSFSR
- 3rd Air Defence Corps (3-й корпус ПВО) - Yaroslavl, Yaroslavl Oblast, RSFSR
  - Corps Command and Staff (управление корпуса)
  - Corps Command Post (командный пункт корпуса)
  - Corps Automatised Command and Control Systems Center (центр АСУ корпуса)
  - 124th Communications Nod (124-й узел связи) - Yaroslavl
  - 114th Separate Radio-Relay Battalion (114-й отдельный радио-релейный батальон)
  - 380th Separate Electronic Warfare Battalion (380-й отдельный батальон РЭБ)
  - 2 fighter aviation regiments
    - 415th Fighter Aviation Regiment of the Air Defence Forces (415-й истребительный авиационный полк ПВО) - Tunoshna (Yaroslavl), Yaroslavl Oblast, RSFSR - MiG-23P
    - 611th Fighter Aviation Regiment of the Air Defence Forces (611-й истребительный авиационный полк ПВО) - Dorokhovo (Bezhetsk), Tver Oblast, RSFSR - Su-15
  - 79th Guards Missile Air Defence Brigade (79-я гвардейская зенитно-ракетная бригада) - Pitino village (near Cherepovets), Vologda Oblast, RSFSR
  - 7 missile air defence regiments:
    - 48th (Yaroslavl), 164th (Kimry), 380th (Verkhnehovolskiy), 474th (Ogarkovo), 485th (?), 488th (Susanino) and 1257th (Pereslavl-Zalesskiy)
  - 6th Red Banner Radio-Technical Brigade (6-я радиотехническая Краснознамённая бригада) - Yaroslavl, Yaroslavl Oblast, RSFSR
  - 66th Radio-Technical Regiment (66-й радиотехнический полк) - Vologda, Vologda Oblast, RSFSR (disbanded on 22.02. 1989 and absorbed into the 6th RTBde)
- 7th Air Defence Corps - (7-й корпус ПВО) - Bryansk, Bryansk Oblast, RSFSR
  - Corps Command and Staff (управление корпуса)
  - Corps Command Post (командный пункт корпуса)
  - Corps Automatised Command and Control Systems Center (центр АСУ корпуса)
  - 208th Communications Nod (208-й узел связи) - Bryansk
  - 2 fighter aviation regiments
    - 191st Fighter Aviation Regiment of the Air Defence Forces (191-й истребительный авиационный полк ПВО) - Yefremov - MiG-23P/UB
    - 472nd Fighter Aviation Regiment of the Air Defence Forces (472-й истребительный авиационный полк ПВО) - Kursk (Vostochny), Kursk Oblast, RSFSR - MiG-23P/UB
  - 8 missile air defence regiments:
    - 80th Guards (Stukalovo village near Tula), 493rd Guards Venskiy, awarded the Order of the Red Banner, the Order of Kutuzov and the Order of Alexander Nevsky (Ryazan), 108th Tulskiy (Shilovo village near Voronezh), 260th Red Banner (Bryansk), 326th (Podolsk), 559th (?), 791st (?) and 1284th (Yerdenyovo village near Maloyaroslavets)
  - 41st Radio-Technical Brigade (41-я радиотехническая бригада) - Oryol
- 16th Air Defence Corps - (16-й корпус ПВО) - Gorky, Gorky Oblast, RSFSR
  - Corps Command and Staff (управление корпуса)
  - Corps Command Post (командный пункт корпуса)
  - Corps Automatised Command and Control Systems Center (центр АСУ корпуса)
  - 101st Communications Nod (101-й узел связи) - Gorky
  - 904th Separate Radio-Relay Signals Battalion (904-й отдельный радиорелейный батальон) - Gorky
  - 412th Separate Electronic Warfare Battalion (412-й отдельный батальон РЭБ) - Gorky
  - 2 fighter aviation regiments
    - 153rd Fighter Aviation Regiment of the Air Defence Forces (153-й истребительный авиационный полк ПВО) - Morshansk, Tambov Oblast, RSFSR - Su-15 (converted to MiG-31 in 1990)
    - 786th Fighter Aviation Regiment of the Air Defence Forces (786-й истребительный авиационный полк ПВО) - Pravdinsk, Gorky Oblast, RSFSR - MiG-31
  - 72nd Missile Air Defence Brigade (72-я зенитно-ракетная бригада) - Gorodets, Gorky Oblast, RSFSR
  - 4 missile air defence regiments:
    - 371st Guards Bobruysko-Berlinskiy, awarded the Order of the Red Banner, the Order of Alexander Nevsky, the Order of Kutuzov and the Order of Bogdan Khmelnitsky (Kosteryovo, Vladimir Oblast), 291st (Neya village, Kostroma Oblast), 356th (Sharya, Kostroma Oblast) and 387th (Arzamas 16)(often mentioned as the most secretive closed city within the USSR)
  - 9th Radio-Technical Brigade (9-я радиотехническая бригада) - Gorky
  - 65th Radio-Technical Regiment (65-й радиотехнический полк) - Morshansk

=== District forces 1998 ===
- 1st Special Purpose Air Defense Army (Balashikha, Moscow Region);
- 3rd Air Defence Corps (Yaroslavl)
- 7th Air Defence Corps (Bryansk); (division by 1995?)
  - Headquarters, Bryansk, Bryansk Oblast, 1960 – 2001
  - 207th Communications Center (Bryansk, Bryansk Oblast)
  - 153rd Fighter Aviation Regiment PVO (Morshansk, Tambov Oblast)
  - 472nd Fighter Aviation Regiment PVO (Kursk, Kursk Oblast)
  - 108th Anti-Aircraft Missile Regiment (Nikolskoye, Voronezh Oblast)
  - 260th Anti-Aircraft Missile Regiment (Bryansk, Bryansk Oblast)
  - 563rd Anti-Aircraft Missile Regiment (Gorodets, Nizhniy Novgorod Oblast)
  - 9th Radio-Technical Brigade (Nizhniy Novgorod, Nizhniy Novgorod Oblast)
  - 41st Radio-Technical Brigade (Orel, Orel Oblast)
- 16th Air Defence Corps (Nizhny Novgorod);
- 5th Air Defence Division (Rzhev, Tver Region) (2nd Air Defence Corps 1960-94; 5th Air Defence Division 1994-2001)
- 118th Air Defence Command Center (Moscow)
- 436th Independent Transport Aviation Regiment (Stupino, Moscow region);
- 103rd separate regiment of radio technical intelligence and interference (Stupino, Moscow region);
- 2367th separate battalion of radio relay communication (Nemchinovka, Moscow region);
- 52nd Separate Engineering Airfield Battalion (Kosterevo, Moscow Region);
- 1470th Separate Engineering Battalion (Elektrostal, Moscow Region);
- 193rd separate transport battalion (Moscow).

7th Air Defence Division was disbanded in 2001.

=== District fighting strength for 2002 ===
- 16th Air Army (Kubinka):
  - 105th Mixed Aviation Division (Voronezh):
    - 455th Bomber Aviation Regiment (Voronezh, Su-24M, Su-34);
    - 899th Guards Attack Aviation Orsha twice Red Banner, Suvorov Order of the F.E. Dzerzhinsky Regiment Buturlinovka (Su- 25);
  - 226th Independent Composite Aviation Regiment (Kubinka Mil Mi-8, Antonov An-12, Antonov An-24, Antonov An-26, Antonov An-30, Tupolev Tu-134);
  - 5th Independent long-range reconnaissance aviation detachment (Voronezh (An-30);
  - 14th Guards Fighter Aviation Leningrad Red Banner Order of the Kutuzov Regiment (Kursk (Eastern) (MiG -29SMT);
  - 28th Guards Fighter Aviation Leningrad Order of the Kutuzov Regiment (Andreapol (MiG-29);
  - 47th Borisov Red Banner, Suvorov Reconnaissance Aviation Regiment Shatalovo Su-24MR, MiG-25RB);
  - 237th Guards Prozkurovsky Red Banner, the Order of Kutuzov and Alexander Nevsky Aviation Technology Show Center named after Marshal I. Kozhedub Kubinka (L-39, MiG-29, Su-27, Su-27M);
  - 45th Independent Helicopter Regiment (Kaluga (Oreshkovo) (Mi-24);
  - 440th Independent Helicopter Regiment (combat command) (Vyazma (Mi-8, Mi-24);
  - 469th Air Commandant's Office (Mulino Mi-8, Mi-24, Mi-35, Mi-26, Mi-28, Ka-27, Ka-50, Ka-52);
  - 490th Independent Helicopter Regiment (combat command) (Tula (Klokovo) Mi-8, Mi-24, Mi-26 );
  - 865th Reserve Base for Helicopters (Ryazan (Protasovo) (Mi-8, Mi-24 storage);
- 1st Air Defence Corps (Volgodonsk);
  - 8th Aviation Red Banner Special Operations Division (Chkalovsky, (independent air squadron of control and retransmission) (Ilyushin Il-80 aircraft);
  - 9th Air Defense Division (Vidnoye;
  - 37th Air Defense Division (Dolgoprudny);
  - 210th Order of the Red Star Anti-Aircraft Rocket Regiment (Morozki);
  - 584th Guards Air Defense Rocket Regiment);
  - 606th Guards Air Defense Rocket Red Banner Regiment (Elektrostal (S-300 (one division (S-400);
  - The 614th Guards air defense Rocket Vienna Red Banner, the Order of Kutuzov and Alexander Nevsky, the special purpose regiment (Pestovo);
  - 612th Guards air defense Rocket Kiev three times Red Banner, the Order of Suvorov and Bogdan Khmelnitsky regiment (Alabino);
  - The 144th Guards Air Defense Missile Regiment (Domodedovo);
  - The 614th Guards air defence missile Vienna Red Banner, the Order of Kutuzov and Alexander Nevsky, the special purpose regiment (Domodedovo);
  - 70th radio engineering brigade (Naro-Fominsk);
  - 9th Radio Engineering Regiment (Mikhnevo);
- 32nd Air Defense Corps (Rzhev): (former 2nd Air Defence Corps)
  - 611th Przemyslsky Red Banner Order of Suvorov Fighter Aviation Regiment (Dorokhovo near Bezhetsk) (Sukhoi Su-27); (disbanded 1 December 2009)
  - 790th Order of Kutuzov Fighter Aviation Regiment (Khotilovo)
  - 42nd Guards Rocket Guards Rocket Putilov-Kirov Order of Lenin regiment (Valdai;
  - 108th Anti-aircraft Missile Regiment of Tula (Shilovo (Voronezh) ( S-300PS);
  - The 41st radio engineering brigade (Orel);
  - 3rd radio engineering brigade (Rzhev);
  - 6th Radio Engineering Red Banner Brigade (Selifontovo (Yaroslavl);
- 846th center of military applied sports (Istra)

== Literature ==
- AG Lensky, MM Tsybin (2013). "Советские Войска ПВО в последние годы Союза ССР. Часть 1" (Soviet Air Defense Forces in the last years of the USSR. Part I). Organization of troops. Saint Petersburg: INFO OL. p. 164. Comprehensive history of the Air Defence Forces, with unit histories of all units in existence during the last years of the USSR.
- AG Lensky, MM Tsybin (2014). Soviet Air Defense Forces in the last years of the USSR. Part II. Organization of troops. SPb: INFO OL. pp. 108 sec. (With ill.).
- AG Lensky, MM Tsybin (2015). Soviet Air Defense Forces in the last years of the USSR. Part III. Organization of troops. SPb: INFO OL. pp. 144 with. (With ill.).
- I. G. Drogovoz (2003). Воздушный щит Страны Советов [Air shield of the Land of Soviets]. Military Historical Library (in Russian). Minsk: Kharvest. p. 448. ISBN 985-13-1390-4.
