= Achinsk Airport =

Airbase in Russia

Achinsk Airport Аэропорт Ачинск
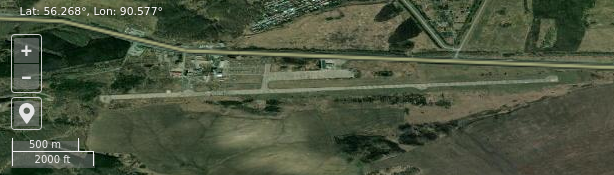
- Satellite imagery of Achinsk air base

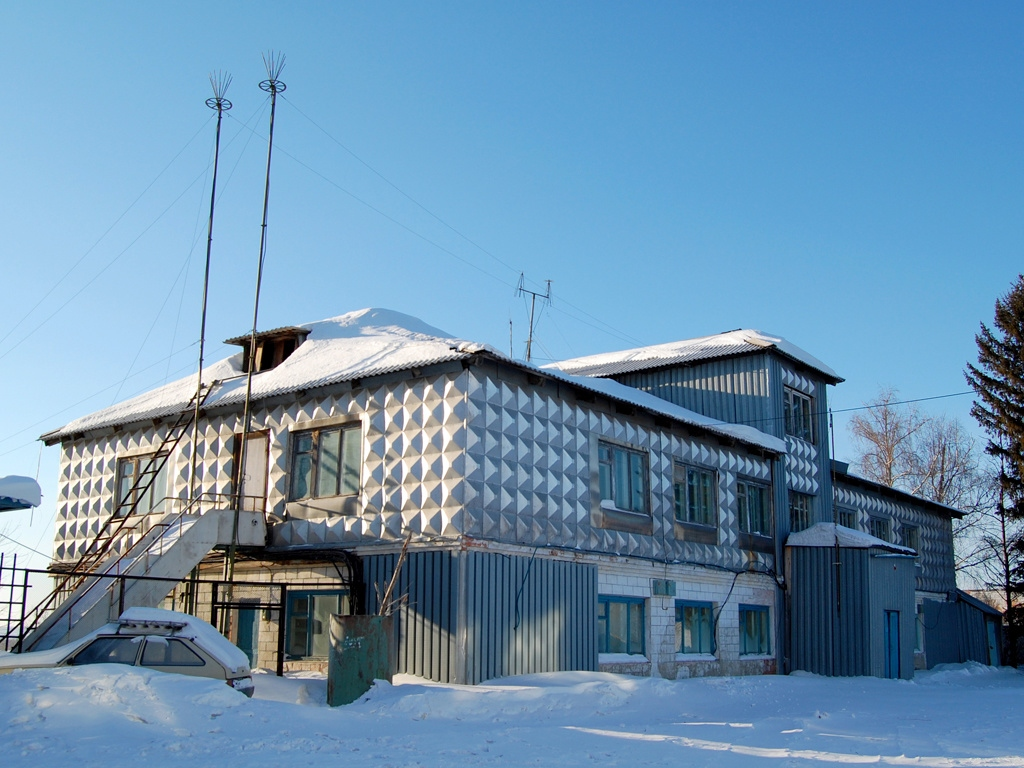
- IATA: ACS; ICAO: UNKS

Summary
- Airport type: joint
- Operator: "Airport "Achinsk" Ltd.
- Serves: Achinsk
- Elevation AMSL: 1,033 ft / 315 m
- Coordinates: 56°16′6″N 90°34′36″E
- Interactive map of Achinsk Airport

Runways
Direction	Length		Surface
Direction	ft	m	Surface
08/26	8,038	2,450	Concrete

Achinsk Airport (Russian: Аэропорт Ачинск) (IATA: ACS, ICAO: UNKS) is an air base in Krasnoyarsk Krai, Russia located 4 kilometres (2.5 mi) east of Achinsk. It is a civilian airfield with minor facilities for small number of fighter aircraft.

As of 2003 one source lists the 712th Guards Fighter Aviation Regiment at Kansk air base with Achinsk as a diversionary airfield.

On 30 March 2012, the new manager of the airport Valeri Gusarov outlined his plans for the future of the airport, including making airport operations all year round rather than seasonal and expanding the operations beyond the Krasnoyarsk region.

== See also ==
- List of airports in Russia
- List of military airbases in Russia
