= Ryazan Airport =

Airports in Ryazan are:

- Dyagilevo
- Protasovo air base
- Turlatovo Airport
