= 712th Guards Fighter Aviation Regiment =

The 712th Guards Fighter Aviation Regiment is a fighter aviation regiment of the Russian Aerospace Forces. Part of the 21st Mixed Aviation Division of the 14th Air and Air Defense Forces Army, the regiment is based at Kansk air base and flies the Mikoyan MiG-31BM.

The regiment was formed as the 40th Fighter Aviation Regiment in 1938 and saw combat in the Battle of Lake Khasan while stationed in the Soviet Far East before World War II. After Operation Barbarossa, the regiment was sent west. It became the 41st Guards Fighter Aviation Regiment in early 1943 in recognition of its actions in the Battle of the Caucasus. Postwar, it was renumbered as the 712th Guards Fighter Aviation Regiment in 1949.

== Prewar service ==
In connection with increasing tensions between Japan and the Soviet Union in the Far East, the 117th Fighter Aviation Squadron of the VVS Moscow Military District was transferred from Lyubertsy near Moscow to the Pokrovka airfield in Primorsky Krai on 7 October 1937. Under the command of Captain Kirichenko, the squadron joined the 69th Fighter Aviation Brigade. Between 27 June and 1 July 1938, in accordance with a People's Commissariat of Defense directive of 5 June 1938, the squadron and graduates of Air Force schools were used to form the 40th Fighter Aviation Regiment (IAP), which became part of the 53rd Aviation Brigade of the Air Force (VVS) of the Special Red Banner Far Eastern Army. Initially, two squadrons equipped with the I-16 and I-15bis were formed at Pokrovka, and soon afterwards they were joined by two squadrons of I-153 formed at the Baranovsky airfield near Ussuriysk. Captain D. K. Baranchuk was appointed commander of the regiment.

A month later, the regiment received its baptism of fire in the Battle of Lake Khasan against Japanese troops attempting to claim Soviet border regions. Between 6 and 12 August, two I-16 squadrons of the regiment, commanded by Captains A. B. Drozd and N. N. Dmitriyev, were committed to the battle, operating from the advanced airfield of Avgustovka. The remaining two squadrons were placed on alert at Pokrovka. Due to the lack of Japanese airpower in the battle, the combat missions of the regiment were changed and they instead patrolled the state border and escorted bombers attacking the Japanese forces at Lake Khasan. In the fighting, the regiment was credited with three Japanese aircraft destroyed and one damaged, while nineteen personnel of the 40th IAP were decorated.

The 40th IAP was transferred to the newly formed 72nd Fighter Aviation Brigade on 14 February 1939. In April, the 2nd squadron of the regiment under the command of Captain Kuzkin with I-15bis was transferred to the 41st Fighter Aviation Regiment on Kamchatka. The squadron was replaced in the 40th IAP by a new squadron under the command of Captain Kaftanov, formed from military school graduates who had arrived. In mid-1939, Japanese troops clashed with Soviet troops on the Mongolian border in the Battles of Khalkhin Gol. Between 15 July and 15 October, 40th IAP pilots Lieutenants S.A. Nazarenko, A.N. Degtyarenko, and N.M. Mentsyenzon provided air cover to Soviet troops without loss and were credited with one Japanese aircraft destroyed. An inspection carried out in late 1939 rated the combat readiness of the 40th IAP as satisfactory, but noted a high accident rate marked by the loss of two I-15 and two I-16. In one incident, 2nd squadron commander Captain Dmitriyev's I-16 crashed in bad weather.

In August 1940, the 72nd Fighter Aviation Brigade was disbanded and the regiment became part of the 33rd Mixed Aviation Division, which was itself disbanded by the end of the year. The regiment lost its two I-153 squadrons in December, the first being sent to the 34th Bomber Aviation Division while the second transferred to the 47th Fighter Aviation Regiment near Vladivostok at Zolotaya Dolina. To replace them, two I-16 squadrons were formed at Pokrovka. By the end of the year the 40th IAP with four squadrons shifted to the 70th Fighter Aviation Division (IAD).

== World War II ==
Operation Barbarossa, the German invasion of the Soviet Union, began on 22 June 1941. In response, the 40th was reinforced by ten pilots from the 5th and 305th IAPs on 5 July before being sent to the Soviet-German front in the west on the next day. The regiment fielded 63 I-16s under the command of Major Subbotin and chief of staff Major Bogachyov. At the time, the personnel of the regiment were considered highly experienced due to their participation in the border skirmishes against Japan. When it arrived in Ukraine, the regiment was reorganized by splitting it into two regiments between 7 and 15 August in accordance with an order of the Red Army Air Force on 3 August 1941 at Kupyansk: the 40th and 40th "A". The latter later became the 446th IAP, and the reorganized 40th IAP now included three squadrons. Relocated to the Stalino airfield near Donetsk, the regiment became part of the Donbass PVO Brigade Region of the Southern Front. From August to November, the regiment provided air defense against German bombing of Donetsk and factories in the Donbass. 3rd Squadron deputy commander Senior Lieutenant Dodonov became the first in the regiment to claim an aerial victory when he downed a Henschel Hs 126 in the vicinity of Tokmachka on 5 October. During this period, the 40th IAP flew 1,246 sorties in 1,226 total flying hours.

From 17 November to 6 December, two squadrons of the 40th under the command of Major S.P. Subbotin participated in the Battle of Rostov as part of the VVS 37th Army. In one air battle, future regimental commander Captain Aleksandr Pavlov distinguished himself in an action in which a flight of four I-16s covering ground troops were ambushed by nine German fighters. Captain Pavlov singlehandedly engaged four German aircraft, preventing them from finishing off a severely damaged I-16, allowing the latter to return to the airfield. For their actions, nineteen pilots of the regiment were decorated. The remaining squadron provided air defense for Kamensk-Shakhtinsky as part of the PVO Southern Front. The pilots of the 40th IAP conducted 464 combat sorties during this period and were credited with eleven aerial victories at the cost of one I-16. Intense fighting took place in the vicinity of Debaltsevo, Matveyev Kurgan, and Krasny Luch during mid-December, in which the 40th IAP played an active role, flying four to five sorties each day. Between 6 and 29 December, a total of 690 combat sorties were flown in which four aerial victories were claimed at the cost of two I-16s.

In the winter of 1941–1942, the 40th IAP provided air cover for Soviet troops in the Barvenkovo–Lozovaya offensive. Pilots of the regiment Pilipenko, Pavlov, Dodonov, Romanov, and Belikov distinguished themselves in these actions. From February to May 1942, the regiment flew 1,278 combat sorties, claimed 14 German aircraft downed, and lost three I-16s. In May, the regiment fought in the battles around Slavyansk and in the Second Battle of Kharkov. On 17 May, after German troops broke through the lines of the 9th Army, the regiment covered the Soviet withdrawal, attacking German positions in the Izyum–Barvenkovo operation and in battles on the Seversky Donets, at Lugansk, and Lysychansk. As the Soviet retreat continued through the summer, the regiment defended the crossings on the Don from German air attack. One such engagement over Rostov-on-Don on 22 July involved nine I-16s led by Captain Pilipenko engaging superior German numbers and claiming three downed without suffering losses. The regiment fought in the Battle of the Caucasus in the battles near Mozdok, Nalchik, and Prokhladny. On 2 October 1st Squadron commander Captain Pilipenko was shot down and killed during a mission with Dodonov to attack German aircraft on takeoff at the Soldatskaya airfield when both pilots were ambushed. Pilipenko was posthumously made a Hero of the Soviet Union in recognition of his thirteen aerial victories and 29 shared claims. From June to October, the 40th, as part of the 216th and 217th IADs of the Southern Front, made 2,714 combat sorties. They were credited with the destruction of 38 aircraft at the cost of five losses.

On 20 October, the 40th IAP flew to the Bozhigan airfield in the Kalmyk Steppe, where they were attached to the 4th Guards Cavalry Corps. The regiment supported the latter in raids against Axis communications, and with the corps between October 1942 and January 1943 advanced from the Caspian to Krasnodar, conducting 1,018 combat sorties and claiming two aerial victories without loss. In the winter of 1942–1943, the regiment, commanded by Major P.F. Chupikov, participated in the recapture of the Kuban as part of the North Caucasian Front. The regiment received replacement pilots and several I-153 fighters. An order of the NKO on 8 February 1943 gave the 40th IAP elite guards status as the 41st Guards IAP in recognition of its performance.

In late February, the regiment, handing its obsolete I-16s and I-153s over to the 84th IAP, was slated for conversion to the Lavochkin La-5. For this, on 25 February the personnel of the regiment were sent for retraining at Ivanovo. After two months of training, the regiment, with 32 new La-5s, was relocated to Buturlinovka and joined the Voronezh Front as part of the 8th Guards IAD. At the new base, the 41st GIAP immediately entered combat to repel air raids. As part of the 5th Fighter Aviation Corps of the 2nd Air Army, the regiment provided air defense for Kursk and Oboyan. They flew 335 sorties between May and July and were credited with 21 victories. In mid-1943, the regiment defended Voronezh and then participated in the Belgorod–Kharkov offensive. In this period the 41st GIAP flew 1,145 combat sorties, claiming 50 German aircraft downed at the cost of four La-5s lost. In the fall and winter of 1943 the regiment fought in the Battle of Kiev and the forcing of the Dnieper, the creation of a bridgehead on the right bank of the Dnieper and the recapture of Kiev. The 40th flew 500 combat sorties, claimed eighteen victories and lost one of its own aircraft.

In early 1944, the regiment received a large number of replacement pilots and several new Lavochkin La-7 fighters, and was out of combat instructing the new pilots until 10 March. In the spring and summer of 1944, the regiment supported the offensives of the 1st Ukrainian Front. During the battles for Proskurov and Ternopol and in the Lvov–Sandomierz offensive the 41st GIAP flew 1,314 combat sorties and was credited with destroying 32 German aircraft at the cost of five of its own. On 8 April, it was awarded the honorific Chernovitsy in recognition of its "courage and heroism" in the battles for the city. In January 1945, the regiment supported the 1st Ukrainian Front in the expansion of the Sandomierz bridgehead, flying 437 sorties. In late January, the regiment was moved forward to German territory and based at Groß Stein, operating as part of the 2nd Air Army of the front. On 19 February, the regiment was awarded the Order of Kutuzov, 3rd class, for its "exemplary performance of tasks at the front." Between January and May, the regiment supported Soviet operations in the Kraków and Częstochowa sectors and the Berlin Offensive. At the end of the war during the Prague offensive, twelve crews bombed fleeing German troops between 9 and 11 May. A total of 416 sorties were flown with the loss of three aircraft.

In total, during World War II the 41st GIAP was credited with 299 aircraft destroyed in air combat, 91 damaged, and 35 destroyed on the ground. In ground attacks, the regiment claimed to have destroyed 150 tanks, 3,210 armored vehicles and vehicles with infantry, fourteen trains, 19 freight cars, and inflicted more than 10,000 casualties. In addition, 100 crewed guns and 232 anti-aircraft guns and machine gun emplacements were claimed. The regiment lost 51 aircraft and 45 pilots. Eight pilots of the regiment received the title Hero of the Soviet Union and 684 were decorated. After the end of the war in Europe, the 2nd squadron of the regiment with twelve crews and mechanics under the command of Captain B.A. Kukuruzov was sent to the 18th Air Army in the Far East to fight in the Soviet invasion of Manchuria.

== Cold War ==
After the end of the war, the regiment remained at Groß Stein as part of the 5th Fighter Aviation Corps of the 2nd Air Army in the Group of Soviet Occupation Forces in Germany. The regiment continued to train pilots on the La-7 and in December 1945 was reorganized to a four-squadron structure. Three squadrons remained equipped with the La-5 while the fourth had twelve La-7s. In response to the beginning of the Cold War, the pace of training was increased. In 1946 3,220 training flights were made with a total of 1,774 hours compared to 1,512 and 105 hours in 1945. On 13 January 1947, regimental commander Pavlov was killed in a car accident while returning from a meeting at corps headquarters in Balatonalmádi, In August, the regiment received the new Lavochkin La-9 and was relocated from Germany to Hungary. Due to the fact that the new Székesfehérvár airfield was often flooded in the spring, the regiment only operated from there in the winter and during the rest of the year flew from camps at the Kenyeri airfield. By the end of the year, the pilots of the regiment were fully trained to fly the La-9 operationally with all four squadrons capable of daytime instrument flying while two squadrons were qualified to perform flights in difficult weather conditions in pairs or flights. 6,030 flights were performed during the year for a total of 3,060 training hours.

=== Baku sector ===
The 41st GIAP was relocated to Adzhikabul airfield in Kazi-Magomed, Azerbaijan in accordance with a General Staff directive of 15 November 1947. The first three echelons of the regiment with equipment left Hungary on 12 December. The relocation was completed in two months and on 14 February 1948 the regiment joined the 7th Air Army of the Transcaucasian Military District. At its new base, the regiment was tasked with providing air defense for Baku against bombing raids. By the end of the year, the regiment conducted 960 aerial firings and 873 mock air battles, with 3,880 flight hours made in training flights. The regiment was given higher priority due to its interceptor role with an increased number of inspections and readiness checks carried out during 1948. In accordance with a General Staff directive of 10 January 1949 renumbering Soviet Air Force units, the 41st GIAP was renumbered as the 712th Guards Fighter Aviation Regiment on 15 February of that year. In April, the regiment was reorganized to consist of three squadrons, and the 4th Squadron with 52 personnel and 12 La-9s was transferred to the 271st IAP. In the summer, the 2nd squadron carried out a joint exercise with the 99th Separate Long-Range Reconnaissance Aviation Regiment in which its La-9s were used as radio repeaters to transmit information.

At the end of the year, personnel of the regiment began retraining on jet fighters in preparation for the conversion of the regiment to the Mikoyan-Gurevich MiG-15 jet fighter. The jet age began for the regiment on 13 March 1950 when Lieutenant Colonel Yurchenko made the first flight of an MiG-15bis over Adzhikabul. In the following year, 42 pilots of the 712th successfully completed retraining on the MiG-15 and went on alert duty to provide air defense in the Baku Air Defense District. The 712th GIAP was officially transferred to the now independent Soviet Air Defense Forces (PVO) on 30 September. Part of the regiment's mission included defending Soviet airspace over the Caspian Sea against United States Air Force and Imperial Iranian Air Force reconnaissance aircraft testing the effectiveness of Soviet air defense systems. During 1950, the regiment made 65 alert sorties of which 48 involved visual contact with the opposing aircraft. Continuing to operate the La-9, the regiment finished its first year with jets without accidents: 2,860 hours were flown in 1950, of which 337 were in difficult weather and 393 at night.

Continued incursions over the Caspian necessitated the creation of two flights of aircraft specifically tasked with patrolling the state border over the Caspian. The alert system in Adzhikabul was changed in 1952 so that one MiG-15bis flight would be at normal and increased readiness during the way and at night one crew would be at normal readiness while three crews were placed on increased readiness. During the year, 327 interception sorties were made, of which 295 made visual contact, while the 712th GIAP pilots flew a total of 3,287 hours. Over the next two years, 30 pilots of the regiment converted to the replacement Mikoyan-Gurevich MiG-17 interceptor. In June 1954, the regiment was relocated to the Salyany airfield and became part of the 174th Guards Fighter Aviation Division of the Baku Air Defense District. Every year, the regiment participated in tactical flight and command post exercises to maintain its combat readiness.

The first jet accident in the regiment was a fatal MiG-17 crash in April 1955 and it was followed by two more fatal MiG-17 crashes in January 1956 and March 1957, one of which was attributed to manufacturing defects. A fatal MiG-15UTI crash occurred during a training flight in March 1957 due to instrument failure. In January and February 1956, two crews of the regiment were tasked with destroying an unusually high number of reconnaissance balloons drifting through the regimental air defense zone, launched from Turkey under Project Genetrix. The regiment received MiG-17P interceptors in early 1958, which immediately participated in two major PVO exercises. In one of these, the regiment with its full complement of aircraft was relocated to the Chelyabinsk Shagol airfield to reinforce the Ural Military District, from which it carried out live fire sorties against air and ground targets for two weeks. The regiment's annual flights during the year amounted to 3,560 hours, of which 515 were at night and 765 in difficult weather.

=== Siberia ===
During mid-1959, in accordance with a 3 June 1959 directive of the PVO Commander-in-Chief, the 712th GIAP was relocated to Kansk-Tsentralny airfield in Krasnoyarsk Krai, where it become part of the 56th Air Defense Corps of the Siberian Military District. The pilots of the regiment made the long flight to Kansk on their MiG-17Ps, MiG-17s, and MiG-15UTIs with multiple refueling stops. At the new base, the conversion to the MiG-17P continued, and Belaya, Bratsk, and Krasnoyarsk were established as diversionary airfields. In 1961, the regiment was placed on alert status with the MiG-17P to patrol Soviet airspace from Kansk-Tsentralny and Belaya. While flying from Krasnoyarsk in August 1961, a MiG-15UTI crashed due to equipment failure; its crew ejected safely. In 1962, the regiment trained 16 out of 28 pilots to fly at night in difficult weather in addition to normal day and night flying. While the Tsentralny airfield was being improved, the regiment was based at the unpaved Kansk-Dalny airfield between 15 May and 1 October 1963.

== Russian service ==
As of 2003 one source lists the 712th GIAP at Kansk air base with Achinsk Airport as a diversionary airfield.

During the 2009 reform of the Russian Air Force, the 712th GIAP was merged with support units to form the 6979th Guards Aviation Base of the 2nd category on 1 June 2009. The base became part of the 9th Aerospace Defense Brigade of the 14th Air and Air Defense Forces Army. As the organizational changes continued the base was soon reassigned to the 2nd Air and Air Defense Forces Command on 1 December of that year. Further consolidation in November 2010 resulted in the reorganization of the base into an aviation group of the 6980th Guards Aviation Base of the 1st category at Chelyabinsk Shagol. The former 712th GIAP was referred to as the Kansk Aviation Group during this period, and its banner was sent to the Central Armed Forces Museum for storage, temporarily ending the lineage of the 712th.

The 712th GIAP became part of the 21st Mixed Aviation Division of the 14th Air and Air Defense Forces Army by October 2018, when the Russian Ministry of Defense announced the formation of the division.
