= Vorotynsk =

Vorotynsk (Russian: Воротынск) is the name of several inhabited localities in Russia.

== Urban localities ==
- Vorotynsk (urban-type settlement), Babyninsky District, Kaluga Oblast

== Rural localities ==
- Vorotynsk, Peremyshlsky District, Kaluga Oblast, a former ancient Russian city
- Vorotynsk, Oryol Oblast, a selo in Lyutovsky Selsoviet of Livensky District of Oryol Oblast

== Air base ==
- Vorotynsk (air base)

== See also ==
- Vorotynsky District, an administrative district of Nizhny Novgorod Oblast
- Vorotynsky, a Rurikid princely house of Muscovite Russia
