= 2026 Russian Air Force Antonov An-12 crash =

2026 aviation accident

- A Russian Air Force Antonov An-12, similar to the aircraft involved

Accident
- Date: 17 November 2026
- Summary: Crashed during emergency landing possibly due to In-flight fire; under investigation
- Site: Yagunovo, Kemerovo Oblast, Russia

Aircraft
- Aircraft type: Antonov An-12BK
- Operator: Russian Air Force
- Registration: Unknown
- Flight origin: Tolmachevo Airport, Novosibirsk Oblast, Russia
- Destination: Kansk Air Base, Krasnoyarsk Krai, Russia
- Occupants: 19
- Fatalities: 19
- Survivors: 0

On November 17, 2026, an Antonov An-12 aircraft from the Russian Air Force had crashed while on a military transport flight in Russia from Tolmachevo Airport, Novosibirsk Oblast, to Kansk Air Base, Krasnoyarsk Krai. The crash happened while attempting an emergency landing after an in-flight fire broke out, killing all 19 on board. The cause of the crash remains unknown.

== Background ==
The aircraft involved was an Antonov An-12BK, whose registration is still unknown.

The aircraft was transporting 19 people, both crew members and soldiers, and spare parts.

== Accident ==
The aircraft was on a military transport flight in Russia from Tolmachevo Airport, Novosibirsk Oblast, to Kansk Air Base, Krasnoyarsk Krai. A fire had occurred on board, which had started from one of the engines and disabled wing systems. The pilots declared an emergency, and managed to deviate the plane from a residential area and crashed near the village of Yagunovo, at around 9:30 pm local time.

According to the Russian news channel Baza the aircraft had a fuel leak, which is indicated as the source of the on-board fire, and was attempting to make an emergency landing at the nearby Alexei Leonov Kemerovo International Airport. The Russian Minister of Defence later issued a statement, in which they supported the mechanical issue theory and updated the death toll to 19.

== Response ==
An emergency response center was set up in Yagunovo to help emergency crew to manage the situation. The governor of Kemerovo Oblast, Ilya Seredyuk, deployed troops of the National Guard of Russia to the crash site.

A legal investigation was started after the crash for a possible violation of flight safety norms.

== See also ==
- 1968 Indian Air Force An-12 crash
- 2026 in aviation
- Meridian Flight 3032
