= Alexandrovo =

Alexandrovo or Aleksandrovo may refer to:

- Alexandrovo-Gaysky District, an administrative and municipal district (raion) in Saratov Oblast, Russia
- Alexandrovo-Zavodsky District, an administrative and municipal district (raion) in Zabaykalsky Krai, Russia
- Alexandrovo air base or Protasovo air base, an air base near Ryazan, Russia, disbanded 1992, now hosting the Ryazan Aeroclub
