= Bogdan Khitrovo =

Russian boyar (died 1680)

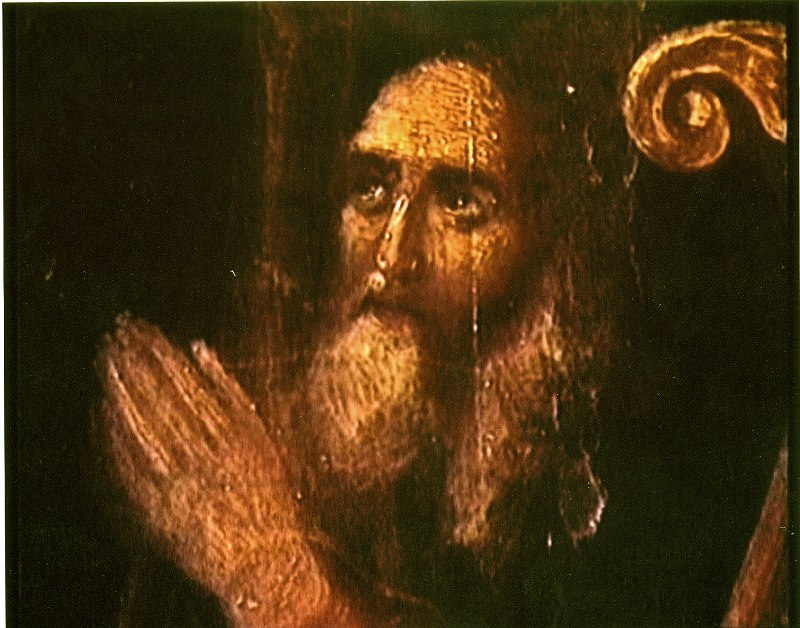
Alleged portrait from an icon

Bogdan Matveyevich Khitrovo (Russian: Богдан Матвеевич Хитрово; c. 1615 – 27 March 1680) was a Russian statesman, favorite and boyar who served under Tsar Alexis of Russia and his son Feodor III, supporting the party of Maria Miloslavskaya. He is also noted for his patronage of icon-painter Simon Ushakov and Simeon of Polotsk, the first Russian poet.

== Life ==
It appears likely that Khitrovo was born in Grigoryevskoye, his father's estate in the region of Kaluga. He later would endow the Lyutikov Monastery in nearby Vorotynsk with a number of generous gifts, including an icon featuring his own portrait. He made a name for himself in the mid-1640s as a governor of Temnikov. At that time he established a chain of forts along the Volga River, including Simbirsk, which has an equestrian monument in his honor.

Starting in 1648, Khitrovo pursued a brilliant career at court. He was in charge of many prikazes between 1649 and 1664 and he held the office of Master of Arms, or Lord of the Kremlin Armoury, from 1654 until his death. This position allowed him to oversee the activities of major icon-painters in the employ of the Tsar. In the face of opposition from such eminent personages as Avvakum, Khitrovo encouraged the artists' interest in Western art, which resulted in an unprecedented flowering of naturalism in Russian icon-painting.

Khitrovo was related through his mother to the powerful Fyodor Rtishchev, with whom he shared a keen interest in Western culture and a penchant for philanthropy. He led Russian forces during a prolonged war with Poland and took part in the negotiations that led to the Treaty of Andrusovo. During the last 16 years of his life he performed the task of administering the Kremlin palaces, as well as other state estate, including several million of serfs. He died in the spring of 1680.

The old boyar made a bequest of the Khitrovo Gospel, as well as other books and icons, to the Troitse-Sergiyeva Lavra and other monasteries. According to his will, all his kholops (slaves) were set free. His tomb is in the crypt of the Novodevichy Convent cathedral.

== Sources ==
- "Хитрово, Богдан Матвеевич" . Brockhaus and Efron Encyclopedic Dictionary (in Russian). 1906.
- Bushkovitch, Paul (27 September 2001). Peter the Great: The Struggle for Power, 1671–1725. Cambridge University Press. ISBN 978-1-139-43075-3.
