= Krichev (air base) =

Airport in Belarus

Krichev Krychaw
- Krychaw, Klimavichy District, Mogilev Region in Belarus

Site information
- Type: Air Base
- Owner: Armed Forces of Belarus

Location
- Shown within Belarus
- Coordinates: 53°44′05″N 031°55′02″E

Site history
- Built: 1949
- In use: 1949–1993

Airfield information
- Identifiers: ICAO: ZF19
- Elevation: 174 metres (571 ft) AMSL
Runways
Direction	Length and surface
04/22	2,500 metres (8,202 ft) Concrete

Krichev is a military air base in the Mogilev Region, Belarus. It is located in Klimavichy District, 13 kilometres (8.1 mi) east of the city of Krychaw. The base served the interceptor air defense role for the Soviet Air Defence Force, hosted by the 28th Fighter Aviation Regiment, 2nd Air Defence Corps, Moscow Air Defence District.

== History ==
Krichev had been observed by 1957 by Western Lockheed U-2 overflights. The 28th IAP operated the Sukhoi Su-9 (NATO: Fishpot) regiment in the 1960s and 1970s. By 1981, the regiment was one of four in the USSR still operating the Su-9 but its facilities were being upgraded, and it received the Mikoyan-Gurevich MiG-25 (NATO: Foxbat) in the mid-1980s.

The base was closed in 1993, after the Cold War, and the aviation regiment was disbanded. All the buildings were razed to the ground; little remains except for the overgrown runway.

In December 2025, Reuters reported that Russia was likely deploying Oreshnik intermediate-range ballistic missiles at the air base.
