= 16th Guards Fighter Aviation Division =

- Active: 1942–1998
- Country: Soviet Union
- Allegiance: Soviet Air Force; 16th Air Army
- Role: Air superiority
- Size: Division
- Garrison/HQ: Damgarten, GDR (until 1993)

The 16th Guards Fighter Aviation Division was an Aviation Division of the Soviet Air Forces, active from 1942 to 1998. Originally activated in 1942 as the 258th Fighter Aviation Division from the Air Forces of the 14th Army, then the 258th Mixed Aviation Division 27.2.43; redesignated in accordance with NKO Decree No. 264 as the 1st Guards Composite Aviation Division от 24.08.43; redesignated 16th Guards Fighter Aviation Division (16 GvIAD) 11 November 1944.

== World War II ==
Active regiments within the 16th Fighter Aviation Division during the Second World War included:

- 17th Guards Assault Aviation Regiment (ГШАП, GShAP)
- 19th Guards Fighter Aviation Regiment (ГИАП, GIAP) (26.11.42 - 13.01.45)
- 20th Guards Fighter Aviation Regiment (26.11.42 - 13.01.45)
- 114th Guards Bomber Aviation Regiment (ГБАП, GBAP)
- 152nd Fighter Aviation Regiment (ИАП, IAP) (06.44 - 13.01.45)
- 668th Assault Aviation Regiment (ШАП, ShAP)
- 773rd Fighter Aviation Regiment (09.44 - 13.01.45)
- 858th Fighter Aviation Regiment (08.44 - ...)

From 1945 to 1949 the division included: The 19th Guards Fighter Aviation Regiment, 20th Guards Fighter Aviation Regiment, and 152nd Fighter Aviation Regiment. During this period 152 IAP disbanded and was replaced by 773 IAP. Beginning with its formation from the 258th Aviation Division, until February 1945 The 16th Fighter Aviation Division was attached to the 14th Army. After this, it was then reassigned to the Belomorsky Military District where it served until 1953. In 1953 it was rolled into the 16th Air Army as part of the Group of Soviet Forces in Germany. The 16th Division headquarters were located at Damgarten from the unit's installation in Germany during October 1953 until the Soviet forces pulled out of the area subsequent to the Reunification of Germany which was finalized in 1993. As a frontline unit stationed in Germany during the Cold War it can be assumed that the 16th Fighter Aviation Division would have faced off against any action taken by NATO air forces in Allied Air Forces Central Europe in the event of conflict between the Soviet Union and NATO.

== Organisation 1960 ==
- 19th Guards Fighter Aviation Regiment (Wittstock, Germany) with MiG-15/17
- 20th Guards Fighter Aviation Regiment (Parchim, Germany) with MiG-17
- 773rd Fighter Aviation Regiment (Damgarten, Germany) with MiG-17

Two regiments were converted to Fighter-Bomber Aviation Regiments (19th Guards and 20th Guards) in 1961, and were replaced by two Fighter Aviation Regiments (33rd and 787th), from the 125th Fighter Aviation Division.

== Structure in the GDR in 1990 ==
- 33rd Fighter Aviation Regiment (Wittstock) (MiG-29)
- 773rd Fighter Aviation Regiment (Damgarten) (MiG-29) (returned to Andreapol in 1994 and later absorbed by 28th Guards Fighter Aviation Regiment)
- 787th Fighter Aviation Regiment (Finow)

The division remained as part of Group of Soviet Forces in Germany until October 1993.

== Composition 1995 in the North Caucasus ==
- 19th Guards Fighter Aviation Regiment, at Millerovo (MiG-29)
- 31st Guards Fighter Aviation Regiment, at Zernograd (MiG-29)

It was finally disbanded after serving several years with 4th Air Army in May 1998 while at Millerovo in the North Caucasus Military District.
