= Kosteryovo =

Town in Vladimir Oblast, Russia

Kosteryovo Костерёво
- Town
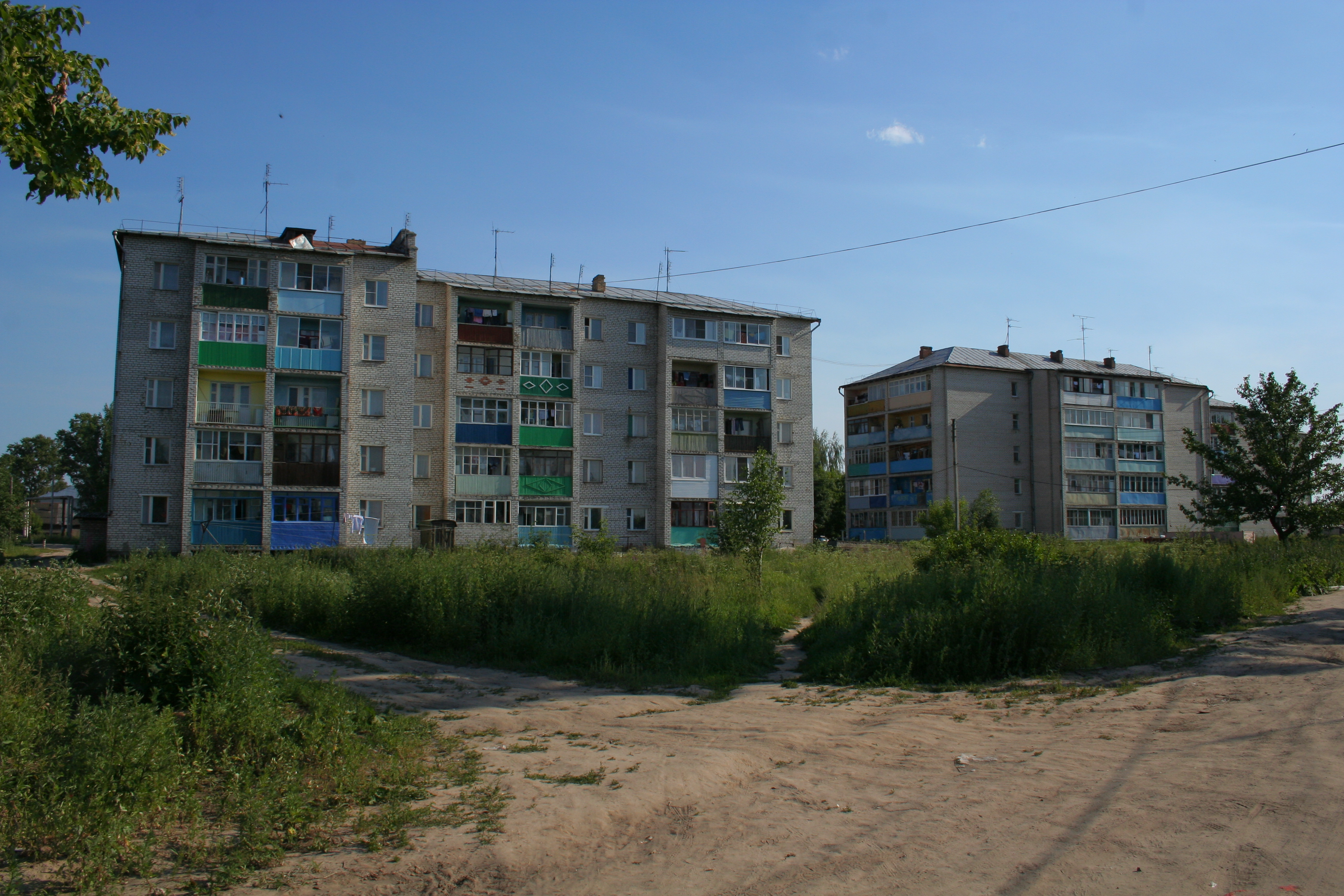
- A residential area in Kosteryovo

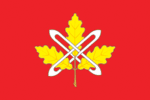
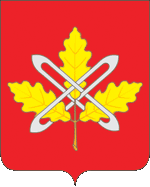
- Flag Coat of arms
- Interactive map of Kosteryovo
- Location of Kosteryovo Kosteryovo (Vladimir Oblast)
- Coordinates: 55°55′N 39°33′E
- Country: Russia
- Federal subject: Vladimir Oblast
- Administrative district: Petushinsky District
- Founded: 1890
- Town status since: 1981
- Elevation: 115 m (377 ft)

Population (2010 Census)
  - Total: 9,073
  - Estimate (2021): 7,113 (−21.6%)

Municipal status
  - Municipal district: Petushinsky Municipal District
  - Urban settlement: Kosteryovo Urban Settlement
  - Capital of: Kosteryovo Urban Settlement
- Time zone: UTC+3 (MSK)
- Postal code: 601110
- OKTMO ID: 17646110001
- Website: www.kosterevo.ru

Kosteryovo (Russian: Костерёво) is a town in Petushinsky District of Vladimir Oblast, Russia, located on the Lipnya River (Klyazma's tributary), 52 kilometers (32 mi) west of Vladimir, the administrative center of the oblast. Population: 7,113 (2021 census); 9,073 (2010 census); 9,608 (2002 census); 11,777 (1989 Soviet census).

== History ==
It was founded as a settlement serving the railway station of the same name, which opened in 1890. It was granted town status in 1981.

== Administrative and municipal status ==
Within the framework of administrative divisions, Kosteryovo is directly subordinated to Petushinsky District. As a municipal division, the town of Kosteryovo is incorporated within Petushinsky Municipal District as Kosteryovo Urban Settlement.

== Facilities ==
There is a cultural center, a museum, and a music school in the town.
