= Vorotynsk (urban-type settlement) =

Urban locality in Kaluga Oblast, Russia

Coordinates: 54°28′06″N 36°02′33″E

Vorotynsk (Russian: Воротынск) is an urban-type settlement in Babyninsky District, Kaluga Oblast, Russia. Population: 10,667 (2021 census); 11,288 (2010 census); 11,099 (2002 census); . The settlement hosts the former military airfield named Oreshkovo.
