= Varfolomeyevka =

Varfolomeyevka may refer to:

- Varfolomeyevka (village), Primorsky Krai, a village (selo) in Primorsky Krai, Russia
- Varfolomeyevka (air base), a Cold War air base close to Varfolomeyevka, Primorsky Krai
- Varfolomeyevka (railway station), Primorsky Krai, a railway station incorporated as an inhabited locality in Primorsky Krai, Russia
- Varfolomeyevka, Saratov Oblast, a village (selo) in Saratov Oblast, Russia
