= Kenyeri =

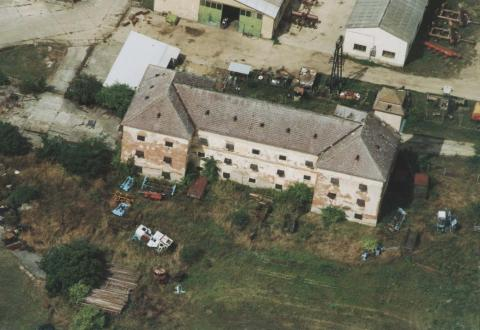
- Aerial photography of Kenyeri.

- Location of Vas county in Hungary

- Location of Kenyeri
- Coordinates: 47.38558°N 17.09144°E
- Country: Hungary
- County: Vas

Government
  - Mayor: Horváth Zsolt (Ind.)

Area
  - Total: 33.96 km^{2} (13.11 sq mi)

Population (2022)
  - Total: 790
  - Density: 23/km^{2} (60/sq mi)
- Time zone: UTC+1 (CET)
  - Summer (DST): UTC+2 (CEST)
- Postal code: 9514
- Area code: 95

Kenyeri is a village in Vas county, Hungary.
