= 28th Guards Fighter Aviation Regiment =

- Active: 1942-c.2009
- Country: Soviet Union, Russia
- Branch: Soviet Air Force, Russian Air Force
- Engagements: World War II: Operation Bagration; East Prussian Offensive; Korean War
- Decorations: Order of Kutuzov 3rd class
- Battle honours: Leningrad

Commanders
- Notable commanders: Alexey Smirnov

28th Guards Leningrad Order of Kutuzov Fighter Aviation Regiment (28th GIAP) (Russian: 28-й гвардейский истребительный авиационный Ленинградский ордена Кутузова полк (28-й гв. иап)) was an aviation regiment of the Soviet Air Forces during the Second World War, the Korean War, and became part of the Russian Air Force after 1991.

The regiment was formed in 1940 as the 153rd Fighter Aviation Regiment (IAP) (153-и ИАП). In November 1942, by order of the People's Commissariat for Defence, it was awarded the title of a Guards unit, and became the 28th Guards Fighter Aviation Regiment. In 1950 it was dispatched to North Korea.

Initially, the regiment was equipped with I-153 and MiG-3 fighters. In 1942 it was re-equipped with P-39 Airacobra, then with Yak-15s, MiG-9s, MiG-15s, MiG-17s, MiG-19s, Su-15s, and then finally with MiG-23Ps and MiG-29s.

The regiment lost 64 pilots and 94 aircraft in World War II. The regiment fought in the Korean War from June 22, 1950, to October 29, 1951. During its deployment, it lost three aircraft.

It served with 2nd Air Defence Corps, Moscow Air Defence District, Soviet Air Defence Forces until 1994.

The 33rd Fighter Aviation Regiment (33 IAP) returned to Andreapol in Russia from Wittstock (and briefly at Damgarten) in Germany, under the 16th Guards Fighter Aviation Division.

In April 1994, the 33rd and 733rd Fighter Aviation Regiments from the 16th Air Army in Germany were withdrawn to Andreapol with their 49 MiG-29s. At Andreapol, both regiments were merged under the 28th Guards Fighter Aviation Regiment, which received their MiG-29 aircraft to replace its aging MiG-23P aircraft. The regiment was disbanded in late 2009 during the reform of the Russian Armed Forces.

There were earlier reports about the exact evolution of the regiment's status. Michael Holm said that the regiment absorbed the 773rd Fighter Aviation Regiment when it returned in 1994. Piotr Butowski, writing in International Air Power Review, Vol. 13, Summer 2004, says that the regiment was disbanded. Butowski goes on to say that the number and traditions of the 28 Gv IAP were taken up by the 33 IAP.

== World War II ==
The 153rd Fighter Aviation Regiment was formed between 23 and 26 January 1940 at Kubinka airfield in the Moscow Military District. The regiment was equipped with I-153 biplane fighters transferred from the 11th and 24th IAPs and formed part of the 2nd Aviation Brigade of the Air Force (VVS) of the Moscow Military District. The regiment received 65 I-153 fighters between 27 January and 13 February. It was sent to Karkku in the Karelian Isthmus to fight in the Winter War on 14 February. entering combat on 23 February under the VVS of the 15th Army. By the end of the war on 13 March, the regiment flew 1,064 combat sorties without loss. After the end of the war, the 153rd IAP became part of the 59th Fighter Aviation Brigade of the VVS Leningrad Military District in April. The brigade was reorganized as the 5th Mixed Aviation Division (SAD) on 25 June 1940. With the latter, the 153rd IAP had 61 I-153, of which seven were unserviceable, three I-16, two I-15bis, and 35 MiG-3 when Operation Barbarossa began on 22 June 1941; the VVS Leningrad Military District became the VVS Northern Front on the outbreak of the war. The regiment was in the process of re-equipping with the MiG-3 and the pilots of the regiment had not yet become experienced with the aircraft, but the 153rd began flying combat sorties with its I-153s and MiG-3s. The first regimental victory claim of the war, a Bf 109 shot down over Parikkala, was credited to a MiG-3 pair led by Captain Georgy Larionov on 30 June. The regiment was commanded by Captain Mikhail Chernykh from June.

When the Northern Front was split on 23 August, the 153rd IAP and the 5th SAD became part of the VVS Leningrad Front. It was reinforced by an MiG-3 squadron from the 7th IAP on 4 October. During the month, Major (promoted to Lieutenant Colonel) Sergey Mironov became regimental commander. By 1 December, the 153rd had been reduced to just five I-16s, of which three were unserviceable, six I-153s of which three were unserviceable, and four MiG-3s. By 31 December, it had a strength of five I-16s, of which two were unserviceable, one I-153, and nine MiG-3s, all unserviceable. When the 5th SAD was disbanded on 22 February 1942, the regiment became part of the VVS of the 23rd Army of the front. The much reduced 153rd IAP was withdrawn from the front for rebuilding on 11 March, having flown 5,170 combat sorties since the war began with the loss of 37 aircraft and 24 pilots. The rebuilding was conducted under the 22nd Reserve Aviation Regiment of the Moscow Military District at Ivanovo. The regiment was reorganized under shtat 015/174 while it was rebuilt and re-equipped with the American Lend-Lease P-39 Airacobra between 22 March and 12 June.

The 153rd iAP returned to combat on 28 June with the 244th Bomber Aviation Division of the 2nd Air Army of the Bryansk Front, tasked with escorting the bombers of the division. Together with the division and army, the 153rd IAP was among the units included in the newly formed Voronezh Front on 7 July. With the Voronezh Front, the regiment flew 1,070 sorties with the loss of eight aircraft and three pilots. By a special directive of the VVS Command, the regiment contributed a special group of eight pilots and 28 mechanics to the 202nd Fighter Aviation Division (IAD) of the 1st Air Army of the Western Front on 7 August. The group assigned to the 202nd IAD flew 167 sorties with the loss of two aircraft during this period. Major (later Lieutenant Colonel) Oleg Rodionov became regimental commander on 15 September. The regiment was withdrawn from the front for rebuilding on 25 September. It was reorganized under shtat 015/284, again with the 22nd Reserve iAP, between 29 September and 29 October. The 3rd squadron of the regiment was formed from personnel of the disbanded 185th IAP.

Returning to the Northwestern Front on 30 October 1942, the regiment joined the 239th IAD of the 6th Air Army. For its "exemplary completion of combat missions" and "demonstrated courage and heroism," the 153rd IAP was converted into the elite 28th Guards iAP on 22 November. The 239th IAD became the 5th Guards IAD on 18 March 1943. The regiment was awarded the honorific Leningrad on 4 May for its "courage and heroism" in battle. During its time with the Northwestern Front, the regiment flew 1,662 combat sorties with the loss of nineteen aircraft and twelve pilots. On 28 September, it was placed under the operational control of the 3rd Air Army of the Kalinin Front. The regiment was reorganized under shtat 015/364 between 1 and 28 October. During this period, the Kalinin Front was renamed the 1st Baltic Front on 20 October, and the regiment flew 573 sorties with the loss of eight aircraft and a single pilot under the front. With the 5th Guards IAD, the 28th Guards IAP was transferred to the 15th Air Army of the 2nd Baltic Front on 11 December, flying 49 sorties without loss under the 15th Air Army.

Together with the division, the regiment was transferred to the 11th Fighter Aviation Corps of the RVGK on 13 January 1944. It would not see combat again until 3 June, when the division and corps joined the 3rd Air Army of the 1st Baltic Front. With the 1st Baltic Front. the 28th Guards IAP flew 4,413 combat sorties with the loss of nineteen aircraft and eleven pilots. Major (later Lieutenant Colonel) Boris Melekhin became the final wartime regimental commander on 2 October; he would remain in the position until 1949. The 28th Guards IAP was awarded the Order of Kutuzov, 3rd class, on 22 October in recognition of its "exemplary completion of command tasks" in the breakthrough of German defenses southeast of Riga. With the 3rd Air Army, the regiment was transferred to the Zemland Group of Forces on 25 February 1945. Just days before the war ended on 9 May, the regiment was transferred with its division and corps to the 15th Air Army of the Leningrad Front on 5 May after the Zemland Group of Forces was disbanded. Since its transfer to the Zemland Group of Forces and during the final months of war, the regiment flew 1,199 combat sorties with the loss of four aircraft and a single pilot.

During the war, the regiment flew a total of 14,303 combat sorties, the majority of which were either on escort missions or providing air cover to ground troops. The 153rd and 28th Guards IAPs were credited with the destruction of 511 German aircraft during the war, mostly in air battles between 1943 and 1945. The regiment lost 127 aircraft during the war: 28 I-153, seven I-16, ten MiG-3, 80 Airacobras, one UTI-4, and one U-2. 94 of these losses occurred during combat. For aircraft losses, 1941 was the deadliest year with a total of 45 aircraft lost compared to 30 in 1943 and 32 in 1944. A total of 64 pilots were lost, of which 24 were recorded as killed in combat and 20 missing in action.

== Cold War ==
Postwar, the regiment began re-equipping with the Yakovlev Yak-15 jet fighter in June 1947. The regiment received its first eight MiG-9 fighters on 24 October of that year, and began retraining for the MiG-9 on 12 February 1948. The 28th Guards IAP received 42 MiG-9 fighters between July and August of that year. With the 5th Guards IAD, it relocated from Kaliningrad Oblast to the Migalovo airfield in the Moscow Air Defence District between 9 and 19 September of that year. The regiment began receiving the Mikoyan-Gurevich MiG-15 in November 1949, handing its MiG-9s over to the 328th IAD PVO. With the 151st Guards IAD, renumbered from the 5th Guards IAD in 1949, the regiment was sent to China with its division on 22 June 1950. After arriving in Manchuria, the regiment participated in the Korean War between 1 November 1950 and 2 April 1951 as part of the 64th Fighter Aviation Corps, the Soviet aerial intervention in the Korean War. The regiment flew about 700 combat sorties during this period, in which roughly 30 air battles were conducted. The regiment was credited with shooting down 36 UN aircraft and eleven probables, while losing four aircraft and three pilots killed.

The division was rotated out of the intervention in the Korean War in October 1951, with the 28th Guards IAP transferring to Klin in the Moscow Air Defence District under the 88th IAK PVO. Together with the division. the regiment was transferred to the 56th IAK PVO in 1952. In September 1956, the regiment was transferred to the 17th IAD PVO. When the division disbanded in August 1960, the regiment became part of the 2nd Air Defence Corps of the Moscow Air Defence District. According to 19 November 1990 data released under the Treaty on Conventional Armed Forces in Europe, the regiment included 38 MiG-23s.

== Russian service ==
In April 1994, the 33rd and 733rd Fighter Aviation Regiments from the 16th Air Army in Germany were withdrawn to Andreapol with their 49 MiG-29s. At Andreapol, both regiments were merged to form a new 28th Guards IAP in 1994 with their MiG-29s replacing the aging MiG-23Ps of the original 28th Guards IAP, inheriting the lineage of the original. According to CFE Treaty data, the regiment had a strength of 660 personnel and 70 MiG-29s at the beginning of 2000. The reductions of the 1990s saw changes in the command structure of the regiment, with it being transferred to the 239th Fighter Aviation Division of the 76th Air Army on 9 June 1994. When the Air Defence Forces were eliminated as an independent branch, the regiment became part of the 5th Air Defence Division of the Moscow Air and Air Defence Forces District on 15 March 1998. This division became the 5th Air Defence Division on 19 April 1999, part of the 16th Mixed Aviation Corps. The corps was given air army status on 1 February 2002 and on 1 September of that year the Moscow District was reorganized as the Special Purpose Command. Accordingly, the regiment was ultimately part of the 16th Air Army of the Special Purpose Command. The regiment was disbanded in late 2009 during the reform of the Russian Armed Forces.

== Commanders ==
- Major Sergei Mironov (August 1941-October 1942)
- Lieutenant Colonel O. M. Rodionov (October 1942)
- Major Alexey Smirnov

== Heroes of the Soviet Union and the Russian Federation ==
- Alexei S. Smirnov (twice: 28 September 1943 and 23 February 1945)
- Captain Aleksandr Avdeyev (10 February 1943, posthumous)
- Major Makarenko Nikolay F. (10 February 1943)
- Guard Captain Anatoly Kislyakov (18 August 1945)
- Guard Captain Mazurin Fedor Kravchuk (18 August 1945)
- Guard Lieutenant Pasko Nikolai Fedorovich (18 August 1945)
