= Dorokhovo (air base) =

Air base in Russia

Dorokhovo Bezhetsk-Dorokhov
- Bezhetsk, Tver Oblast in Russia
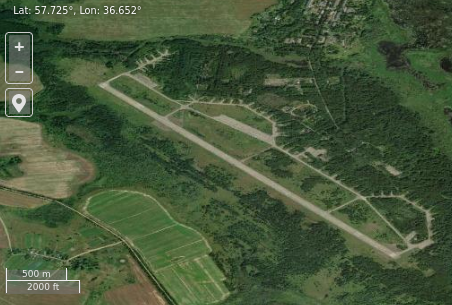
- Satellite imagery of Dorokhovo air base

Site information
- Type: Air Base
- Owner: Ministry of Defence
- Operator: Russian Air Force

Location
- Shown within Tver Oblast Dorokhovo (Russia)
- Coordinates: 57°43′30″N 36°39′6″E

Site history
- In use: 1953 - 2009

Airfield information
- Elevation: 143 metres (469 ft) AMSL
Runways
Direction	Length and surface
13/31	2,500 metres (8,202 ft) Concrete

Dorokhovo (also Bezhetsk, Bezhetsk, or Dorokhov) is a former air base in Bezhetsky District of Tver Oblast, Russia, located 7 km southwest of Bezhetsk. It was a small interceptor base with about 10 alert pads for fighter aircraft and some other pads and tarmac space. In 1967 it received some of the first Sukhoi Su-15 (Flagon) interceptors.

It was home to 611th Fighter Aviation Regiment (611 IAP) flying 39 Sukhoi Su-15 aircraft in the 1970s and Sukhoi Su-27 aircraft by the 1990s. It also had MiG-31 aircraft. From the 1960s to the 1990s the regiment was part of the 3rd Air Defence Corps of the Moscow Air Defence District.
