= Diversion airport =

Airport designated for emergency landing

Diversion airports are airports capable of handling a particular ETOPS-rated aircraft during an emergency landing and whose flying distance at the point of emergency does not exceed the ETOPS diversion period for that aircraft.

Any airport designated as an en route diversion airport must have the facilities to safely support that particular aircraft, and weather conditions at the time of arrival must allow a safe landing with an engine or systems malfunctioning.

An ETOPS/LROPS flight may be conducted solely if the diversion airports are available throughout the length of the flight. Unavailability due to bad weather, for example, might require an inflight rerouting.

In the United Kingdom, "Plan 39" is a system of pre-approved slots at diversion airports, for certain airlines and aircraft types only, for use in a "mass diversion" event such as a runway closure or severe weather.
