= Kansk (air base) =

Airport in Krasnoyarsk Krai, Russia

Kansk
- Kansk, Krasnoyarsk Krai in Russia
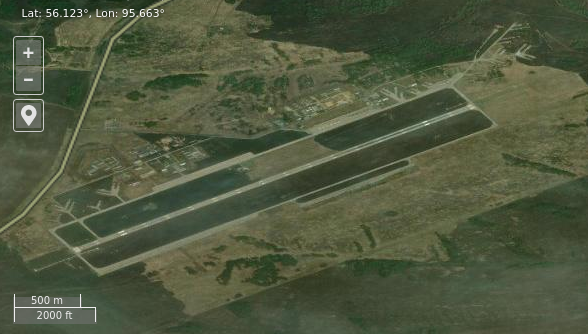
- Satellite imagery of Kansk air base

Site information
- Type: Air Base
- Owner: Ministry of Defence
- Operator: Russian Aerospace Forces

Location
- Shown within Krasnoyarsk Krai Kansk (Russia)
- Coordinates: 56°7′24″N 95°39′48″E

Site history
- Built: 1959
- In use: 1959 - present

Airfield information
- Identifiers: ICAO: XNKG
- Elevation: 316 metres (1,037 ft) AMSL
Runways
Direction	Length and surface
06/24	2,566 metres (8,419 ft) Concrete

Kansk-Dalny is an air base in Russia located 9 km south of Kansk. It is a fighter base with about 10 remote revetments.

The base is home to the 712th Guards Fighter Aviation Regiment which flies the Mikoyan MiG-31 (NATO: Foxhound) under the 21st Composite Aviation Division.

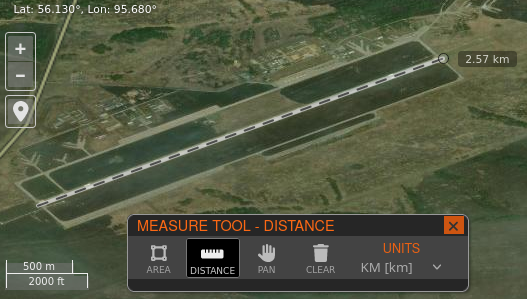
NASA's FIRMS shows runway 06/24 to be 2.57 km

As of 2024 satellite imagery shows runway 06/24 to be 2.57 km.

== Station history ==
The 712th Guards Fighter Aviation Regiment arrived at Kansk in 1959. The 712th Guards were previously based at Kansk-Tsentralny, an old 2000m runway, with no taxiways that exists between the city and airfield, closed in the 1990s.The regiment flew Mikoyan-Gurevich MiG-17 (NATO: Fresco) aircraft during the 1970s, Mikoyan-Gurevich MiG-25 (NATO: Foxbat), Sukhoi Su-15TM (NATO: Flagon) aircraft during the 1980s and Mikoyan MiG-31 (ASCC "Foxhound") aircraft during the 1990s.

In 2009 the regiment was retitled the 6979th Air Base but in 2015 returned to its previous designation. Kansk-Dalny was originally an unpaved runway until it was modernized in 1975 with the construction of a concrete runway, taxiways and revetments as a result of the conversion of the 712th Guards to the Sukhoi Su-15TM.

In December 2012, six MiG-31BM modernized fighter jets entered service with the Kansk Aviation Group. The 712th Guards Fighter Aviation Regiment is tasked with the air defense of key locations in its area of responsibility.

From the mid-1980s to 1994, the 15th Separate Aviation Rescue Detachment (OASO), equipped with the Tupolev A-3 Aerosledge, Mil Mi-8T (NATO: Hip), and Antonov An-12BP (NATO: Cub), was based at the airfield.

The 662nd Training Regiment (Military Unit Number 15435) of the Barnaul Higher Military Aviation School of Pilots was also based at the airfield until the mid-1990s, operating the Aero L-39 Albatros, the Antonov An-2 (NATO: Colt), and the Antonov An-24VSR (NATO: Coke) radio operator training aircraft.

== Accidents and incidents ==
- In April 2008, during a flight at an altitude of 16,213 m and a true speed of 2,414 km / h, the folding part of the lantern of the first cockpit, in which Lieutenant Colonel Kozitsky KN was located, broke down and depressurized both cabins of the aircraft. The crew reduced speed and altitude in extremely low temperatures (below −55 degrees Celsius), and then made a safe landing at the airfield. For the courage and high professionalism shown, the crew consisting of lieutenant colonel of Vladimir Prikhodko and Konstantin Kozitsky was presented with state awards.

== See also ==
- List of military airbases in Russia
- List of regiments of the Russian Air Force

== Links ==
- The command of the Air Force presented to the awards lieutenant colonels V. Prikhodko and K. Kozitsky for saving the aircraft after depressurization
