= Borisovsky Khotilovo air base =

Military airbase in Tver Oblast, Russia

Borisovsky Khotilovo
- Bologoye, Tver Oblast in Russia
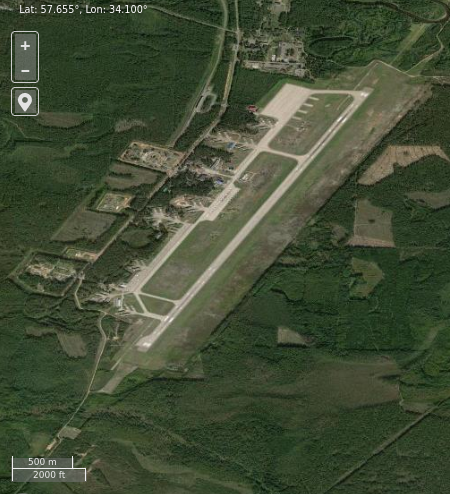
- Satellite imagery of Borisovsky Khotilovo air base

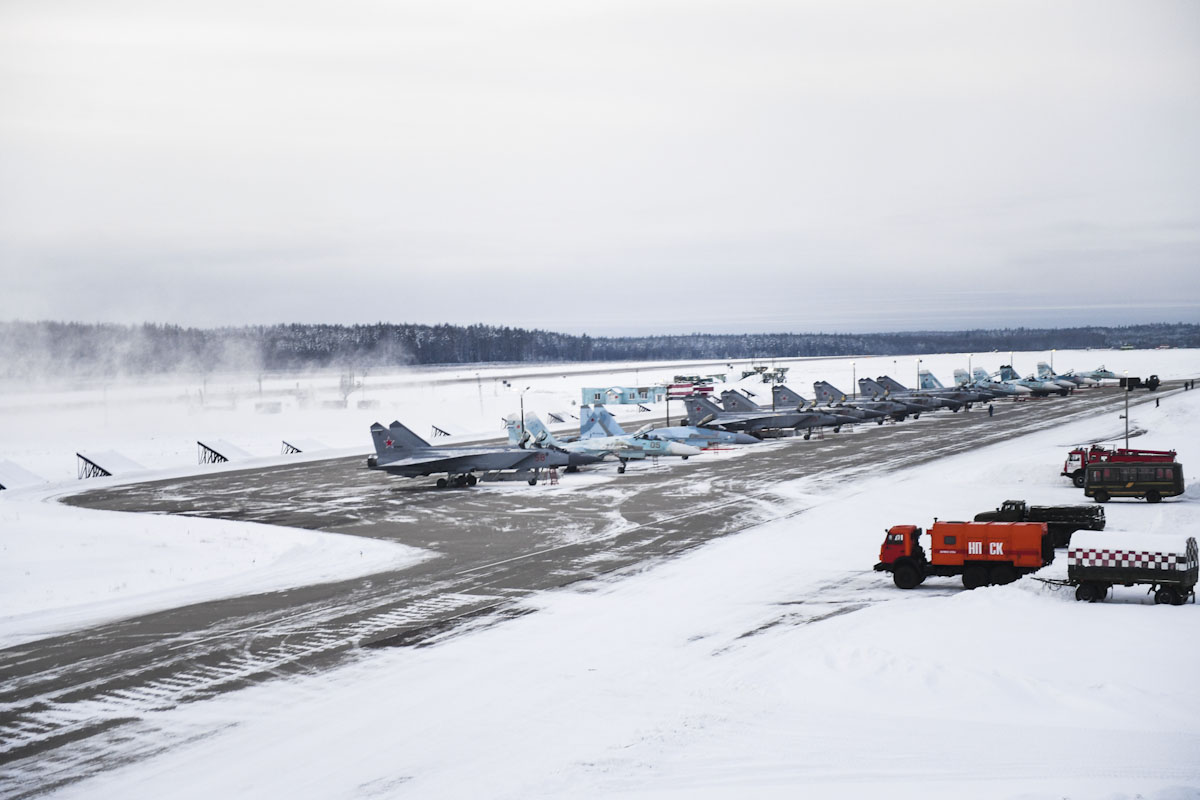
- Sukhoi Su-27 and Mikoyan MiG-31 of the 790th Fighter Aviation Regiment at Khotilovo

Site information
- Owner: Ministry of Defence
- Operator: Russian Aerospace Forces
- Controlled by: 6th Air and Air Defence Forces Army

Location
- Shown within Tver Oblast, Russia Borisovsky Khotilovo (Russia)
- Coordinates: 57°39′18″N 34°6′0″E

Site history
- In use: Unknown - present

Airfield information
- Identifiers: ICAO: XUEH
- Elevation: 180 metres (591 ft) AMSL
Runways
Direction	Length and surface
02/20	3,000 metres (9,843 ft) Concrete

Borisovsky Khotilovo (also given as Borisovskiy, Borisovsky, and Khatilovo) is an air base in Tver Oblast, Russia located 24 km south of the town of Bologoye. It is an interceptor base with three groups of fan revetments and is home to 790 IAP (790th Fighter Aviation Regiment) flying 38 Mikoyan-Gurevich MiG-25 aircraft during the Cold War and Mikoyan MiG-31s through the 1990s.

== History ==
Borisovsky's interceptor regiment initially operated the Sukhoi Su-9 (NATO:Fishpot) in the 1960s. The regiment replaced it in 1980 with the Mikoyan-Gurevich MiG-25 (NATO:Foxbat-A). This was unique to Borisovsky, as all other Su-9 bases received the Mikoyan-Gurevich MiG-23 (NATO:Flogger).

The first aircraft in the area of the village Khotilovo appeared before World War II.

In the period from March 1945 to July 1946, the control and regiments of the 257th Svirsky Fighter Aviation Division disbanded in July 1946 (Yakovlev Yak-9M and Lavochkin La-7).

In the 1950s and 1960s, propellers and first jet aircraft were based here. During their operation, many pilots and test pilots died – some pilots were buried in the cemetery in the village of Hotilovo. Until recently, it was still possible to see the graves with propellers. The town of the airfield was located along the highway. The take-off field and taxiways were created from standard metal ladders, which can still be seen in the village – they are used both as tracks and as hedges. When visiting Fidel Castro rocket division in the city Bologoe-4, he flew with the government delegation to the Hotilovo airfield . Maintenance of the airfield went through the nearest railway station at Kuzhenkino. It was equipped with a warehouse, a loading area and a place for unloading fuel. The planes arrived and departed by rail unassembled, in wooden gray containers – the fuselage and the plane separately. Later, in the 70s, the town and the airfield itself were moved a few kilometers to the side, across the Shlin river, where it occupies its present position.

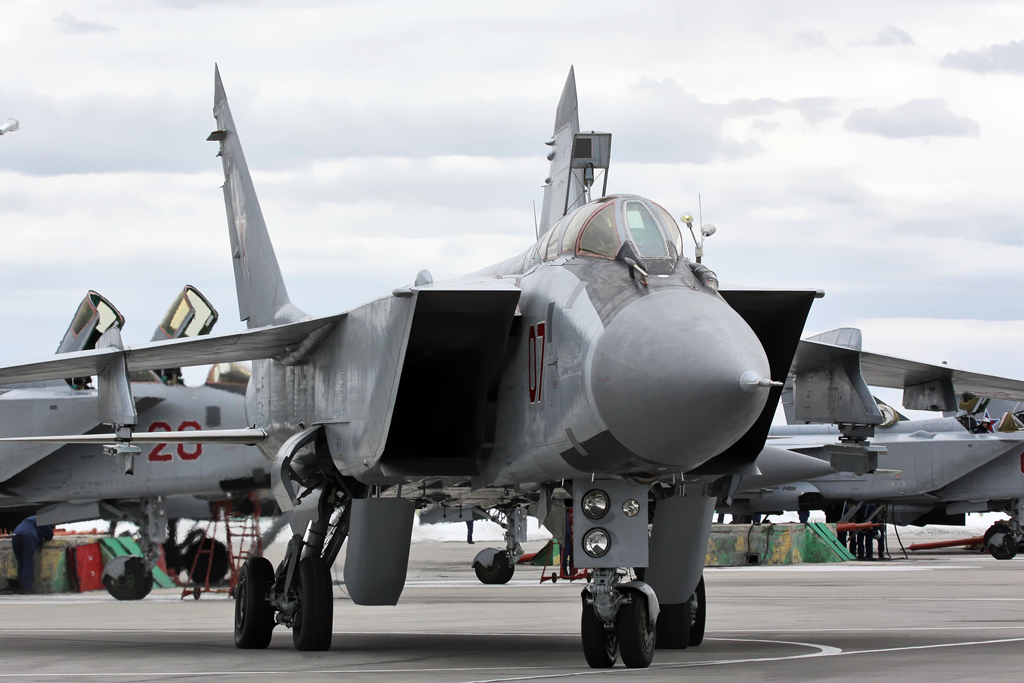
MiG-31 from 790 IAP

From April 2006 a cardinal reconstruction was made: the length was increased Runway from 2500 to 3000 meters and its width, the runway, apron covers and taxiways were completely replaced by concrete monolith; new buildings of the control tower (KDP), a launch command center (UPC) and several other buildings for various purposes were built. After reconstruction, the airfield is capable of receiving any type of Russian military aircraft, including the strategic bomber Tupolev Tu-160.

On 1 June 2005 a Mikoyan MiG-31 based here crash-landed here; the crew was only injured.

By order of the Commander of the Special Forces Command, from 24 September 2007 the aerodrome was put into operation.

The air base personnel took an active part in the Russian-Belarusian exercises "Zapad 2009 exercise", where they worked on the interception of air targets. In addition, combat shooting is conducted every year at the Ashuluk and Ladoga firing ranges.

As of February 2014, the base was closed for runway 02/20 reconstruction.

== Composition of the air base ==
Currently located at the airbase:

- The 790th Fighter aviation regiment which use the Mikoyan MiG-31 (NATO: Foxhound).
- 3rd Squadron Sukhoi Su-35S (NATO: Flanker-E).

Since 2007 the site is a joint-based airfield – in addition to military aviation, there is also a civilian base a Federal State Budgetary Institution "Russia" special flight squadron. The airfield is used by the President of the Russian Federation and his guests when traveling to the residence "Dinner" in Valdai.

=== 790 Fighter Regiment ===
69th "A" Fighter Aviation Regiment – the 790th Fighter Regiment of the Kutuzov Aviation Regiment. Formed in October–November 1941 in Kirovabad on the basis of the 69th IAP and received the name of the 69th "A" fighter regiment. Later, on 8 March 1942, he received a new number: the 790th ip. In service was a fighter LaGG-3. On 15 May 1942 he began combat work as part of the Air Force of the 46th Army on the Transcaucasian Front.

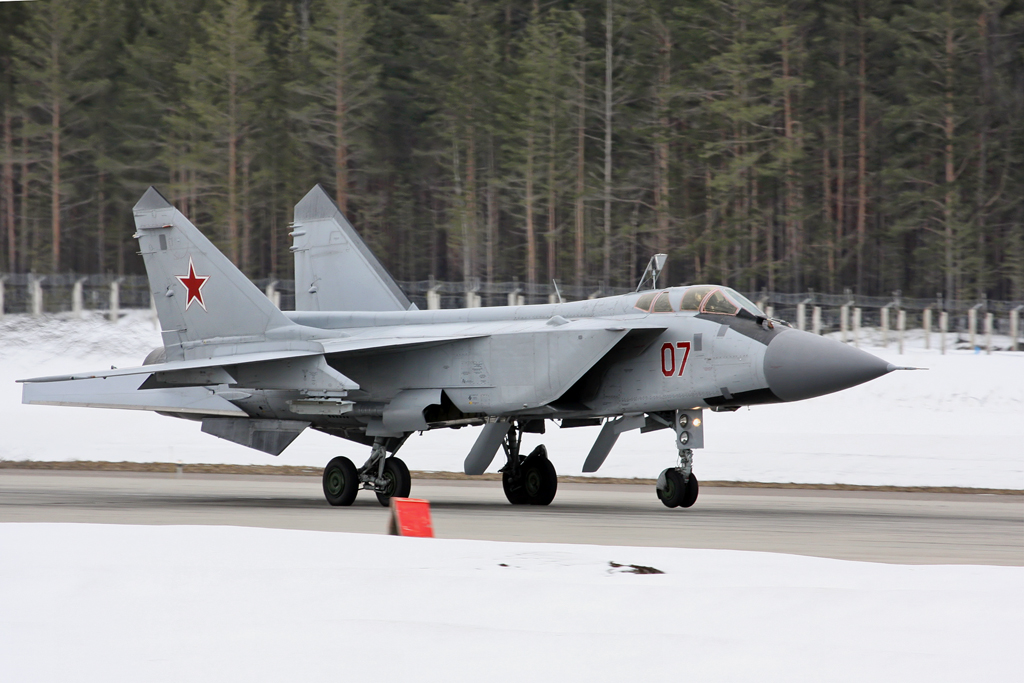
MiG-31 from 790 iap

In August 1942 joined the 219th Bomber Aviation Division, which operated in the Transcaucasian, and since January 1943 in the North Caucasus Front. From April 1943 acted as part of the 229th Fighter Division. In May 1944 he was withdrawn to the rear for re-formation, where he became part of the 129th Iad. Re-armed with fighter jets La-5. From 13 October 1944 until the end of the war, he acted as part of the 129th Jade on the 3rd Belorussian Front. During the war years, the regiment pilots won 182 aerial victories.

In 1980–1993, the regiment flew airplanes MiG-25. Since 1994, the air regiment gradually re-armed with interceptor fighters MiG-31. During the reconstruction of the Khotilovo airbase in 2006–2008, the air regiment was temporarily relocated to the air base in Dorokhovo. With the transition to the new look of the Armed Forces of the Russian Federation, the regiment became an airbase as part of the Air Force Operational-Strategic Command of the Air Force, that is, the re-formed Special Purpose Command. The air regiment received a squadron of Su-27 from the Bezhetsk Fighter Regiment. And in Bezhetsk, the commandant's office remained, structurally incorporated into the Hotilovo airbase.
