= Dorokhovo =

Dorokhovo (Russian: Дорохово) is the name of several rural localities in Russia:

- Dorokhovo, Arkhangelsk Oblast, a village in Khavrogorsky Selsoviet of Kholmogorsky District of Arkhangelsk Oblast
- Dorokhovo, Bryansk Oblast, a village in Morachovsky Selsoviet of Zhiryatinsky District of Bryansk Oblast
- Dorokhovo, Kaluga Oblast, a village in Meshchovsky District of Kaluga Oblast
- Dorokhovo, Krasnoyarsk Krai, a selo in Dorokhovsky Selsoviet of Nazarovsky District of Krasnoyarsk Krai
- Dorokhovo, Orekhovo-Zuyevsky District, Moscow Oblast, a village in Dorokhovskoye Rural Settlement of Orekhovo-Zuyevsky District of Moscow Oblast
- Dorokhovo, Ruzsky District, Moscow Oblast, a settlement in Dorokhovskoye Rural Settlement of Ruzsky District of Moscow Oblast
- Dorokhovo, Novgorod Oblast, a village in Kirovskoye Settlement of Moshenskoy District of Novgorod Oblast
- Dorokhovo, Novorzhevsky District, Pskov Oblast, a village in Novorzhevsky District, Pskov Oblast
- Dorokhovo, Pushkinogorsky District, Pskov Oblast, a village in Pushkinogorsky District, Pskov Oblast
- Dorokhovo, Smolensk Oblast, a village in Otnosovskoye Rural Settlement of Vyazemsky District of Smolensk Oblast
- Dorokhovo, Bezhetsky District, Tver Oblast, a settlement in Bezhetsky District, Tver Oblast
- Dorokhovo, Kalyazinsky District, Tver Oblast, a village in Kalyazinsky District, Tver Oblast
- Dorokhovo, Staritsky District, Tver Oblast, a village in Staritsky District, Tver Oblast
- Dorokhovo, Zapadnodvinsky District, Tver Oblast, a village in Zapadnodvinsky District, Tver Oblast
