= Vyazma Airport =

Vyazma
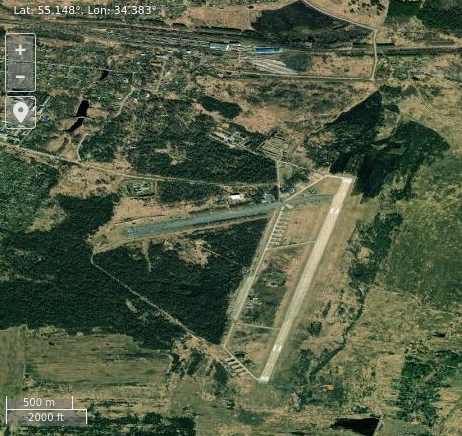
- Satellite imagery of Vyazma Airport

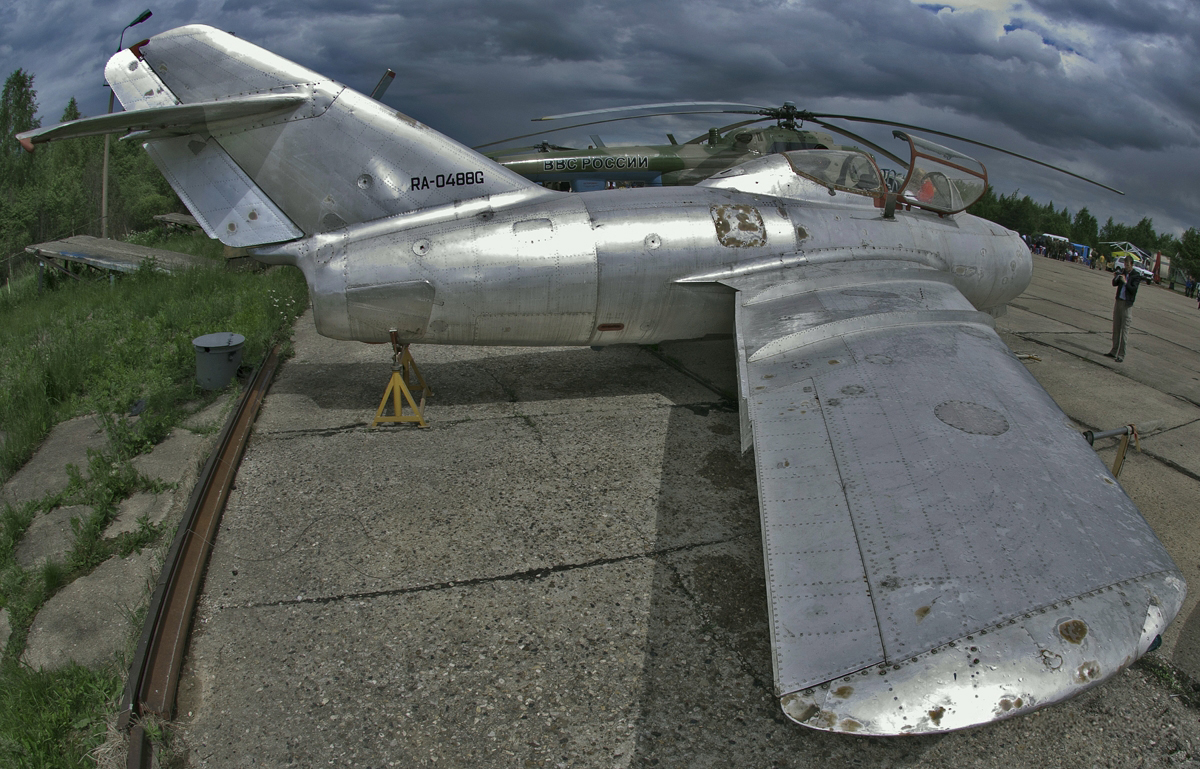
- IATA: none; ICAO: none

Summary
- Airport type: Joint
- Operator: unknown
- Location: Vyazma
- Elevation AMSL: 794 ft / 242 m
- Coordinates: 55°8′54″N 34°23′0″E

Map
- Location in Smolensk Oblast Vyazma (Russia)

Runways
Direction	Length		Surface
Direction	ft	m	Surface
01/19	6,562	2,000	Concrete

Vyazma Airport (also Vyaz'ma) is an airport in Russia located 9 km southeast of Vyazma.

It is currently home to the 440th Independent Helicopter Regiment.

== History ==
In 1960 it was a Soviet Air Defence Forces base, with the 304th Fighter Aviation Regiment PVO flying Mikoyan-Gurevich MiG-17s; the regiment's fate is unknown following the parent 297th Fighter Aviation Division PVO's deactivation in 1960.

An AirForces Monthly (AFM) article in January 1997, written following a visit to the airfield, said that it had housed a DOSAAF training regiment up until about 1980, flying some 80 MiG-17s and two Mikoyan-Gurevich MiG-15UTIs. From 1980 the unit converted to the Aero L-29 Delfín and then the L-39C Albatros, with around 70 aircraft on strength. When AFM visited, all the now-ROSTO aircraft, roughly 40 L-29s and 30 L-39Cs, were parked in a small area of the airfield, as there were no hangars. The facility at the time was offering sightseeing and proficiency flights to the paying general public in these aircraft in order to make ends meet.

Also at the airfield during the AFM visit were many Mil Mi-24D/V/Ks and Mil Mi-8TV/MT/MTVs of 440 OVP (Otdel'nyy Vertoletnyy Polk, Separate Helicopter Regiment), 3rd Shock Army, relocated from Stendal in Germany. A small group of Mi-8PPAs and Mi-8SMVs, AFM said, were probably formerly flown by the 292 OVP at Cochstedt in Germany. 440 OVP crewmembers and families, the magazine said, had been housed in newly built homes paid for by the German government.

== See also ==
- List of airports in Russia
- List of military airbases in Russia
