= Oreshkovo Airfield =

Airport in Vorotynsk, Russia

Oreshkovo Орешково
- IATA: none; ICAO: UUFO

Summary
- Airport type: Private
- Owner: Kaluga Oblast
- Operator: Albatross Aero
- Location: Vorotynsk
- Elevation AMSL: 545 ft (166 m)
- Coordinates: 54°28′6″N 036°4′24″E
- Interactive map of Oreshkovo

Runways
Direction	Length		Surface
Direction	ft	m	Surface
	6,562	2,000	Concrete

Oreshkovo Airfield (ICAO: UUFO) is a general aviation airport in Vorotynsk, Kaluga Oblast, Russia. It is privately operated by the flying club "Albatross Aero", which operates general aviation flights as well as hosts the Oreshkovo Airpark aviation museum.

The airfield was built in the first months of the Great Patriotic War, and later became a Soviet Air Defence Forces base from 1952 to 1960, before serving as a base for DOSAAF. From 1992, the base hosted the 336th Independent Helicopter Regiment, later redesignated the 45th Independent Helicopter Regiment, until it was relocated in 2011.

In 2011, the airfield was transferred from the Russian Air Force to municipal ownership. Since 2015 it has been privately operated by "Albatross Aero".

== History ==
During the Cold War it was a Soviet Air Defence Forces base. The 176th Guards Fighter Aviation Regiment (78th Guards Fighter Aviation Corps PVO, Moscow Air Defence District) was based there from February 1952 to March 1960.

In July 1992, the 336th Independent Helicopter Regiment returned from Germany to the airfield and was placed under the Moscow Military District. The regiment then came under 1st Guards Tank Army from 31 December 1992.

On 1 October 1997, it was retitled the 45th Independent Helicopter Regiment.

The military airfield was closed in 2013 after the last unit stationed there, the 45th Independent Helicopter Regiment, was transferred to Vyazma in 2010.

As of 2023, it no longer has a military identification assigned, but is known by the local civilian code УУФО (UUFO).

The airfield is home to Mansur, a bear raised from an abandoned cub by pilots with the help of crowdfunding, who lives in a reserve on the airfield. The name Mansur means 'bear' in the local Altaic language.

== Oreshkovo Airpark ==
=== Aircraft on display ===
==== Albatros Aero ====
- Aero L-29 Delfin
- Aero L-39 Albatros - Russ display team
- Mikoyan-Gurevich MiG-17
- Mikoyan-Gurevich MiG-21MT - Product 96B
- Mikoyan-Gurevich MiG-21U - Two seater training aircraft, Product 66
- Mikoyan-Gurevich MiG-23S - (23-21), Product 22
- Mikoyan-Gurevich MiG-23UB
- Mikoyan-Gurevich MiG-25PU - Two-seat conversion trainer for MiG-25P interceptors
- Mikoyan-Gurevich MiG-25R - Product 84
- Mikoyan MiG-27ML - Export variant developed for the Indian Air Force
- Mikoyan MiG-29SMT
- Mil Mi-8T
- Sukhoi Su-17M
- Sukhoi Su-24M - T6M, Product 44
- Sukhoi Su-24MR - T6R, Product 48
- Sukhoi Su-27M - Russian Knights.
- Sukhoi T10K-9 - Su-27K
- Sukhoi T10-15 - P-42

==== Technical Museum of Vadim Zadorozhny ====
- Douglas C-47A Skytrain
- Mikoyan-Gurevich MiG-3 - Restored from serial number 3872 found in Tver in 2005.
- North American SNJ-4
- PZL Lim-2 - Polish licensed built Mikoyan-Gurevich MiG-15
- Polikarpov I-15bis - Restored from serial number 4439 found in Karelia in 1997.
- Polikarpov I-15bis DIT - Replica
- Polikarpov I-153
- Polikarpov Po-2A/U-2

==== Privately owned ====
- Aero L-29 Delfin - "Dolphin"
- Aero L-29 Delfin
- Aero L -39 Albatros
- Aero L-39 Albatros - cockpit section
- Beechcraft Bonanza
- Ilyushin Il-14T - "Penguin"
- Kamov Ka-26
- Mikoyan-Gurevich MiG-15Rbis
- Mikoyan-Gurevich MiG-15UTI
- Mikoyan-Gurevich MiG-23P - cockpit section
- Mikoyan MiG-29B - Swifts
- Mil Mi-8T
- Mil Mi-24K - cockpit section
- Nieuport 17 - Replica of serial number No. 1910 flown by flying ace Alexander Kazakov
- T-60 tank from the Antonov A-40
- Tupolev Tu-141
- Yakovlev UT-2

== Sources ==
- RussianAirFields.com
