= Andreapol air base =

Former airport in Tver Oblast, Russia

Andreapol
- Andreapol, Tver Oblast in Russia
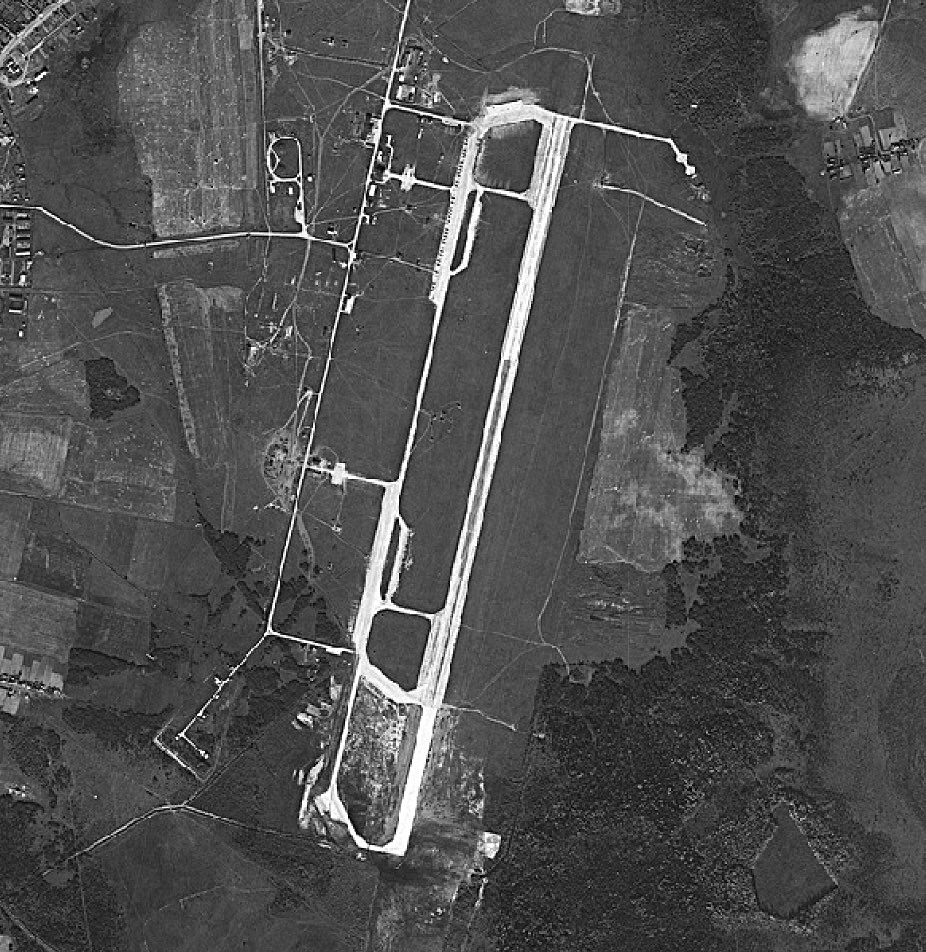
- Satellite imagery of Andreapol Air Base captured by KH-7 on 3 October, 1965.

Site information
- Type: Air Base
- Owner: Ministry of Defence
- Operator: Russian Air Force

Location
- Shown within Tver Oblast Andreapol (Russia)
- Coordinates: 56°38′36″N 32°18′48″E

Site history
- In use: Unknown - 2019

Airfield information
- Identifiers: ICAO: UUEA
- Elevation: 229 metres (751 ft) AMSL
Runways
| Direction | Length and surface |
|---|---|
| 06/24 | 2,500 metres (8,202 ft) Concrete |

Andreapol is a former Soviet and Russian Air Force air base in Tver Oblast, Russia located 3 km east of Andreapol. It was built as an interceptor aircraft base. It was home to the 28th Guards Fighter Aviation Regiment (28 Gv IAP), which flew MiG-23P aircraft in the early 1990s and soon acquired MiG-29 aircraft.

In 1994, part of the personnel and aircraft from the 773rd Guards Fighter Regiment were transferred to Andreapol to join the 28th Guards Fighter Aviation Regiment. In 2003, during runway repairs at Kubinka the aerobatic teams Russian Knights and Swifts were relocated to Andreapol.

A MiG-29 crashed on May 12, 2005 near the air base.

The 28th Regiment disbanded probably in 2009.

As of 2019, the Air Base is reported as being closed, or at least "inactive".

== See also ==
- List of military airbases in Russia
