= Protasovo (air base) =

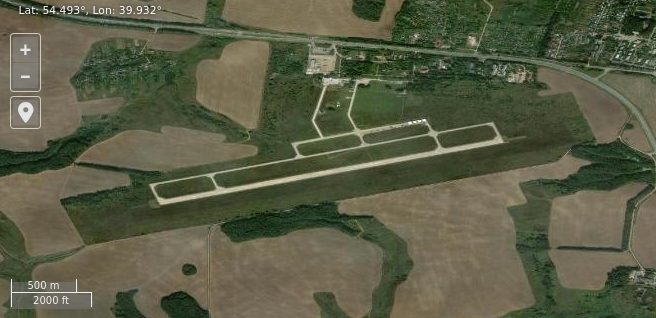
- Satellite imagery of former Protasovo air base
- IATA: none; ICAO: none

Summary
- Operator: Russian Air Force
- Serves: Ryazan
- Elevation AMSL: 469 ft (143 m)
- Coordinates: 54°29′36″N 39°55′54″E
- Interactive map of Protasovo

Runways
Direction	Length		Surface
Direction	ft	m	Surface
	6,562	2,000	Concrete

Protasovo (Russian: Протасово), in western media also given as Ryazan Alexandrovo or Aleksandrovo, was an air base in Ryazan Oblast, Russia located 19 kilometers (12 mi) southeast of Ryazan.

Before 1992 it was home to the Ryazan Training Centre (Russian: Рязанский УАЦ, romanized: Ryazanskiy UATs), a DOSAAF training unit, flying the L-29. After the 1992 military reforms, the unit was disbanded, and the airbase became home to the 865th Helicopter Reserve Base (Russian: 865-я брв / 865-я база резерва вертолётов, romanized: 865-ya baza rezerva vertolyotov), a storage and dismantling unit, handling Mi-8 and Mi-24 helicopters of the Russian Air Force. However, Google Earth high-resolution images from 2004 and 2005 show the airfield was vacated with no aircraft present, probably meaning all helicopters had been scrapped by then.

As of 2012, the Ryazan Aeroclub was reported to be based on the airfield.

== See also ==
- List of military airbases in Russia

== Sources ==
- "Avia" Рязань и авиация [Ryazan and aviation] (in Russian).
- - accessed January 2007
