= Aerial warfare in the Russo-Ukrainian war =

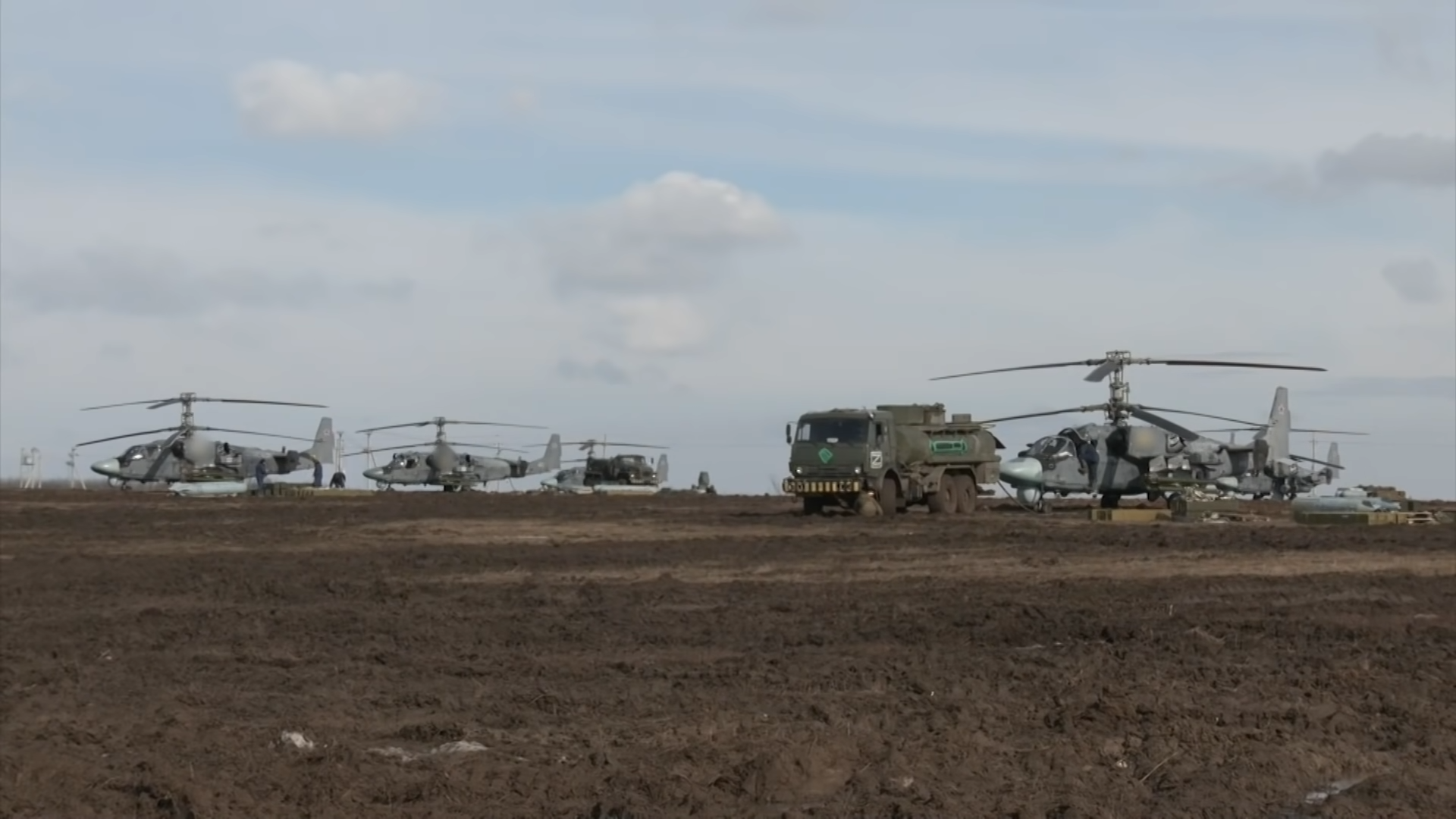
Russian Aerospace Forces helicopters in a field during the invasion, March 2022

During the Russo-Ukrainian war, aerial warfare took place as early as the dawn of 24 February 2022, with Russian infantry and armored divisions entering into Eastern Ukraine with air support. Dozens of missile attacks were reported across Ukraine. The main infantry and tank attacks were launched in four spearhead incursions, creating a northern front launched towards Kyiv, a southern front originating in Crimea, a south-eastern front launched at the cities of Luhansk and Donbas, and an eastern front. Dozens of missile strikes across Ukraine also reached as far west as Lviv. Drones have also been a critical part of the invasion, particularly in regards to combined arms warfare. Drones have additionally been employed by Russia in striking Ukrainian critical infrastructure, and have been used by Ukraine to strike military infrastructure in Russian territory.

== Air forces ==
=== Ukrainian Air Force ===
After the beginning of the Russo-Ukrainian War on Donbas in 2014, the development of air defense capabilities was a goal of the Ukrainian government. This consisted of ensuring that the radio engineering troops, responsible for providing warning from air attacks, could detect targets in a 300–400 kilometres (190–250 mi) range. In addition, Ukraine tried to modernize and increase the lifespans of its man-portable air-defense systems (MANPADS), which played a significant role in Ukraine's short range air defense capabilities.

The Ukrainian Air Force, led by Lieutenant General Mykola Oleshchuk, is the aerial branch of the Ukrainian Armed Forces. Prior to the invasion the Ukrainian Air Force had around 50 MiG-29 fighters in the 40th, 204th and 114th Tactical Aviation Brigade, 32 Su-27 fighters from the 831st and 39th Tactical Aviation Brigade as well as a few of Su-24 and Su-25 aircraft. However, the Ukrainian Air Force was still at a technical disadvantage to the Russian Air Force at the beginning of the invasion. The Army Aviation was reported to field 15 Mi-2, 60 Mi-8 cargo helicopters and 60 Mi-24 attack helicopters, some of these were non-operational at the time.

In April 2022, an unspecified country handed spare parts to help Ukraine restore 20 jet aircraft to operational usage, a United States defence official claimed. In June 2022, 20 Mi-17 cargo helicopters were supplied by the United States to the Ukrainian Army.

In May 2023, the United States indicated support for training Ukrainian pilots on the F-16 fighters and for allies to transfer the aircraft to Ukraine. After this, multiple countries, including the Netherlands, Denmark and Norway, pledged F-16s to Ukraine. On 6 June 2024, according to Le Figaro, French president Emmanuel Macron announced the future transfer of an unspecified number of Mirage 2000-5 fighter jets to Ukraine.

=== Russian Aerospace Forces ===
The Russian Aerospace Forces, which consists of the Russian Air Force, the Air and Missile Defense Forces, and the Russian Space Forces, is currently led by Viktor Afzalov. The Russian Aerospace Forces, formed in August 2015, were previously headed by Sergey Surovikin, who was sacked from his position in August 2023 in the aftermath of the Wagner Group Rebellion. As of 2021, Russia had 4,173 active aircraft, comprising 8% of the world share, according to data from Flight Global. Close to 1,200 fixed wing aircraft are reported to be employed in the war.

== Timeline ==
=== Initial invasion (24 February – 7 April 2022) ===
According to Mikhail Khodaryonok, Russians expecting a quick Russian victory in Ukraine falsely believed that: Russia could overwhelm Ukrainian defense with a powerful "first strike", which overlooked Russia's limited number of Kalibr cruise missiles, Kinzhal hypersonic missiles, Iskander missiles, and Kh-101 air-launched cruise missiles; and that Russia achieving air dominance would be the decisive factor in obtaining a fast victory, which disregarded previous conflicts (such as the Soviet–Afghan War and the Chechen Wars) in which achieving air dominance did not obtain a fast victory.

Russian forces were unable to achieve air dominance over Ukraine in the early days of the war, which contributed to the Russian army failing to achieve its initial strategic objectives. Justin Bronk, a senior fellow at the Royal United Services Institute, attributed the failure to establish air superiority to a lack of early warning, coordination capacity and sufficient planning time. In addition, the Russian use of small jet formations and the U.S's fast delivery of anti-aircraft FIM-92 Stingers to Ukraine were also factors in Russia not achieving air superiority. In addition, Ukraine successfully used anti-air systems against Russia, which meant that Russian aircraft could not freely operate over most of Ukrainian-controlled territory. Due to the Russians having limited numbers of air resources for bombing, as well as Russian aircraft losses, Russian forces began to rely on missiles, which were often less accurate, instead of planes and helicopters.

At the opening stages of the war, Russia aimed to pin down Ukrainian air defenses by conducting ballistic and cruise missile strikes, and strike Ukrainian military infrastructure, arms, shipments from the West, fuel facilities, and bridges. During the first 21 days of the war, Russia launched over 1,100 missiles, and 2,125 over the first 68 days. On the first day of the invasion alone, Russia launched 100 short-range ballistic missiles. Russia faced problems in this campaign due to a lack of air supremacy, as well as logistics problems (such as running low on long range, precision guided missiles). In addition, Ukraine was able to move most of their planes before Russian missile attacks on Ukrainian airfields began on 24 February.

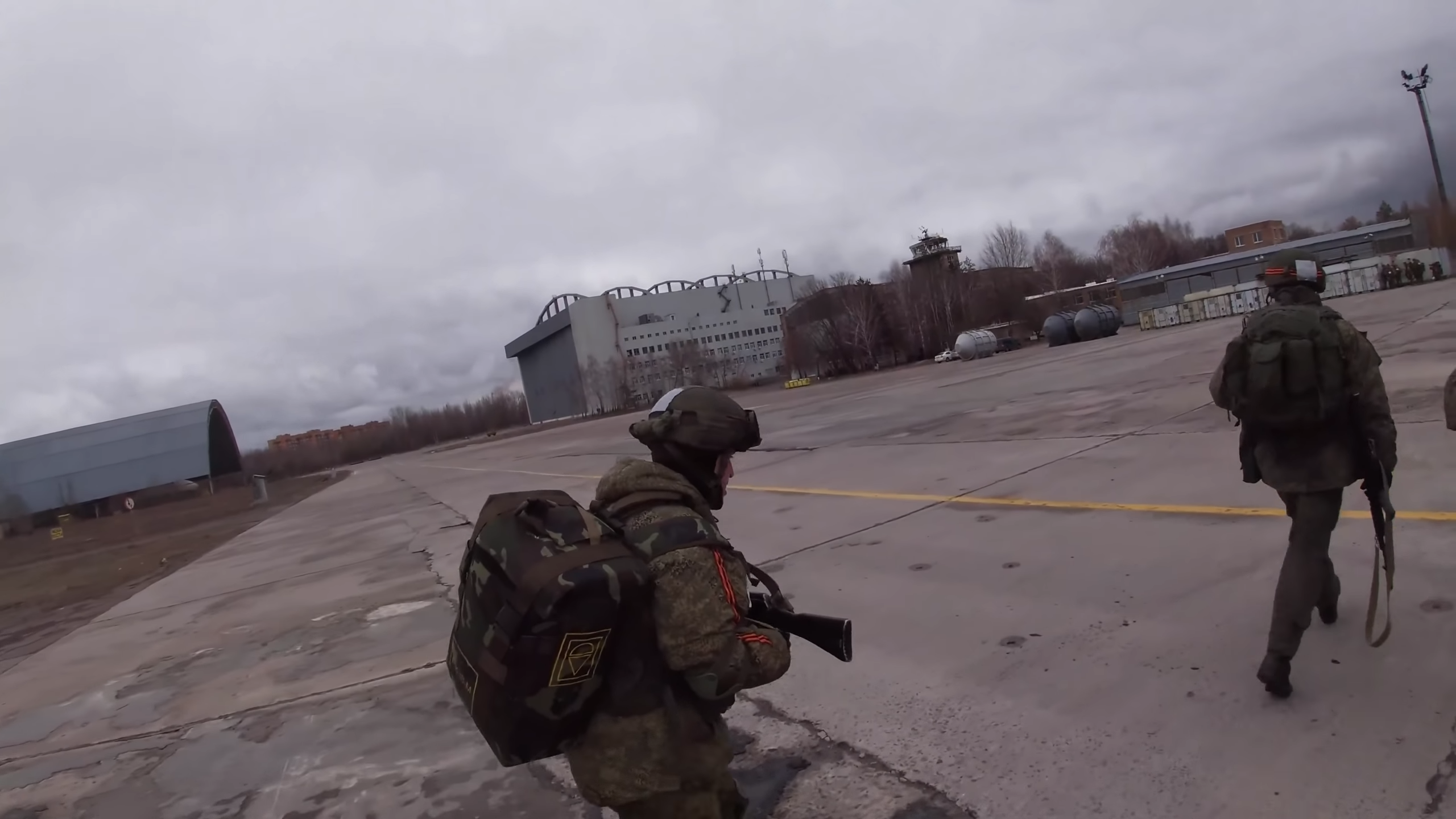
Russian airborne soldiers during the Battle of Antonov Airport

The first major battle of the invasion, the Battle of Antonov Airport, began on 24 February. The Russians aimed to use the airport to land a paratrooper force near Kyiv. The attack began with Russian Ka-52 attack helicopters and Mi-8 transport helicopters, with paratroopers on board. While Russian forces managed to take Antonov Airport, the Ukrainians contested the area for multiple more days. The Russians' failure to achieve air superiority also significantly hampered their efforts to take the airport. The resistance of Ukraine at Antonov Airport, and the failure of Russian paratroopers to take another airport in Vasylkiv a few days later, were significant reasons why the Battle of Kyiv failed. Russian forces took heavy paratrooper losses during the Battle of Kyiv. Later during the Battle of Kyiv, on 28 February, Russian forces sent a 15,000 strong convoy from Belarus into Ukraine, in order to help encirclement efforts of Kyiv. Ukraine employed Bayraktar TB2 drones to breach Russian anti-air systems included in the convoy. During the Odesa offensive in late march, Russia used cruise missiles to strike port infrastructure and the military airport in Odesa.

In the first month of the war, multiple countries provided air components to Ukraine: the U.S. provided 1,400 Stinger anti-aircraft missile systems, 5,500 Javelin anti-tank missile systems, and 16 Mi-17 helicopters; Britain gave 10,000 short-range missiles and 10,000 anti-tank missiles; France gave MILAN anti-tank guided missile systems; and Germany gave 500 Stingers.

=== Southeastern front (8 April – 28 August 2022) ===
In April, after Russia abandoned the Kyiv Offensive, Russia refocused its missile attacks from Ukraine's military air fields and air defenses to economic and logistical targets. To that end, Russia targeted Ukraine's petroleum industry and oil refineries, which likely contributed to a temporary shortage of gasoline for Ukraine in the spring and summer of 2022. In addition, Russia struck Ukraine's bridge and rail infrastructure in an effort to slow the transfer of Western supplied weapons to Ukraine. However, neither of these efforts had a lasting impact on the war.

During this period in the Battle of Donbas, fighting became increasingly dominated by the use of artillery. As this increased, the importance of target acquisition also increased. To help with target acquisition, both sides used a wide range of drones. In a study by the Royal United Services Institute covering the period of the war up to July 2022, it was assessed that around 90% of drones used by Ukraine during this time period were destroyed.

From the last week of March to the end of April, Ukraine initiated helicopter raids to rescue members of the Azov Regiment during the Siege of Mariupol. These raids consisted of sixteen Mi-8 helicopters and resulted in the loss of three helicopters.

On 14 April, Ukraine sunk the cruiser Moskva with the use of Neptune missiles and a drone. The loss of the Moskva, which was the only Black Sea Fleet ship to have the S-300 missile system, left the other Black Sea Fleet ships with insufficient anti-air capabilities. This led the other Black Sea Fleet ships to relocate to the Sevastopol harbor, where there were ground based anti-air defences.

By the summer of 2022, Russian attacks against civilians and the Ukrainian agricultural sector using long-range missiles had increased. The increase in civilian attacks happened at the same time that there were reports that Russia was running low on higher-end precision-guided missiles, such as the Kh-101, and was instead using missiles not suited for land attacks, such as anti-ship missiles like the Kh-22 and S-300 anti-air missiles. It is likely that this increase in civilian attacks came in part intentionally, and in part due to inaccurate Russian missiles and bad targeting information.

On 28 June, Oleksii Reznikov, the defence minister of Ukraine, said that Ukraine had been given fifty Turkish Bayraktar TB2 drones since the start of the invasion.

On 9 August, Ukraine struck Saky airbase in Novofedorivka, Crimea, leading to the destruction of four Su-30M jets and seven Su-24 jets.

=== 2022 Ukrainian counteroffensives (29 August – 11 November 2022) ===
After Ukraine attacked the Kerch Straight Bridge on 8 October, Russia began a campaign to degrade Ukraine's electrical infrastructure through the use of missile and drone strikes. In the first week after having started these attacks, Russia struck about 30% of the power stations in Ukraine. While this campaign led to significant damage of Ukraine's energy infrastructure, Ukraine was able to avoid a complete collapse of its electrical grid.

=== 2023–2024 winter campaigns ===
On 19 October 2023, Ukrainian forces carried out Operation Dragonfly, striking the Luhansk International Airport in the east and Berdiansk Airport in the south. During the operation, the Special Operations Forces used six MGM-140 ATACMS for the attack, which led to the heavy losses in the Russian Air Force. According to satellite imagery, these included two Mi-8s and six Ka-52s destroyed, two Mi-8s and three Ka-52s damaged beyond repair, and four Mi-8s and one Ka-52 damaged. In addition, the attack also destroyed the airport runways, numerous supply depots, and some air defense systems. The Ukrainians also claimed to have caused manpower losses, but it cannot be confirmed.

The fires created due to the burning of equipment at the Berdiansk Airport was visible from NASA's FIRMS. According to Russia, there were shrapnel of M74 Bomblets found at the scene, which likely originated from the ATACMS Block IA (M39A1) that the Ukrainians used for the attack. More shrapnel found later proved that the Ukrainians used ATACMS for the operation. which is likely the first time that it has been used in Ukraine. Prior to this incident, there had been fears from American leaders that the supply of ATACMS would lead to an "escalation of tensions", which American Ben Hodges criticized has "created sanctuary for the Russians".

During the Battle of Avdiivka, according to the ISW, Russian forces gained temporary and localized air superiority, likely for the first time during the war. During the battle, Russian forces increased their use of glide bombs.

== Missile attacks and air war ==
On 24 February, Russian forces attacked the Chuhuiv air base, which housed Bayraktar TB2 drones. The attack caused damage to fuel storage areas and infrastructure, four Bayraktar TB-2 were destroyed in the ground. The same day Russian airstrikes targeted warehouses in Odesa as well as radar and air defense systems in Lipetske. The attacks left at least 22 killed and 6 wounded among servicemen and soldiers. Ukrainian authorities also reported that Russian shelling targeted the military airport in Odesa and destroyed one aircraft. The next day, Ukrainian forces attacked the Millerovo air base destroying a Su-30. On 26 February, Russian missile attack on Ivano-Frankivsk International Airport destroyed six MiG-29s. On 27 February, Russia reportedly fired 9K720 Iskander missiles from Belarus at the civilian Zhytomyr Airport. Many Ukrainian air defense facilities were destroyed or damaged in the first days of the invasion by Russian air strikes. In the opening days of the conflict, Russia fired many cruise and ballistic missiles at the principal Ukrainian ground-based early warning radars, thereby blinding the Ukrainian Air Force to their air activity. Craters in the operating surfaces at the major Ukrainian air bases hindered Ukrainian aircraft movements, and several Ukrainian long-range S-300P surface-to-air missile batteries were destroyed.

On 1 March, Russia and the US established a deconfliction line to avoid any misunderstanding that could cause an unintentional escalation. Russia lost at least ten aircraft on 5 March. On 6 March 2022, Russian Navy launched rocket strikes against the Havryshivka Vinnytsia International Airport. According to President Volodymyr Zelenskyy, eight rockets launched by Russia destroyed the infrastructure of Vinnytsia airport located in central Ukraine. Satellite imagery showed two buildings ruined, as well as one aircraft destroyed. Ten people were killed in the strike and six injured. the same day the General Staff of the Armed Forces of Ukraine reported that 88 Russian aircraft had been destroyed since the war began. However, an anonymous senior US defense official told Reuters on 7 March that Russia still had the "vast majority" of its fighter jets and helicopters that had been amassed near Ukraine available to fly. After the first month of the invasion, Justin Bronk, a British military observer, counted the Russian aircraft losses at 15 fixed-wing aircraft and 35 helicopters, but noted that the true total was certainly higher. In contrast, according to the United States, 49 Ukrainian fighter aircraft were lost by 18 March.

On 11 March, US officials said that Russian aircraft launched up to 200 sorties a day, most not entering Ukrainian airspace, instead staying in Russian airspace. On 13 March, Russian forces conducted multiple cruise missile attacks on a military training facility in Yavoriv, Lviv Oblast, close to the Polish border. Local governor Maksym Kozytskyy reported that at least 35 people had been killed in the attacks. The poor performance of the Russian Air Force has been attributed by The Economist to Russia's inability to suppress Ukraine's medium-range surface-to-air missile (SAM) batteries and Russia's lack of precision-guided bombs. Ukrainian mid-range SAM sites force planes to fly low, making them vulnerable to Stinger and other shoulder-launched surface-to-air missiles, and lack of training and flight hours for Russian pilots renders them inexperienced for the type of close ground support missions typical of modern air forces. On 5 May, Forbes magazine reported that Russians had continued air attacks and "continue to send Su-24 and Su-25 attack planes on treetop-level bombing runs targeting Ukrainian positions."

On 14 March, Russian forces conducted multiple cruise missile attacks on a military training facility in Yavoriv, Lviv Oblast, close to the Polish border. Local governor Maksym Kozytskyy reported that at least 35 people had been killed. On 18 March, Russia expanded the attack to Lviv, with Ukrainian military officials saying initial information suggested that the missiles which hit Lviv were likely air-launched cruise missiles originating from warplanes flying over the Black Sea. On 16 May, US defense officials say that in the previous 24 hours Russians fired long-range missiles targeting military training facility near Lviv. On 18 March a Russian missile attack targeted the Lviv State Aircraft Plant designed for MiG-29 repairs, which also contained foreign aircraft, left an unknown number of aircraft destroyed and damaged.

By June 2022, Russia had not achieved air superiority, having lost around 165 of its combat aircraft over Ukraine which amounted to approximately 10% of its frontline combat strength. Western commentators noted the qualitative and quantitative advantages the Russian Air Force had over its Ukrainian counterpart, but attributed the poor performance of Russian aviation to the extensive ground-based anti-aircraft capabilities of the Ukrainians.

An attack on Dnipro proper was carried out by Russian armed forces on 15 July 2022. As a result, 4 people died and 16 were injured. The main target was the largest space plant of Ukraine located within the city. The city was struck by Kh-101 missiles launched from Tu-95 aircraft in the northern part of the Caspian Sea. According to preliminary data, eight missiles were launched, of which four were shot down by the Ukrainian Air Defence Forces. Each missile costs 13 million dollars (8 missiles cost Russia more than 100 million dollars).

Part of the rockets hit the "Pivdenmash" enterprise. As a result of the impact, the city's water supply was damaged, and part of the city's residents were left without water supply. More than ten cars were damaged, doors and windows were destroyed in residential buildings. Four people were killed. One of the victims was a city bus driver. On the first day, 15 wounded were reported, and the next day their number increased to 16.

In August the USAF was able to integrate AGM-88 HARM missiles into the Ukrainian Su-27s and MiG-29s. This effort has taken "some months" to achieve. This does not give the Ukrainian air force the same "capabilities that it would on an F-16." However, US Air Force General James B. Hecker said: "Even though you don't get a kinetic kill ... you can get local air superiority for a period of time where you can do what you need to do."

On 19 September, US Air Force General James B. Hecker said that 55 Russian military aircraft had been shot down by Ukrainian air defenses since the start of the invasion. He credited this success to the Ukrainian use of SA-11 and SA-10 air defense systems. As the US does not have these systems, getting new missiles from European allies is a "big ask" from Kyiv. Russian airplanes increased their operations in response to the 2022 Ukrainian Kharkiv Oblast counteroffensive. The tally of downed aircraft increased to 55 when the UK MoD stated that it believed that some four Russian jets had been downed by Ukraine over the previous 10 days. These losses were due to changing front lines (Russia's loss of controlled territory) and other factors. Also, Russian aviation resources were under pressure to provide closer support to ground forces. As of 19 September, the Ukrainian Air Force was at "about 80%" of its pre-invasion strength after seven months of combat.

On 28 February 2023, the Ukrainian military attacked the port of Tuapse with two uncrewed aerial vehicles (UAVs) causing a large fire at the Rosneft oil terminal. It was reported by Naval News that the reach of Ukrainian forces across the Black Sea was growing with this long-range air attack over 430 km (270 mi) away from Ukrainian-controlled territory.

=== Violations of non-combatant airspaces ===
During the invasion, there have been several airspace violations of noncombatant countries, such as in Poland, Moldova, and Romania. On the starting day of the invasion, a Ukrainian Su-27 entered Romanian airspace after losing communications with its home base. The fighter was escorted to a Romanian air base and later returned to Ukraine. On 10 March 2022, a Tu-141 unmanned drone crashed in Zagreb, the capital of Croatia, after flying through Hungarian and Romanian airspace. On 15 November 2022, a stray Ukrainian air defense missile landed in Przewodów, Poland, killing two people. On 9 September 2025, at least 21 drones entered Polish airspace during an attack conducted on Ukraine. Up to four drones were shot down by NATO forces. On 25 December 2025, the Turkish Air Force further shot down an out-of-control Russian drone over the Black Sea.

On 25 April 2026, a Russian drone crashed into an apartment building in Galați, Romania, injuring two people. Other incidents took place in the same year and between 24 and 26 July, Romanian Air Force F-16s shot down three Russian drones over national territory, one confirmed as a Geran-2 (Shahed 136) one-way attack drone. On 7 May, a jammed Ukrainian drone was shot down by a Romanian F-16 on the Baltic Air Policing mission in Latvia. Another Ukrainian drone was shot down by a French Air Force Dassault Rafale over Estonia a month later, on 8 June. On 30 July 2026, a Russian Kh-101 missile violated Polish Airspace and impacted in a field near Targowisko, Lublin Voivodeship. It caused sirens to sound in Lublin.

=== Russian strikes against Ukrainian infrastructure ===
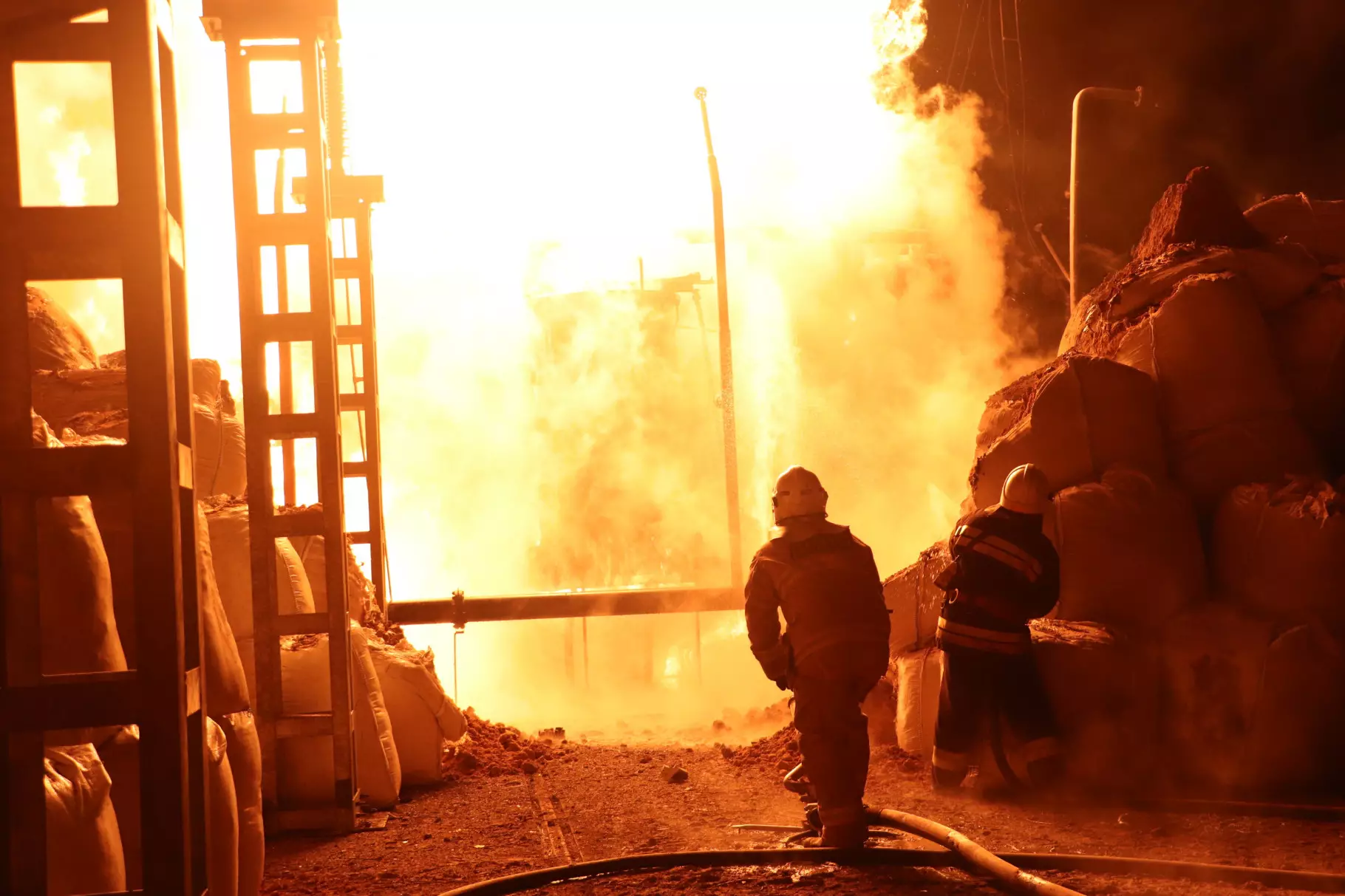
Fire after strike on an infrastructure facility in Kyiv Oblast

Russia launched about 85 to 100 missiles at a number of Ukrainian cities. The recent strategic bombing campaign has caused severe shortages of electricity and water in multiple cities. According to Ukraine's Operational Command South, Ukrainian rocket and artillery units attacked Russian positions on the left bank of the Dnipro River and in the area of the Kinburn Spit.

According to the Ukrainian Air Force, 77 of 96 Russian missiles were shot down. A Pentagon official claims the Russian plan is to exhaust the Ukrainian air defenses. At one stage some 50 missiles were in combat "within minutes" near the Polish border. Ukrainian officials report that electricity has already been restored to "nearly 100%" of Ukraine. President Zelenskyy said that about half of the Ukrainian electricity infrastructure has been hit and some 10 million people are still without power.

=== Ukrainian Storm Shadow Attacks ===
Ukraine was first reportedly supplied with U.K. made Storm Shadow missiles on 11 May 2023. Since that time that have been used in a number of attacks by the Ukrainian Air Force on strategic targets as a part of the war effort. Key targets have been ammunition depots and transit hubs, as well as bridges, notably the Chonhar bridge which has been attacked by Storm Shadow missiles on two confirmed occasions, 22 June 2023 and 6 August 2023. The aircraft commonly cited as being used to carry and fire Storm Shadow missiles is the Ukrainian Su-24M.

=== Air defense systems ===
Initial Ukrainian sources claimed that, on 25 February 2022, the Su-27 of Ukrainian Colonel Oleksandr Oksanchenko was shot down by an S-400 over Kyiv.

On 14 April 2022, the Russian Defence Ministry claimed that a Ukrainian Mi-8 was shot down by a S-400 near Horodnia, Chernihiv Oblast on its way to an air base following an attack on Russian territory near Klimovo, Bryansk Oblast.

In August 2022, Ukraine claimed that a 92N6E radar used in the S-400 SAM system was destroyed in Kherson region.

On 15 October 2022, a S-400 missile crashed or was shot down in the Grayvoronsky District of Belgorod Oblast, Russia.

On 23 August 2023, GRU released a video of two alleged elements of an S-400 battery being destroyed in Olenivka, Crimea, 120 km (75 mi) south of Kherson, by a barrage of Ukrainian missiles. Ukrainian forces, according to Ukrainian media, used a R-360 Neptune and a drone to destroy the missile's radar.

On 14 September 2023, Ukraine claimed to have destroyed a Russian S-400's radar near Yevpatoria, Crimea. On 4 October 2023, Ukrainian kamikaze drone destroyed one radar and a missile launcher of S-400 system in Belgorod region.

=== Drones ===
Use of Russian drones (unmanned aerial vehicles) increased about tenfold from early 2024 through summer 2025.

During the Russian invasion of Ukraine, both Russia and Ukraine have heavily used drones in areas such as intelligence, surveillance, target acquisition, reconnaissance, combined arms, air strikes, and electronic warfare.

During the winter and fall of 2022–2023, Russia engaged in a campaign of striking Ukrainian infrastructure, which included a widespread use of drones, resulting in significant damage to Ukraine's electrical grid. This campaign was initiated in large part in an attempt to demoralize the Ukrainian population, an initiative that has been deemed to have failed. Additionally, Russia has struck Ukrainian port and grain infrastructure with missiles and drones since its withdrawal from the Black Sea Grain Initiative in July 2023, causing an estimated loss of 280,000 metric tons of grain.

According to US officials, Iran has supplied Russia with Shahed-136 drones and has assisted Russia in building a drone production facility in Yelabuga, leading the US to impose sanctions on Iranian officials involved in the production of drones. Shahed-136 drones, which are hard for air defenses to intercept due to a flight path at low altitudes, have mostly been used by Russia to strike targets deep inside Ukrainian territory.

Ukraine has used drones in strikes against Russian military infrastructure, such as in the ongoing strikes against Crimea, and has been accused by Russia of being responsible for the Kremlin drone attack and the 30 May 2023 Moscow drone strikes, but has denied responsibility in both cases.

In October 2023, The Economist reported that electronic warfare was in widespread use on frontlines to impair small battlefield UAV activity, with Russia installing video feedback and control jammers on high-value equipment like tanks and artillery. 90% of Ukrainian FVP drones would crash by late 2023 due to Russian EW.

In January 2024, Ukrainian drone operators told Reuters and the BBC that many small first-person view (FPV) drones were cheaply assembled by volunteers at home encouraged by the government, using different controllers and settings, with a lack of quality and reliability that hindered in their use. The most common problem being video or control link failure. Each new drone needed testing before combat use. Ukrainian FPV drone pilots receive 14 hours of training to qualify.

During 2024, in response to improving Ukrainian electronic warfare capabilities particularly in the Kursk area, Russia deployed fiber-optic cable connected drones impervious to electronic warfare radio emissions which proved to be highly effective. Russia planned to produce 2 million Veterok 7 Pro FPV drones plus 30,000 long‑range/decoy drones in 2025. Russian officials later claimed they had already tripled their planned 2025 production volume by mid‑year. But western intelligence assessments have not corroborated the claimed increase.

In 2025, the goal of Ukraine's Drone Procurement Agency (DPA) was to manufacture 4.5 million drones, an average of 375,000 drones per month. But in 2025, the AFU only received 3 million drones, 250,000 per month, two-thirds of the manufacturing goal. The July 2025 fiber optic drone deliveries caused the March 2025 'drones account for 70%' figure to go stale, but even back then, they reported spikes of 90%. On 25 January 2026, Ukraine's Defence Minister said that 352,000 fibre-optic FPV drones had been delivered to the AFU since July 2025. Ukraine plans to manufacture over 7 million drones in 2026, 583,000 per month, 55% more than 2025. Two-thirds of the 2026 manufacturing goal (as was achieved in 2025) would be 388,000 per mo.

Since 2024, Ukrainian forces have fielded an emergent class of heavy bomber multirotor UAVs (quad‑, hexa‑ and octocopters) known as "Baba Yaga". These platforms carry payloads of 15–30 kg and have operational ranges of 15–30 km; they are produced by multiple Ukrainian manufacturers and are employed for both precision strikes and tactical resupply in contested areas. The most common models as of early 2026 are five.

On 28 January 2026, at the Army of Drones e-Points event, President Zelenskyy said that drones now account for over 80% of Russian casualties. 22,770 drone strikes per month hit Russian personnel, routinely more than 1 troop per strike. Drone operators specifically prioritize groups (clusters) of soldiers. In half the vids, a second Russian soldier gets hit.

The 414th Unmanned Systems Brigade ("Birds of Madyar"), led by Robert Brovdi, is one of the most transparent sources. They use a digitized "e-points" system to verify every kill with video evidence. Their data shows that in high-intensity months like December 2025, their units alone were neutralizing an average of 388 soldiers per day. In 2023, in their specific sectors (like Krynky or Pokrovsk), drones were cited as the cause for nearly 90% of tactical-level losses.

==== Artificial Intelligence in drone capabilities ====
Since early 2025, both Russia and Ukraine have increasingly experimented with integrating artificial intelligence (AI) and machine learning (ML) into drone platforms, although widespread battlefield autonomy remains limited. Military analysts note that both sides are exploring AI to automate functions such as navigation, target recognition, and resistance to electronic warfare. These technologies allow drones to follow preprogrammed routes and complete terminal targeting even when communication links are disrupted. This type of partial autonomy reduces the reliance on constant human input while still keeping operators in the loop.

One high-profile case was Ukraine's Operation Spiderweb, where AI-enhanced quadcopters reportedly carried out strikes on Russian air bases. According to reports, these drones used autonomous navigation and anti-jamming technologies to locate targets after losing contact with their command systems. The drones attacked four airfields including Olenya and Ivanovo and targeted Tu-95 bombers and A-50 radar planes. Ukraine claimed that these strikes impaired Russia's airborne readiness.

On the Russian side, reports indicate that reconnaissance and strike UAVs are being upgraded with ML capabilities that improve operational range and resilience against electronic warfare. Orlan-10 and Orlan-30 drones have been observed flying up to 120 km into contested areas, while loitering munitions such as Lancets are now able to hit targets at ranges beyond 70 km Analysts suggest that these improvements are meant to enhance target accuracy and battlefield coordination through AI-supported data processing, but these systems still rely on human oversight.

Ukraine has also advanced its AI use through the "Brave1" innovation platform and the battlefield management system Delta. Delta integrates drone reconnaissance data with other sources such as satellite feeds and ground sensors to provide real-time situational awareness. This helps commanders accelerate decision-making and assign drone or artillery responses more efficiently. The final choice to engage targets remains with human operators, but AI contributes to faster data processing and coordination.

Although neither side has fielded fully autonomous lethal drones, the growing use of AI for resilience to jamming, navigation, information integration, targeting and swarming is shaping the conflict. The reliance on semi-autonomous systems demonstrates that AI is becoming a central element of drone warfare, even if human control continues to play a decisive role.

=== Air vs air warfare ===
During the beginning of the war Russian air force employed Su-30SM and Su-35S for air superiority missions over Ukraine.

On 9 May 2022, a Russian Su-35 fighter shot down a Mi-14 helicopter from the Ukrainian Navy Aviation killing Colonel Igor Bedzay, deputy head of the Ukrainian aircraft division of the Navy.

As of August 2023, Russian aircraft was credited to have shot down 12 Ukrainian aircraft in air vs air engagements.

=== Anti-ship aerial attacks ===
26 December 2023, reportedly using air-launched cruise missiles, Ukraine's Air Force attacked the Novocherkassk, a major Russian landing craft docked in Feodosia, southern Crimea. Ukraine said the ship had launched cruise missiles against Ukrainian cities. The attack resulted in multiple explosions and fires. Ukraine said munitions aboard were detonated by the attack, and the ship was destroyed—unlikely to return to service. Russian authorities and media confirmed the attack, but did not confirm the ship's loss, adding that two attacking aircraft were shot down. Independent analysts said the ship's loss would substantially impede future Russian attacks on Ukraine's coast.

== See also ==
- List of aviation shootdowns and accidents during the Russo-Ukrainian war
- Proposed no-fly zone in the Russian invasion of Ukraine
- Iran and the Russo-Ukrainian war
- Naval warfare in the Russo-Ukrainian war
- Northrop Grumman M-ACE

== Bibliography ==
- Jones, Seth G.; Harrington, Jake; Reid, Christopher K.; Strohmeyer, Matthew (10 November 2022). "COMBINED ARMS WARFARE AND UNMANNED AIRCRAFT SYSTEMS A NEW ERA OF STRATEGIC COMPETITION" (PDF). Center for Strategic and International Studies.
- Ramani, Samuel (2023). Putin's War on Ukraine. C. Hurst & Co. ISBN 978-1-78738-851-2.
- Jones, Seth G. (June 2022). "Russia's Ill-Fated Invasion of Ukraine" (PDF). Center for Strategic and International Studies.
- Zabrodskyi, Mykhaylo; Watling, Jack; Danylyuk, Oleksandr V; Reynolds, Nick (July 2022). "Preliminary Lessons in Conventional Warfighting from Russia's Invasion of Ukraine: February–July 2022" (PDF). RUSI.
- Plokhy, Serhii (2023). The Russo-Ukrainian War. Norton & Company. ISBN 978-1-324-05119-0.
- Matthews, Owen (2022). Overreach: The Inside Story of Putin's War Against Ukraine. HarperCollins. ISBN 978-0-00-856274-8.
- Galeotti, Mark (2022). Putin's Wars: From Chechnya to Ukraine. Osprey Publishing. ISBN 978-1-4728-4754-6.
- Williams, Ian (May 2023). "Putin's Missile War: Russia's Strike Campaign in Ukraine" (PDF). Center for Strategic and International Studies.
