= Pavel Kurachenko =

- Павел Павлович Кураченко
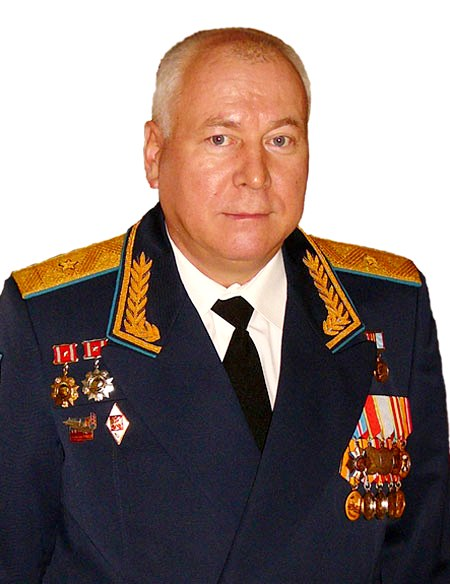
- Born: Pavel Pavlovich Kurachenko; 3 November 1961 (age 64); Zalissya, Ukrainian SSR, Soviet Union
- Military career
- Allegiance: Soviet Union (to 1991); Russia
- Branch: Soviet Air Force; Russian Air Force; Russian Aerospace Forces
- Service years: 1978–2018
- Rank: Lieutenant General
- Commands: Commander-in-Chief of the Aerospace Forces (acting)
- Conflicts: Russian military intervention in the Syrian Civil War

Lieutenant General Pavel Pavlovich Kurachenko (Russian: Павел Павлович Кураченко; born 3 November 1961) is a retired Russian military officer. He served as the acting Commander-in-Chief of the Russian Aerospace Forces in 2017.

Kurachenko was the chief of the General Staff - First Deputy Commander-in-Chief of the Russian Aerospace Forces from 2015 to 2018. He holds the rank of lieutenant general as of 2013.

== Biography ==
Kurachenko was born on 3 November 1961. In 1983, he graduated from the Krasnoyarsk Higher Command School of Air Defence Radio Electronics. He undertook further education over his career, graduating from the Zhukov Air and Space Defence Academy in 1998, and in 2005, he attended the Military Academy of the General Staff of the Armed Forces of Russia.

Kurachenko served in the positions of chief of a radar station, commander of a radar company, deputy commander of a radio engineering brigade, commander of a radio engineering brigade, chief of staff of the 76th Air Defense Division, 54th Air Defense Corps from 2005 to 2007. From October 2007 to August 2009, he was the Chief of Staff - First Deputy Chief of the Radio Engineering Troops of the Air Force.

By Decree of the President of Russia on 18 August 2009, Kurachenko was appointed Chief of Staff - First Deputy Chief of Air Defence of the Russian Air Force. From 2012 to 2013, he was the head of Air Defense of the Air Force.

On 12 June 2013, Kurachenko became a lieutenant general. Between December 2013 to July 2015, he was the Chief of Staff - First Deputy Commander of the Russian Aerospace Defence Forces. On 11 November 2014, he was appointed Deputy Chairman of the Air Defence Coordinating Committee under the Council of Ministers of Defence of the Commonwealth of Independent States.

After the creation of a new branch of the Armed Forces - the Russian Aerospace Forces, by Decree of the President of the Russian Federation No. 394 dated 1 August 2015, Kurachenko was appointed Chief of the General Staff - First Deputy Commander-in-Chief of the Aerospace Forces. On 26 September 2017, Kurachenko became the acting in Commander-in-Chief of the Aerospace Forces. On 22 November, he was replaced by his successor Sergey Surovikin. In July 2018, he was relieved of his duties as the deputy commander.

Military offices
Preceded by Sergei Popov	Commander of the 1st Special Purpose Air and Missile Defense Army; 2013	Succeeded by Andrei Demin
Preceded by Viktor Bondarev	Commander-in-Chief of the Russian Aerospace Forces; Acting; 2017	Succeeded by Sergey Surovikin
Preceded by Position established	Chief of the Main Staff and First Deputy Commander-in-Chief of the Aerospace Forces; 2015–2018	Succeeded by Viktor Afzalov
