= 1st Special Purpose Air and Missile Defense Army =

1st Moscow Order of Lenin Special Purpose Air and Missile Defense Army
- 1-я Московская ордена Ленина армия противовоздушной и противоракетной обороны особого назначения
- Active: 2015–present
- Branch: Russian Aerospace Forces; Air and Missile Defense Forces
- Type: Air defence
- Size: Field army
- Decorations: Order of Lenin
- Battle honours: Moscow

Commanders
- Current commander: Maj. Gen. Igor Nikitin

The 1st Moscow Order of Lenin Special Purpose Air and Missile Defense Army (Russian: 1-я Московская ордена Ленина армия противовоздушной и противоракетной обороны особого назначения) is a military formation of the Russian Air and Missile Defense Forces tasked with defending assets of high strategic value in Russia, primarily the Moscow region and its surroundings where much of the military leadership is located together with a large part of the Russian population centers. The unit is the only one equipped with the A-135M anti-ballistic missile system.

== History ==
The army traces its history back to the Moscow Air Defense District, which was awarded the Order of Lenin on 22 February 1968. In 1998, the district was combined with the 16th Air Army and reorganized as the Directorate of the Moscow District of the Air Force and Air Defense. In 2002, it was reformed into the Special Purpose Command.

In 2009, as part of the ongoing Russian military reform, the Special Purpose Command and its 1st Air Defense Corps were merged into the Directorate of Operational-Strategic Command of Aerospace Defense, headquartered in Balashikha, Moscow Oblast. The 16th Air Army was disbanded and its units were transferred to the 1st Air and Air Defense Forces Command.

In 2011, after the creation of the new Aerospace Defense branch, the unit was once again reformed into the Directorate of the Air Defense and Missile Defense Command of the Aerospace Defense Forces. It included the 9th Missile Defense Division and the 4th, 5th, and 6th air defense brigades.

In 2013–2015, the Russian military underwent reforms, which resulted in the Russian Aerospace Defense and the Air Force combining into the Russian Aerospace Forces. As part of these reforms, the unit was renamed the 1st Air and Missile Defense Army, and its brigades were reformed into the 4th, 5th, and 32nd divisions, with the latter being transferred to the 1st Air and Air Defense Forces Command.

=== Russian invasion of Ukraine ===
During the war, the army engaged Ukrainian drones, which targeted Moscow on multiple occasions. Notable incidents included the Kremlin drone attack and Moscow drone strikes, which both happened in May 2023. At least eight drones were involved in the latter case, five of which were shot down by anti-air missiles, while the other three were suppressed by electronic warfare systems.

In July 2023, the army commander, Major General Konstantin Ogienko, was removed from his post over a bribery investigation and subsequently arrested in September.

On 6 October 2025, the army was awarded the honorary designation "Moscow".

== Equipment ==
To defend the airspace above Moscow from as many types of threats as possible the unit operates air defense systems with varying specific purpose:

- A-135M anti-ballistic missile system
- S-400 radar and missile system
- S-300PM2 radar and missile system
- Pantsir-S medium range missile system

== Structure ==
Structure of the formation as of 2023:

- 4th Air Defense Division named after Hero of the Soviet Union Lt.-Gen. B. P. Kirpikov (Dolgoprudny, Moscow Oblast, MUN 52116, armed with the S-300PM/PS and the S-400 missile systems)
- 5th Air Defense Division (Petrovskoe, Moscow Oblast, MUN 52096, armed with the S-300PM and the S-400 missile systems)
- 9th Anti-Ballistic Missile Defense Division (Sofrino, Moscow Oblast, MUN 75555, armed with the A-135 anti-ballistic missile system)
  - 900th Command Center (MUN 20007)
  - 164th Command and Computing Center (MUN 52361, using 5K80)
  - 102nd Anti Missile Center (MUN 48701)
  - 15th Anti Missile Complex (MUN 51087)
  - 16th Anti Missile Complex (MUN 51086)
  - 49th Anti Missile Complex (MUN 51084)
  - 50th Anti Missile Complex (MUN 51085)
  - 89th Anti Missile Complex (MUN 51089)
  - 34th Communications Regiment (MUN 12517)
  - 482th Communications Unit (MUN 03523, using the Don-2N radar)
  - 572nd Communications Unit (MUN 03863, using the Don-2N radar)
  - 1876th Technical Base (MUN 02014)

== Commanders ==
- Major General Leonid Tishkevich, 1 June 2009 – October 2010;
- Lieutenant General Valery Ivanov, 2010 – 8 November 2011;
- Major General Sergei Popov, 2011–2013;
- Lieutenant General Pavel Kurachenko, March 2013 – December 2013;
- Lieutenant General Andrei Demin, 2 December 2013 – 2021;
- Major General Konstantin Ogienko, 2021–2023;
- Major General Igor Nikitin, 2023–present

== See also ==
- Attacks in Russia during the Russian invasion of Ukraine
