= Air and Missile Defense Forces =

Branch of the Russian Aerospace Forces

- Great emblem of the Russian Air and Missile Defense Forces
- Active: 1992–1998; 2015–present
- Country: Russia
- Part of: Russian Aerospace Forces

Commanders
- Commander-in-Chief of the Aerospace Forces: Colonel General Aleksandr Chayko
- Commander of the Air and Missile Defense Forces: Lieutenant General Andrey Semyonov

The Air and Missile Defense Forces (Russian: Войска противовоздушной и противоракетной обороны, Войска ПВО-ПРО or Voiska PVO-PRO) is one of three branches of the Russian Aerospace Forces. The branch was formed in 2015 during the creation of the Russian Aerospace Forces as the branch responsible for all strategic land-based air defense.

The Air Defense Forces (PVO) were a separate branch of the Russian Armed Forces from 1992 until 1998, when it was merged into the Russian Air Force. In 2010 the four corps and seven divisions of the PVO within the Air Force were reorganized into 11 anti-air defense brigades.

The primary combat formation of the branch is the 1st Special Purpose Air and Missile Defense Army. It includes nine surface-to-air missile regiments, with four equipped with the S-300 system and five with the S-400 and Pantsir systems.

== Structure ==
Structure of the branch as of 2023:

- 1st Special Purpose Air and Missile Defense Army
- Zhukov Air and Space Defence Academy
- Yaroslavl Higher Military School of Anti-Aircraft Warfare

== Commanders ==
- Army General Viktor Prudnikov (1992–1997)
- Colonel General Viktor Sinitsyn (1997–1998)
- Lieutenant General Viktor Gumyony (2015–2018)
- Colonel General Yuri Grekhov (2018–2021)
- Lieutenant General Andrey Dyomin (2021–2023)
- Lieutenant General Andrey Semyonov (2023–)

== Equipment ==
=== Anti-ballistic missile systems ===
Type	Image	Origin	Description	Quantity	Notes
А-135		Soviet Union	Anti-missile defense complex	n/a	
53Т6	безрамки	Soviet Union	Anti-missile defense battery	68	

=== Surface-to-air missile systems ===
Type	Image	Origin	Description	Quantity	Notes
S-400		Russia	Long range surface-to-air missile system	240	
S-300PM1/PM2		Russia	Long range surface-to-air missile system	300	
Pantsir-S1		Russia	Medium range surface-to-air missile system	36	

== Sources ==
- IISS (2024). The Military Balance 2024. London: Routledge. ISBN 978-1-032-78004-7.
