= Sergey Surovikin =

Russian military officer (born 1966)

- Сергей Суровикин
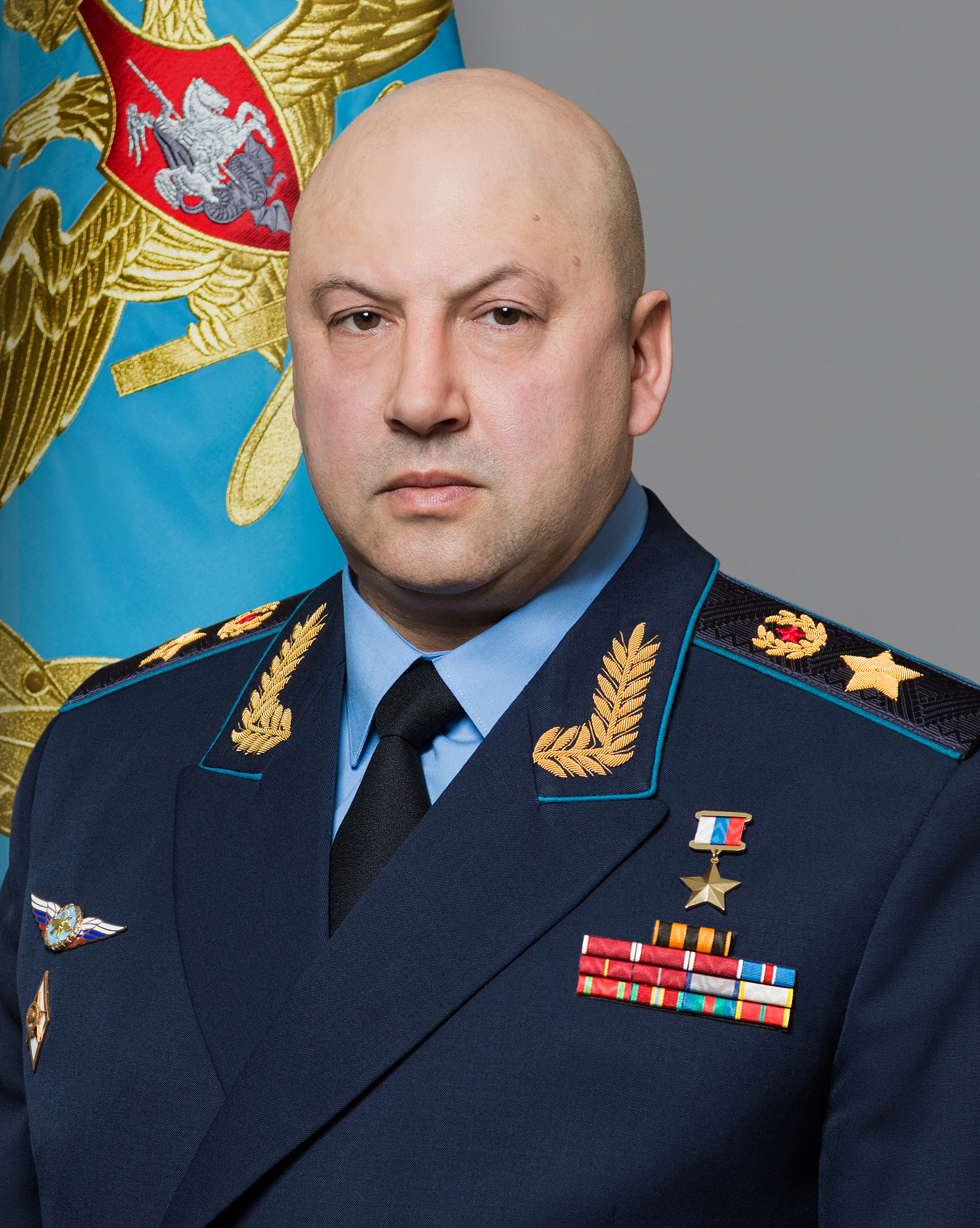
- Official portrait, 2021

Head of the CIS' Coordinating Committee for Air Defence
- Incumbent
- Assumed office 10 September 2023

Commander-in-Chief of the Aerospace Forces
- In office 22 November 2017 – 22 August 2023
- President: Vladimir Putin
- Preceded by: Viktor Bondarev
- Succeeded by: Viktor Afzalov

Commander of the Joint Group of Forces in the Special Military Operation zone
- In office 8 October 2022 – 11 January 2023
- Preceded by: Gennady Zhidko
- Succeeded by: Valery Gerasimov

Deputy Commander of the Joint Group of Forces in the Special Military Operation zone
- In office 11 January 2023 – 22 August 2023 Serving with Oleg Salyukov & Alexei Kim
- Succeeded by: Oleg Salyukov & Alexei Kim

Personal details
- Born: 11 October 1966 (age 60) Novosibirsk, Soviet Union
- Awards: Hero of the Russian Federation; Order of St. George; Order of Courage (3); Order of Military Merit; Order of the Red Star
- Nickname(s): General Armageddon; Butcher of Syria

Military service
- Allegiance: Soviet Union; Russia
- Branch/service: Soviet Ground Forces; Russian Ground Forces; Russian Aerospace Forces
- Years of service: 1987–present
- Rank: General of the Army
- Commands: 34th Motor Rifle Division; 42nd Guards Motor Rifle Division; 20th Guards Army; Eastern Military District; Group of Forces in Syria; Russian Aerospace Forces
- Battles/wars: Soviet–Afghan War; August Coup; Tajikistani Civil War; Second Chechen War; Syrian Civil War; Russo-Ukrainian War; Russian invasion of Ukraine

General of the Army Sergey Vladimirovich Surovikin (Note: In this name that follows East Slavic naming customs, the patronymic is Vladimirovich and the family name is Surovikin.) (Note: Russian: Сергей Владимирович Суровикин) (born 11 October 1966) is a Russian military officer who has served as head of the Coordinating Committee for Air Defence under the Council of Defence Ministers of the Commonwealth of Independent States (CIS) since September 2023.

From 2017 to August 2023, Surovikin was the Commander-in-Chief of the Russian Aerospace Forces from 2017 until he was reportedly sacked by Vladimir Putin for an alleged involvement with the Wagner Group rebellion. A veteran of the Soviet–Afghan War, Tajikistani Civil War, Second Chechen War, and the Russian military intervention in the Syrian civil war, he was from October 2022 to January 2023 the commander of all Russian forces in the Russo-Ukrainian war and deputy commander from January 2023 to August 2023.

During the 1991 Soviet coup d'état attempt, Surovikin commanded a unit that killed three anti-coup demonstrators, for which he was detained for several months but never convicted. He played an important role in the creation of the Main Directorate of the Military Police, a new organisation within the Russian army. Surovikin commanded the Eastern Military District between 2013 and 2017, and in 2017 commanded the Russian group of forces in Syria. He is accredited with turning the tide of the war in Syrian president Bashar al-Assad's favour, and is also alleged to have been responsible for strikes on civilian targets during the Russian intervention.

During the Russian invasion of Ukraine, Surovikin was initially the commander of the Southern Grouping of Forces of the Russian Armed Forces. On 8 October 2022, he became the commander of all Russian forces invading Ukraine, but was demoted to deputy commander and replaced by Valery Gerasimov in January 2023. In late June 2023, rumors about his arrest emerged, according to unconfirmed reports following alleged involvement with the Wagner Group rebellion. Surovikin's daughter claimed to be in contact with her father and insisted that he had not been detained.

On 10 September 2023, Surovikin was elected as head of the Coordinating Committee for Air Defence under the Council of Defence Ministers of the Commonwealth of Independent States (CIS). His official visit to Algeria soon after dispelled all rumors about his whereabouts.

== Early life and education ==
Surovikin was born in Novosibirsk, Soviet Union, on 11 October 1966. He graduated from the Omsk Higher Combined Arms Command School in 1987.

== Military career ==
=== Early career and military academy attendance ===
He was assigned to a spetsnaz unit and served in the Soviet–Afghan War.

By August 1991, he was a captain and commander of the 1st Motor Rifle Battalion of the 15th Guards Motor Rifle Regiment, part of the 2nd Guards Tamanskaya Motor Rifle Division. During the 1991 Soviet coup d'état attempt in Moscow, Surovikin was ordered to send his battalion into the tunnel on the Garden Ring, where three anti-coup demonstrators were killed. After the defeat of the coup, Surovikin was arrested and held under investigation for seven months. The charges were dropped on 10 December because Boris Yeltsin concluded that Surovikin was only following orders. He was promoted to the rank of major afterwards.

Surovikin attended the Frunze Military Academy. In September 1995, he was sentenced to a year of probation by the Moscow garrison's military court for illegally selling weapons. The conviction was overturned after the investigation concluded that Surovikin had agreed to give a fellow student a pistol for use in a competition, unaware of its intended purpose.

In 1995, he graduated from the Frunze Military Academy. Surovikin participated in the Tajikistani Civil War where he commanded a motor rifle battalion. He then became chief of staff of the 92nd Motor Rifle Regiment, chief of staff and commander of the 149th Guards Motor Rifle Regiment and chief of staff of the 201st Motor Rifle Division.

In 2002, he graduated from the Military Academy of the General Staff. He became commander of the 34th Motor Rifle Division at Yekaterinburg.

=== Suicide of subordinate ===
In March 2004, Surovikin was accused by Lieutenant Colonel Viktor Tsibizov of beating him up for leaving his post to participate in elections as an observer. In April, division deputy commander for armaments Colonel Andrei Shtakal shot himself in the presence of Surovikin and the district deputy commander after being criticized by Surovikin. In both cases, a military prosecutor found no evidence of guilt.

=== Chechnya ===
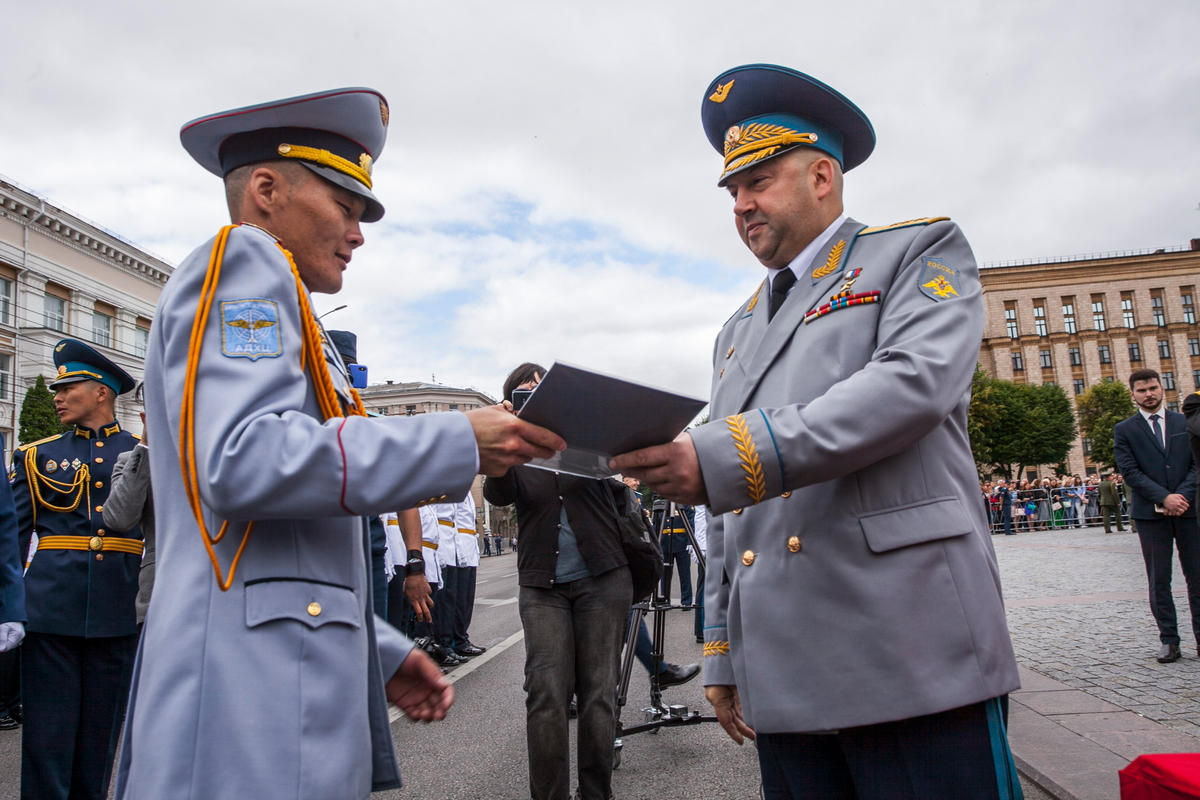
Surovikin at a graduation of officers at the Air Force Academy in Voronezh, 2019

From June 2004, he led the 42nd Guards Motor Rifle Division, permanently stationed in Chechnya to suppress the insurgency during the Second Chechen War. After nine soldiers from the division died in the collapse of a farm building on 21 February 2005, an incident officially blamed on an insurgent-fired rocket-propelled grenade, Surovikin publicly promised to "destroy three insurgents for every soldier killed," in spite of the policy that required insurgents to be handed over to authorities. Investigation by independent news organization Novaya Gazeta revealed that the deaths were caused by the accidental discharge of a grenade launcher by drunk soldiers. In an April interview with army newspaper Krasnaya Zvezda, Surovikin complained that rules of engagement, especially the requirement to detain suspected militants instead of shooting them, hindered counter-insurgency operations, and that Chechen fighters were exploiting Russian soldiers' hesitation to fire on insurgents near civilians. For his rhetoric, he gained a reputation in the press as a tough commander with an "iron fist."

In June, Surovikin ordered the Borozdinovskaya cleansing operation to "search for and detain insurgents," in which soldiers of the division's Vostok Battalion burned down houses, beat 87 civilians, killed one elderly man, and abducted eleven civilians. Surovikin categorically denied that the abductions took place, but the company commander responsible was convicted of abuse of power.

=== Senior command roles ===
Returning from Chechnya, Surovikin was appointed deputy commander of the 20th Guards Combined Arms Army in Voronezh in November 2005, rising to serve as its chief of staff from May 2006 and army commander from April 2008.

In November 2008, Surovikin became head of the Main Operational Directorate of the General Staff. In January 2010, he became chief of staff of the Volga–Urals Military District, which soon became part of the Central Military District.

From November 2011, he headed the working group charged with creation of the Military Police. It was reported that Surovikin was tipped to head the Military Police after it was instituted, but the appointment did not materialise due to the intervention of the Russian Military Prosecutor's Office, according to the Russian media, which presented the situation as a turf conflict between the Defence Ministry and the Military Prosecutor's Office. In October 2012, he became the chief of staff of the Eastern Military District. In October 2013, he was appointed commander of the district. On 13 December, Surovikin was promoted to the rank of colonel general.

=== Syrian civil war ===
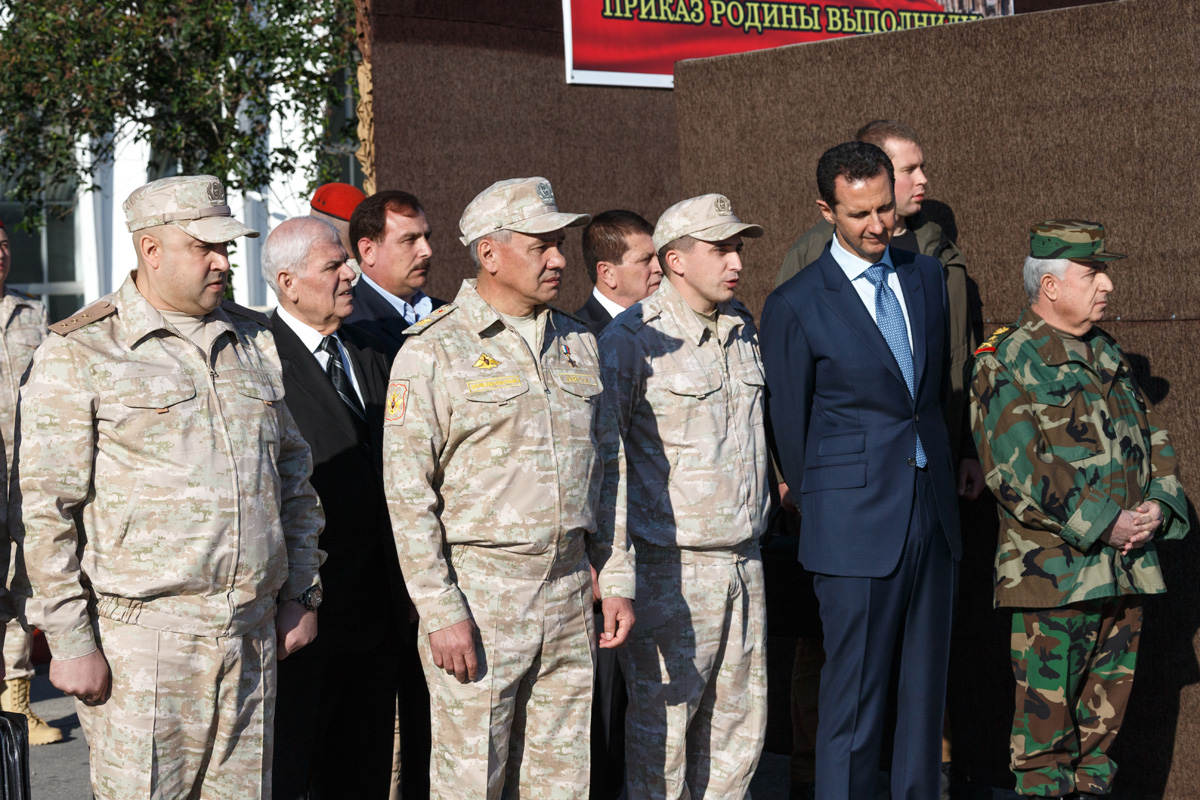
Surovikin (left) with Minister of Defence Sergei Shoigu, Bashar al-Assad and Syrian Minister of Defence Ali Ayyoub in 2017

On 9 June 2017, he was introduced to news media representatives as the Commander of the Russian armed forces deployed to Syria. Reportedly, he took this position in March 2017.

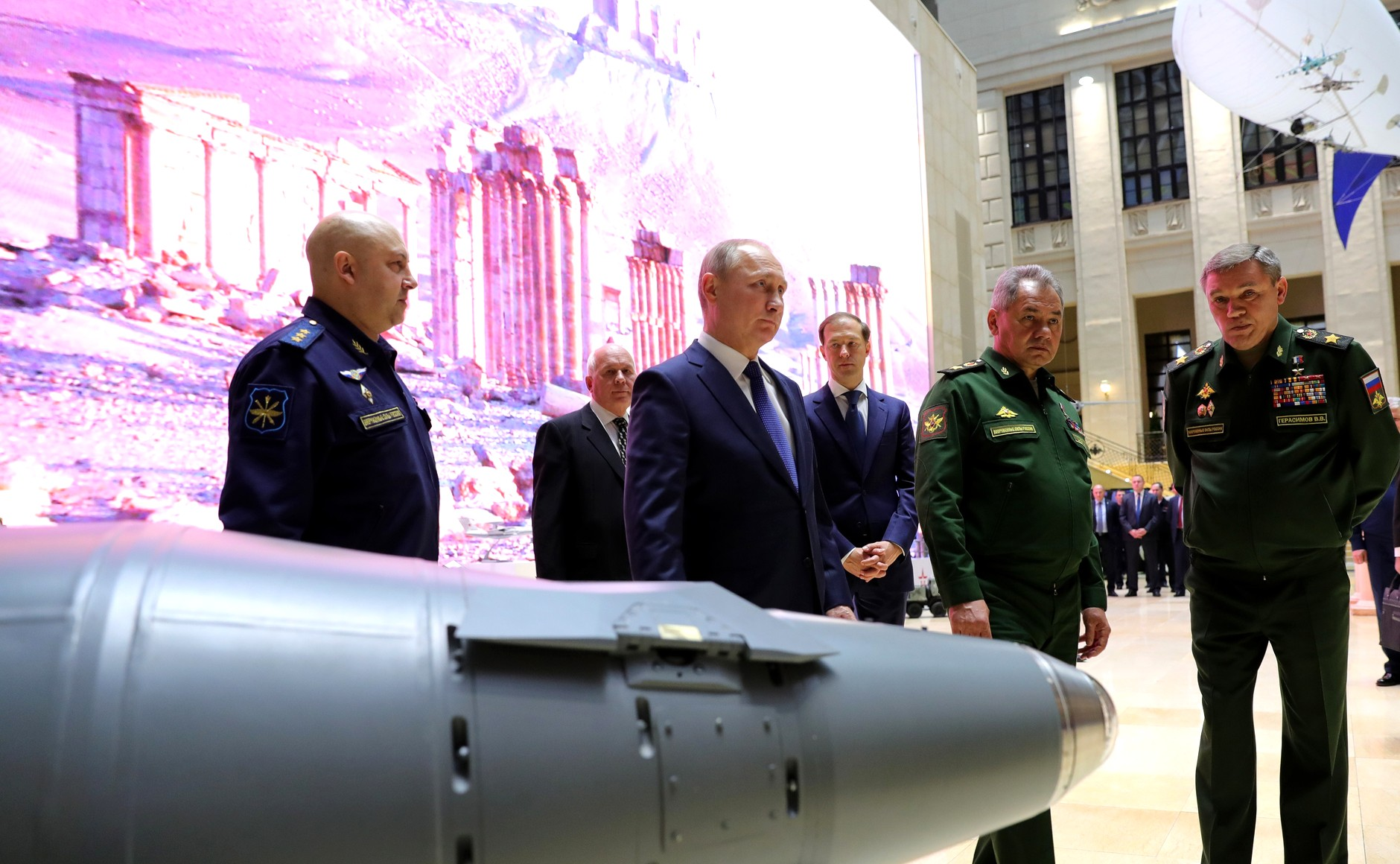
Surovikin (left) with Russian President Vladimir Putin, Sergey Shoigu and Valery Gerasimov in 2018

In September 2017, Surovikin was cited by Russian media as a likely successor to Viktor Bondarev, who was on 26 September relieved of the position of the Commander of the Aerospace Forces. According to a report published by RBK Group on 2 November 2017 that cited an anonymous source in the MoD, Surovikin had been appointed Commander of the Aerospace Forces, despite his initial objections. At the end of November 2017, the Russian MoD's Krasnaya Zvezda reported that Surovikin had been appointed Commander of the Aerospace Forces by a presidential decree of 22 November. TASS pointed out that Surovikin became the first combined-arms commander in the history of Russia and the Soviet Union to be put in charge of the Russian or Soviet air forces.

On 28 December 2017, he was made a Hero of the Russian Federation for his leadership of the Group of Forces in Syria. Under his command, a significant turning point in the fight against the Syrian opposition was achieved. The Syrian Government regained over 50% control of Syria by the end of 2017 after a string of successful military campaigns. According to several Russian military commentators, it was Surovikin who turned the tide of the war.

Surovikin took command of the contingent of Russian military forces in Syria again from January to April 2019. Altogether he commanded the Russian forces group in Syria for more than a year, which was longer than any other officer until November 2020, when Lieutenant General Aleksandr Chaiko surpassed his duration in that post.

An October 2020 Human Rights Watch report listed Surovikin as one of the commanders "who may bear command responsibility for violations" during the 2019–2020 offensive in Idlib, Syria.

In 2021, Surovikin was promoted to General of the Army. As one of only a handful of officers at that rank, it prompted speculation that he might be an eventual successor to Valery Gerasimov as Chief of the General Staff.

=== Russian invasion of Ukraine ===
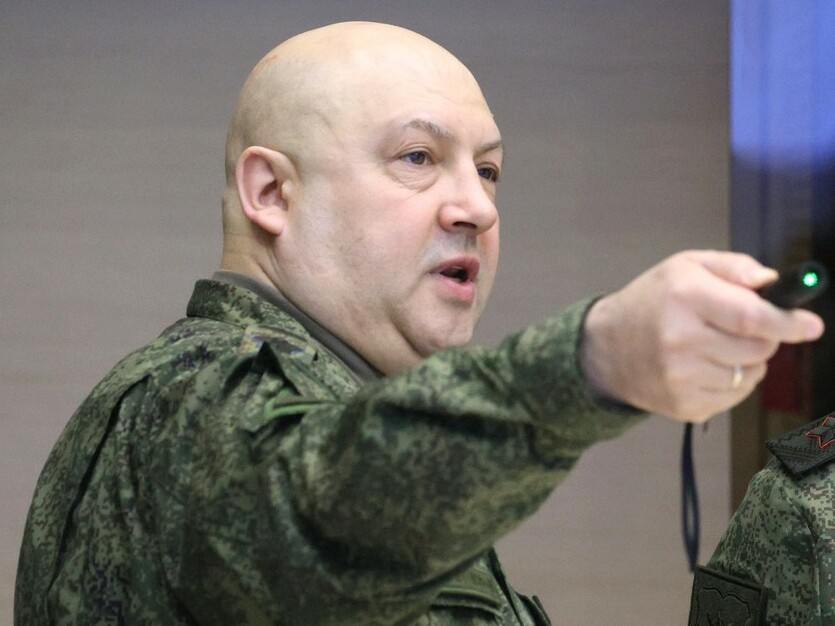
Surovikin in December 2022

In June 2022, it came to light that he was in command of the Southern Grouping of Forces of the Russian Armed Forces in the Southern Ukraine campaign. On 28 September, he was awarded the title Hero of the Luhansk People's Republic. He said in an interview with Russian media that "Our opponent is a criminal regime, while we and the Ukrainians are one people and want the same thing: for Ukraine to be a country that’s friendly to Russia and independent from the West". The quote "For the enemies of Russia, the morning does not start with coffee." alludes to these strikes and is attributed to him, although it is most likely apocryphal.

Surovikin is the eponym of the Surovikin line, a line of trenches, minefields, and other fortifications which Russia built ahead of the 2023 Ukrainian counteroffensive, which began in June. Surovikin had the line built during his tenure as the overall theater commander immediately after a major Ukrainian counteroffensive operation in September 2022.

It has been reported by The New York Times in October 2022, amid a Ukrainian counteroffensive in the Kherson Oblast, American intelligence became aware that Surovikin had discussed the use of tactical nuclear weapons to prevent the Ukrainians from crossing the Dnieper River and reaching Crimea. This caused the U.S. intelligence community to reassess their estimated likelihood that Russia would use nuclear weapons in Ukraine from 5-10% to 50% in the case that Russian lines in the south collapsed.

On 8 October, it was announced that Surovikin would be commanding all Russian forces in Ukraine, succeeding Colonel General Gennady Zhidko. It came to light on 10 October according to sources close to the Kremlin, that Surovikin is a proponent of large-scale attacks by drone and missile on civilian and critical infrastructure, an instance of which occurred that day. On 13 October Surovikin was profiled in Le Monde as a "ruthless Russian general", while two days later CNN reported that he was hated by some of his subordinates. On 18 October Surovikin was reported as saying that "The situation in the area of the 'Special Military Operation' can be described as tense". On 20 October the Ukrainians had turned to energy rationing. By 22 October, Fortune was headlining the campaign by "Russia launches ‘massive attack’ on Ukraine’s energy infrastructure after failures on battlefield", after 1.5 million people were left with no electric utility. On 26 October Politico asked itself the question: "Can Putin’s ‘Butcher of Syria’ save Russia from another rout?"

On 9 November 2022, in a televised meeting with Russian defence minister Sergei Shoigu, Surovikin, made a public statement on Russian media—along with other military staff—recommending a withdrawal of Russian forces from Kherson in order to save Russian troops who faced being trapped. In the same TV appearance, Shoigu approved the withdrawal. On 10 November sources in Kyiv said that Surovikin's conduct of the war was more brutal and more disciplined. Ukrainian minister of defence Oleksii Reznikov said that Surovikin was using a "doctrine of terrorists".

By 21 November 2022 some Russian people were asking Surovikin "to step up Moscow's bombing campaign of Ukrainian energy infrastructure, a tactic the Kremlin has suggested is designed to bring Ukraine to the negotiating table." Vladimir Solovyov said: "I appeal to the Hero of Russia Army General Surovikin: Comrade Army General, I ask you to complete the total destruction of energy infrastructure of the Nazi Ukrainian junta."

On 11 January 2023, Chief of the General Staff of the Russian Armed Forces Valery Gerasimov took over from Surovikin as commander of all Russian forces in Ukraine, with Surovikin becoming one of his deputies.

=== Wagner rebellion ===
In May 2023, Surovikin was reported to have been "representing interests" of the Wagner Group in Russia's Ministry of Defense for the last few years. According to CNN, documentary evidence listed Surovikin as an official member of Wagner, with VIP status in 2018, along with 30 other senior Russian military staff.

On 24 June 2023, during the Wagner Group rebellion against the Russian government, Surovikin appeared on video posted to Telegram appealing to the rebel forces to stop the revolt. He had not appeared in public in the weeks following the rebellion. Some reports suggest that he was arrested, citing anonymous defense ministry officials. Surovikin's daughter, in an alleged interview to a Russian Telegram channel, claimed to be in contact with her father and insisted that he had not been detained. The Wall Street Journal reported on 13 July that Surovikin had been detained, according to "people familiar with the situation." State Duma defense committee chairman Andrey Kartapolov told the media that Surovikin was "on vacation and unavailable," while Readovka reported that Surovikin was on vacation in Rostov. Reports of his imprisonment were repeatedly denied by the secretary of the Moscow prison watchdog committee.

As of 6 September 2023, Surovikin's biography was removed from the official ministry of defense website since his disappearance.

=== Head of the CIS Coordinating Committee for Air Defence ===
On 10 September 2023, Surovikin was unanimously elected head of the Coordinating Committee for Air Defence under the Council of Defence Ministers of the Commonwealth of Independent States (CIS). In this official role, he visited Algeria on 15 September, putting an end to speculations about his whereabouts.

=== Possible Return to Ukraine War ===
In October 2026, Surovkin was reported to have been given responsibility for attempts to destroy Ukraine's civilian infrastructure in a similar manner to his campaign of war crimes in Syria.

== Awards ==
Surovikin has been awarded the Order of the Red Star, the Order of Military Merit and the Order of Courage three times. He was awarded the title Hero of the Russian Federation in December 2017. On 31 December 2022, President Vladimir Putin personally awarded Surovikin the Order of St. George third class.

== Personal life ==
Surovikin is married and has four children. He is a member of the Russian Orthodox Church.

=== Sanctions ===
On 23 February 2022, Surovikin was added to the European Union sanctions list for being "responsible for actively supporting and implementing actions and policies that undermine and threaten the territorial integrity, sovereignty and independence of Ukraine as well as the stability or security in Ukraine".

== See also ==
- List of Heroes of the Russian Federation

Military offices
Preceded by Aleksandr Dyagtev	Commander of the 34th Motor Rifle Division; 2002–2004	Succeeded by Viktor Chibizov
Preceded by Oleg Makarevich	Commander of the 42nd Guards Motor Rifle Division; 2004–2005	Succeeded by Sergei Minenkov
Preceded by Andrey Tretyak	Commander of the 20th Guards Army; 2005–2008	Succeeded by Farid Balaliyev; Acting
Preceded by Aleksandr Rukshin	Chief of the Main Operational Directorate of the General Staff; 2008–2010	Succeeded by Andrey Tretyak
Preceded by Vladimir Chirkin	Chief of Staff of the Volga–Ural Military District; 2010	District abolished
Preceded by ???	Chief of Staff of the Eastern Military District; 2012–2013	Succeeded by Aleksandr Lapin
Preceded by Konstantin Sidenko	Commander of the Eastern Military District; 2013–2017	Succeeded by Aleksandr Lapin
Preceded by Pavel Kurachenko; Acting	Commander of the Russian Aerospace Forces; 2017–2023	Succeeded by Viktor Afzalov
Preceded by Gennady Zhidko	Commander of the Joint Group of Forces in the Special Military Operation; 2022–2023	Succeeded by Valery Gerasimov
Position established	Deputy Commander of the Joint Group of Forces in the Special Military Operation; 2023; With: Oleg Salyukov and Alexei Kim	Succeeded by Oleg Salyukov and Alexei Kim
