= Viktor Afzalov =

Russian general (b. 1968)

- Виктор Афзалов
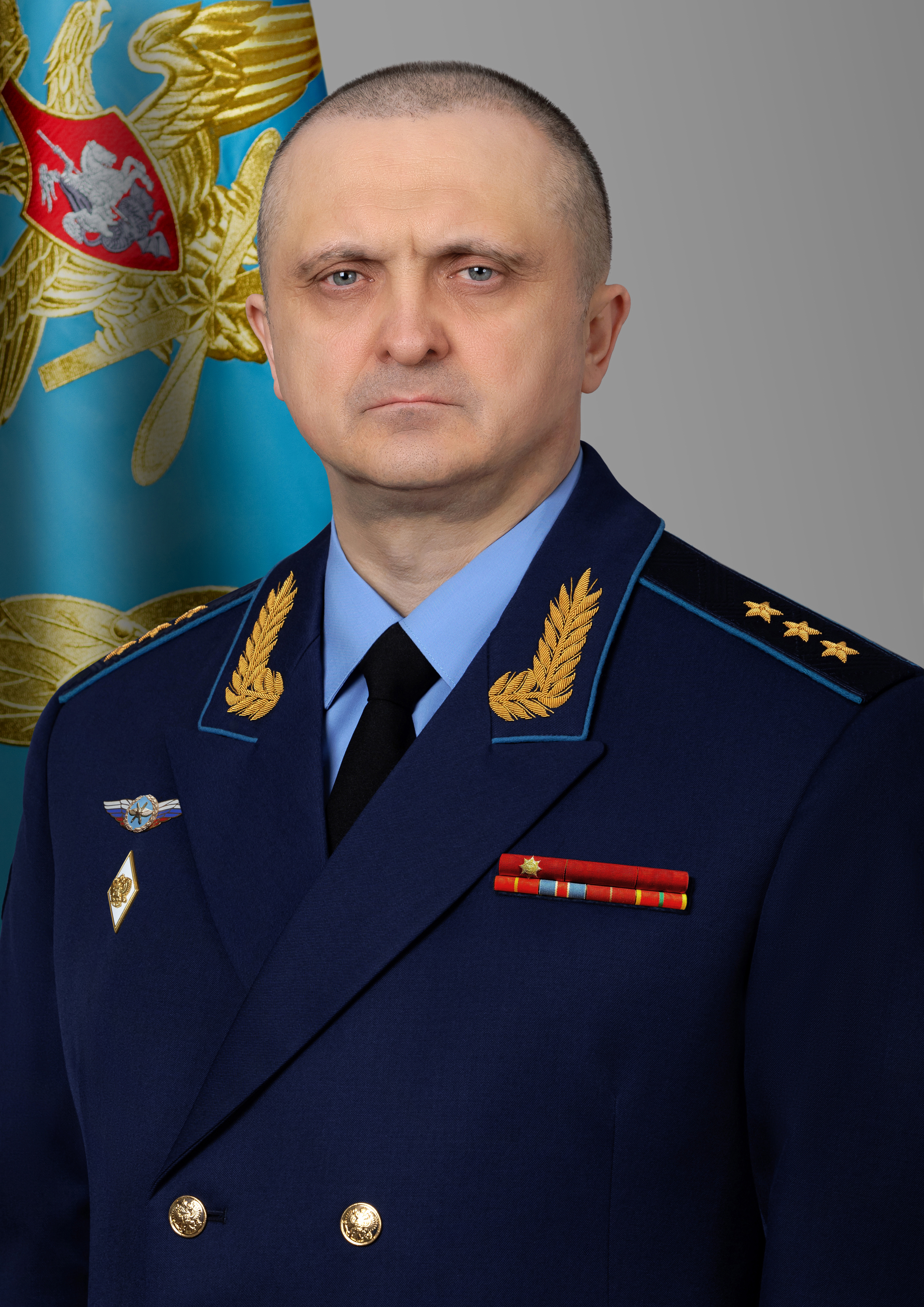
- Official portrait, 2023
- Born: Viktor Musavirovich Afzalov; 9 June 1968 (age 58); Ukromne, Crimea, Soviet Union
- Military career
- Allegiance: Soviet Union (to 1991); Russia
- Branch: Soviet Air Force; Russian Air Force; Russian Aerospace Forces
- Service years: 1989–present
- Rank: Colonel General
- Commands: Commander-in-Chief of the Aerospace Forces; 11th Air and Air Defence Forces Army
- Conflicts: Russo-Ukrainian War; Russian invasion of Ukraine

Colonel General Viktor Musavirovich Afzalov (Russian: Виктор Мусавирович Афзалов; born 9 June 1968) is a Russian military officer who has served as the Commander-in-Chief of the Aerospace Forces from 2023 until 2026.

Military offices
Preceded by Yevgeny Tuchkov	Commander of the 11th Air and Air Defence Forces Army; 2017–2018	Succeeded by Vladimir Kravchenko
Preceded by Pavel Kurachenko	Chief of the Main Staff and First Deputy Commander-in-Chief of the Russian Aerospace Forces; 2018–2023	Succeeded by Aleksandr Maksimtsev
Preceded by Sergey Surovikin	Commander-in-Chief of the Russian Aerospace Forces; 2023–2026	Succeeded by Aleksandr Chayko
