= Commander-in-Chief of the Aerospace Forces =

Commanding General of the Russian Aerospace Forces

Commander of the Russian Aerospace Forces
- Главнокомандующий Воздушно-космическими силами (Russian)
- Flag of the Commander of the Russian Aerospace Forces

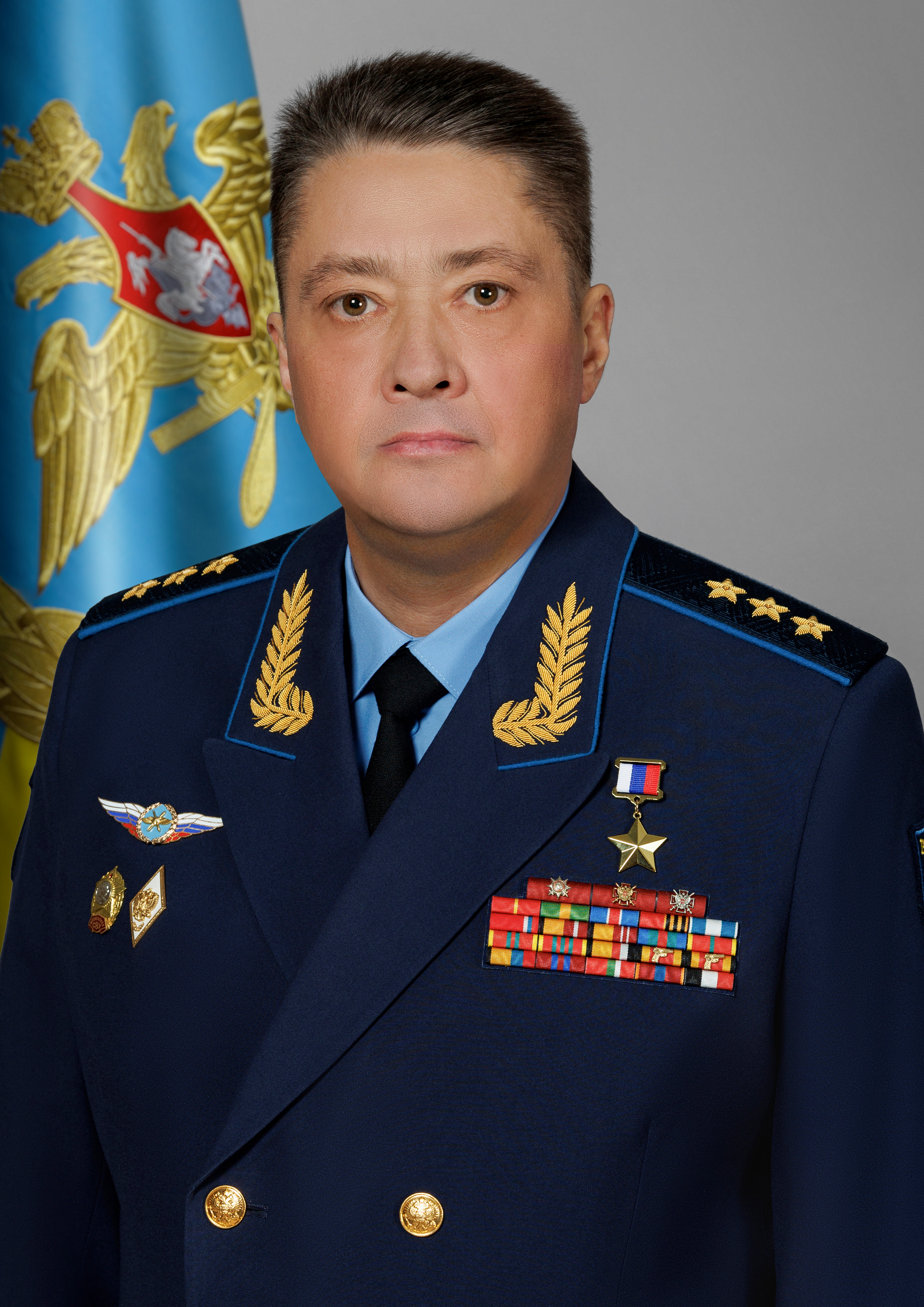
- Incumbent; Colonel general Aleksandr Chayko since 4 May 2026
- Russian Aerospace Forces
- Member of: General Staff of the Armed Forces
- Reports to: Chief of the General Staff
- Appointer: President of Russia
- Formation: 1 August 2015
- First holder: Viktor Bondarev
- Deputy: Commander of the Russian Air Force
- Website: Official website

The Commander-in-Chief of the Russian Aerospace Forces (Russian: Главнокомандующий Воздушно-космическими силами, romanized: Glavnokomándujuščij vozdúšno-kosmíčeskij sílami) is the chief commanding authority of the Russian Aerospace Forces. The position was created in 2015, when the Russian Air Force, Russian Air and Missile Defense Forces and Russian Space Forces where placed under a unified command. He is appointed by the President of Russia. The current commander is Colonel general Aleksandr Chayko.

== List of Commanders ==
No.	Portrait	Name (born–died)	Term of office			Ref.
No.	Portrait	Name (born–died)	Took office	Left office	Time in office	Ref.
1	Viktor Bondarev	Colonel general Viktor Bondarev (born 1959)	1 August 2015	26 September 2017	2 years, 56 days	
–	Pavel Kurachenko	Lieutenant general Pavel Kurachenko (born 1961); Acting	26 September 2017	22 November 2017	57 days	
2	Sergey Surovikin	Army general Sergey Surovikin (born 1966)	22 November 2017	22 August 2023	5 years, 273 days	
–		Colonel general Viktor Afzalov (born 1968)	22 August 2023	20 October 2023	59 days	
3		Colonel general Viktor Afzalov (born 1968)	20 October 2023	4 May 2026	2 years, 196 days	
4	Aleksandr Chayko	Colonel general Aleksandr Chayko (born 1971)	4 May 2026	Incumbent	126 days	
