= Viktor Prudnikov =

- Виктор Прудников
- Born: 4 February 1939; Rostov-on-Don, Soviet Union
- Died: 3 January 2015 (aged 75); Moscow, Russia
- Burial place: Federal Military Memorial Cemetery
- Alma mater: Armavir Military Aviation School; Gagarin Air Force Academy; Voroshilov General Staff Academy
- Military career
- Allegiance: Soviet Union (to 1991); Russia
- Branch: Soviet Air Force; Russian Air and Missile Defense Forces
- Service years: 1956–2004
- Rank: General of the Army
- Commands: Air and Missile Defense Forces
- Awards: Hero of the Russian Federation; Order "For Merit to the Fatherland"

General of the Army Viktor Alekseyevich Prudnikonv (Note: Russian: Виктор Алексеевич Прудников) (4 February 1939 - 3 January 2015) was a Russian military officer who served as the commander-in-chief of the Air and Missile Defense Forces. His previous commands included the Moscow Air Defence District.

== Biography ==
He was born into a large family (had 8 brothers and sisters). He lost his mother early, and in 1953 he was accepted to the Rostov Specialized School of the Air Force (a specialized educational institution that provides children with secondary education and basic knowledge in the field of aviation, in a sense an analogue of the Suvorov military schools).

In 1956 he was conscripted to the Soviet Armed Forces. In 1959, he graduated from the Armavir Military Aviation School of Air Defense Pilots. As one of the best graduates, he remained at the school as a pilot instructor, and since 1960, a senior pilot instructor. In 1967, he graduated from the Gagarin Air Force Academy.

Since 1967, he was the deputy commander and navigator of the squadron, and since 1968, he was the squadron commander. From 1970 he served as deputy commander for flight training, and from February 1971 he served as commander of the air defense fighter aviation regiment. He served in Siberia and the Russian Far East for many years. From July 1973 he served as deputy commander, and from January 1975 he served as commander of the air defense fighter aviation division. From January 1978 to January 1979 he served as first deputy commander of the 11th Separate Air Defense Army.

In 1981 he graduated from the Voroshilov Military Academy of the General Staff. In 1981-1983 — first deputy commander, and from August 1983 he served as commander of the 8th Separate Air Defense Army and deputy commander of the Kiev Military District for air defense. From August 1989 he served as commander of the Moscow Air Defence District.

From August 31, 1991 he served as Commander-in-Chief of the Air Defense Forces and Deputy Minister of Defense of the USSR, from February 1992 he served as Commander-in-Chief of the Air Defense Forces of the United Armed Forces of the Commonwealth of Independent States, from August 1992 to December 1997 he served as Commander-in-Chief of the Air Defense Forces of the Russian Federation and simultaneously as Chairman of the Coordinating Committee of the Member States of the Commonwealth of Independent States on Air Defense Issues. In connection with the unification of the Air Force and the Air Defense Forces of the Russian Federation into a single branch of the armed forces — the Air Force of the Russian Federation, on December 18, 1997 as part of the ongoing military reform, he was relieved of the post of Commander-in-Chief. Thus, he became the last Commander-in-Chief of the Air Defense Forces of the Russian Federation. For some time he was at the disposal of the Minister of Defense of the Russian Federation. Since December 1997 he served as Chief of Staff for the Coordination of Military Cooperation of the Member States of the Commonwealth of Independent States.

The military ranks of lieutenant colonel and colonel were awarded early. In February 1989, he was awarded the rank of colonel general. The military rank of army general was awarded by the decree of the President of Russia Boris Yeltsin dated June 13, 1996. In June 2001, he was discharged into the reserve upon reaching the maximum age for military service. In February 2004, he was dismissed into retirement. In 1990-1991, he was a member of the Central Committee of the Communist Party of the Soviet Union. He was married, two sons (the elder is a pilot in civil aviation, the younger died in a car accident). He lived in Moscow. He died on January 3, 2015 after a long illness and was buried on January 6 at the Federal Military Memorial Cemetery.

== Awards ==
- Order of Military Merit (1996);
- Order of the Red Banner;
- Order of the Red Star;
- Order "For Service to the Homeland in the Armed Forces of the USSR" 3rd class;
- Jubilee Medal "In Commemoration of the 100th Anniversary of the Birth of Vladimir Ilyich Lenin" (1970);
- Honorary title Honoured Military Pilot of the Russian Federation (1995);
- Prize of the Government of Russia for significant contribution to the development of the Air Force (December 17, 2012) - for organizing and managing the construction and development of the Air Force in the relevant command positions';
- Certificate of the Commonwealth of Independent States (June 1, 2001) - for active work to strengthen and develop the Commonwealth of Independent States.
