= Proposed no-fly zone in the Russian invasion of Ukraine =

In March 2022, following the February 2022 full-scale Russian invasion of Ukraine, NATO rejected Ukrainian requests for it to institute a no-fly zone over Ukraine. Of the thirty NATO members just three, the Baltic states, have voiced support for it.

A no-fly zone is a form of demilitarized zone in which a military power establishes an area over which certain aircraft are not permitted to fly. No-fly zones can include preemptive attacks to prevent potential violations, reactive force targeted at violating aircraft, or surveillance with no use of force.

== History ==
On 28 February 2022, Ukrainian President Volodymyr Zelenskyy called on NATO to establish a no-fly zone over Ukraine, saying that "if the West does this, Ukraine will defeat the aggressor with much less blood." Later that day, American White House Press Secretary Jen Psaki stated that American troops would not establish a no-fly zone over Ukraine, stating that "it would essentially mean the US military would be shooting down planes, Russian planes," which she described as "definitely escalatory, that would potentially put us in a place where we are in a military conflict with Russia."

On 3 March, Zelenskyy renewed his calls for a no-fly zone, stating that "if you cannot shut the sky now, then give us the timeline when you will do it? If you now cannot provide the timeline, tell us how many people have to die? Tell me how many. I'll go to count and wait for this moment. I hope the sky will be shut down. If you don't have strength and courage to do that, then give me the planes. Wouldn't that be fair?"

On 4 March, NATO announced that it would not be instituting a no-fly zone, with Secretary General Jens Stoltenberg stating that NATO had a responsibility "to prevent this war from escalating beyond Ukraine." In response, Zelenskyy stated that values of "security guarantees and promises, determination of alliances" seemed dead to NATO.

On 5 March, Russian President Vladimir Putin stated that any movement towards a no-fly zone "will be considered by us as participation of the respective country in an armed conflict."

On 14 March, the Estonian Parliament voted in favour of a resolution for NATO and UN to take immediate steps to establish a no-fly zone in Ukraine, the first parliament of a NATO member to do so. Three days later, the Latvian Parliament and the Lithuanian Parliament followed suit.

On 18 March, the Russian-backed separatist government of the Donetsk People's Republic claimed that Russia would establish a no-fly zone over the Donbas region of Ukraine.

== Debates ==
=== Support ===
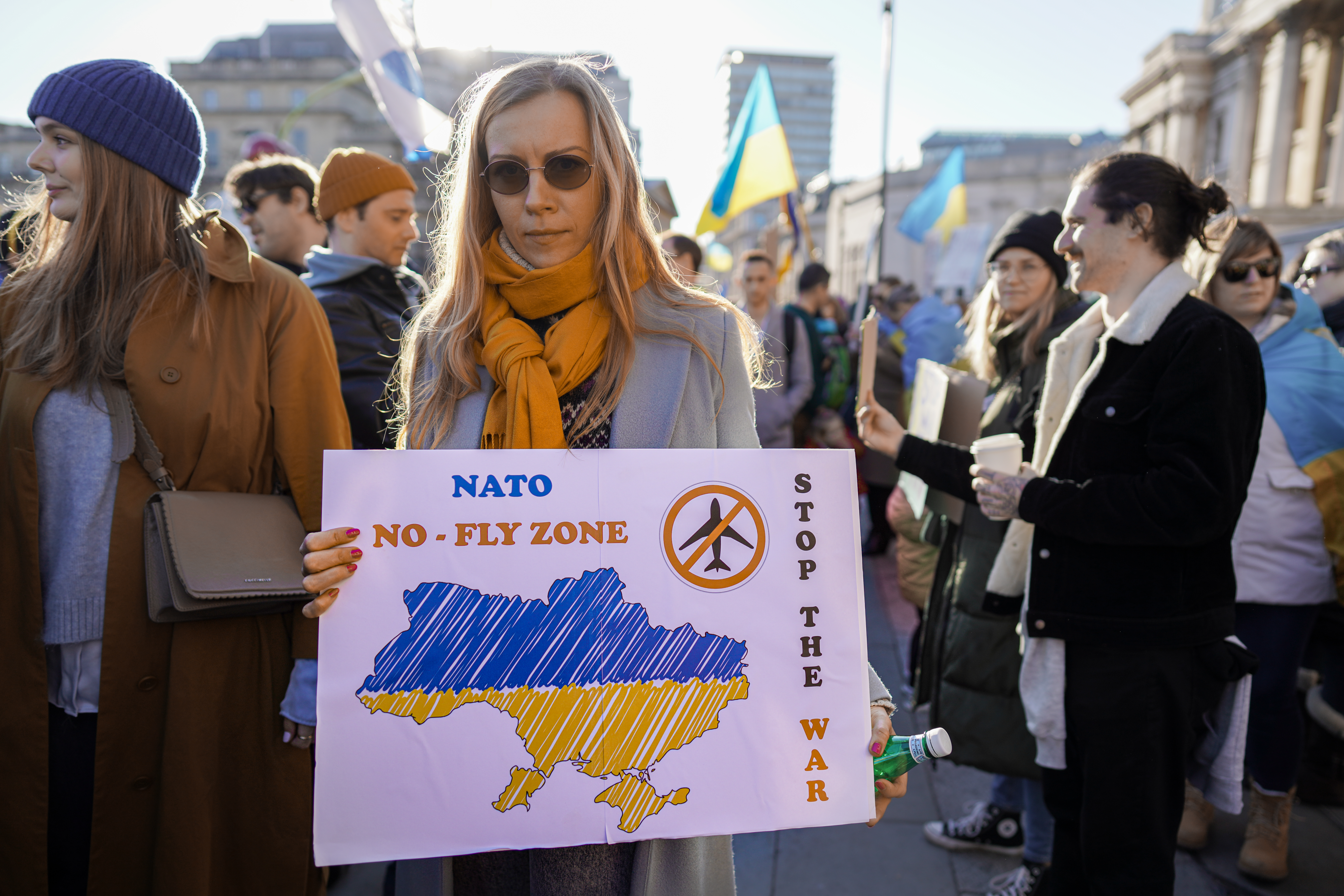
A protester holds up a sign in support of the no-fly zone.

Daria Kaleniuk, founder of the Ukrainian Anti-Corruption Action Center, confronted British Prime Minister Boris Johnson at a press conference in Warsaw, saying that "Ukrainian people are desperately asking for the West to protect our sky... You are saying in response it will trigger World War Three, but what is the alternative? To observe how our children – instead of planes – are protecting NATO from the missiles and bombs?" Former Ukrainian Minister of Defence Anatoliy Hrytsenko argued that a no-fly zone was needed to "stop Russia from launching devastating missile strikes, dropping bombs or undertaking large-scale air-assault operations using helicopters and aeroplanes."

The Guardian columnist Simon Tisdall argued that NATO forces should "declare their intention to impose a no-fly zone," stating that "the paradox is that the more successful and long-lived Ukraine's resistance is, the bigger the dangers for Nato [sic]. Yet if by supporting it, the allies cannot ultimately avoid being drawn into conflict with Russia, why delay the inevitable?" Sophy Antrobus of King's College London argued that a no-fly zone would "probably not" have the intended effects, but argued against ruling one out, stating that doing so risked creating an "escalation paradox", where "if any action from the west that isn't solely reactive to Russia's activities is ruled out, then we are destined to remain reactive in perpetuity."

Tobias Ellwood, chair of the British Defence Select Committee, argued that NATO should have "more confidence in managing these cold war high-stakes scenarios" and stated that it would be "misleading, simplistic and indeed defeatist to suggest engaging in a no-fly zone over Ukraine would automatically lead to a war." American politician Adam Kinzinger argued that "I fear if this continues, we will have to intervene in a bigger way," while Joe Manchin argued that "to take anything off the table, thinking we might not be able to use things because we've already taken it off the table, is wrong." Florida Congresswoman María Elvira Salazar told The Grayzone that she supported a no-fly zone, though she admitted she didn't know what it meant.

Rick Hillier, former Canadian Chief of the Defence Staff, argued that "I know that NATO is a defensive organization but you don't start defence at your front door," and argued that if a no-fly zone had been imposed prior to the invasion "Putin might have had second thoughts before he launched." Former American Ambassador to NATO Kurt Volker called for a limited no-fly zone to established over certain areas of Ukraine "to create a clear space where there are no attacks against civilians to allow humanitarian assistance to flow and civilians to leave safely." Joshua D. Zimmerman, professor of history at Yeshiva University in New York, published two articles in support of the no-fly zone over Ukraine using historical examples in Politico and The Daily Beast.

=== Opposition ===
A number of commentators, have argued against the idea of establishing a no-fly zone. A poll by the College of William & Mary Global Research Institute conducted between 10 and 14 March found that only 7% of American international relations researchers supported the establishment of a no-fly zone.

Jane Boulden of the Royal Military College of Canada stated that there was "zero question that to engage in some kind of no-fly zone over Ukraine is to effectively enter into a war with Russia." Howard Stoffer of the University of New Haven argued that "if someone's in the no-fly zone, you can't just chase them out, you have to shoot them down", further asking if "we really have the national commitment to go to war with Russia, and I don't think we do."

American social critic Noam Chomsky described calls for a no-fly zone as "understandable", but argued that implementing one would be "madness. A no-fly zone means that the U.S. Air Force would not only be attacking Russian planes but would also be bombing Russian ground installations that provide anti-aircraft support for Russian forces, with whatever "collateral damage" ensues. Is it really difficult to comprehend what follows?" Joshua Pollack of the Middlebury Institute of International Studies argued that "in all likelihood, NATO's conventional superiority would soon present Putin with a stark choice: Either accept a humiliating defeat or unleash some version of the nuclear option that he is already brandishing," and that "if we are to safeguard the values of free societies, those societies must continue to exist."

Canadian Ambassador to the U.N. Bob Rae argued that a no-fly zone would be "a wonderful thing if it happens, but it requires a degree of consensus that simply doesn't exist in this situation," adding that it was "important to remember that the successful no-fly zones have been carried out successfully because no one challenged the power of the country that was providing the air cover." Christopher Michael Faulkner and Andrew Stigler of the Naval War College have argued that Russia "is a vastly different target than that of any prior airspace ban in the past 30 years," saying that it would be the first nuclear power to be subjected to a no-fly zone, and that it would present a "severe risk for escalating the war", while adding that there was also a risk of tactical mistakes being made during enforcement of a no-fly zone, such as a repeat of the 1994 Black Hawk shootdown incident.

=== Other analysis ===
Christoph Bluth of the University of Bradford stated that "a no-fly zone does not mean that no aircraft are permitted to fly, because it is enforced by aircraft that constantly patrol the skies," since aircraft designated friendly under identification friend or foe systems could be spared, but that "nuclear deterrence is working – it is deterring NATO, as western leaders are unsure about the rationality of Russia's leadership," adding that "it is important to be clear that a no-fly zone over Ukraine is a different proposition compared with other conflicts, such as those in Iraq and Syria."

== Statements from government officials ==
- Canada – Prime Minister Justin Trudeau told Zelenskyy that Canada would not support a no-fly zone in a phone call on 10 March, citing the risk of escalation, but calling the decision "heartbreaking".
- Estonia – Minister of Defence Kalle Laanet said that he personally supports closing the airspace over Ukraine, while Estonia's final position will be whatever the NATO 30 decide.
- Lithuania – President Gitanas Nausėda urged caution, stating that a no-fly zone was "a good declaration, but how to implement this declaration practically? If Russian planes violate this no-fly zone, what will be the instructions on the ground?"
- Slovenia – Prime Minister Janez Janša wrote on Twitter: "Introduce a no-fly zone over Ukraine. Respect Obligations from Budapest Memorandum 1994."
- United States – Secretary of State Antony Blinken stated that "we're not going to put the United States in direct conflict with Russia" and that the American government was trying to "end this war in Ukraine, not start a larger one."

== Opinion polls ==
- A Reuters/Ipsos poll conducted on 4 March found that 74% of Americans would be in favour of establishing a no-fly zone over Ukraine.
- A YouGov poll from 4 March found that 28% of Britons supported establishing a no-fly zone, with 39% opposed and 33% unsure;
- A YouGov America poll from 9 March found that 40% of Americans supported enforcing a no-fly zone with 30% against and 30% undecided. However, the same poll found that only 30% of Americans would support the American military shooting down Russian planes over Ukraine, with 46% opposed and 24% unsure;
- A Quinnipiac University poll from 16 March found that only 32% of Americans disagreed with NATO's decision not to impose a no-fly zone, whereas 54% agreed with the decision;

== See also ==
- Aerial warfare in the Russian invasion of Ukraine
