= Mikhail Khodaryonok =

Russian colonel and military pundit

Mikhail Mikhailovich Khodaryonok
- Native name: Михаил Михайлович Ходарёнок
- Born: 20 February 1954 (age 72)
- Allegiance: Soviet Union; Russia
- Branch: Soviet Air Defence Forces
- Service years: 1971–2000
- Rank: Colonel
- Commands: 1st Group, 1st Direction, Main Operational Directorate, General Staff of the Armed Forces of the Russian Federation
- Awards: Medal of the Order "For Merit to the Fatherland"; Medal "In Commemoration of the 850th Anniversary of Moscow"; Jubilee Medal "60 Years of the Armed Forces of the USSR"; Jubilee Medal "70 Years of the Armed Forces of the USSR"; Medal "For Impeccable Service" 1st Class; Medal "For Impeccable Service" 2nd Class; Medal "For Impeccable Service" 3rd Class
- Alma mater: Military Academy of the General Staff of the Armed Forces of Russia; Minsk Higher Military Engineering School

Mikhail Mikhailovich Khodaryonok (Russian: Михаи́л Миха́йлович Ходарёнок, born 20 February 1954) is a Russian journalist, military observer for Gazeta.Ru and Vesti FM, and a Reserve Colonel of the Russian Federation.

== Military service ==
He entered the Minsk Higher Military Engineering School (known at the time as the "Minsk Higher Engineering Anti-Aircraft Missile School of Air Defense") in 1971, where he graduated in 1976. He commenced service in the Soviet Air Defence Forces as the head of the combat control department of the Radio-Technical Troops for the S-75 Dvina, and then from 1977 to 1980, served as the commander of the Radio-Technical Troops for the S-75. In 1980 he was appointed commander of the S-75 anti-aircraft missile division.

In 1986 he graduated from the Zhukov Air and Space Defence Academy. From 1986 to 1988, he served as deputy commander of the S-200 anti-aircraft missile regiment. In 1988, he was transferred to serve in the main headquarters of the Soviet Air Defence Forces as a senior officer.

Since 1992, he has been a senior officer-operator of the 1st Direction of the 1st Department within the Main Operational Directorate of the General Staff of the Armed Forces of the Russian Federation. In 1996 he entered the Military Academy of the General Staff of the Armed Forces of Russia, after which in 1998 he was appointed the chief of the 1st Group of the 1st Direction within the Main Operational Directorate. On 22 July 2000 he retired to the reserve with the rank of colonel.

== Work in journalism ==
After finishing military service, he commenced work as a military journalist, writing as a columnist for Nezavisimoye Voyennoye Obozreniye between 2000 and 2003. He was the editor-in-chief for the newspaper Military Industrial Courier and the Aerospace Defence (Russian: Boздушнo-кocмичecкaя oбopoнa) magazine.

He is a military observer for the publication Gazeta.Ru and the radio station Vesti FM, where he regularly appears on the program "From Three to Five" (Russian: От трёх до пяти) hosted by Yevgeny Satanovsky, within his dedicated segment titled "The Hour of the Militarist" (Russian: часом милитариста).

Khodaryonok's 2003 article "Worship of fisted tactics", which featured a negative assessment of operational documents of the Steppe Front written by Ivan Konev, was sharply criticised by the head and deputy head of the Department of War History of the Military Academy of the General Staff, Major General Anatoly Dmitrievich Borschchev (Russian: Анатолий Дмитриевич Борщёв) and Colonel Ivan Petrovich Makar (Russian: Иван Петрович Макар), who accused Khodaryonok of seeking out negative nitpickings and relying upon shortcomings to belittle the importance of Soviet military tactics as a key factor of the Soviet Union's victory in World War II, claiming that he was full of contradictions and "does not provide any evidence" of Konev's wrongdoings as he ridicules Konev and other Soviet commanders of the war.

He was awarded the Medal of the Order "For Merit to the Fatherland" on 21 August 2020 by decree of the President of the Russian Federation for "merits in the development of domestic journalism, high professionalism, and many years of fruitful work".

=== Opinions on Russian invasion of Ukraine ===
In February 2022, three weeks before the commencement of the Russian invasion of Ukraine, Nezavisimaya Gazeta published a piece written by Khodaryonok entitled "Forecasts of bloodthirsty political scientists: About enthusiastic hawks and hurried cuckoos" (Russian: Прогнозы кровожадных политологов: О восторженных ястребах и торопливых кукушках), where he explains that the Russian Armed Forces is unable to realistically inflict a crushing defeat against Ukraine within mere hours should military conflict occur, contrary to the assertions of various Russian politicians, as the Russian military would be unable to contend with Western supply of weapons and materiel to Ukraine, unable to inflict the high-precision strikes necessary to decapitate the Ukrainian government, and unable to fight a protracted war against underground Ukrainian partisans in urban combat. Khodaryonok writes: "the degree of hatred (which, as you know, is the most effective fuel for armed struggle) in the neighboring republic towards Moscow is frankly underestimated. No one will meet the Russian army with bread, salt and flowers in Ukraine". He also warned that those who hope for a quick victory "have no serious grounds".

Later in May 2022, while speaking on Russia-1, Khodaryonok reiterated the difficulty the Russian Armed Forces will encounter in dealing with an increasingly capable Ukrainian force being armed through Lend-Lease from Western countries, while also pointing out that it would be impossible for Russia to mobilise one million combatants without having the necessary equipment to do so, and that the common perception in Russia that the Ukrainian military lacks professional personnel is incorrect, as it is the training and morale of soldiers, not the circumstances in which they are recruited, that determines actual professionalism. Khodaryonok's remarks on Russia-1 were widely covered in western media, with The New York Times writing that his assessment was filled with candor, normally banished from state-run TV. He also warned against "information tranquilizers" about stories of the collapse of the Ukrainian armed forces as "none of this is close to reality". Two days later, appearing on the same television show, he made remarks which were notably divergent from his earlier tone, stating "there is every reason to believe that the implementation of our plans will give Ukraine an unpleasant surprise in the near future", and also implied that Western aid such as M777 howitzers would soon "be just memories", that Ukraine would never attain air supremacy, and that it would take Ukraine "decades" to build a navy to rival the Black Sea Fleet.
