= Aleksandr Chayko =

Russian general (born 1971)

- Александр Юрьевич Чайко
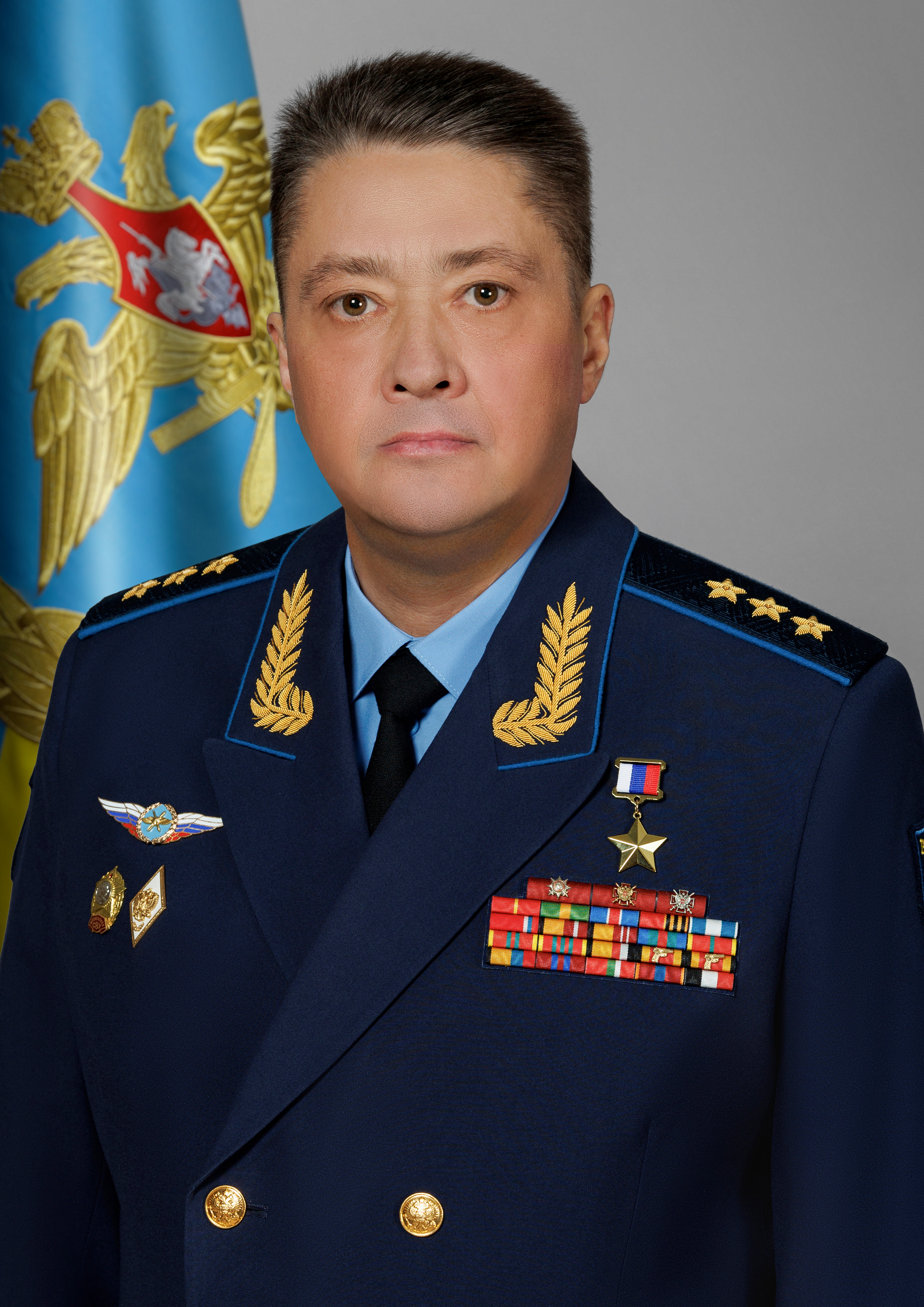
- Chayko in 2026
- Born: 27 July 1971 (age 55); Golitsyno, Moscow Oblast, Russian SFSR, Soviet Union
- Education: Moscow Higher Combined Arms Command School; Combined Arms Academy of the Armed Forces of the Russian Federation; Russian General Staff Academy
- Military career
- Allegiance: Russia
- Branch: Russian Ground Forces; Russian Aerospace Forces
- Service years: 1992–present
- Rank: Colonel General
- Commands: Commander-in-Chief of the Aerospace Forces; Eastern Military District; Group of Forces in the Syrian Arab Republic; 1st Guards Tank Army; 20th Guards Combined Arms Army; 2nd Guards Motor Rifle Division; 27th Separate Guards Motor Rifle Brigade
- Conflicts: Syrian civil war; Russian military intervention in Syria; Russo-Ukrainian war; 2022 Russian invasion of Ukraine
- Awards: Hero of the Russian Federation

Colonel General Aleksandr Yuryevich Chayko (Russian: Александр Юрьевич Чайко; born 27 July 1971) is a Russian military officer who has been Commander-in-Chief of the Russian Aerospace Forces since 2026. He was formerly the commander of the Eastern Military District from 2021 to 2022, and his other previous commands included the 1st Guards Tank Army and the 20th Guards Combined Arms Army. Chayko was awarded the title Hero of the Russian Federation in 2020.

He was commissioned in 1992, graduating from the Moscow Higher Combined Arms Command School. He went on to graduate from the Combined Arms Academy of the Armed Forces of the Russian Federation in 2001 and the General Staff Academy in 2012. At the start of the Russian military intervention in Syria in 2015, Chayko served as the chief of staff, being responsible for setting up base infrastructure and coordinating operations with Syrian allies. He commanded the Operational Group of Forces in the Syrian Arab Republic several times, including from 2019 to 2021, in 2022, and in 2024.

He is accused by the Ukrainian government of organizing massacres in Bucha and other towns around Kyiv during 2022 Russian invasion of Ukraine.

== Early life and education ==
Aleksandr Chayko was born on 27 July 1971 in Golitsyno, Moscow Oblast, Russian Soviet Federative Socialist Republic. In 1988, he graduated from the Moscow Suvorov Military School, and in 1992, he graduated from the Moscow Higher Combined Arms Command School.

== Military career ==
In the 1990s, Chayko served in the Western Group of Forces and the Moscow Military District. He also graduated from the Combined Arms Academy of the Armed Forces of the Russian Federation in 2001. From 2001 to 2006, he was the chief of staff of a motorized rifle regiment, commander of a motorized rifle regiment. He was promoted to a colonel ahead of schedule in 2004. From 2006 to 2007, he was the commander of the 27th Separate Guards Motor Rifle Brigade, and from November 2007 to May 2009, he was a commander of the 2nd Guards Motor Rifle Division. In October 2009, he was the head of the 473rd district educational center for training junior specialists. He graduated from the Russian General Staff Academy in 2012.

In June 2013, Chayko was the deputy army commander of the Central Military District. On 8 July 2014, by the Decree of the President of Russia, he was appointed commander of the 20th Guards Combined Arms Red Banner Army. After the reconstruction of the 1st Guards Tank Army in 2014, he became its commander until April 2017.

In 2015, Chayko was the first chief of staff of the Grouping of Forces of the Russian Armed Forces Syria. He was promoted to a lieutenant general by Decree of the President of Russia No. 665 dated 12 December 2016. From April 2017 to November 2018, Chayko was the Chief of Staff - the First Deputy Commander of the Eastern Military District.

From November 2018 to February 2019, he was the Deputy Chief of the Military Academy of the General Staff of the Armed Forces of Russia.

In February 2019, he became the Deputy Chief of the General Staff of the Armed Forces of Russia.

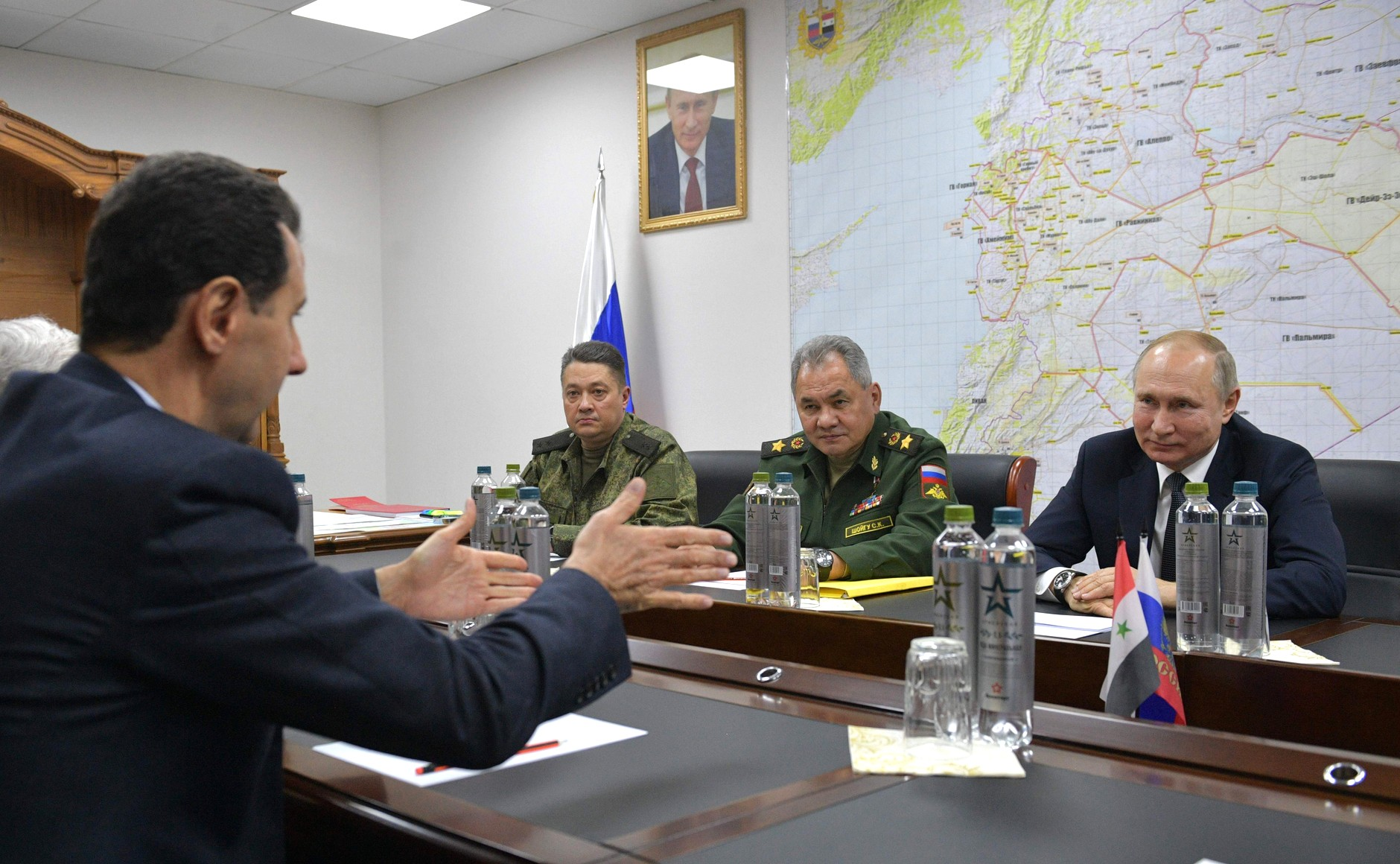
Chayko with Russian Defense Minister Sergei Shoigu, Russian President Vladimir Putin and Syrian President Bashar al-Assad on 7 January 2020

From September 2019 to November 2020 and from February 2021 to June 2021, he was the Commander of the Group of Forces of the Armed Forces of Russia in Syria. By the Decree of the President of Russia, No. 355, on 11 June 2021, Chayko was promoted colonel general. His accomplishments in his previous posts were praised by President Vladimir Putin.

On 12 November 2021, Chayko became the commander of the Eastern Military District. On 16 November, he officially took office, accepting the standard of the commander of the troops. During the 2022 Russian invasion of Ukraine, he led the forces from the district in the northern Ukraine campaign. On 24 March 2022, he visited the front line, about 30 kilometers away from Kyiv, shortly before the withdrawal on 29 March. In July 2022, an Eastern Group of Forces in Ukraine was established under the command of Rustam Muradov, and in October 2022 he was replaced as commander of the Eastern Military District by Muradov. On 7 August 2022, the United Kingdom Ministry of Defense reported that Chayko was removed from his post.

Chayko returned to Syria as commander of Russian forces there from September to December 2022, and again in November 2024 after the start of the 2024 Syrian opposition offensives. In June 2025 he became a Deputy Chief of the General Staff. On 4 May 2026, he was appointed the Commander-in-Chief of the Russian Aerospace Forces, replacing Viktor Afzalov, despite not having spent his career in the branch.

=== War crime allegations ===
Chayko earned a global reputation as a brutal leader in Syria in 2019 and 2020. Human Rights Watch states that he may be responsible for widespread attacks against hospitals, schools and populated areas in the Idlib Governorate. The attacks killed 1600 civilians and displaced 1.4 million.

It has been further alleged that during the 2022 Russian invasion of Ukraine, troops under Chayko's command tortured and executed hundreds of Ukrainian civilians during the Kyiv offensive. In 2022, war crimes prosecutors in Ukraine began researching whether Chayko directly ordered specific atrocities.

== Attempted assassination ==
On 1 August 2026, 5 people died and 19 were injured after a bombing at a high-end Italian restaurant where Chayko was reportedly celebrating his 55th birthday. A woman attempted to enter the birthday with a parcel bomb but was stopped by a security guard. The bomb exploded on the restaurant's veranda before she could enter the restaurant, killing her, the security guard, and an unnamed banqueter who was outdoors at the time. The Russian Ministry of Internal Affairs confirmed the bombing, but did not name victims. It is reported that Chayko survived with the aid of a bodyguard named Anatoly S. His 25-year-old daughter Maria was hit by shrapnel and suffered a traumatic brain injury while her husband, Daniil Peredriy, died in hospital. Chayko's niece and dancer at the party, Yevdokia Kirilova, was wounded along with Chayko's father-in-law Aleksandr Peredriy. Kirilova's daughter-in-law Yulia died in hospital after suffering severe injuries to her chest and abdomen. Chayko's colleague Major General Valery Plokhotnyuk died on the day of the explosion.

== See also ==
- List of Heroes of the Russian Federation
