= Golitsyno =

Golitsyno (Russian: Голицыно) is the name of several inhabited localities in Russia.

== Modern localities ==
Urban localities

- Golitsyno, Moscow Oblast, a town in Odintsovsky District of Moscow Oblast

Rural localities

- Golitsyno, Kolyshleysky District, Penza Oblast, a village in Pleshcheyevsky Selsoviet of Kolyshleysky District in Penza Oblast
- Golitsyno, Nizhnelomovsky District, Penza Oblast, a selo in Golitsynsky Selsoviet of Nizhnelomovsky District in Penza Oblast
- Golitsyno, Rtishchevsky District, Saratov Oblast, a selo in Rtishchevsky District of Saratov Oblast
- Golitsyno, Samoylovsky District, Saratov Oblast, a selo in Samoylovsky District of Saratov Oblast
- Golitsyno, Tambov Oblast, a selo in Yurlovsky Selsoviet of Nikiforovsky District in Tambov Oblast

== Alternative names ==
- Golitsyno, alternative name of Galitsyno, a selo in Moldovsky Rural Okrug under the administrative jurisdiction of Adlersky City District under the administrative jurisdiction of the City of Sochi in Krasnodar Krai; 43°33′N 39°59′E

== See also ==
- Gallitzin, Pennsylvania
- Gallitzin Township, Cambria County, Pennsylvania
