= Russian Aerospace Forces =

Air and space forces of the Russian Armed Forces

- Воздушно-космические силы
- Middle emblem of the Russian Aerospace Forces
- Founded: 1 August 2015; 11 years ago
- Country: Russia
- Branch: Russian Air Force; Russian Space Forces; Air and Missile Defense Forces
- Type: Air and space force
- Role: Aerial warfare; Space warfare; Missile defense
- Size: 165,000 personnel (2020)
- Part of: Russian Armed Forces
- Headquarters: Arbat District, Moscow
- Colors: Light Blue; Dark Blue; Gold; Silver
- March: "Air March" (Russian: "Авиамарш") (official march-past of the Air Force) "14 Minutes Until Launch" (Russian: "14 минут до старта") (official march of the Space Forces)
- Anniversaries: Air Force Day (12 August)
- Engagements: Intervention in the Syrian Civil War; Russo-Ukrainian War
- Website: eng.mil.ru/forces/aerospace

Commanders
- Supreme Commander-in-Chief: President Vladimir Putin
- Minister of Defense: Andrey Belousov
- Commander-in-Chief: Colonel General Aleksandr Chayko
- Chief of the Main Staff: Lieutenant General Aleksandr Maksimtsev

Insignia
- Flag

- Roundel

- Patch

- Great emblem

- Insignia

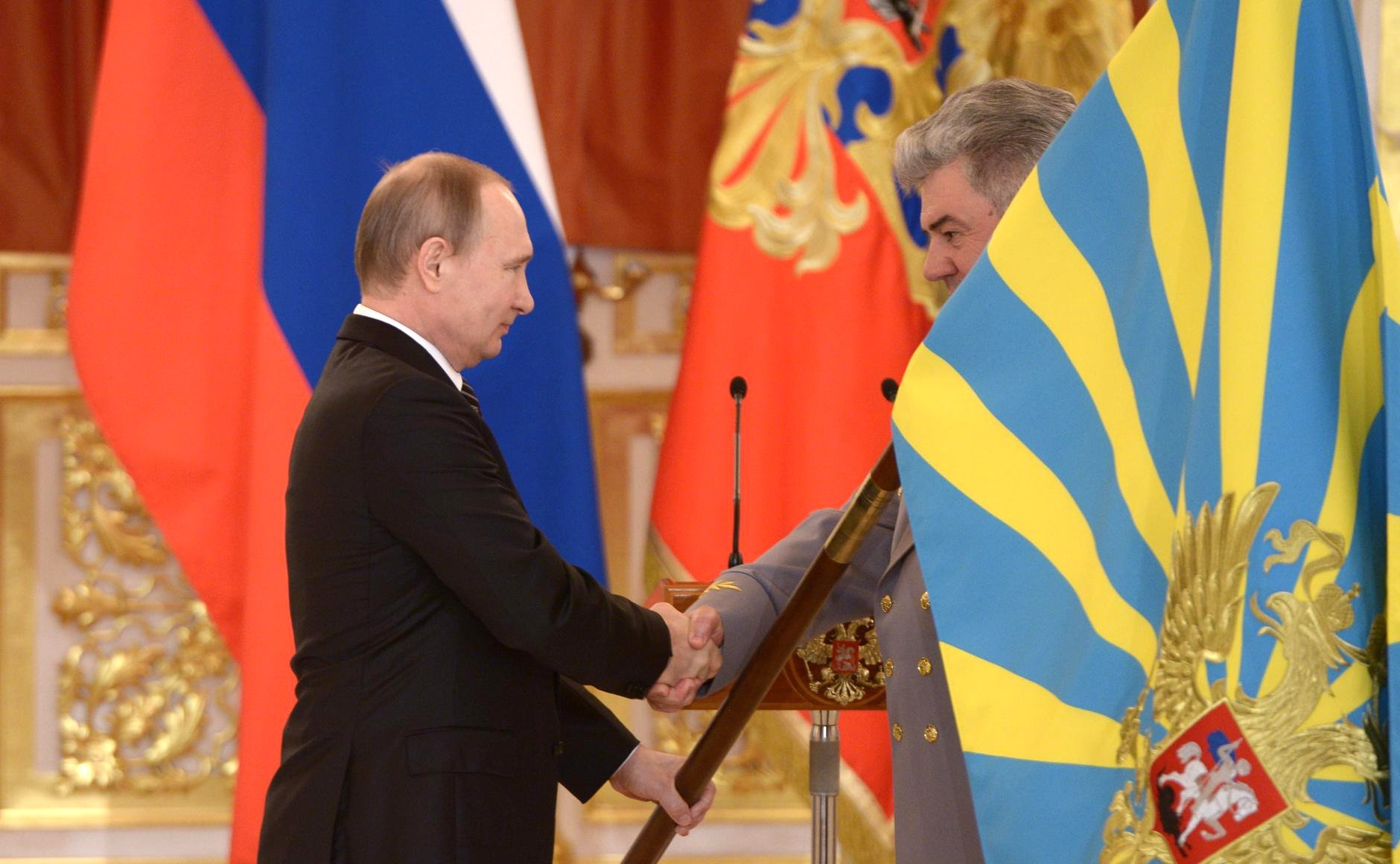
President Putin presenting the banner of the Aerospace Forces to Viktor Bondarev

The Russian Aerospace Forces (Note: Russian: Воздушно-космические силы, romanized: Vozdushno-kosmicheskiye sily) or Russian Air and Space Forces (VKS) comprise the aerial, space warfare, and missile defence branches of the Russian Armed Forces. It was established on 1 August 2015 with the merging of the Russian Air Force (VVS) and the Russian Aerospace Defence Forces (VVKO), as recommended by the Ministry of Defence to improve efficiency and logistical support. The VKS is headquartered in Moscow.

== Organisation ==
=== Branches ===
With the merging of the Russian Air Force and the Russian Aerospace Defense Forces, the Russian Aerospace Forces is a unified command consisting of the following branches:

- Air Force
- Space Forces
- Air and Missile Defense Forces

Main Command of the Aerospace Forces (Главное командование Воздушно-космическими силами)
Command Staff
Commander-in-Chief Aerospace Forces (Главнокомандующий Воздушно-космическими силами)		Army general / Colonel general
Chief of the Main Staff - First Deputy Commander-in-Chief of the Aerospace Forces (Начальник Главного штаба — первый заместитель Главнокомандующего Воздушно-космическими силами)		Colonel general / Lieutenant general
Deputy Commander-in-Chief Aerospace Forces (Заместитель Главнокомандующего Воздушно-космическими силами)		Colonel general / Lieutenant general
Chiefs of branches, deputy commanders:
Commander of the Air Force, Deputy Commander-in-Chief of Aerospace Forces (Командующий Военно-воздушными силами — заместитель Главнокомандующего Воздушно-космическими силами) Colonel general / Lieutenant general	Commander of the Aerospace and Missile Defense Forces, Deputy Commander-in-Chief of Aerospace Forces (Командующий Войсками противовоздушной и противоракетной обороны — заместитель Главнокомандующего Воздушно-космическими силами) Colonel general / Lieutenant general	Commander of the Space Forces, Deputy Commander-in-Chief Aerospace Forces (Командующий Космическими войсками — заместитель Главнокомандующего Воздушно-космическими силами) Colonel general / Lieutenant general
Functional deputy commanders:
Deputy Commander-in-Chief of Aerospace Forces for Military-Political Work (Заместитель Главнокомандующего Воздушно-космическими силами по военно-политической работе) Major general	Deputy Commander-in-Chief of Aerospace Forces for Logistics (Заместитель Главнокомандующего Воздушно-космическими силами по материально-техническому обеспечению) Major general	Deputy Commander-in-Chief of Aerospace Forces for Armaments (Заместитель Главнокомандующего Воздушно-космическими силами по вооружению) Major general

== Ranks and rank insignia ==
Officer ranks

Rank group	General / flag officers				Senior officers			Junior officers
Russian Aerospace Forces
Russian Aerospace Forces	Генера́л а́рмии Generál ármii	Генера́л-полко́вник; Generál-polkóvnik	Генера́л-лейтена́нт; Generál-leytenánt	Генера́л-майо́р; Generál-mayór	Полко́вник; Polkóvnik	Подполко́вник; Podpolkóvnik	Майо́р; Majór	Kапита́н; Kapitán	Старший лейтена́нт Stárshiy leytenánt	Лейтенант; Leytenant	Mла́дший лейтена́нт Mládshiy leytenánt

Other ranks

Rank group	Under-officers		NCOs				Enlisted
Russian Aerospace Forces
Russian Aerospace Forces	Ста́рший пра́порщик Stárshiy práporshchik	Пра́порщик; Práporshchyk	Старшина́ Starshyná	Ста́рший сержа́нт Stárshiy serzhánt	Сержа́нт; Serzhánt	Мла́дший сержа́нт Mládshiy serzhánt	Ефре́йтор; Efréĭtor	Рядово́й; Ryadovóy

== See also ==
- Russian Naval Aviation
- Strategic Missile Forces
- United States Department of the Air Force
  - United States Air Force
  - United States Space Force
- List of Russian military bases
