= Eusebian Canons =

System of dividing the Gospels used in the Middle Ages

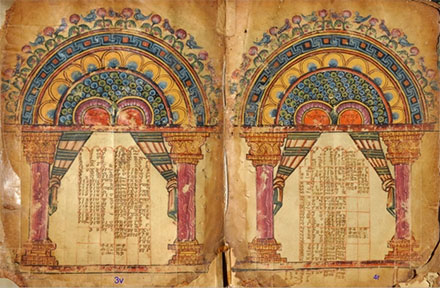
Canon tables from the Garima Gospels, Ethiopic gospel manuscripts of the sixth century; showing original Late Antique arcaded forms subsequently perpetuated in Byzantine and Romanesque manuscripts

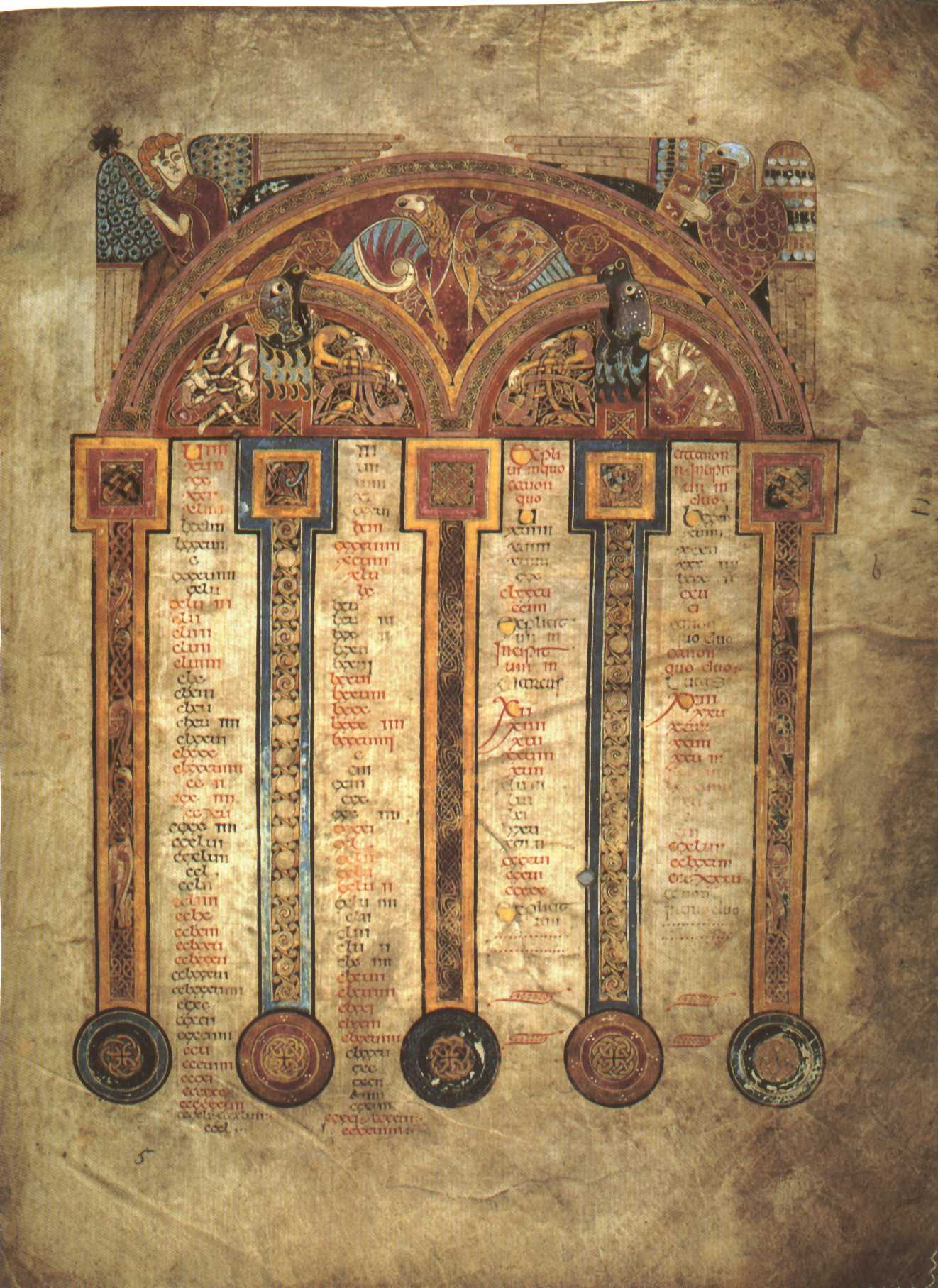
Canon table from the Book of Kells; the tables in the book were effectively unusable, as they were over-condensed and the corresponding sections were not marked in the main text. This is either because it is unfinished, or because it was a display book not meant for study.

Eusebian canons, Eusebian sections or Eusebian apparatus, also known as Ammonian sections, are the system of dividing the four Gospels used between late antiquity and the Middle Ages. The divisions into chapters and verses used in modern texts date only from the 13th and 16th centuries, respectively. The sections are indicated in the margin of nearly all Greek and Latin manuscripts of the Bible, but can be also found in peripheral Bible transmissions as Syriac and Christian Palestinian Aramaic (Codex Sinaiticus Rescriptus) from the 5th to 8th centuries, and in Ethiopian manuscripts until the 14th and 15th centuries, with a few produced as late as the 17th century. These are usually summarized in canon tables at the start of the Gospels. There are about 1165 sections: 355 for Matthew, 235 for Mark, 343 for Luke, and 232 for John; the numbers, however, vary slightly in different manuscripts.

The canon tables were made to create a sense of divinity within the reader’s soul, to understand and reflect upon the various colors and patterns to achieve a higher connection with God.

== Authorship ==
Until the 19th century it was mostly believed that these divisions were devised by Ammonius of Alexandria, at the beginning of the 3rd century (c. 220), in connection with a Harmony of the Gospels, now lost, which he composed. It was traditionally believed that he divided the four Gospels into small numbered sections, which were similar in content where the narratives are parallel. He then wrote the sections of the three last Gospels, or simply the section numbers with the name of the respective evangelist, in parallel columns opposite the corresponding sections of the Gospel of Matthew, which he had chosen as the basis of his gospel harmony. It is now believed that the work of Ammonius was restricted to what Eusebius of Caesarea (265–340) states concerning it in his letter to Carpianus, namely, that he placed the parallel passages of the last three Gospels alongside the text of Matthew, and the sections traditionally credited to Ammonius are now ascribed to Eusebius, who was always credited with the final form of the tables.

== The Eusebian Tables ==
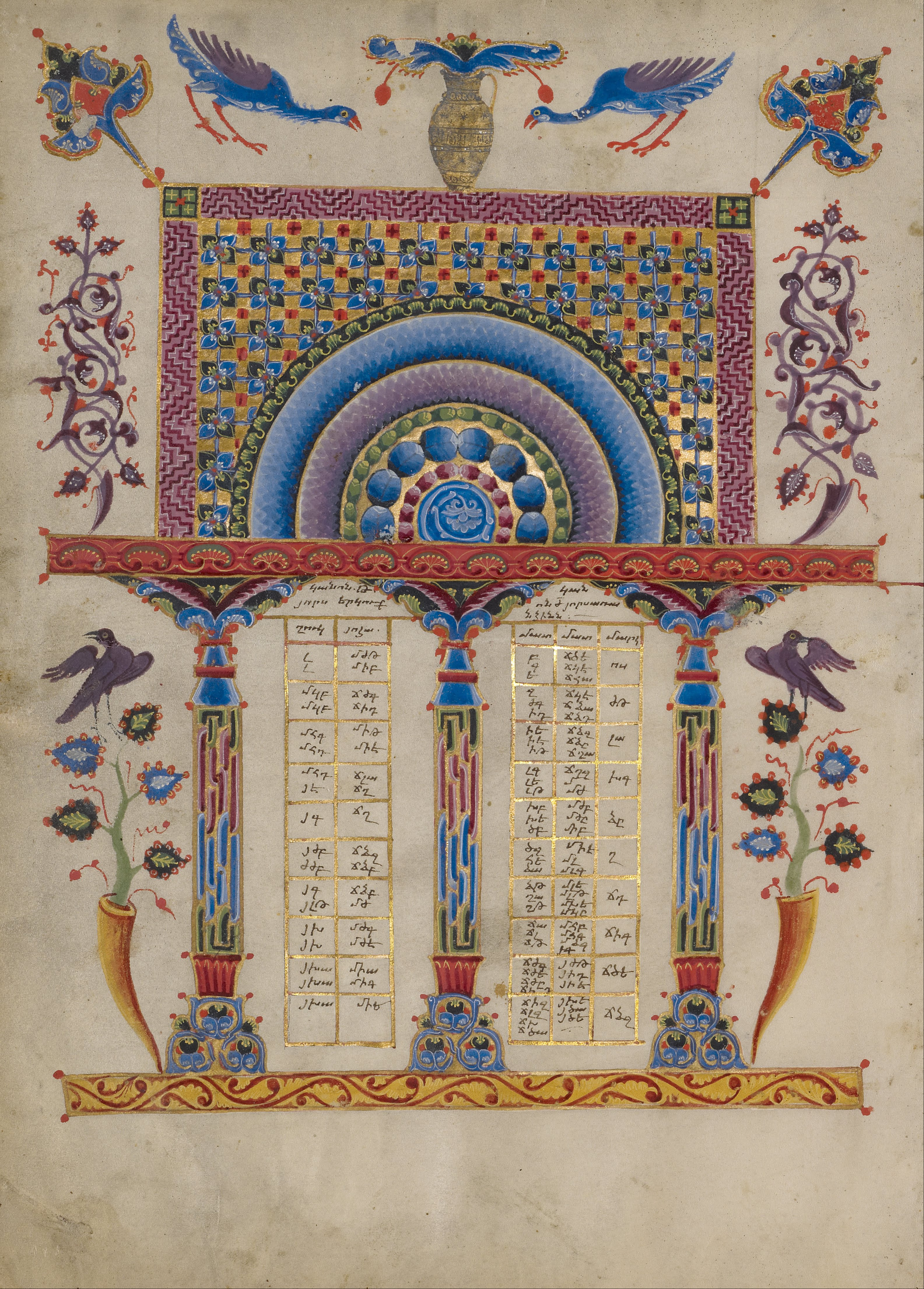
An Armenian illuminated manuscript of a canon table by Toros Roslin (active 1256 - 1268) entitled Canon Table Page.

Canon quartus in quo III from the Cutbercht Gospels (8th century, Salzburg)

The harmony of Ammonius suggested to Eusebius, as he says in his letter, the idea of drawing up ten tables (kanones) in which the sections in question were so classified as to show at a glance where each Gospel agreed with or differed from the others. In the first nine tables he placed in parallel columns the numbers of the sections common to the four, or three, or two, evangelists; namely: (1) Matt., Mark, Luke, John; (2) Matt., Mark, Luke; (3) Matt., Luke, John; (4) Matt., Mark, John; (5) Matt., Luke; (6) Matt., Mark; (7) Matt., John; (8) Luke, Mark; (9) Luke, John. In the tenth he noted successively the sections special to each evangelist. Sections "Mark, Luke, John" and "Mark, John" are absent because no text is common to Mark and John without a parallel in at least Matthew.

Table #	Matthew	Mark	Luke	John
	In Quo Quattor			
Canon I.	Yes	Yes	Yes	Yes
	In Quo Tres			
Canon II.	Yes	Yes	Yes	
Canon III.	Yes		Yes	Yes
Canon IV.	Yes	Yes		Yes
	In Quo Duo			
Canon V.	Yes		Yes	
Canon VI.	Yes	Yes		
Canon VII.	Yes			Yes
Canon VIII.		Yes	Yes	
Canon IX.			Yes	Yes
	In Quo Matth. Proprie			
Canon X	Yes			
	In Quo Marc. Proprie			
Canon X		Yes		
	In Quo Luc. Proprie			
Canon X			Yes	
	In Quo Ioh. Proprie			
Canon X				Yes

The usefulness of these tables for the purpose of reference and comparison soon brought them into common use, and from the 5th century the Ammonian sections, with references to the Eusebian tables, were indicated in the margin of the manuscripts. Opposite each section was written its number, and underneath this the number of the Eusebian table to be consulted in order to find the parallel texts or text; a reference to the tenth table would show that this section was proper to that evangelist. These marginal notes are reproduced in several editions of Tischendorf's New Testament.

Eusebius's explanatory letter to Carpianus was also very often reproduced before the tables.

== Illuminated canon tables ==
The tables themselves were usually placed at the start of a Gospel Book; in illuminated works they were placed in round-headed arcade-like frames, of which the general form remained remarkably consistent through to the Romanesque period. This form was derived from Late Antique book-painting frames like those in the Chronography of 354. In many examples the tables are the only decoration in the whole book, perhaps other than some initials. In particular, canon tables, with Evangelist portraits, are very important for the study of the development of manuscript painting in the earliest part of the Early Medieval period, where very few manuscripts survive, and even the most decorated of those have fewer pages illuminated than was the case later.

Academic works have established the relation between the architectural framework of Canon tables and the iconography of the Heavenly Jerusalem in Christian art.

== Images ==
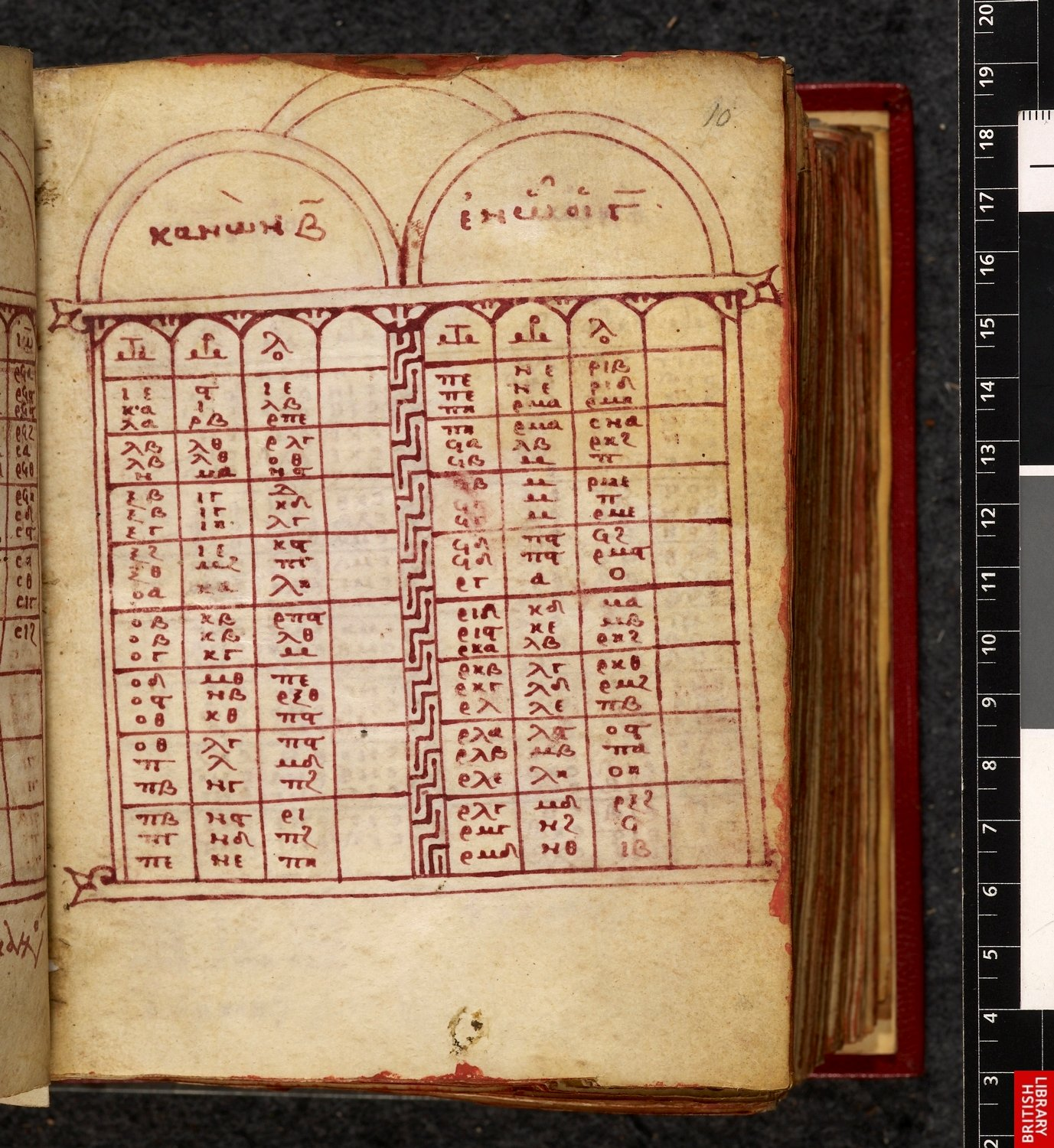
Eusebian tables before text of the Gospels in Codex Harleianus 5567 (Gregory-Aland 116; 12th century)

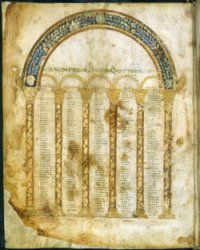
One of the canon tables from the 8th century Codex Beneventanus.

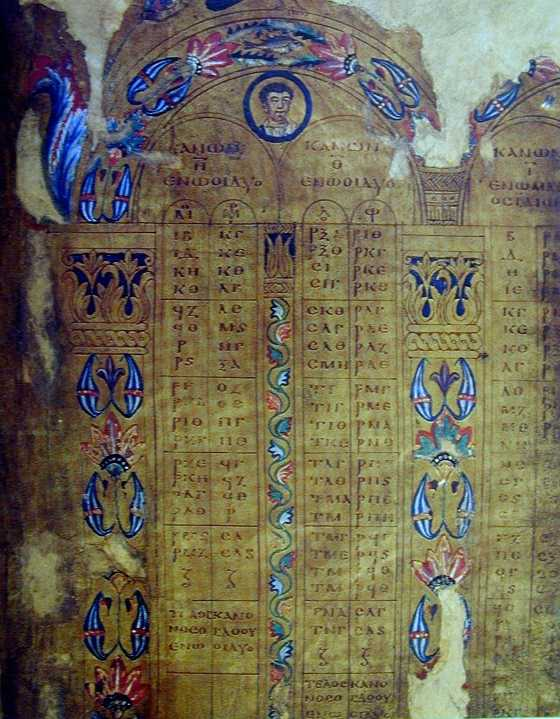
The London Canon Tables are two folios from a Byzantine manuscript of the 6th or 7th century, showing the typical arcaded frame.

== See also ==
- Chronicon (Eusebius)
- Diatessaron
