= Beckenschlägerschüssel =

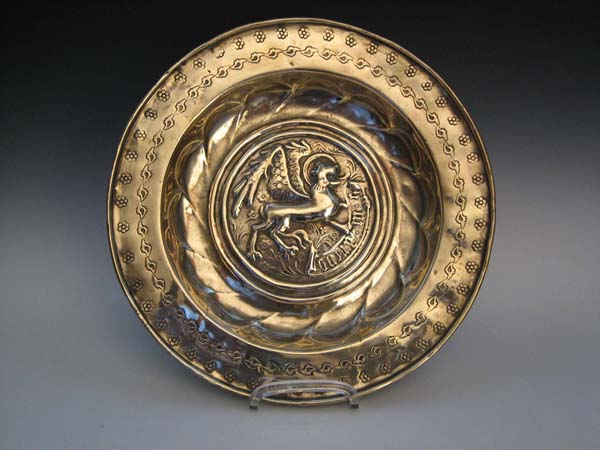
Beckenschlägerschüssel with an Evangelist portrait of the Lion of Mark

Beckenschlägerschüssel is a term used to refer to a specific group of brass bowls that emerged in the German-speaking world, in the late 15th to 16th centuries.
