= Khitrovo Gospels =

Russian illuminated manuscript

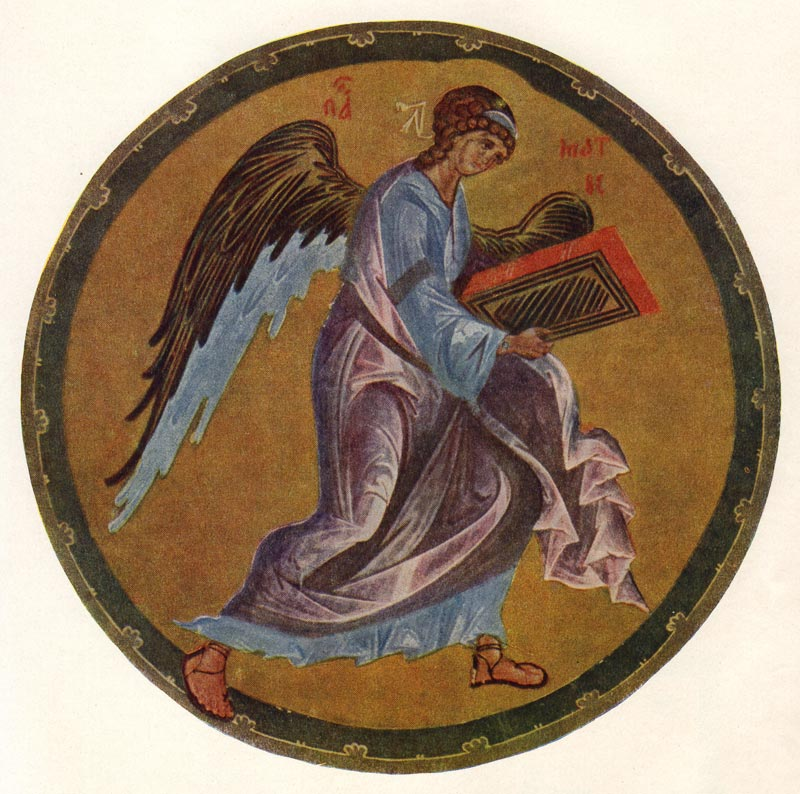
The Man of Matthew, a miniature attributed to Andrey Rublev.

The Khitrovo Gospels is a Russian illuminated Gospel Book from the late 14th or early 15th century. The book has numerous similarities to the Koshka Gospels, Kiev Psalter of 1397, and other East Slavic manuscripts of the 1390s.

It contains eight full page miniatures; four Evangelist portraits and four pictures of their symbols (the eagle, angel, lion, and bull), the latter the earliest known Russian full-page examples. The angel is attributed to Andrei Rublev, and is the only illumination usually attributed to him, although some art historians incline to attribute at least all the full-pages miniatures to him. All the initials are painted in colour and gold, and many pages are richly ornamented. The style is elegant with light colours and expressive faces.

The gospel takes its name from Bogdan Khitrovo, a powerful boyar who obtained the manuscript from Tsar Fyodor III. Khitrovo bequeathed the gospel to the Trinity Monastery near Moscow, where Andrey Rublev used to be a monk. After the nationalisation of the monastic library the Khitrovo Gospel was incorporated in the holdings of the Russian State Library in Moscow.
