= Cutbercht Gospels =

8th century illustrated gospel book

Portrait of Matthew

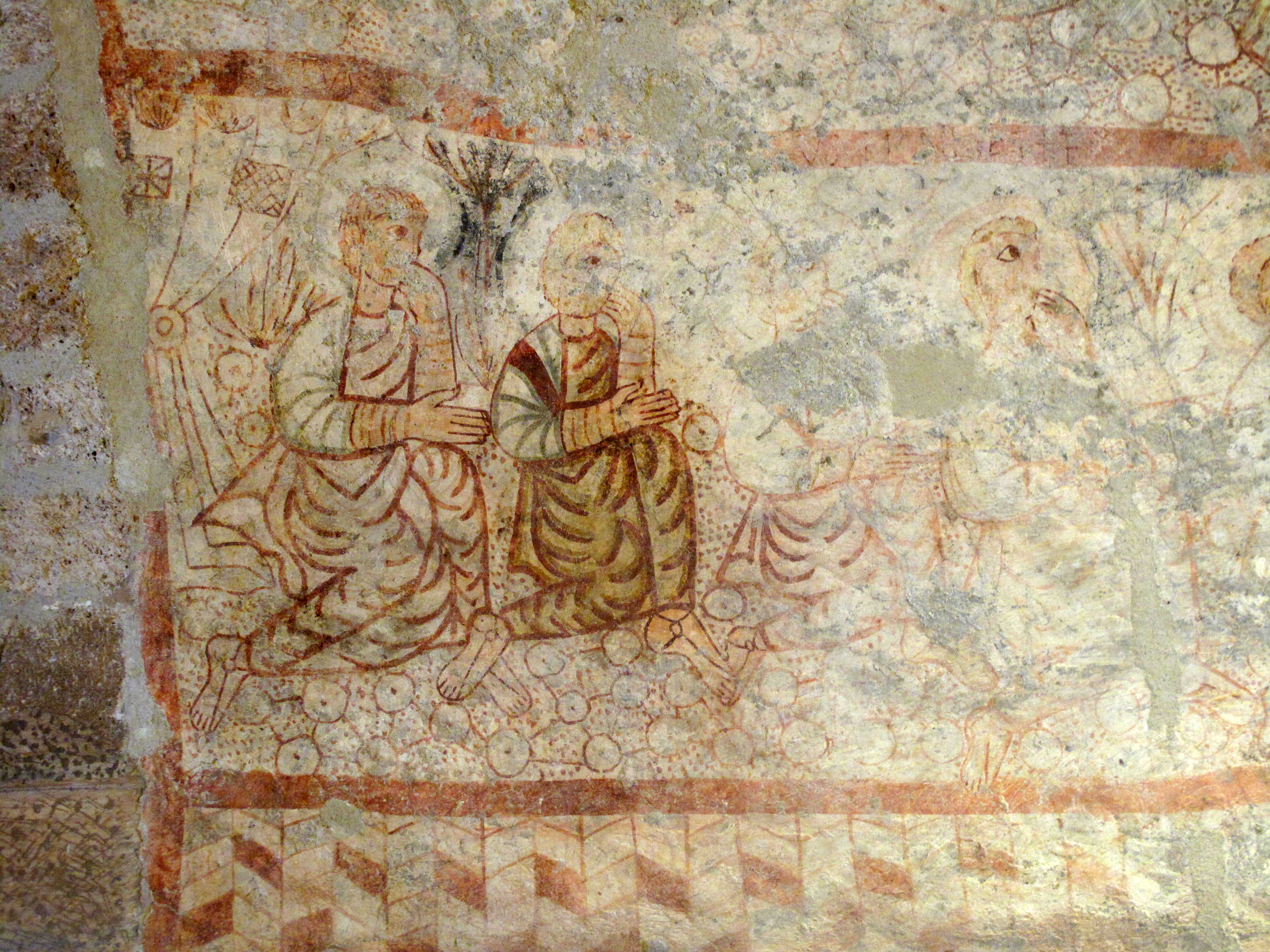
Figures from the Terrassa frescoes, which Kuhn compared to Cutbercht's portrayal of Matthew

The Cutbercht Gospels (Vienna, Austrian National Library, Codex 1224) is an 8th-century illustrated Latin gospel book bound as a codex. It contains the four canonical gospels of Matthew, Mark, Luke and John as well as canon tables. It was copied and illustrated by an Englishman named Cutbercht (Cuthbert) at Saint Peter's Abbey in Salzburg.

The Cutbercht Gospels contain a prologue (from Jerome's Commentary on Matthew) which, with the first seventeen verses of Matthew 1, is derived from a different source text than the rest of the gospels. Matthew 1:1–17 is set off from the rest of the gospel and labelled praefatio (preface). The canon tables and the portrait of the evangelist are inserted before verse 18. The text and portraits of the canon tables are based on Italian models, while the overall structure of "arcades" is from a northern model, perhaps from Canterbury. Joseph Cincik detects "Slovak–Avar" or "Alpine–Danubian" influence in the decorative elements and even argues for Islamic influence via the Danubian cultures.

Each gospel is introduced with a portrait of the evangelist. The iconography of the evangelists can be traced back to 6th-century Ravenna, but the symbols included with two of them are from a different source. Matthew's pose and the colour scheme of the portraits has been compared to the contemporary frescoes in the church of Sant Miquel in Terrassa. The ornamentation of the text is in the Insular style with some motifs also found in Coptic textiles. Cutbercht may have made use of a pattern book designed for textiles.

The gospel book was produced in Salzburg, although older scholarship sometimes located it in Mercia or Northumbria. Cutbercht made use of several Insular scripts, but was working at Salzburg in the 780s or 790s, during the pontificate of Virgil (died 784) or his successor, Arn. Cincik would date it to after 796, when the Avar capital was sacked during the Avar Wars, allowing eastern motifs—such as pear-shaped leaves, of ultimately Persian origin—to be brought westward in the form of booty. Cutbercht may be the scribe responsible for a now fragmentary manuscript of the prophetic books from Kremsmünster (Stiftsbibliothek, Fragm.I/1). He is not named in the Salzburger Verbrüderungsbuch, indicating that he probably did not die at Salzburg. He may have been an itinerant artist. His Insular style was not followed by others at Salzburg.

== Bibliography ==
- Bullough, Donald A. (1998). "A Neglected Early Ninth-century Manuscript of the Lindisfarne Vita S. Cuthberti". Anglo-Saxon England. 27: 105–137. JSTOR 44510370.
- Cincik, Joseph G. (1958). Anglo-Saxon and Slovak-Avar Patterns of Cuthbert's Gospel: A Study in Slovak Art of the Early Carolingian Era. Editions Slovak Institute.
- Cramp, Rosemary J. (1977). "Schools of Mercian sculpture". In Ann Dornier (ed.). Mercian Studies. Leicester University Press. pp. 191–233.
- Kendrick, T. D. (1938). Anglo-Saxon Art to A.D. 900. Methuen.
- Kirschbaum, J. M. (1958–1959). "Review of Cincik 1958". Slavic and East-European Studies. 3 (4): 240–243. JSTOR 41055710.
- Kuhn, Charles L. (1928). "Notes on Some Spanish Frescoes". Art Studies. 6: 128–130.
- Nees, Lawrence (1987). The Gundohinus Gospels. Medieval Academy of America.
- Tholl, Susan E. von Daum (1986). The Vienna Cutbercht Gospels (Wien, Oesterreichische Nationalbibliothek, Codex 1224) (PhD diss.). Columbia University. ProQuest 8906505
- Tholl, Susan E. von Daum (1995). "The Cutbercht Gospels and the Earliest Writing Center at Salzburg". In Linda L. Brownrigg (ed.). Making the Medieval Book: Techniques of Production. Anderson-Lovelace. pp. 17–37.
- Tilghman, Benjamin C. (2016). "Ornament and Incarnation in Insular Art". Gesta. 55 (2): 157–177.
