= Evangelist portrait =

Type of miniature in manuscripts

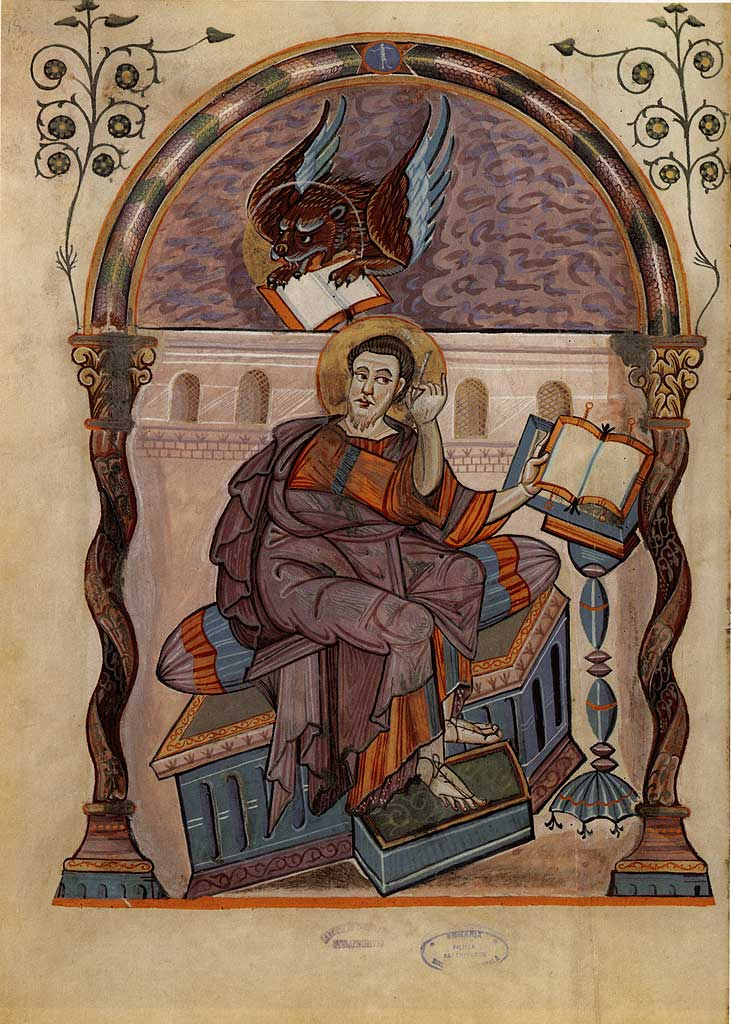
Codex Aureus of Lorsch portrait of Mark with his symbol, around 800

Evangelist portraits are a specific type of miniature included in ancient and mediaeval illuminated manuscript Gospel Books, and later in Bibles and other books, as well as other media. Each Gospel of the Four Evangelists, the books of Matthew, Mark, Luke, and John, may be prefaced by a portrait of the Evangelist, usually occupying a full page. Their symbols may be shown with them, or separately. Often they are the only figurative illumination in the manuscript. They are a common feature in larger Gospel Books from the earliest examples in the 6th century until the decline of that format for illustrated books in the High Middle Ages, by which time their conventions were being used for portraits of other authors.

== Author portraits ==
They originate in the classical secular tradition of the author portrait, which was often the only illustration in a classical manuscript, also used as a frontispiece (not unlike the contemporary author photo, though this is usually shown on the back cover or wrapper). A very few examples of Late Antique secular author portraits survive, and rather more later copies. Some examples also draw on the conventions of the Late Antique consular portrait, much used for the Emperors, who were also consuls. Examples of these, copied from the original, can be seen in the Chronography of 354 (see also the Missorium of Theodosius I of 30 years later). The Evangelist may be holding a book, but is not writing in it, and he faces the front on a large throne, surrounded by an elaborate frame, usually domed or pedimented. These frameworks are thought to draw from the style of the Scaenae frons, or elaborate proscenium structures of Roman theatres.

== Evangelists' symbols ==
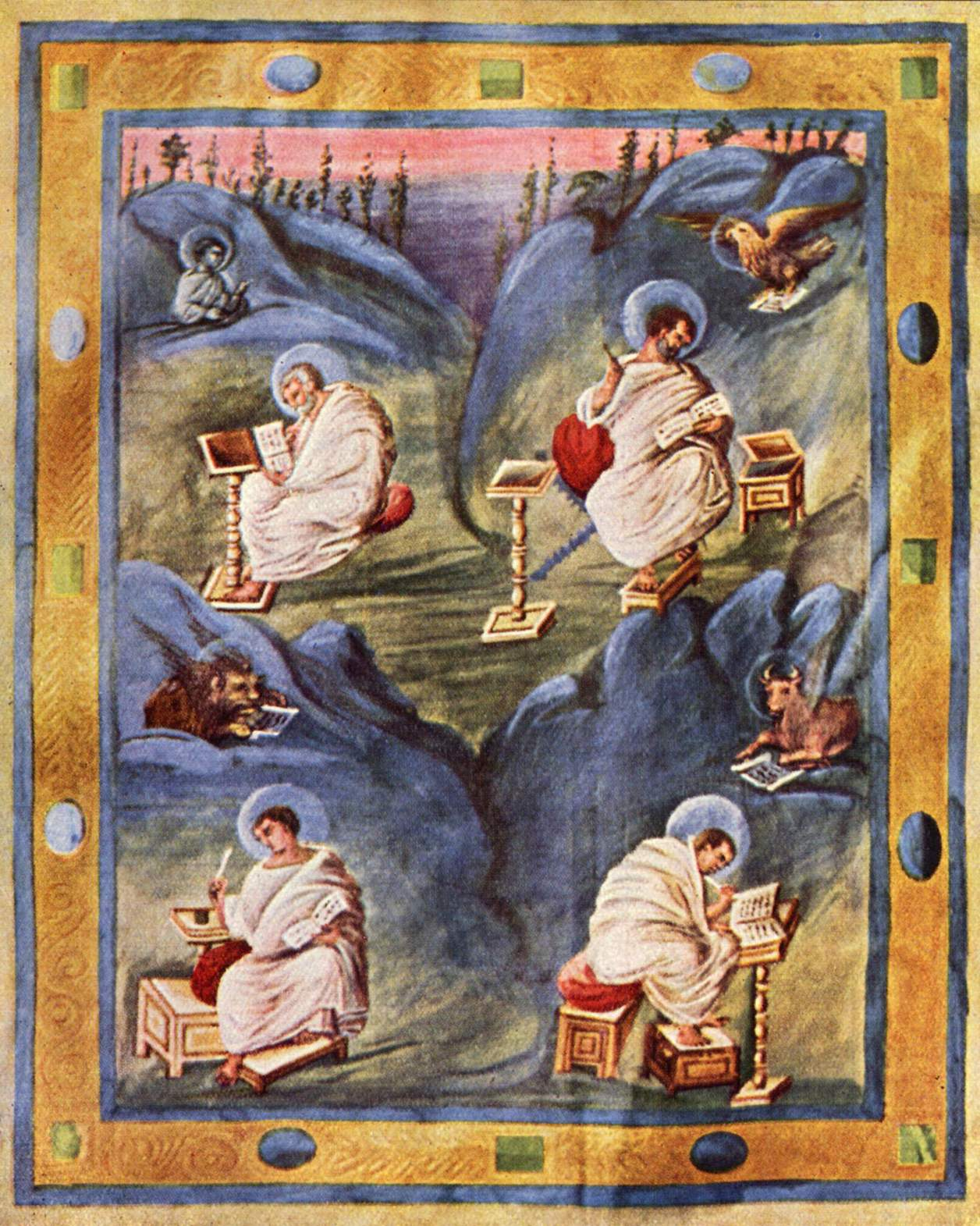
Carolingian miniature portraying the Evangelists with their symbols, from the Aachen Gospels, c. 820

The traditional symbols of the Evangelists were often included in the images, or especially in the Insular tradition, either given their own additional images on a separate page, or used instead of an evangelist portrait. The symbols are: the Lion of Mark, the Eagle of John, the Ox or Calf of Luke and the Angel or Man of Matthew. Often all are shown with wings, as in the familiar winged lion used in the coat of arms of Venice, whose patron saint was Mark. Sometimes, as in the example from Lorsch, the symbols are shown dictating the text to the evangelist.

The symbols of the four evangelists are derived from a vision in the book of the Old Testament prophet Ezekiel of four living creatures in the form of men, but each with four faces:

"As for the likeness of their faces, each had the face of a man in front; the four had the face of a lion on the right side, the four had the face of an ox on the left side, and the four had the face of an eagle at the back." (Ezek. 1:10)

Christian iconographic tradition came to associate the man with Saint Matthew, the lion with Saint Mark, the ox with Saint Luke, and the eagle with Saint John.

== Depictions and other media ==
Late Antique evangelist portraits often show standing figures, as in the ivory panels of the Throne of Maximianus in Milan, but from the Insular art of the 7th to 10th centuries, evangelist portraits in manuscripts nearly always closely followed the seated classical models, showing the Evangelists at full-length, either looking out at the viewer or writing at a table or desk and seen at an oblique angle. These were derived from unknown classical prototypes, similar to those in the Codex Amiatinus and Saint Augustine Gospels, though both of these types are rather different from the general types. Usually a setting is provided for the figure. Details of the classical models, such as anachronistic scrolls and scroll-boxes, and a small writing-stand with a single dolphin-shaped support (see gallery below), survive well into the Middle Ages, sometimes clearly misunderstood by the artists concerned. Perhaps because of the secular origins of the typology, haloes are less likely to be worn than in other types of image. The level of detail shown in the furniture and fittings is unusual for Early Medieval art. An arch behind the author, often with curtains hanging across it, in some examples close to the classical models, gradually is turned into a decorative framing device for the whole scene.

Early Gospel Books often had a very elaborate and costly treasure binding or cover in metalwork, often with jewels and ivories. These most often featured a central panel with Christ in Majesty, often including the Evangelists and/or their symbols in the corners. Versions of the same composition appear in all media used for Early Medieval religious art, including wall paintings. The Tassilo Chalice is an 8th-century example of pure metalwork with five oval medallion portraits of Christ and the Evangelists (with symbols) round the cup.

== Insular variants and decline ==
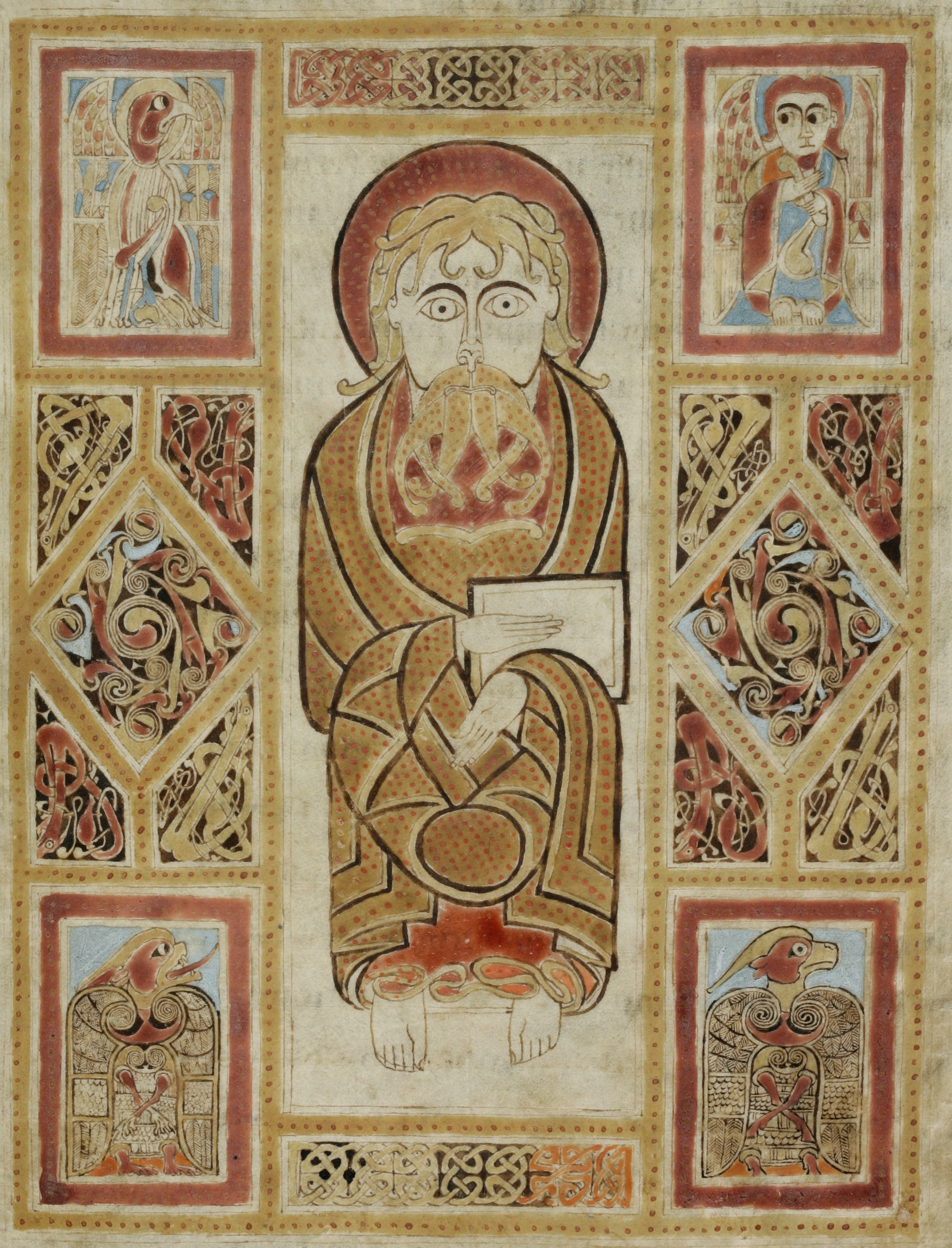
Insular, 8th century, now St Gall. Unusually, a single unspecified Evangelist with all four symbols

The early artists of the Insular period often show evangelists from the front who appear to be standing, although a chair is drawn behind them; the human figure was not a focus of interest or skill for these artists. Later Insular depictions seem to show figures without chairs, who are standing. Most of Europe continued to use the seated model however, usually seen in a three-quarters on view, and usually with a cushion behind. Sometimes all four evangelists were combined on a page, sometimes around a Christ in Majesty. Standing portraits were usual, however, for wall and later panel paintings (and in the Tree of Jesse composition) with the Evangelists often treated as, and mixed with, other saints.

The Gospel book as a medium for heavily illustrated manuscripts declined in the West from the Romanesque period, and with it the use of the Evangelist portrait. In the Eastern Orthodox world, the Gospel Book remained a primary focus for illumination, and Evangelist portraits, derived from contemporary Byzantine versions, are heavily represented among the earliest illuminations from the new Slav national traditions, such as the 11th-century Ostromir Gospels and the Khitrovo Gospels of about 1390 from Muscovy. In the West the portraits continued to be found in Bibles, more often as the picture within a historiated initial at the start of each Gospel. Other books sometimes contained them as well. Similar compositions began to be used for other saint-authors, especially for St Jerome, who is often shown in a book-lined study, often with his symbol, a lion, dozing at his feet. Similarly St Gregory the Great may be shown with a dove, representing his inspiration from the Holy Spirit, whispering in his ear.

== Gallery ==
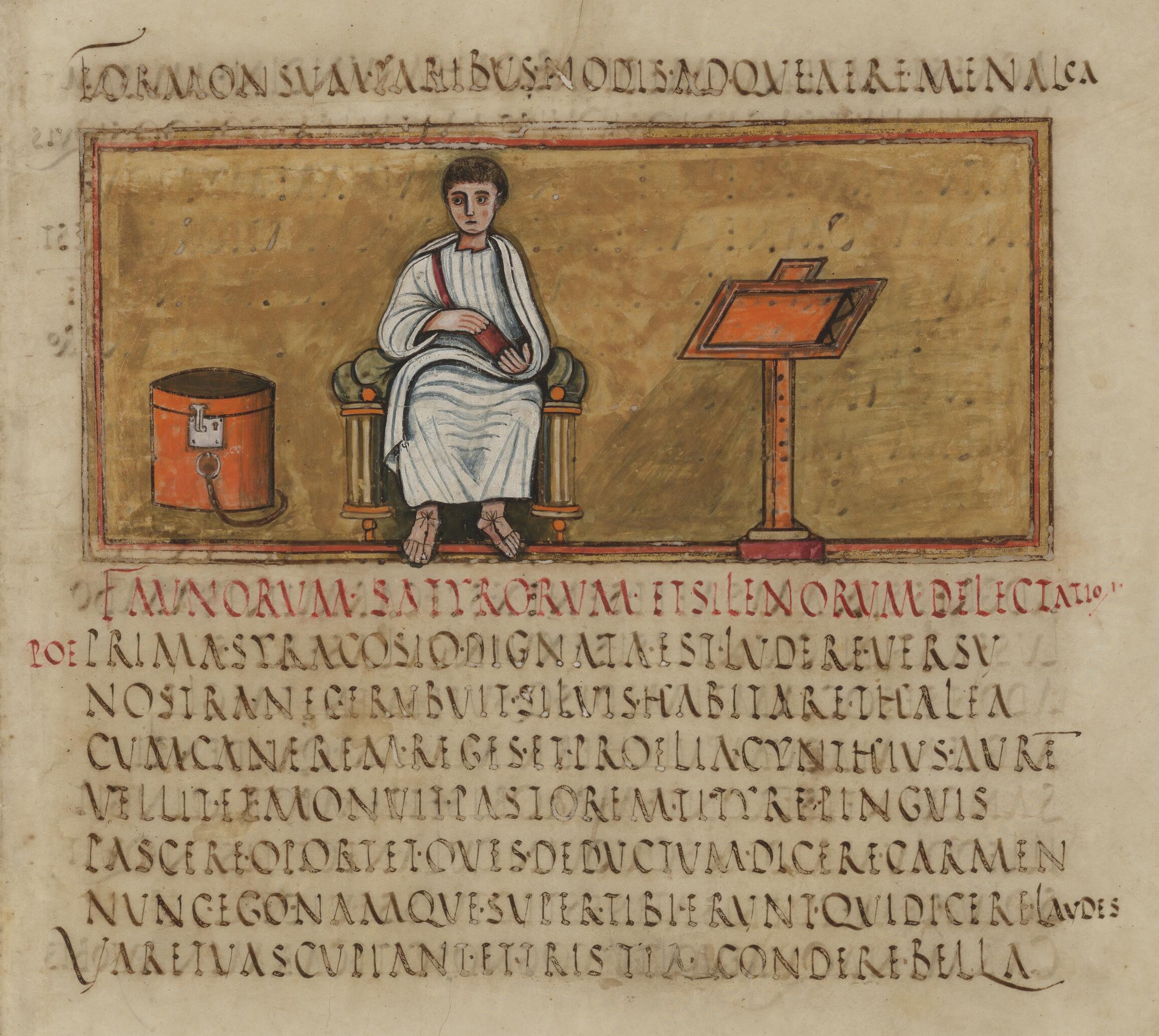
Virgil from the Roman Virgil, A 5th-century secular author portrait in the classical tradition. Note the scroll-box, although the book it is in is a codex.

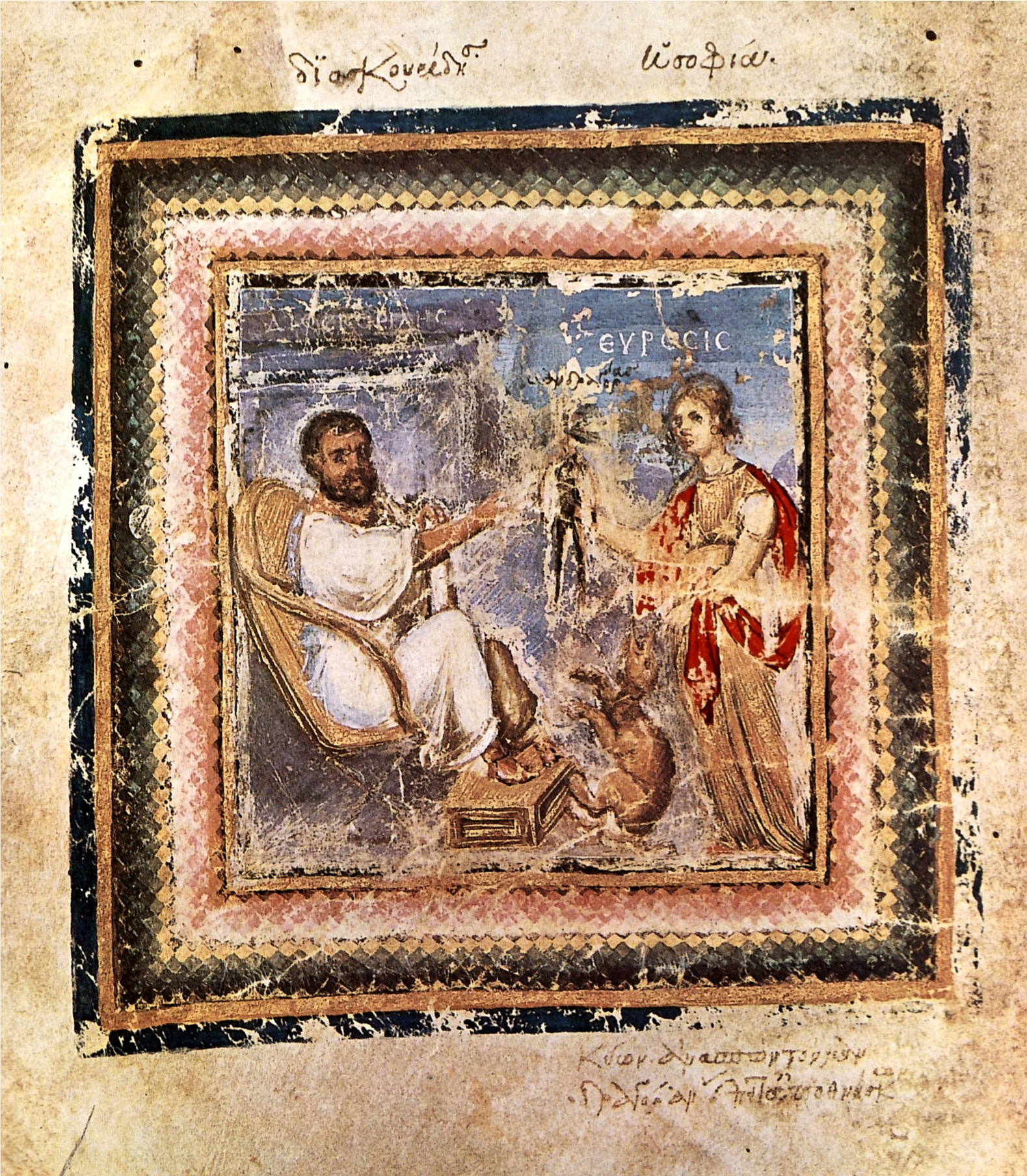
One of three author portraits in the Vienna Dioscurides of the 1st-century physician author. He is painting a plant held by its personification. Early 6th-century Byzantine.

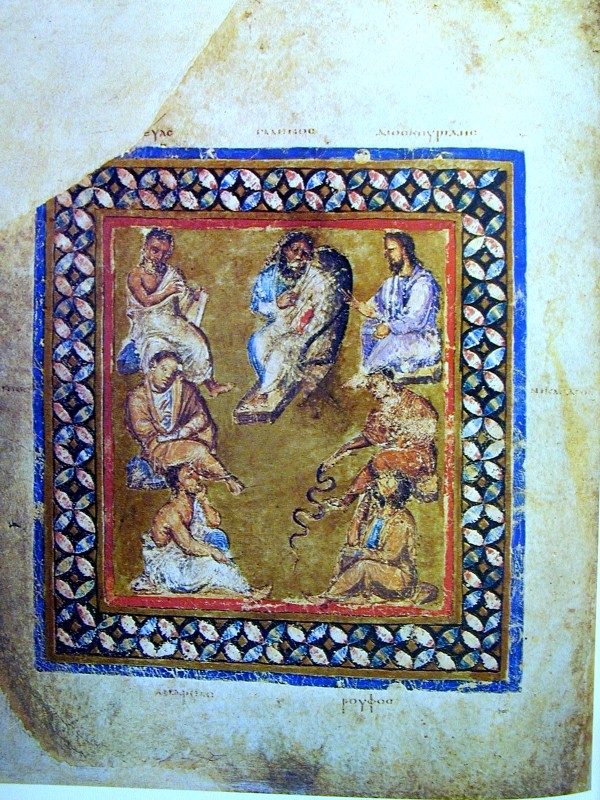
Group author portrait of distinguished physicians from the Vienna Dioscurides. Presumably collated from individual portraits in their works. Only Galen has a chair.

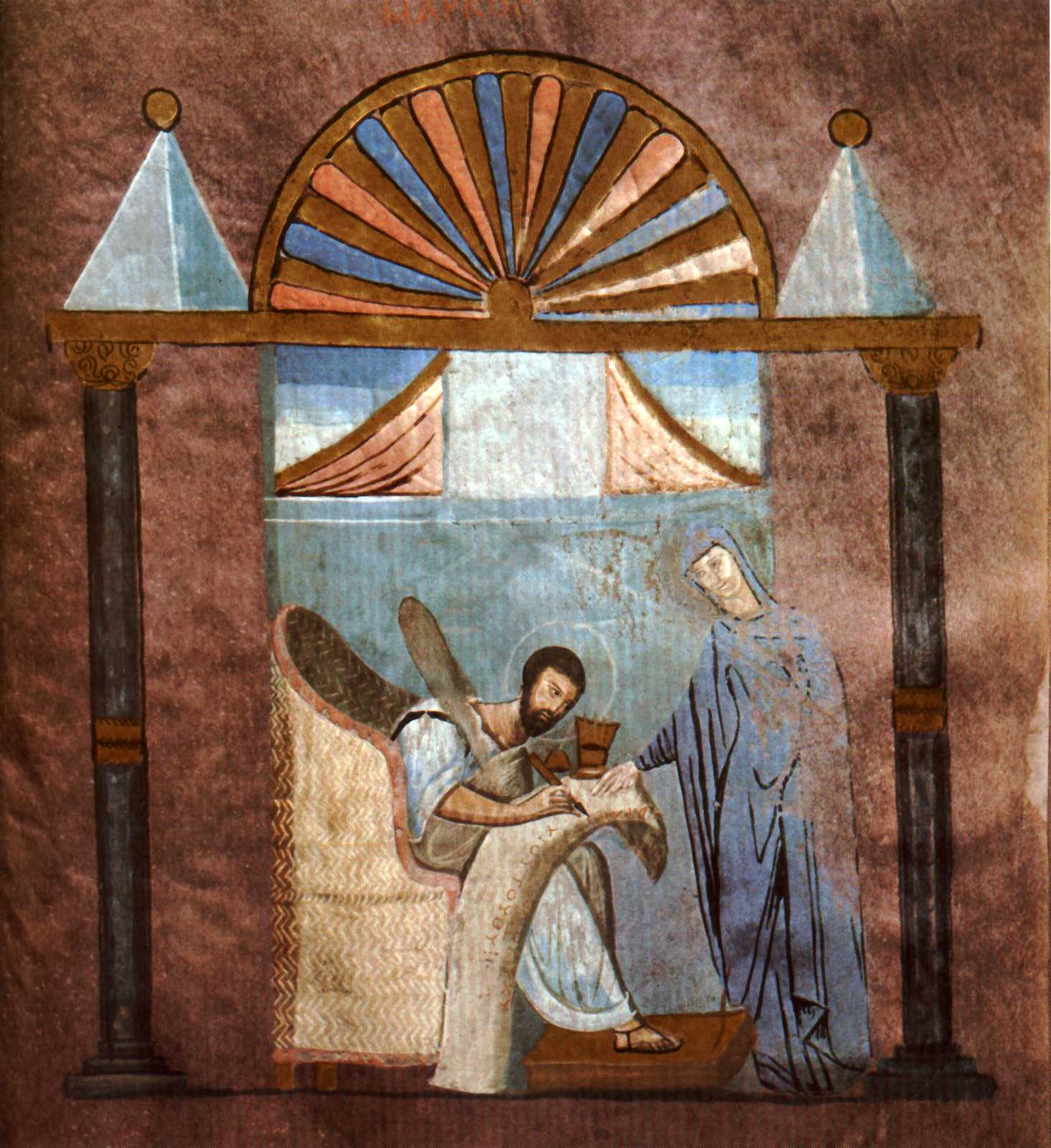
Among the earliest surviving evangelist portrait, in the Rossano Gospels, Mark writing on a scroll, 6th century. Written under Byzantine rule in Italy (the mark above his shoulders is a stain).

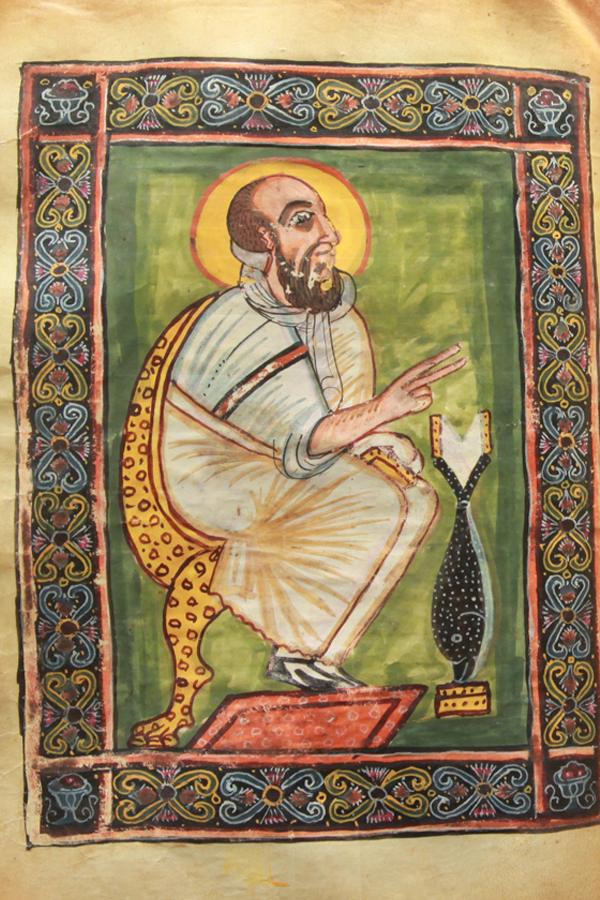
Portrait of the Evangelist Mark from the Ethiopic Garima Gospels, carbon dated to the 5th or early 6th century. Written in Axum, Ethiopia, following Late Antique Egyptian models.

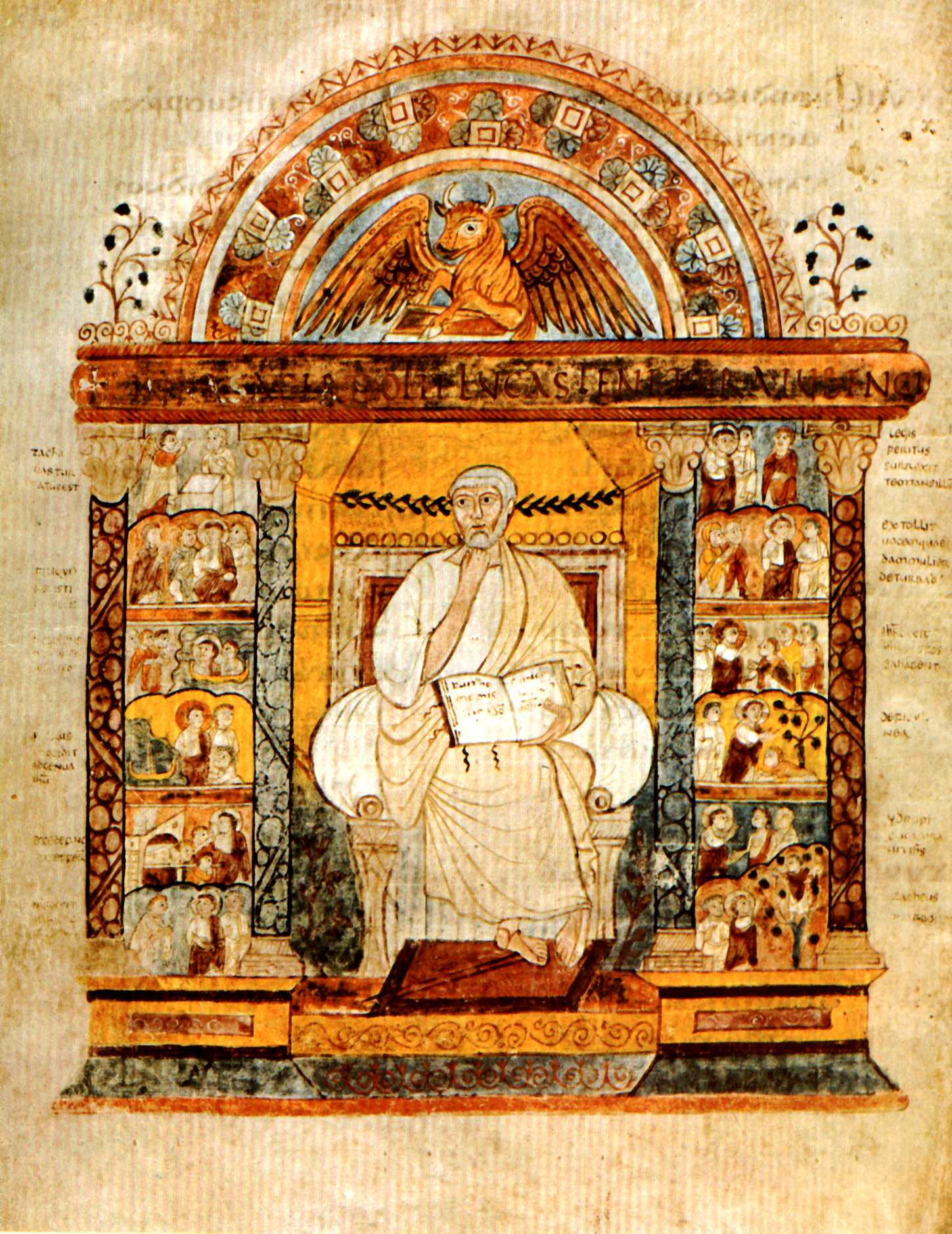
Luke in the St. Augustine Gospels, 6th century. Italian. Following more formal classical models, like the imperial consular portraits in the Chronography of 354.

Imago Leonis - the Lion of Mark from the Echternach Gospels which show no portraits, only the symbols. Insular c. 690.

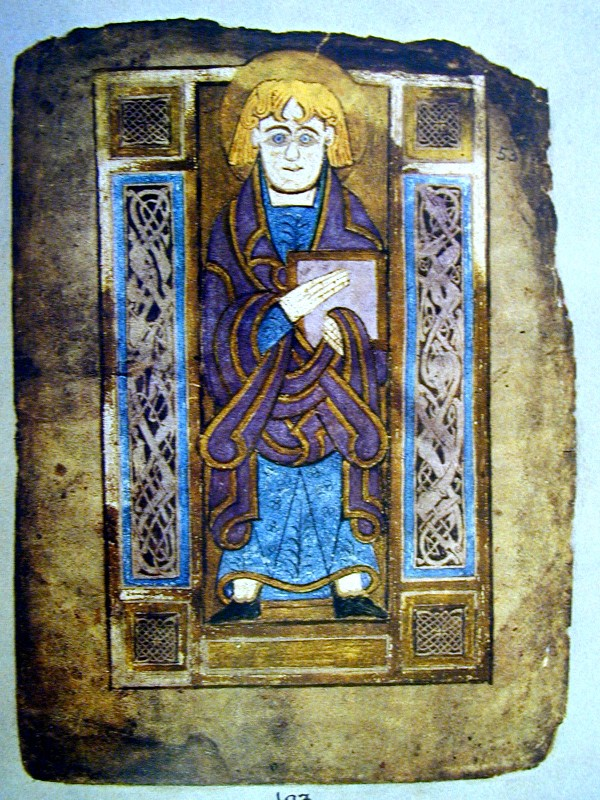
John, Book of Mulling, late 8th-century Insular pocket gospel books, with the portraits as the only whole page illumination.

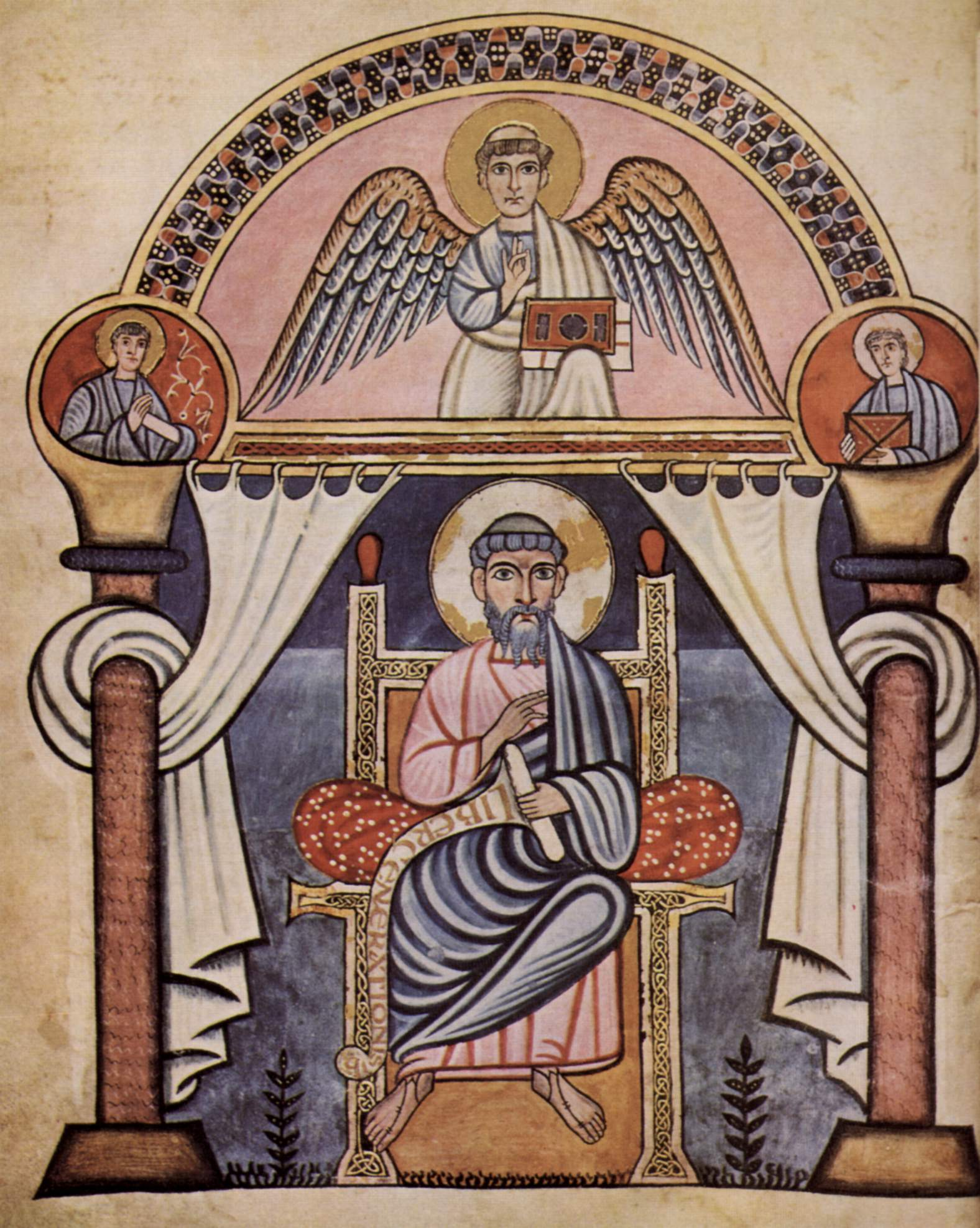
Matthew; Anglo-Saxon 8th century, combining many classical details, such as the curtains, with interlace decoration on the chair. Stockholm Codex Aureus

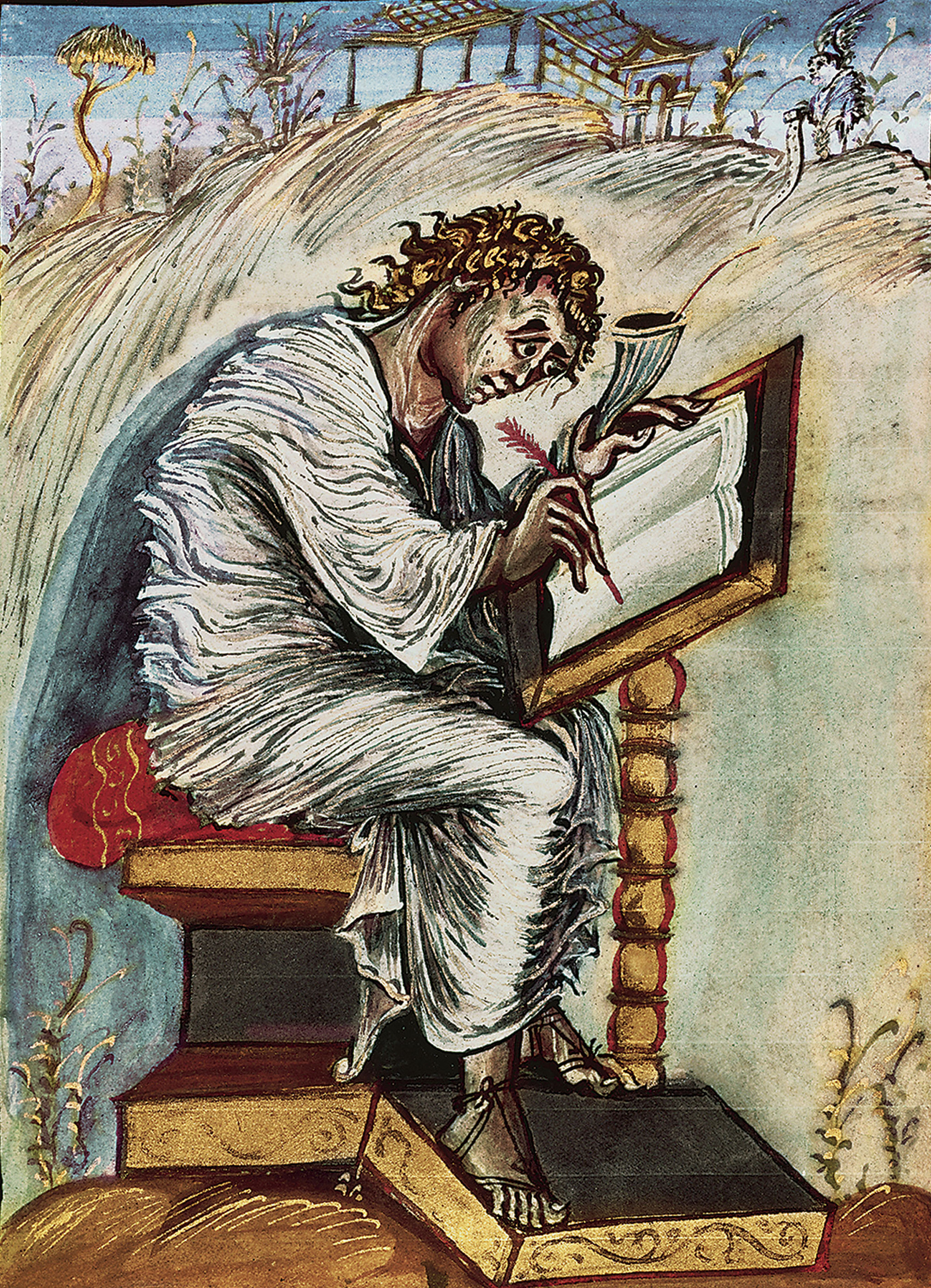
Ebbo Gospels, 9th century, Matthew

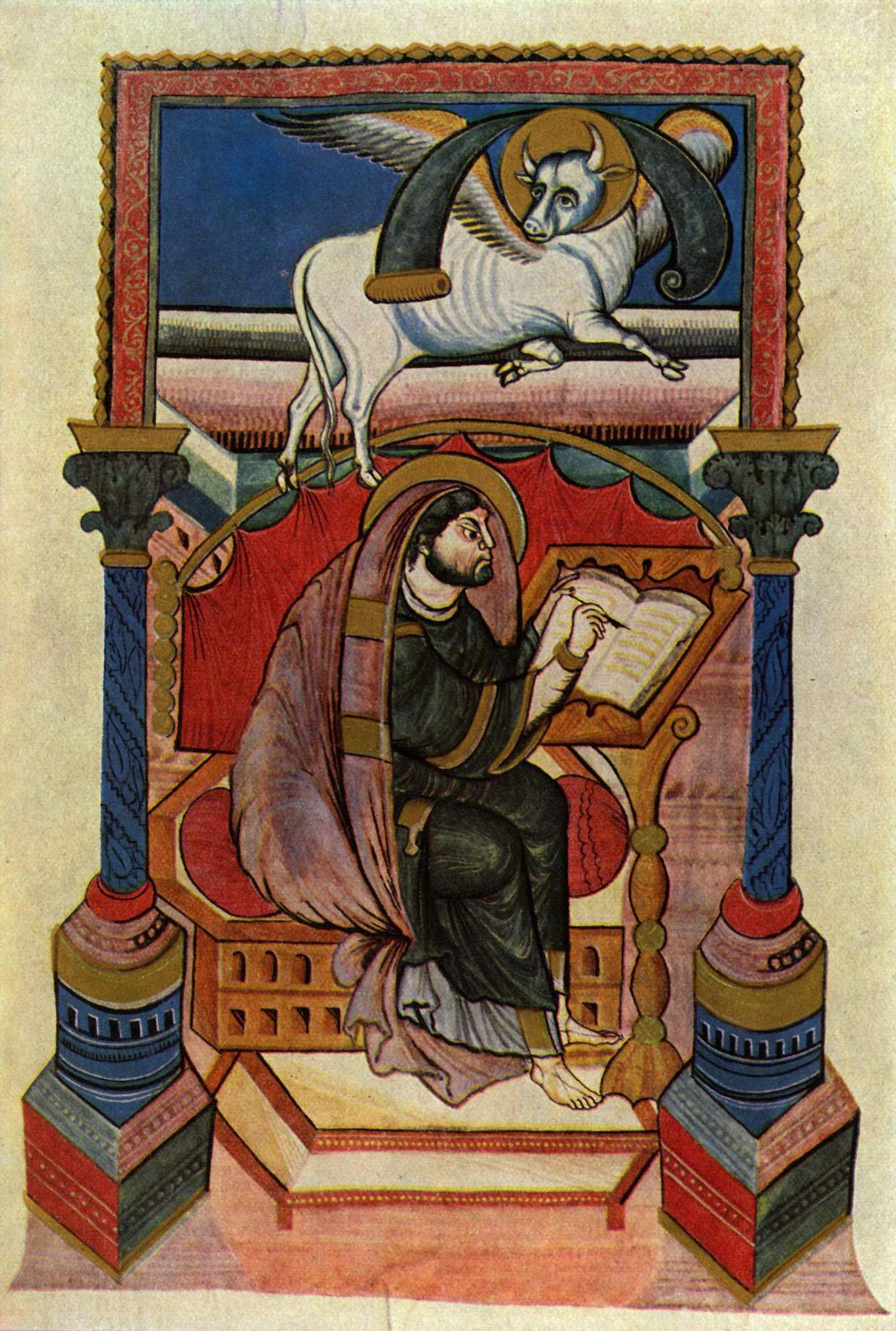
Luke, Fulda School, c. 840

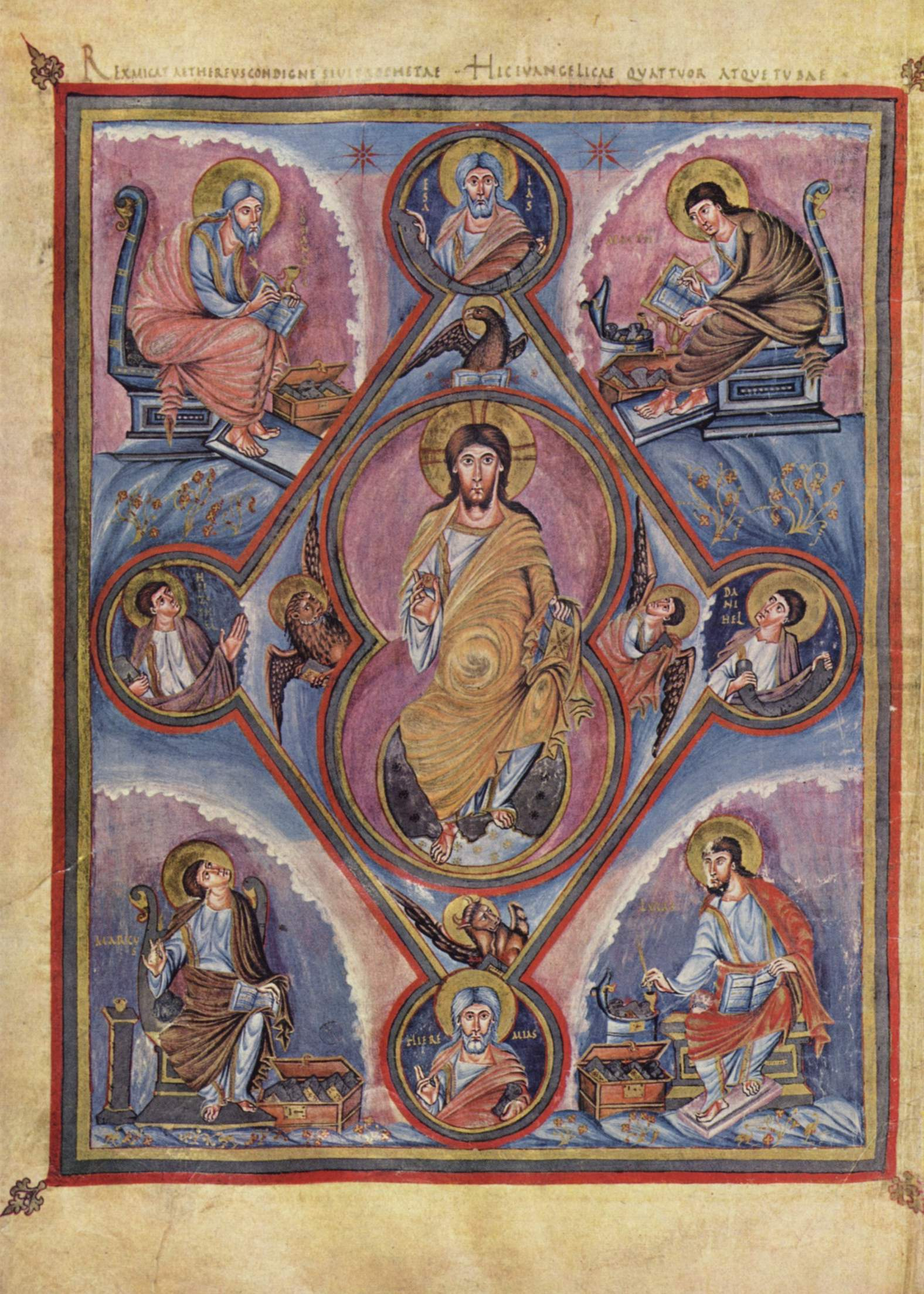
Four evangelists and prophets surround Christ. c. 850 by Haregarius of Tours.

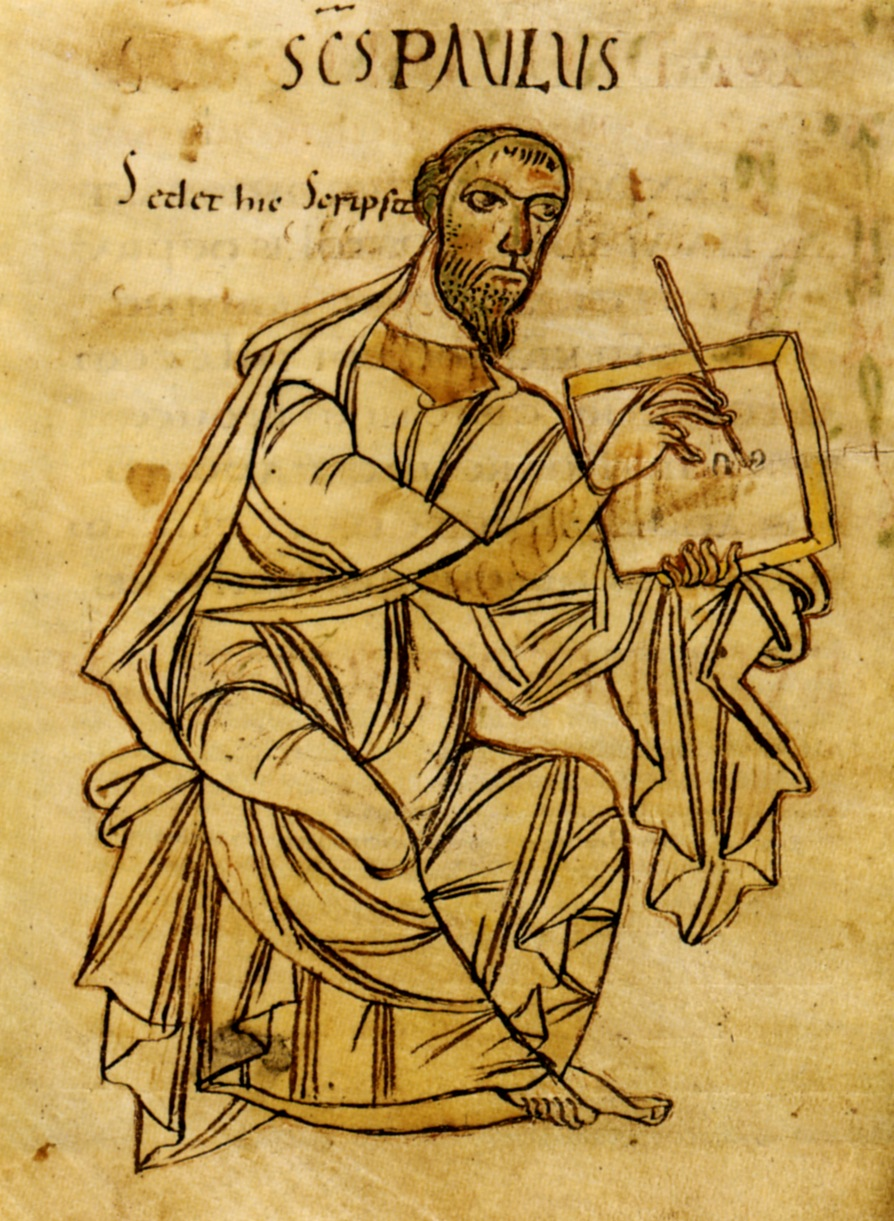
A much rarer author portrait of St Paul 9th century, follows similar conventions.

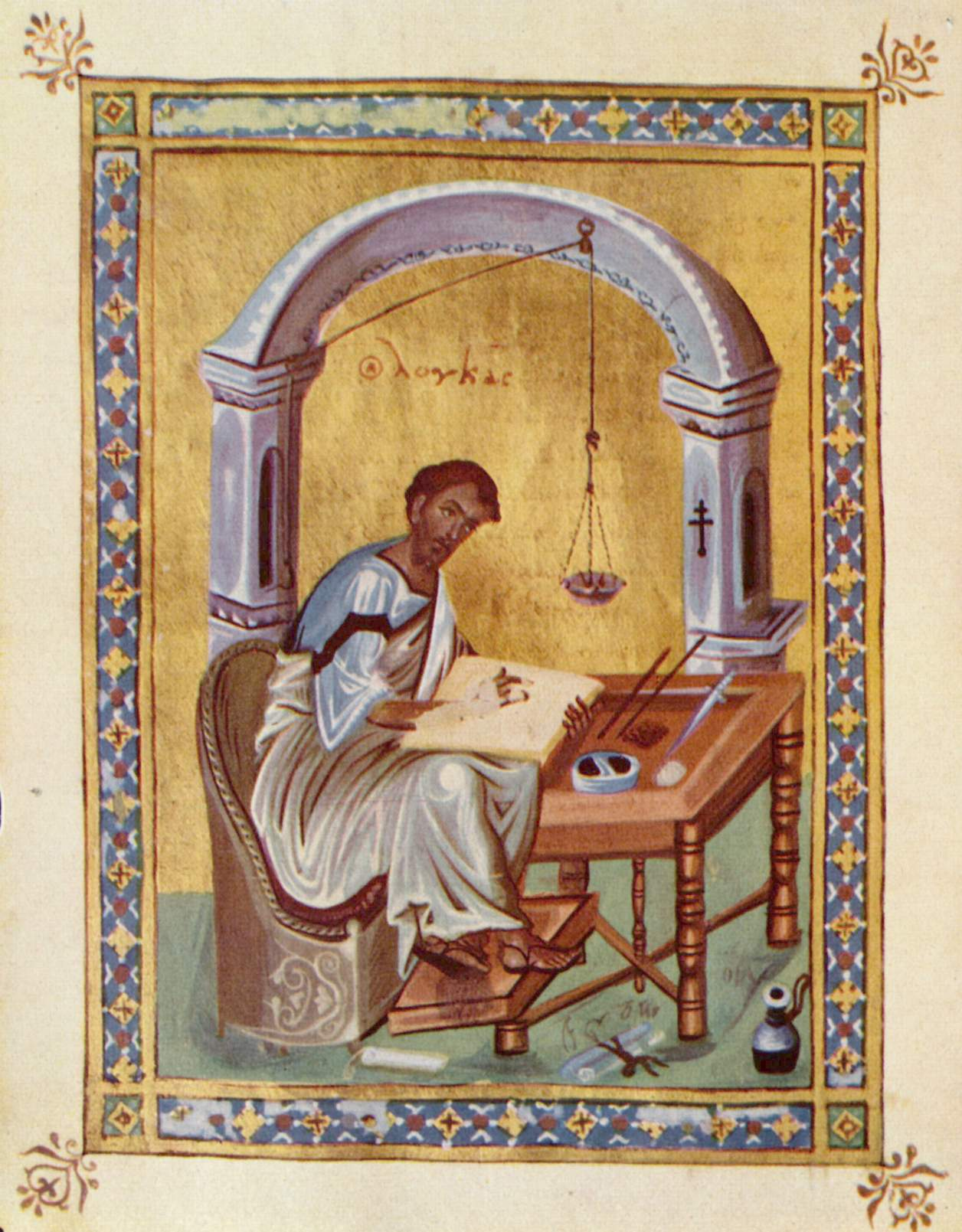
Luke, Byzantine, 10th century, British Library. The side-table with writing materials is much more typical of the Orthodox world.

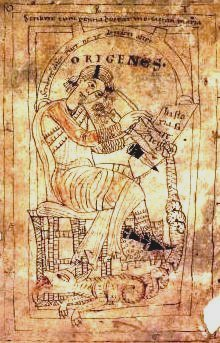
Origen; The dolphin-shaped lectern stem, still understood in Byzantine examples, has metamorphosed into a kind of dragon in northern Europe

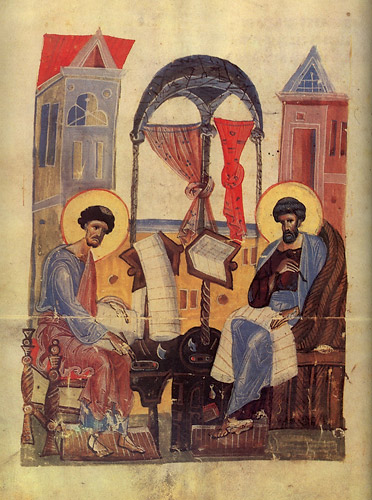
Spassky Gospels, Yaroslavl, 1220s. Compare the arch and curtains with the Chrongraphy of 354; their function now seems lost in this double portrait, whose artist is also unclear how a scroll functions.

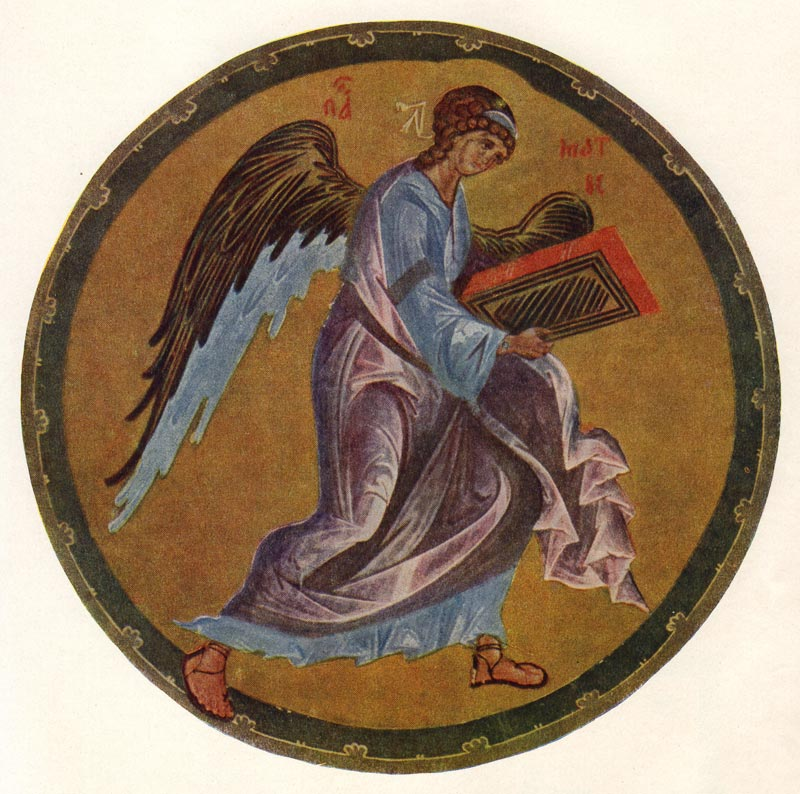
The Angel of Matthew, Andrei Rublev's only known miniature, from the Khitrovo Gospels, c. 1400, containing full-page evangelist portraits and the first Russian full-page symbols.

John, from the Cutbercht Gospels (8th century)
