= Little Pripyat =

Abandoned Soviet military housing area in Brandenburg, Germany

Brand Military Garrison Garnison Flugplatz Brand
- Abandoned military town
- Location within Brandenburg
- Coordinates: 52°01′43″N 13°45′27″E
- Country: Germany
- State: Brandenburg
- District: Dahme-Spreewald

Brand Military Garrison (popularly known as "Little Pripyat" or "Klein-Pripjat") is an abandoned Soviet-era residential complex located within the forest of Halbe, Brandenburg. It served the personnel of the adjacent Brand-Briesen Airfield, which was one of the primary airbases for the 16th Air Army of the Group of Soviet Forces in Germany.

The site is located immediately south of the Tropical Islands Resort, which occupies the former Cargolifter hangar constructed on the airfield's western edge in the late 1990s. Originally established as a Luftwaffe airfield (Fliegerhorst Briesen) in the late 1930s, the site was captured by the Red Army in April 1945. During the Cold War, the Soviet Air Force expanded the facility to accommodate the 116th Guards Fighter-Bomber Aviation Regiment. To support the personnel, a massive residential district (Militärstädtchen) was constructed to house approximately 4,000 residents. Following the withdrawal of Russian forces in 1992, the site was abandoned and transferred to German civil administration. The nickname "Little Pripyat" emerged within the urban exploration community due to the visual parallels with the abandoned city of Pripyat in Ukraine, specifically the rapid "rewilding" of concrete residential blocks and the presence of Soviet-era murals and artifacts left behind during the evacuation.

== See also ==
- Group of Soviet Forces in Germany
- Sperenberg Airfield
