= Igor Pasternak =

American aviation entrepreneur (born 1964)

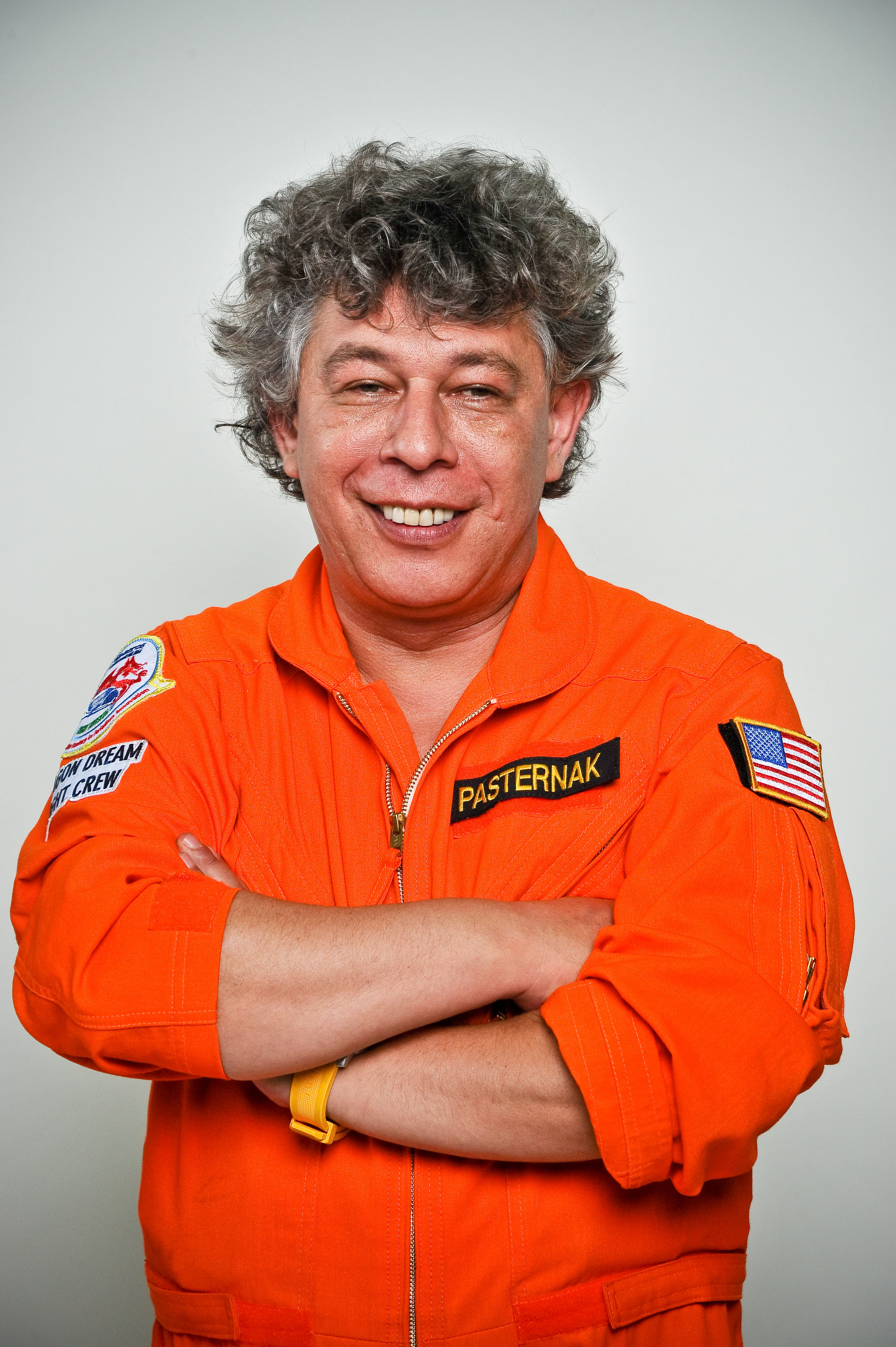
- Born: Igor Pasternak; 1964 (age 61–62); USSR
- Education: Lviv Polytechnic National University
- Occupations: Aviation entrepreneur, engineer, inventor
- Years active: 1986 - Present
- Known for: Aeros Corporation
- Website: aeroscraft.com

Igor Pasternak is an American aviation entrepreneur, specializing in designing and building airships. He is best known as the founder and CEO of Aeros Corporation, an American manufacturer of airships based in Montebello, California and for his research on variable buoyancy control for airships. Igor Pasternak is an advocate of the cargo airship industry and lighter-than-air flight.

== Biography ==
Igor Pasternak was born in the Kazakh Soviet Socialist Republic, one of the republics of the former Soviet Union, and is the eldest child in a family of Jewish descent. His parents, both civil engineers, later moved to Lviv, Ukraine, where he grew up. His younger sister, Marina, was also an engineer. As a child, Pasternak took an early interest in airships. According to The Seattle Times, Pasternak faced antisemitism in the USSR before Mikhail Gorbachev started Perestroika and couldn't study aeronautical engineering because both of his parents were Jewish. He studied civil engineering in Lviv Polytechnic National University. While an undergraduate student at university, Pasternak started an airship-design bureau in 1981, and by 1986 he founded Aeros Ltd., his first company producing aerostats and blimps for various applications including advertising and meteorology in the USSR and abroad. In 1994, Pasternak emigrated to the USA following his family.

== Entrepreneurship ==
Since 1994, Pasternak's entrepreneurial and engineering career in the US has been closely associated with Aeros Corporation

(alternatively known as Aeros), the company he re-established in the US. In 1994, Pasternak moved from New York to California and leased a hangar from the Castle Air Force Base (located two hours south of San Francisco) to build his first airship in the US - Aeros 50, a seventy-eight-foot long blimp. Aeros 50 was later sold for advertising during the 1996 Paralympic Games. Since then, Aeros has released and launched into serial production a number of new airship models including the Sky Dragon, the cargo airship Dragon Dream (Aeroscraft) and Tethered Aerostat System (TAS) among others. Aeros Corporation received various certifications including from Federal Aviation Administration (FAA) for some of its airships

=== Joint projects with the US government ===
Pasternak's company R&D has been intensively funded by the US government. Aeros signed contracts with The Pentagon through DARPA's project Walrus HULA and the Rapid Reaction Technology Office on building reconnaissance and cargo military airships, including $50 million project for the development of the Pelican prototype. In 2013, Pasternak led development and construction of Aeroscraft Dragon Dream, the first airship independent from ballast during cargo loading and able to conduct vertical take off and landing at fully load. In September 2013, after being cleared by the FAA, the Dragon Dream had its first tethered flight in Tustin, California.

== Contributions to Ukraine’s Security in Response to Russian Aggression ==
Igor Pasternak has played a significant role in supporting Ukraine's defense capabilities. In 2016, under a contract aimed at enhancing Ukraine's border security, Aeros deployed its Elevated Early Warning System (EEWS) along the Sea of Azov. The EEWS system was installed on Ukraine's Azov coast that year.

Following the launch of Russia's full-scale invasion of Ukraine in 2022, Pasternak and his company donated over $1 million worth of body armor to Ukrainian frontline forces. Additionally, he became involved in a confidential communications network coordinated by the U.S. Department of Defense, facilitating direct lines of contact between General Mark Milley, Chairman of the U.S. Joint Chiefs of Staff, and General Valerii Zaluzhny, Commander-in-Chief of the Armed Forces of Ukraine.

== Marina Pasternak Memorial Scholarship ==
In 2000, Pasternak's younger sister Marina and his friend Levon Sanamyan died in a tragic accident in a hangar of Aeros while working inside a blimp. To honor Marina Pasternak's memory and her contributions to the company, Pasternak founded The Marina Pasternak Memorial Scholarship. The scholarship is provided to female students of the Department of Engineering at Santa Monica College.

== Inventions ==
Pasternak is the inventor of Cargo Airship With Variable Buoyancy Control (the Aeroscraft). The discriminating utility of this technology is to built-in internal ballast control which allows a vertical take-off and landing (VTOL) and hover operation at max payload without the use of off-board ballasting, and off-loading stores while hovering. He also devised a method to compress helium, which allowed for the ship to be made heavier or lighter as necessary.

- Aerostructure for rigid body airship (US Patent 9,266,597)
- Flight system for a constant volume, variable buoyancy air vehicle (US Patent 9,016,622)
- Multi-chamber landing system for an air vehicle (US Patent 8,864,068)
- Rigid body airship (US Patent D663,255)
- Cockpit for hybrid air vehicle (United States Patent D631,817)

== Awards ==
Pasternak has earned multiple recognitions over the years based on his accomplishments in the airship and air mobility industries.

- Small Business Person of the Year for L.A. 2006
- Small Business Person of the Year for L.A. 2010
- Top USA Entrepreneur with Ukrainian Origin 2023

== See also ==
- Dragon Dream
- Castle Air Force Base
- Walrus HULA
