= STOL =

Class of airplanes designed to take off and land in a short distance

External videos
- STOL Ultralight taking off and landing

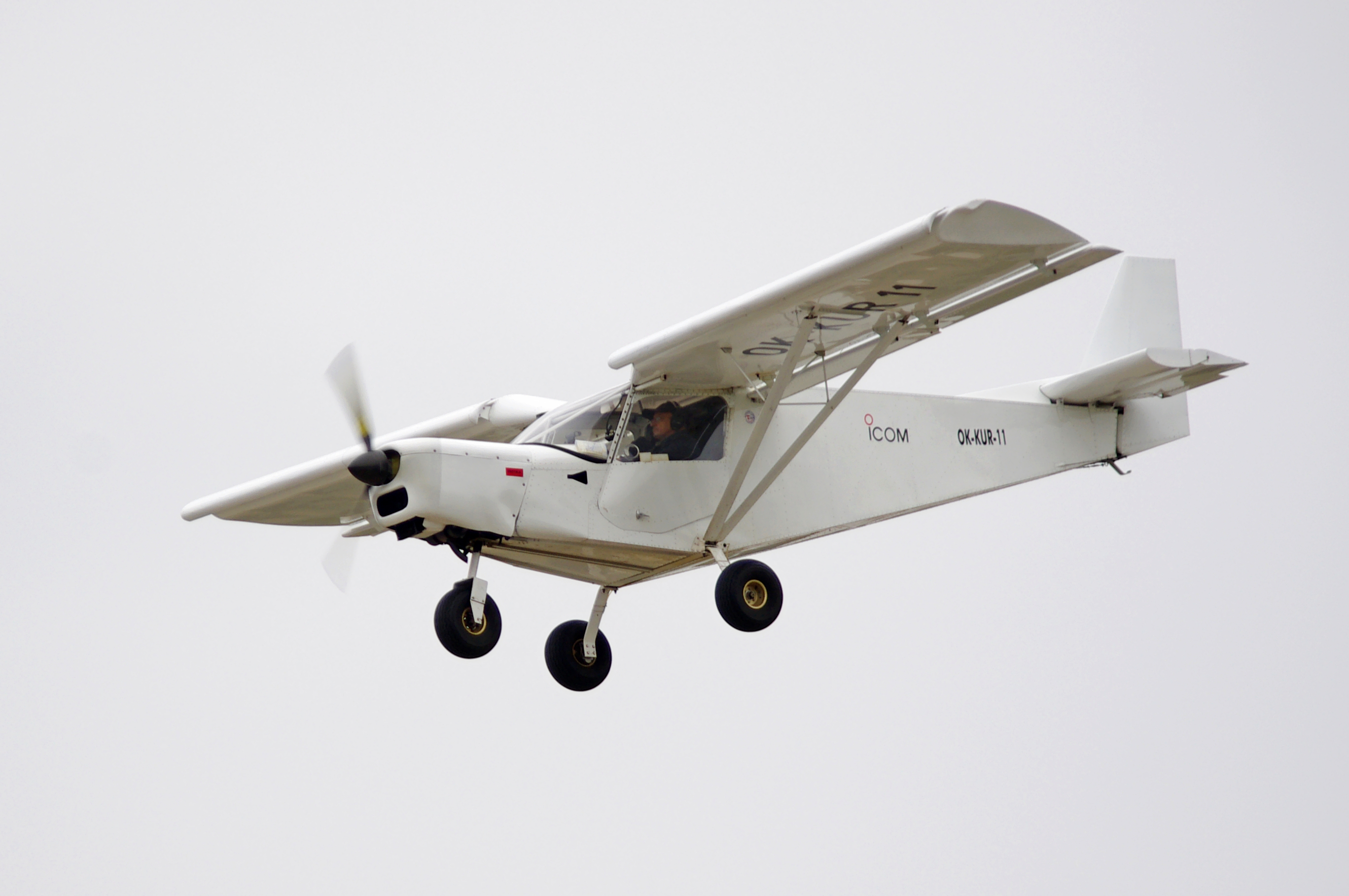
A Zenair CH 701 STOL light aircraft

A short-takeoff-and-landing (STOL) aircraft is a fixed-wing aircraft that can take off and land on runways that are much shorter than the typical ones needed for conventional take-off and landing. STOL-capable aircraft are usually light aircraft (mostly propeller-driven utility aircraft, sporters or motor gliders) with a high lift-to-drag ratio and typically also a high aspect ratio, allowing them to achieve minimum takeoff speed (i.e. liftoff speed or V_{LOF}) much more quickly, thus requiring a shorter accelerating run before taking off (takeoff roll), and perform landing at a lower minimum steady flight speed (V_{S0}), thus also a shorter decelerating run (rollout).

Gyrocopters, despite being rotary-wing aircraft, need a forward motion to drive air flow past autorotating rotor blades to generate lift and thus still mandate runways (albeit a very short one) for takeoff and landing. They are therefore also considered STOL aircraft, as they cannot perform vertical takeoff and landing like helicopters.

STOL aircraft, including those used in scheduled passenger transport operations, can be operated from STOLport airfields that feature dedicated short runways. They can also operate on improvised airstrips with unpaved runways (e.g., dirt roads or bulldozed grassfield tracks) and/or harsher conditions, such as remote airfields built in high altitude alpine regions, deserts, or on snow/ice fields.

== Design ==
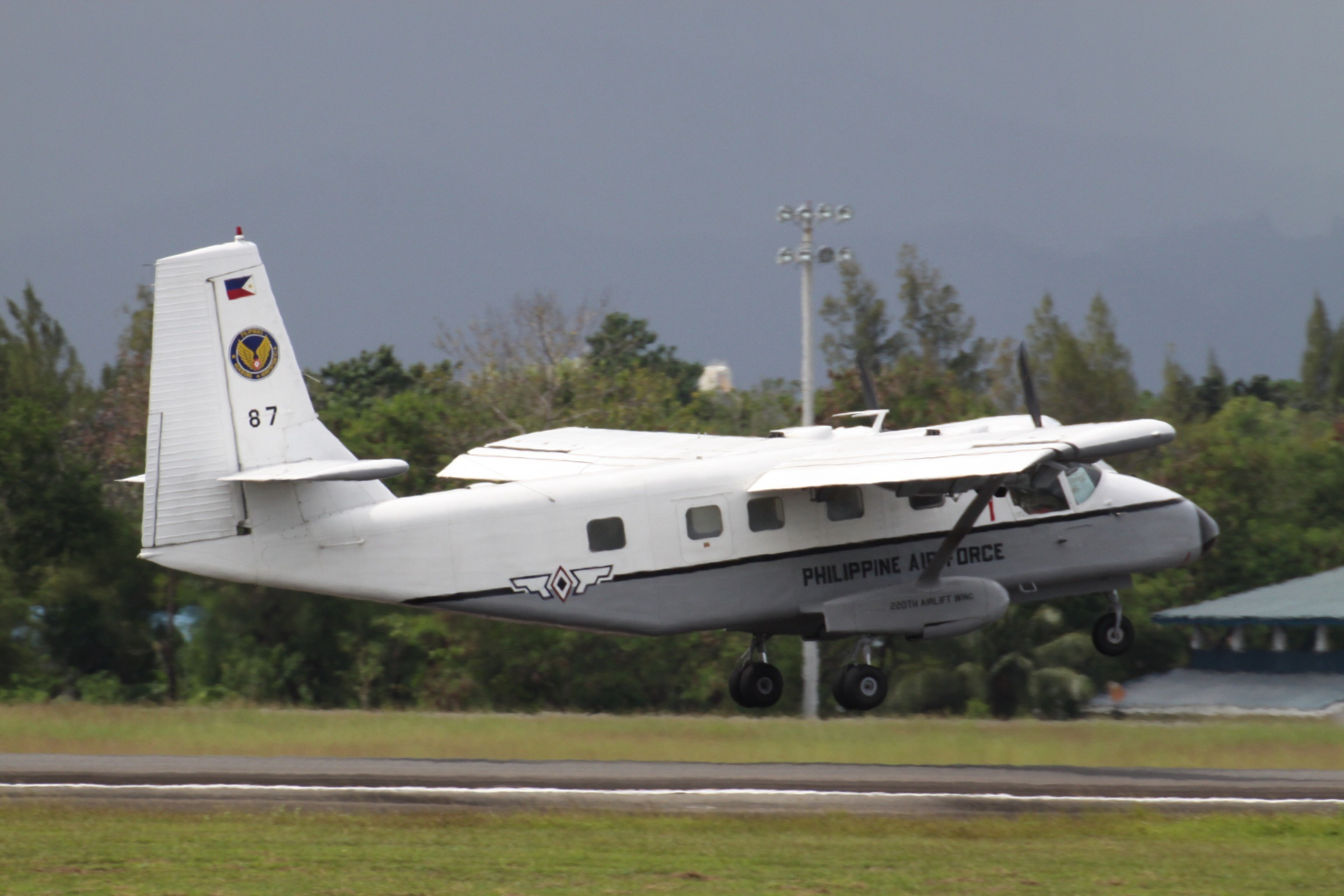
GAF Nomad of the Philippine Air Force

STOL aircraft are built in configurations such as bush planes, autogyros, and taildraggers, and those such as the de Havilland Canada Dash-7 that are designed for use on conventional airstrips. The PAC P-750 XSTOL, the Daher Kodiak, the de Havilland Canada DHC-6 Twin Otter, and the Wren 460 have STOL capability, needing a short ground roll to get airborne, but are capable of a near-zero ground roll when landing.

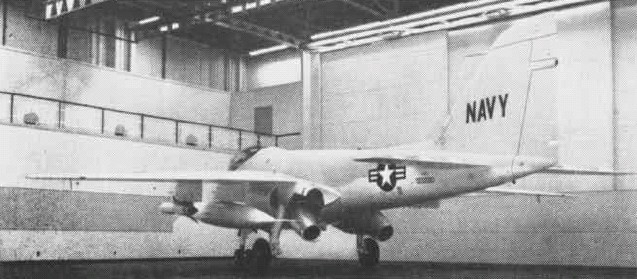
Grumman YA2F-1 Intruder with tilting STOL nozzles

For any plane, the required runway length is a function of the square of the stall speed (minimum flying speed), and much design effort is spent on minimizing this number. For takeoff, large power-to-weight ratios and low drag help the plane to accelerate for flight. For landing, the length is minimized by strong brakes, low landing speed, and thrust reversers or spoilers. Overall STOL performance is set by the longer of the runway needed to land or take off.

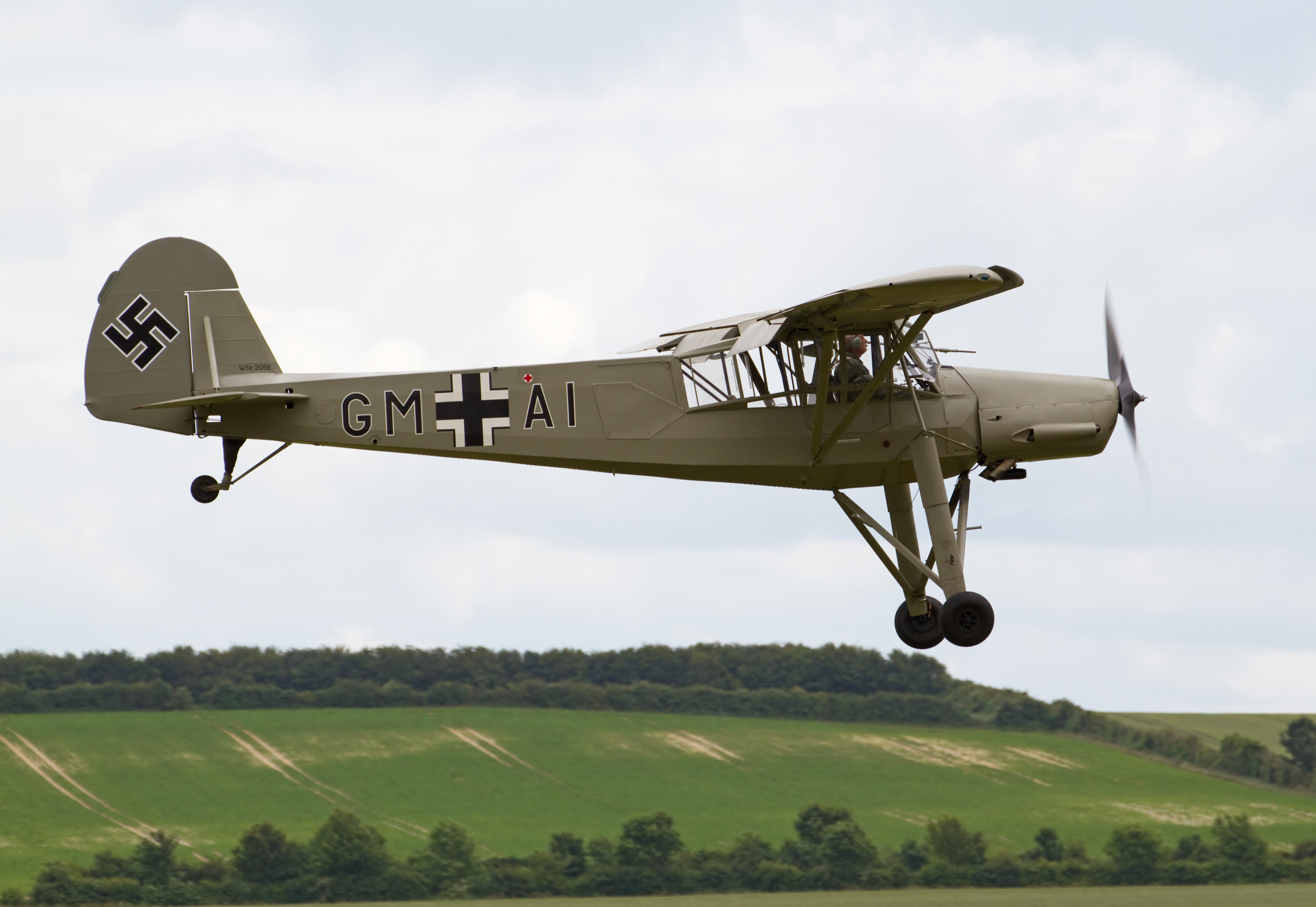
Fieseler Storch with German Luftwaffe markings

Of equal importance to runway length is the ability to clear obstacles, such as hills, beyond the runway. For takeoff, large power-to-weight ratios and low drag increase the climb gradient that can be achieved – required to clear obstacles. For landing, high drag allows the plane to descend steeply without building speed, which would require a longer ground run. Drag is increased by use of flaps on the wings and by forward slip (causing the plane to fly somewhat sideways to increase drag).

Typically, a STOL aircraft has a large wing for its weight. These wings may use aerodynamic devices such as flaps, slots, slats, and vortex generators. Typically, achieving excellent STOL performance reduces maximum speed, but not payload ability. The payload is critical, because many small, isolated communities rely on STOL aircraft as their only link to the outside world for passengers or cargo; examples include many communities in the Canadian north and Alaska.

Most STOL aircraft can land either on- or off-airport. Typical off-airport landing areas include snow or ice (using skis), fields or gravel riverbanks (often using special fat, low-pressure tundra tires), and water (using floats): these areas are often short and obstructed by trees or hills. Wheel skis and amphibious floats combine wheels with skis or floats, allowing landing on snow/water.

In 2025, the Electra prototype aircraft demonstrated takeoff at less than 35 mph combining eight electric motors along the front edge of its wings with large blown flaps at the rear edge.

== STOL military aircraft ==
- Lockheed Martin F-35B Lightning II

5th-generation stealth fighter capable of supersonic speeds and short takeoff/vertical landing, often operating from smaller amphibious assault ships.

- Harrier Jump Jet (AV-8B)

Historically significant V/STOL aircraft capable of short takeoffs with heavy payloads, or vertical landing.

- Boeing C-17 Globemaster III

Large military transport aircraft that can operate from runways as short as 3,500 feet.

- Airbus C295

Tactical airlifter with outstanding short-takeoff performance from unpaved, soft, or sandy surfaces.

- General Atomics Mojave

Unmanned, remotely piloted aircraft (drone) with Short Takeoff and Landing capabilities, designed for expeditionary roles.

== Kits ==
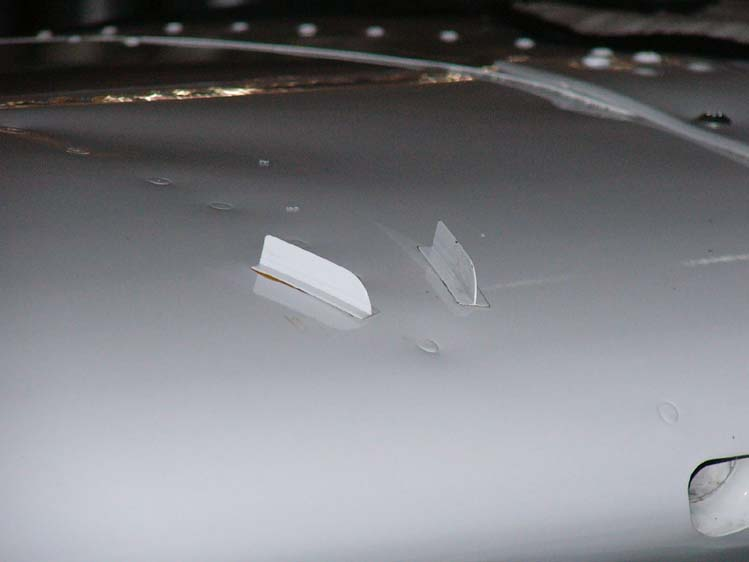
Micro Dynamics vortex generators mounted on the wing of a Cessna 182K

A number of aircraft modification companies offer STOL kits for improving short-field performance.

- Crosswinds STOL of Wasilla, Alaska, sells STOL kits for light aircraft, including leading edge cuffs, tip spill plates, inboard flap extensions and STOL fences. The company offers kits for Piper PA-12, PA-14, PA-18, PA-20 and 22, Bellanca Champion Model 7 series, Cessna 170B, 180 and 185.
- Horton, Inc, of Wellington, Kansas, offers STOL kits under the brand name Horton STOL-Craft, emphasizing that the modifications increase safety by allowing forced landings to occur at lower speeds and thus improve survivability. The Horton modifications include a drooped leading edge cuff, conical cambered wingtips, control surface gap seals and wing fences. The company says: "On an average you can expect to get a 4-7 knot reduction in stall speeds. Flying at these lower stall speeds you can reduce the take-off and landing distances by 10%". Horton STOL kits are available for several Cessna and Piper PA-28 models.
- Micro AeroDynamics markets vortex generator modification kits for "STOL benefits". The Micro kits are small vortex generators that are glued to the wing leading edge, as well as the underside of the elevator and on the fin. Kits are available for a large number of light aircraft types.
- Sierra Industries sells Robertson STOL kits, marketed under the name R/STOL, incorporate a drooped leading edge cuff, wing fences, drooping ailerons and an automatic trim system. The company says that installation "allows 15 to 25 MPH slower approaches and requires up to 40% less runway distance". R/STOL kits are available for various Cessna models.
- Stolairus Aviation of Kelowna, British Columbia, has developed STOL Kits for the de Havilland Canada DHC-2 Beaver and de Havilland Canada DHC-3 Otter to increase lift and reduce stall speeds. The DHC-2 Beaver STOL Kit includes a contoured leading edge, flap-gap seals, wing fences and drooped wingtips. The DHC-3 Otter STOL Kit includes a contoured leading edge and drooped wingtips.

== STOLport ==
A STOLport or STOLPORT is an airport designed with STOL (Short Take-Off and Landing) operations in mind, for aircraft capable of taking off and landing on short runways.

A STOLport usually has a short single runway, generally shorter than 1,500 m (5,000 ft). STOLports are only practicable by certain types of aircraft, especially smaller propeller aircraft, with performances that are compatible with the shorter runway length, steeper approach/departure paths, etc. at individual STOLports.

In the United States, short runway facilities are simply known as airports, and the term "STOLport" has not been commonly used since the early 1970s.

== CESTOL ==
Cruise-efficient short takeoff and landing (CESTOL) have very short runway requirements and cruise speeds greater than Mach 0.8.

== Definitions ==
Many definitions of STOL have been used over time and for regulatory and military purposes. These include:

(DOD/NATO) The ability of an aircraft to clear a 50-foot (15 meters) obstacle within 1,500 feet (450 meters) of commencing takeoff or in landing, to stop within 1,500 feet (450 meters) after passing over a 50-foot (15 meters) obstacle.

— Department of Defense Dictionary of Military and Associated Terms (JP 1-02)

the ability of aircraft to take off and clear a 50-foot obstruction in a distance of 1,500 feet from beginning the takeoff run. It must also be able to stop within 1,500 feet after crossing a 50-foot obstacle on landing.

— Dictionary of Aeronautical Terms

An aircraft that, at some weight within its approved operating weight, is capable of operating from a STOL runway in compliance with the applicable STOL characteristics and airworthiness, operations, noise, and pollution standards" and ""aircraft" means any machine capable of deriving support in the atmosphere

— Transport Canada and Arizona Department of Transportation

an aircraft with a certified performance capability to execute approaches along a glideslope of 6 degrees or steeper and to execute missed approaches at a climb gradient sufficient to clear a 15:1 missed approach surface at sea level... A STOL runway is one which is specifically designated and marked for STOL aircraft operations, and designed and maintained to specified standards.

— US Federal Aviation Administration

Heavier-than-air craft that cannot take off and land vertically, but can operate within areas substantially more confined than those normally required by aircraft of the same size. Derived from short takeoff and landing aircraft.

— McGraw-Hill Dictionary of Scientific & Technical Terms

heavier-than-air craft, capable of rising from and descending to the ground with only a short length of runway, but incapable of doing so vertically. The precise definition of an STOL aircraft has not been universally agreed upon. However, it has been tentatively defined as an aircraft that upon taking off needs only 1,000 ft (305 m) of runway to clear a 50-ft (15-m) obstacle at the end of that distance and upon landing can clear the same obstacle and then land within 1,000 ft.

— Columbia Encyclopedia

The STOL mode of flight is one during which an airplane taking off or landing is operated at climb-out and approach speeds lower than the conventionally accepted margins of airspeed above the power-off stalling speed of the airplane.

— Lieutenant Colonel Walter P. Maiersperger, USAF (Ret)

Some manufacturers market their products as STOL without specifying that the aircraft meets an accepted functional definition.

== See also ==
- List of STOL aircraft
- ESTOLAS
- VTOL
