= Airship hangar =

Large buildings used for sheltering airships

Airship hangars (also known as airship sheds) are large specialized buildings that are used for sheltering airships during construction, maintenance and storage. Rigid airships always needed to be based in airship hangars because weathering was a serious risk.

== History ==
=== Early hangars ===
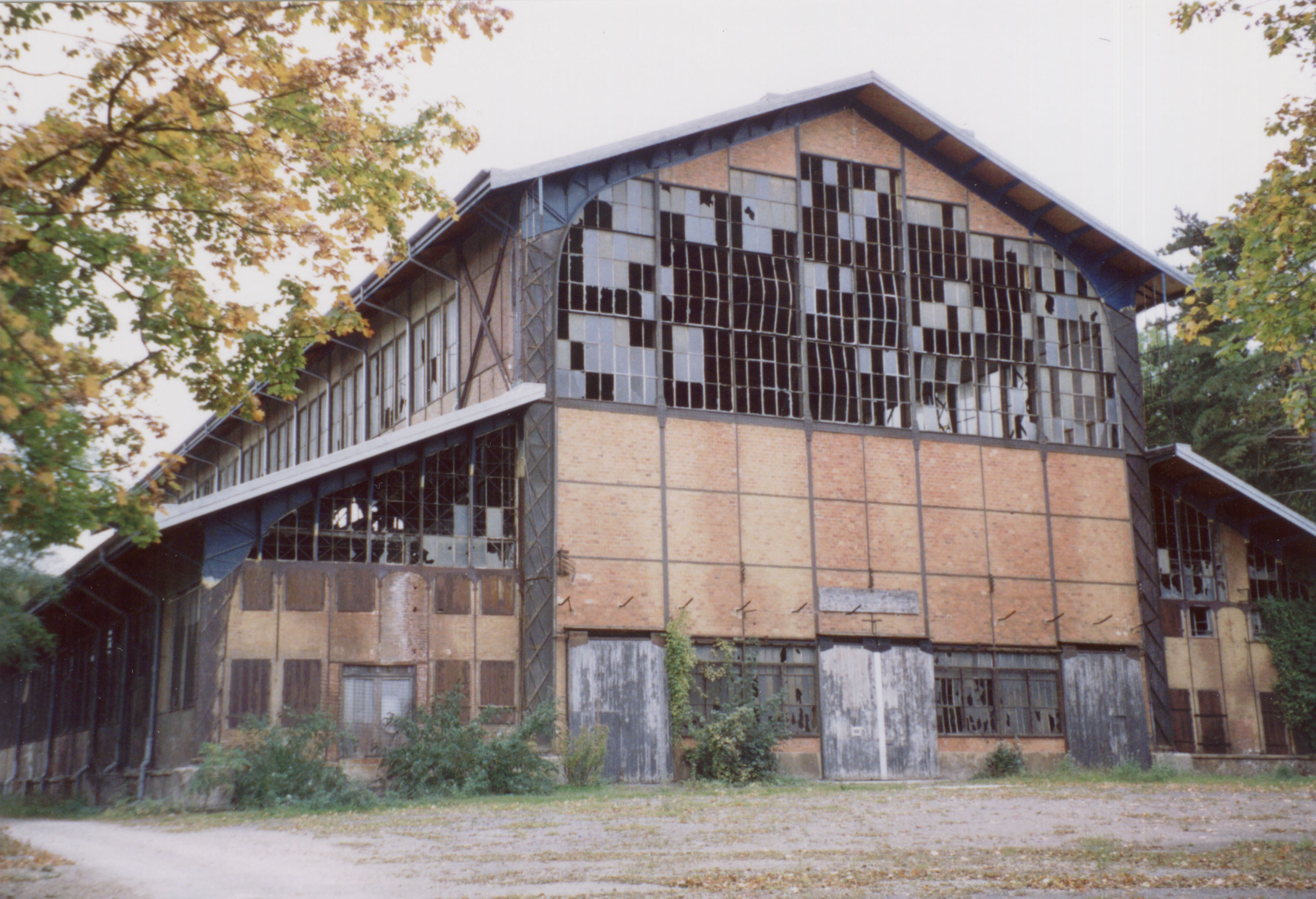
Hangar Y, Chalais-Meudon near Paris, France 2002

The first real airship hangar was built as Hangar "Y" at Chalais-Meudon near Paris in 1879 where the engineers Charles Renard and Arthur Constantin Krebs constructed their first airship "La France". Hangar "Y" is one of the few remaining airship hangars in Europe.

The construction of the first operational rigid airship LZ1 by Count Ferdinand von Zeppelin started in 1899 in a floating hangar on Lake Constance at Manzell today part of Friedrichshafen. The floating hangar turned into the direction of the wind on its own and so it was easier to move the airship into the hangar exactly against the wind.

For the same reason later rotating hangars were built at Biesdorf (today part of Berlin) and at the Nordholz Airbase, to the south of Cuxhaven in Germany. Already before the First World War there were transportable tent constructions as hangars for smaller airships. They were quite common in the US at fairgrounds or exhibitions. The American Melvin Vaniman constructed big tent hangars in France particularly for the French army.

=== The Zeppelin programme ===
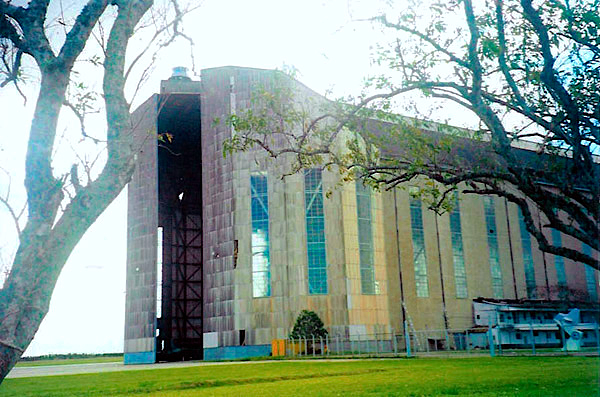
Zeppelin Hangar, Bartolomeu de Gusmão Airport, Santa Cruz, Rio de Janeiro, Brazil

With the construction of Zeppelin LZ1 the era of big rigid airships started in Germany and for this very big airship hangars were necessary. This development started at the Zeppelin plant in Friedrichshafen before the First World War, continued through the war with dozens of hangars for construction of big rigid airships and their operation all over Germany and the occupied territories. In the 1920s and 30s even bigger hangars for the new Hindenburg-class airships were built at Friedrichshafen, Frankfurt, and at Bartolomeu de Gusmão Airport in Santa Cruz, Rio de Janeiro, Brazil, the only Zeppelin airship hangar of all those built which still exists

=== UK airship construction ===
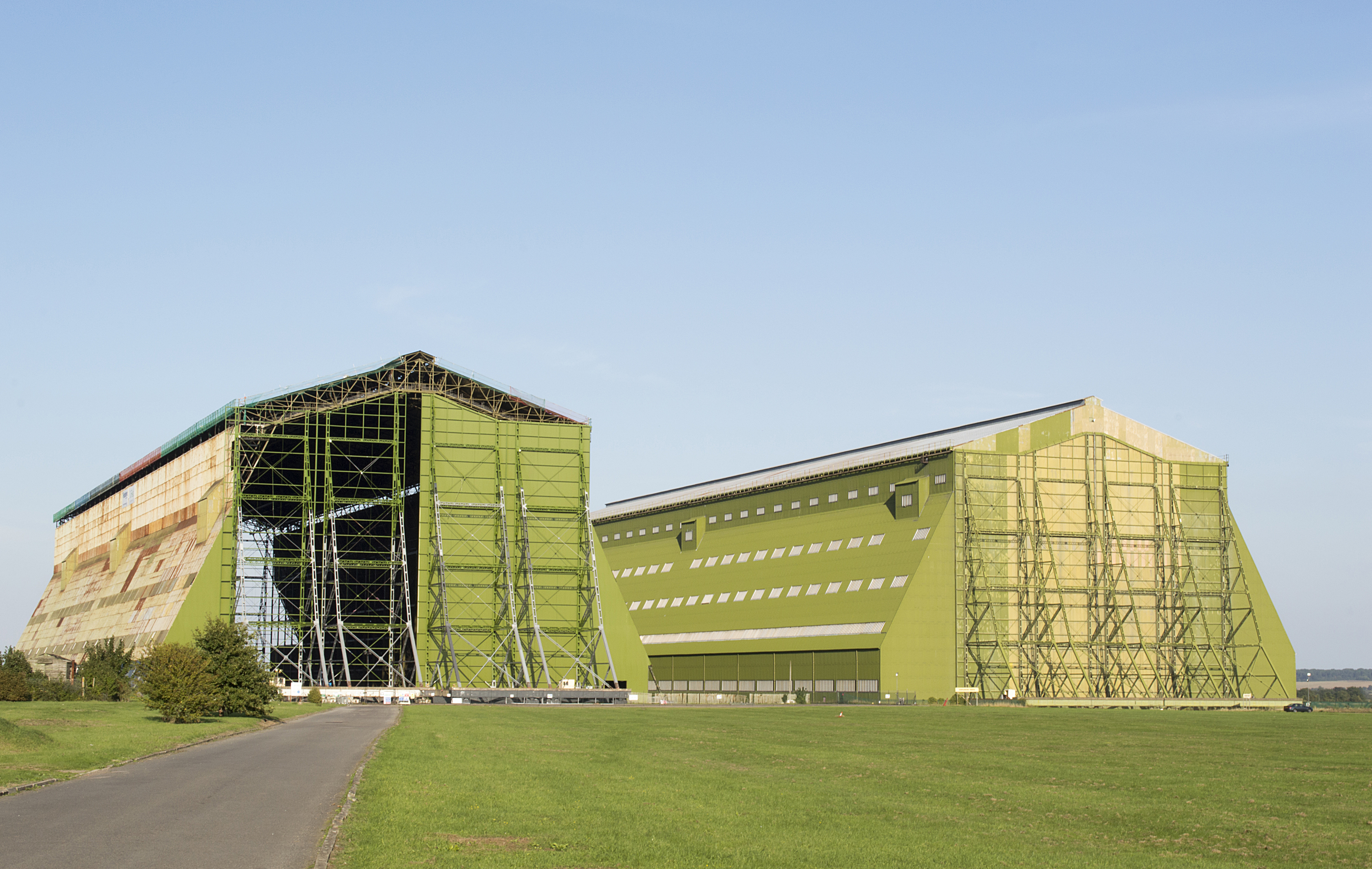
Hangars of the former Royal Airship Works at Cardington, Bedfordshire, England, 2013

There was also an airship program in the UK. This required the big construction sheds in Barrow-in-Furness, Inchinnan, Barlow and Cardington, and the rigid airship war stations at Longside, East Fortune, Howden, Pulham (Norfolk) and Kingsnorth.

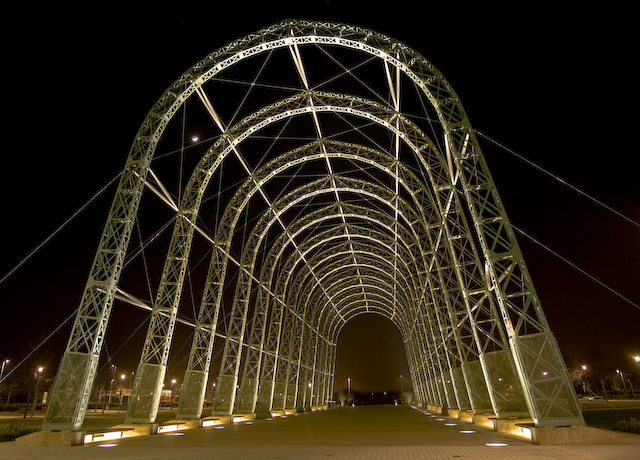
The reconstructed Airship Hangar at Farnborough

Today, only the two hangars of the former Royal Airship Works in Cardington, Bedfordshire, where the R101 was built, remain. The No.1 Cardington hangar is original, but extended; the No.2 hangar was relocated to Cardington from Pulham in 1928.

In 1924, the Imperial Airship Communications scheme planned to extend mail and passenger service to British India, so an 859-foot hangar was constructed at Karachi (now in Pakistan) in 1929. This was the intended destination of the R101.

=== France ===
In France few big hangars had been built, because there was only one attempt to build a rigid airship. Nevertheless, at the end of the First World War an airship station for rigid airships was built in Cuers-Pierrefeu by adding the parts of smaller hangars to two big ones.

At Paris-Orly Airport two concrete hangars were built between 1923 and 1926. Planned by the engineer Eugene Freyssinet, the 300 metre-long buildings were an important innovation according to the construction and aesthetic of the design. None of the big French hangars exist anymore, while a few smaller ones still are there (see Ecausseville, Calvados for a surviving example).

=== United States ===
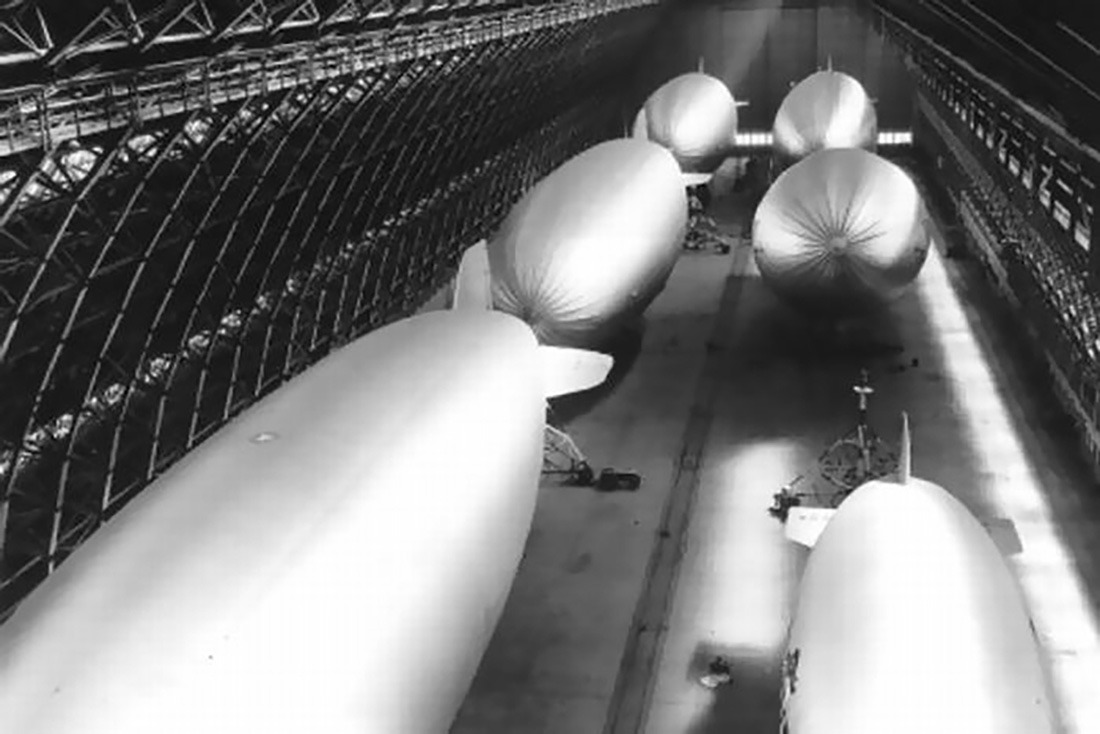
A view of six US Navy blimps in one of the two hangars located at NAS Santa Ana, California

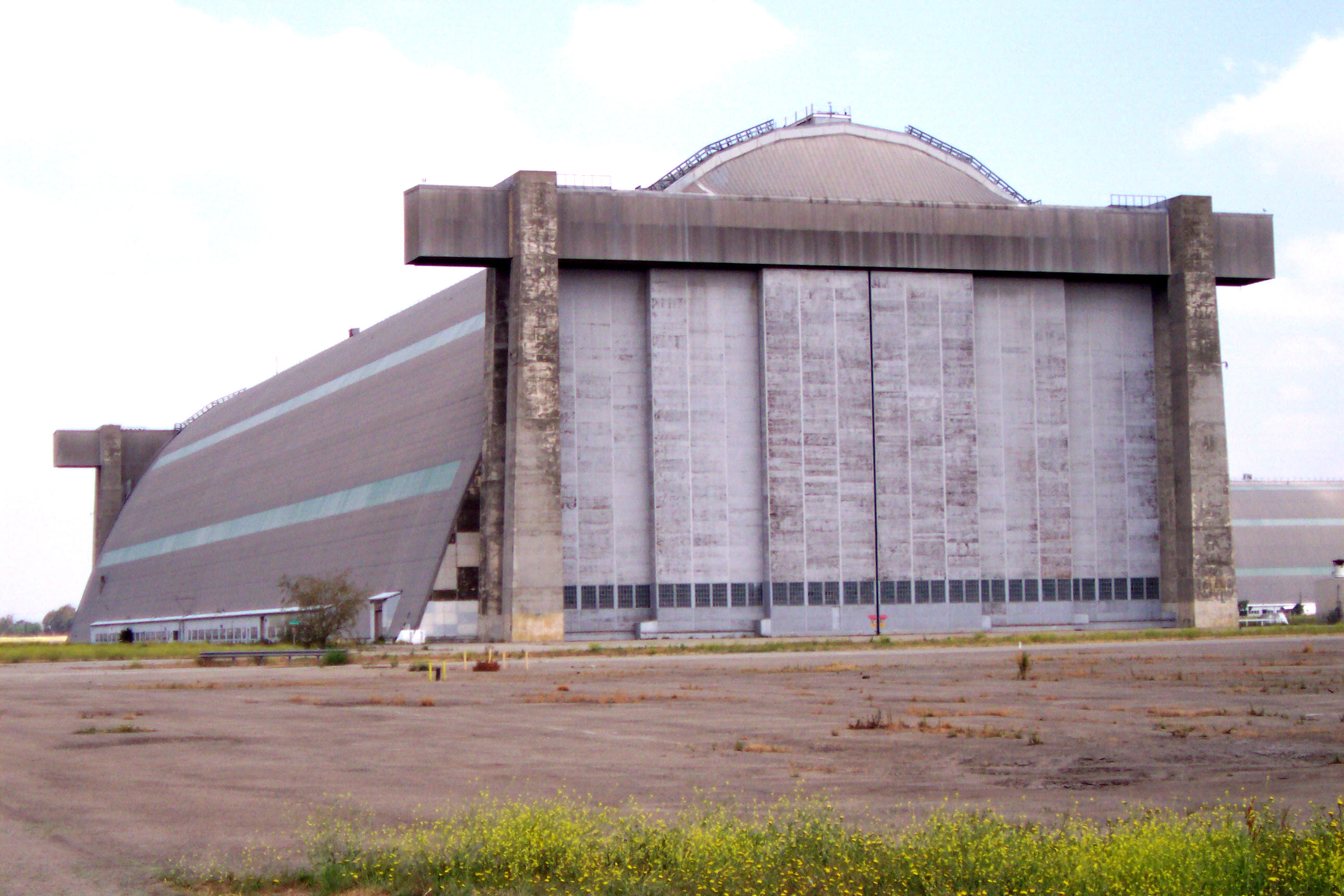
Hangar No. 2 at the former Marine Corps Air Station Tustin

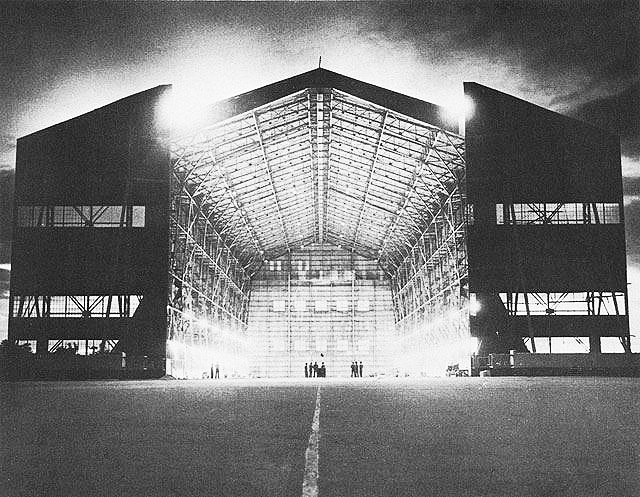
LTA Hangar built by African American Seabees of the 80th Naval Construction Battalion at Carlsen Field Trinidad, B.W.I. for ZP-51 of Fleet Airship Wing 5 in 1943

In the United States the Navy began producing non-rigid airships during World War I. The Wingfoot Lake Airship Hangar in Suffield, Ohio was constructed in 1917 by the Goodyear Tire and Rubber Company for the production of non-rigid airships and training. Hangar No 1 at Lakehurst Naval Airship Station was built in 1921 to house the Navy's future rigid airships. Additional hangars, which housed the USS Akron (ZRS-4) and USS Macon (ZRS-5), exist in Akron, Ohio (the Goodyear Airdock, 1929) and Sunnyvale, California (Hangar One, Moffett Federal Airfield, 1932). The ships were constructed in Akron. The Akron was based in Lakehurst while the Macon was based at Moffett Field. During World War II, seventeen large hangars were built to house US Navy blimps. Today, five of these wooden hangars still exist: Moffett Field (1), Tustin, California (1), Tillamook, Oregon (1), Lakehurst, New Jersey (2).

=== Post World War hangars ===
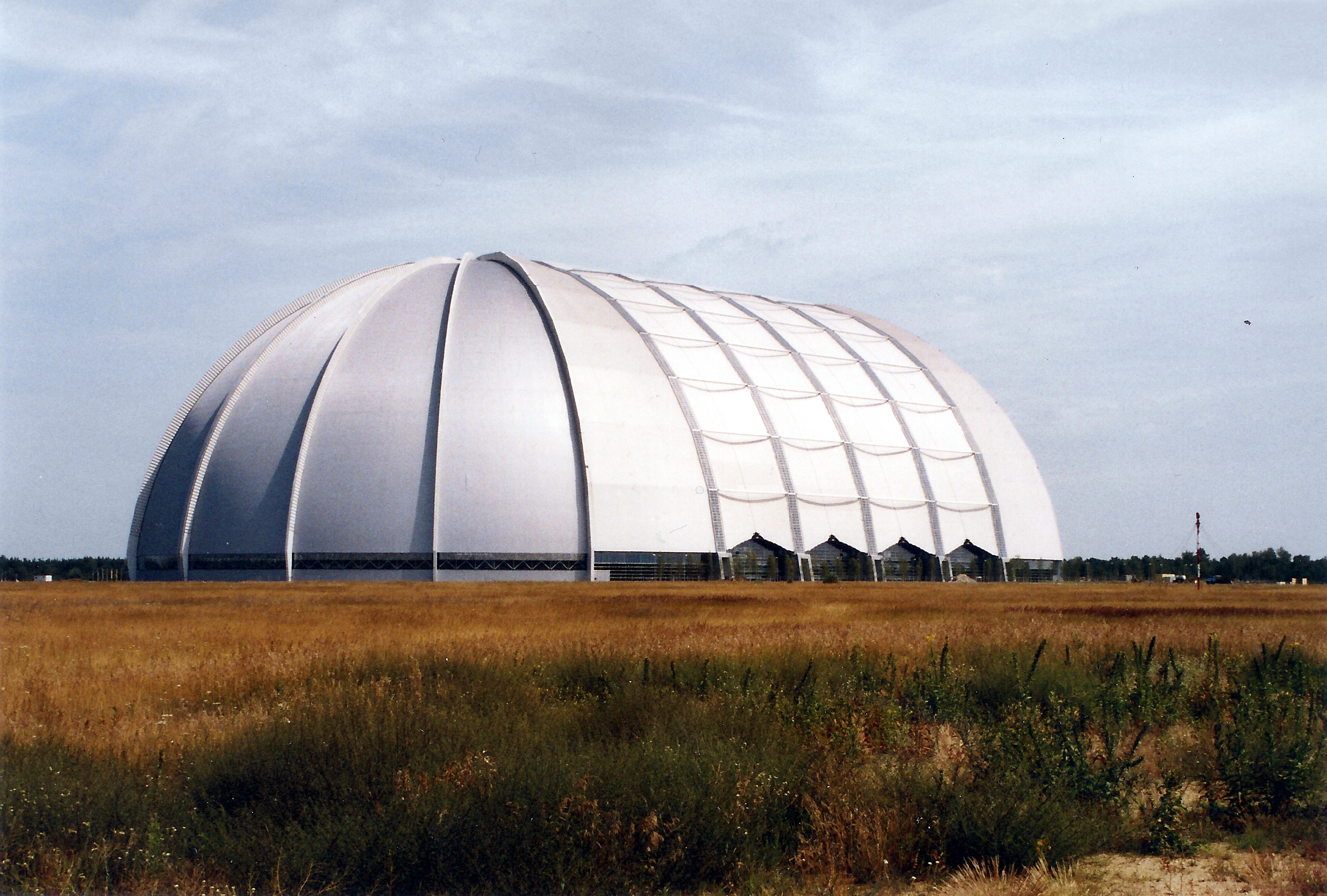
Exterior view of hangar at the former Brand-Briesen Airfield, built for Cargolifter

Worldwide, only one big airship shed has been built since the Second World War: the one in Brand, south of Berlin, for the construction of the Cargolifter AG airship. With a length of 360 metres (1,180 ft), a width of 210 metres (690 ft) and a height of 107 metres (351 ft), it is one of the largest structures in the world without interior support structures. After the bankruptcy of Cargolifter AG it was converted into a leisure center, Tropical Islands.

For the needs of the rather small blimps quite a number of mostly simple hangars exist around the world today.
