= Pasternak =

- Language: Slavic

Origin
- Meaning: Parsnip

Other names
- Variant form: Pasternack

Pasternak, Pasternack (Cyrillic: Пастернак, Russian pronunciation: [pəstʲɪrˈnak]) (Hungarian: Paszternák, Romanian: Păstârnac, and other cognates) means parsnip, Pastinaca sativa, in Polish, Romanian, Russian, Ukrainian, Belarusian, Hungarian, and Yiddish. Notable people with the last name "Pasternak" include:

== Pasternak/Pasternack ==
- Anne Pasternak (born 1964), American art critic
- Ben Pasternak (born 1999), Australian co-founder and CEO of Monkey Inc.
- Boris Pasternak (1890–1960), Russian/Soviet poet and novelist
- Bruce Pasternack (1947–2021), American corporate executive
- Carol Braun Pasternack, American scholar of English medieval literature and language
- David Pasternack
- Harley Pasternak (born 1974), Canadian-American personal trainer
- Igor Pasternak, Soviet-born US airship designer, founder and CEO of Worldwide Aeros Corp.
- James Pasternak, Canadian politician
- Joe Pasternack (born 1977), American college basketball coach
- Joseph "Joe" Pasternak (1901–1991), Hungarian-US film producer
- Josef Pasternack (1881–1940), Polish conductor and composer
- Kenneth Pasternak (born 1954), American businessman
- Leon Pasternak (1910–1969), Polish poet and satirist
- Leonid Pasternak (1862–1945), Russian painter, father of Boris Pasternak
- Marco Pasternak, character in Better Call Saul
- Michael Joseph Pasternak, known as Emperor Rosko (born 1942), American pop music presenter
- Nadja Pasternack (born 1996), Swiss bobsledder
- Natalia Pasternak Taschner, Brazilian microbiologist
- Peter Pasternack
- Reagan Pasternak (born 1977), Canadian actress and singer
- Robert Pasternack, American politician
- Simon Pasternack (1914–1976), physicist and editor
- Simon Pasternak (born 1971), Danish author
- Velvel Pasternak (1933–2019), Canadian-American Jewish ethnomusicologist

== Other variants ==
- Andreea Păstârnac, Romanian diplomat, ambasador to Israel
- David Pastrňák (born 1996), Czech ice hockey player

== Fictional characters ==
- Gabriel Pasternak, character and eponymous episode in the Argentinian film Wild Tales
- Ilya Pasternak, character in Ace Combat 6: Fires of Liberation
