= Dragon Dream =

Airship

- Dragon Dream experimental cargo air ship

General information
- Type: ML866
- National origin: United States
- Manufacturer: Worldwide Aeros Corp
- Designer: Igor Pasternak
- Construction number: 0023
- Registration: N866ML

Dragon Dream (FAA registration: N866ML) is an experimental lighter than air (LTA) cargo rigid airship built by Worldwide Aeros Corp as a half-scale proof of concept prototype for a design which the manufacturer calls the "Aeroscraft". The development and design has been funded by the US government through the military Walrus HULA and then the "Pelican" projects.

== Design ==
The hull of the Dragon Dream has a flattened elliptic cross-section.

Buoyancy control is managed by pumping helium gas from the internal gas bag and compressing it into a storage cell, the reduction in lifting volume leading to a loss of buoyancy. The system can vary the airship's lift by 3,000–4,000 lb. The manufacturer uses the phrase "Control Of Static Heaviness" for this technology.

Specifications

Data from Aviation Week; FAA Registration

General characteristics

- Capacity: 6
- Length: 266 ft 0 in (81 m)
- Volume: 600,000 cu ft (17,000 m^{3})
- Gross weight: 36,000 lb (16,329 kg)
- Powerplant: 3 × Lycoming AEIO-540 SER Reciprocating diesel, 260 hp (190 kW) each

== Operational history ==
The airship was completed in 2013 and, after extensive systems tests in the construction hangar at MCAS Tustin, was granted an airworthiness certificate by the US Federal Aviation Administration in September 2013, following which some outdoor tethered trials were carried out. Shortly afterwards it was badly damaged when part of the hangar roof collapsed, and the company sued the US Navy for $65 million in 2015.
