= Aeros Corporation =

American aircraft company

- Type: Airship Manufacturer, Airship Logistics Service Provider
- Industry: Aerospace, Aviation, Defense and Advanced Technologies, Air Logistics
- Founded: 1987; 39 years ago
- Founder: Igor Pasternak (Chairman, President & CEO)
- Headquarters: Los Angeles, California, USA
- Area served: Worldwide
- Key people: Igor Pasternak
- Products: Aeroscraft, Sky Dragon Airship, Tactical Aerostats, Early Warning System
- Divisions: Aeroscraft Corporation North American Defense Advanced Technology Solutions (NADATS)
- Website: www.aeroscraft.com

Aeros Corp is an American manufacturer of airships based in Los Angeles, California. It was founded in 1987 by the current CEO and chief engineer, Igor Pasternak, who was born in Soviet Kazakhstan, raised in Soviet Ukraine, and moved to the U.S. after the Soviet collapse to build airships there.

The company's current products are non-rigids aimed at both the military and commercial markets, including transport, surveillance, broadcasting and advertising. The company's best-selling ship is called the Sky Dragon.

The company is also developing an Aeroscraft, a rigid airship with a number of innovative features, the most important of which is a method of controlling the airship's static lift, which can be reduced by pumping helium from the internal gasbags and storing it under pressure: conversely lift can be increased by re-inflating the gasbags using the stored gas. The company has received $60 million from the U.S. Department of Defense to develop the concept, resulting in a prototype named Dragon Dream which underwent systems tests and flight demonstrations in late 2013. This prototype was subsequently damaged when part of the roof of the hangar at the former Marine Corps Air Station in Tustin, in which it was constructed, collapsed on 7 October 2013.

== History ==
In 1981, Igor Pasternak founded a design bureau at Lviv Polytechnic University. He started a private company in 1986 producing tethered balloons for advertising. It moved to the United States in 1994.

After 9/11, the company shifted its focus from advertising to surveillance, as its large ships can hold 1,000 pounds (450 kg) of radar-surveillance equipment. The blimps have such varied uses as monitoring oil pipelines in Mexico to performing surveillance for the Ukrainian government along the Russian border.

In 2005, Aeros was granted the largest contract under DARPA's project Walrus HULA. Project Walrus was not renewed in 2010. However, the Pentagon continued to fund Aeros through the Rapid Reaction Technology Office, contracting with them in 2010 to build a prototype that could demonstrate key technologies.

The Pentagon has provided US$60 million in funding for the development of the "Pelican" prototype.

== Aeroscraft ==
The Aeroscraft is a planned heavy-lift, variable-buoyancy cargo airship featuring an onboard buoyancy management system, rigid structure, vertical takeoff and landing performance, and operational abilities at low speed, in hover, and from unprepared surfaces. It has a number of innovative features, the most important of which is a method of controlling the airship's static lift, which can be reduced by pumping helium from the internal gasbags and storing it under pressure: conversely, lift can be increased by reinflating the gasbags using the stored gas.

=== Project Pelican and Dragon Dream ===
Project Pelican was a US government-funded project to build and test a half-scale prototype of the proposed full-size Aeroscraft, using representative structure and avionics. The airship measures 266 feet (81 m) and design speed of 60 knots (110 km/h; 69 mph) The company received US$60 million from the U.S. Department of Defense to develop the concept, resulting in a prototype named Dragon Dream, which underwent systems tests and flight demonstrations in late 2013. The first floating took place on January 3, 2013, at the hangar at the former Marine Corps Air Station in Tustin in which it was constructed, where it hovered indoors at a height of 12 feet (3.7 m) for several minutes. The Pentagon has declared that the tests of the Dragon Dream were a "success", with the craft meeting its demonstration objectives. The airship was rolled out of its hangar on July 4, 2013. and performed its first flight on September 11. It was subsequently damaged when part of the roof of the hangar collapsed on it on 7 October 2013. The company sued the Navy for $65 million in 2015 for the collapse. The lawsuit was settled in favor of Aeros with an award of $6,882,918 for damages.

=== Planned full-scale craft ===
The company is beginning production of two examples, an ML866 and an ML868 model. The ML866 model will be 555 feet (169 m) in length, have a payload capacity of 66 tons, a top speed of 120 knots (222 km/h), a range of 3,100 nmi (5,700 km), and an altitude ceiling of 12,000 ft (3,700 m). The larger ML868 model will be 770 feet (230 m) in length and carry 244 tons, with the same speed and altitude ceiling as the ML866.

=== Design ===
The Aeroscraft is a rigid airship, having an internal structure to maintain its shape. It can reach otherwise difficult or inaccessible locations and can hover indefinitely with a full payload on board. The design incorporates cargo bays that are larger than any current air, truck or rail transport, while the payload capacity is significantly more than the current 16-ton maximum for helicopters.

Propulsion is provided by conventional propellers, and in addition the Aeroscraft has six downward-pointing turbofan jet engines that assist in vertical take-off and landing. These turbofans, together with the Aeros "COSH" buoyancy control system, make the Aeroscraft capable of taking off and landing vertically without the need for a runway, a ground crew, or external ballast.

As with any airship, the Aeroscraft may be used to transport cargo to remote or difficult locations and to hover over uneven terrain.

The manufacturer also envisions the delivery of large amounts of commercial merchandise from a centralized location.

== Fleet ==
Aeroscraft Models
	Dragon Dream (Prototype)	ML 806	ML 866	ML 868
Payload	0 tons	6 tons	66 tons	250 tons
Cruise Speeds	n/a	100	120	120
Range	n/a	500	3100	6200
Cargo Compartment	n/a	320 Sq ft	8,800 Sq ft	23,180 Sq ft

== Products ==
- Aeroscraft ML806
- Aeroscraft ML866
- Aeroscraft ML868
- Airborne Fulfillment Center
- 40A Sky Dragon
- 40B Sky Dragon
- 40D Sky Dragon
- Aeros 50
- Sky Crow Tactical Aerostat System

== See also ==
- Cargolifter AG
- ESTOLAS
- P-791
- WALRUS HULA
- LEMV
