= Tropical Islands Resort =

Indoor water park in Brandenburg, Germany

Tropical Islands
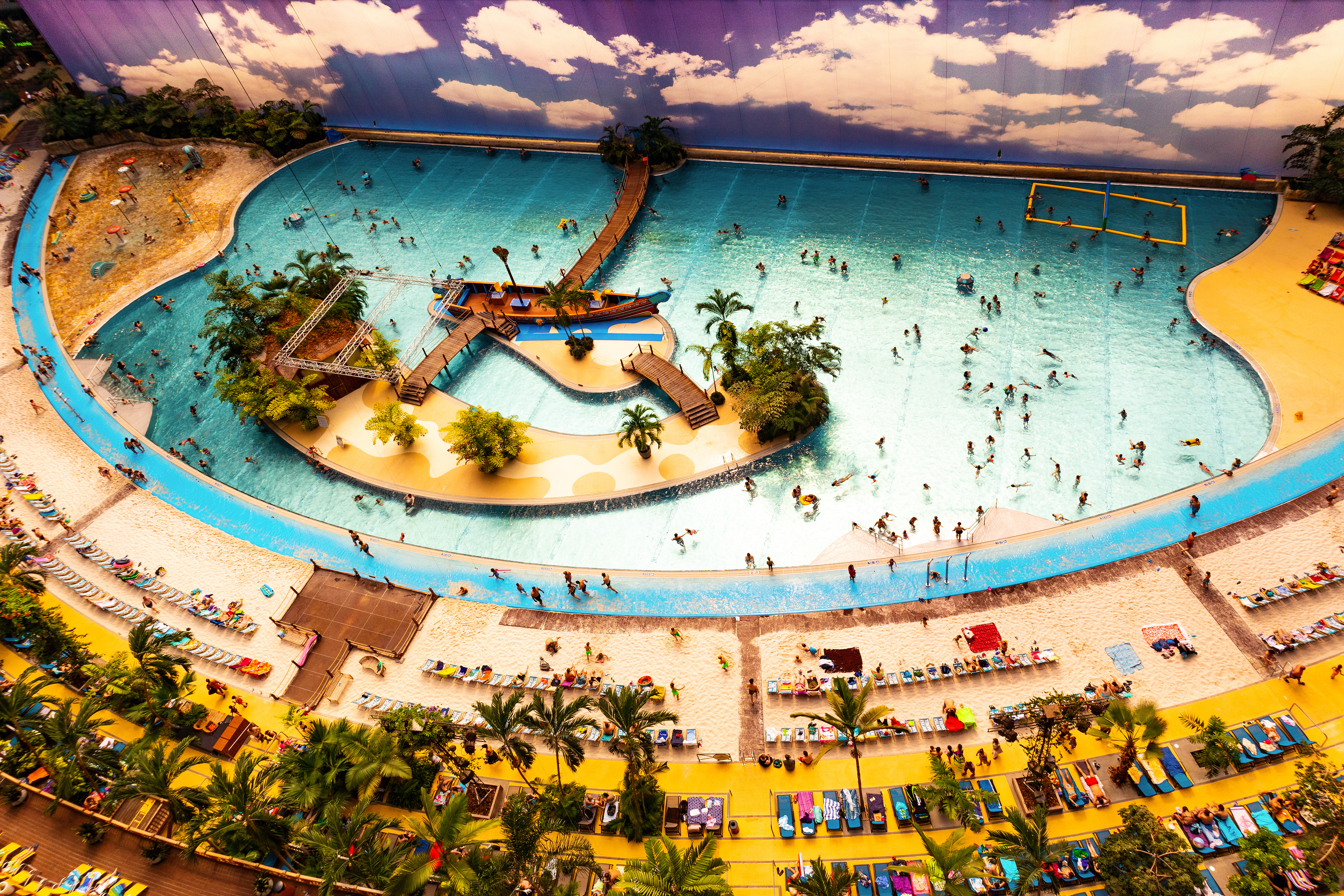
- Tropical Islands Resort inside the dome
- Interactive map of Tropical Islands
- Location: Krausnick, Germany
- Coordinates: 52°02′15″N 13°44′55″E
- Owner: Parques Reunidos
- Opened: 19 December 2004
- Website: tropical-islands.de

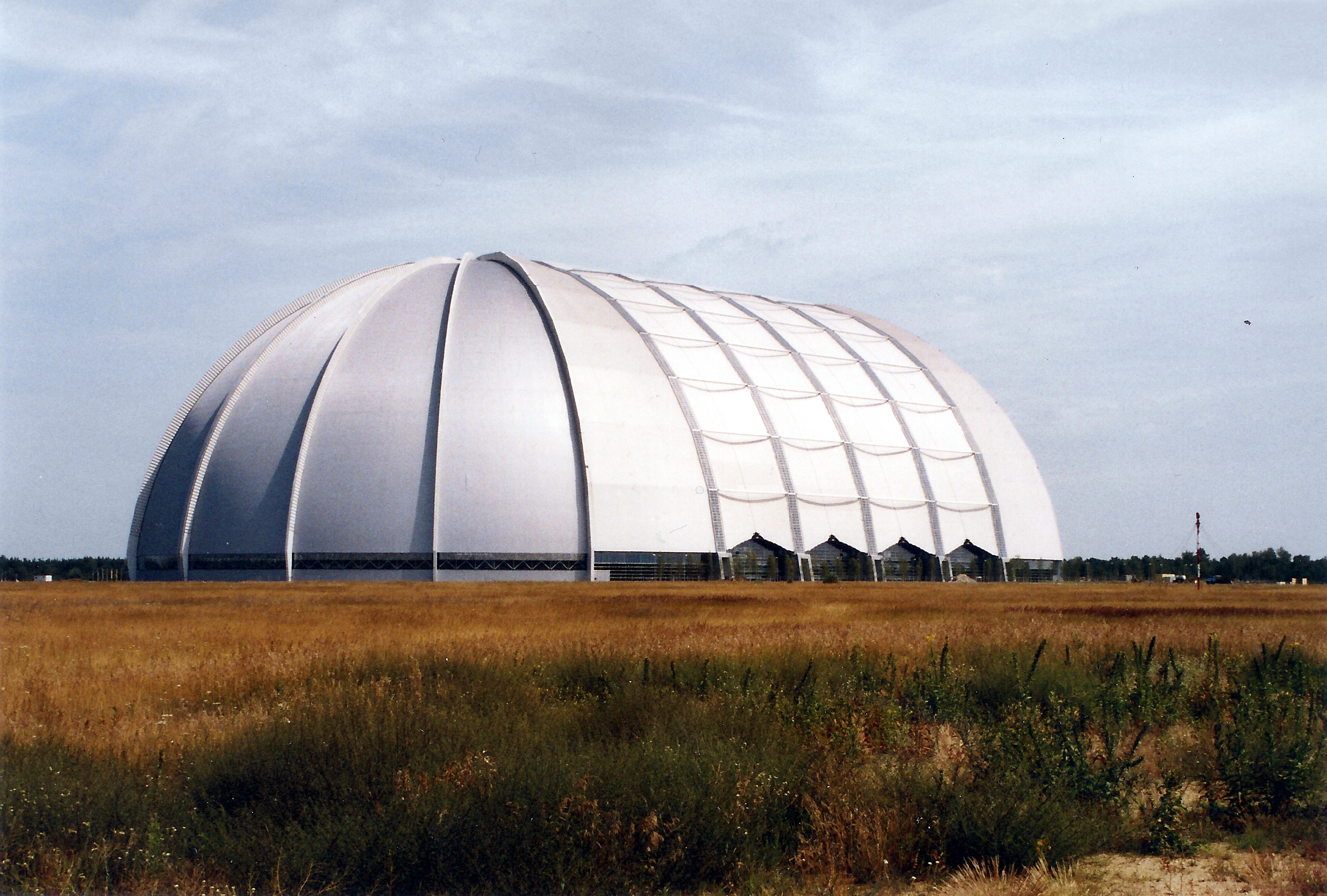
Former airship hangar, now housing the resort

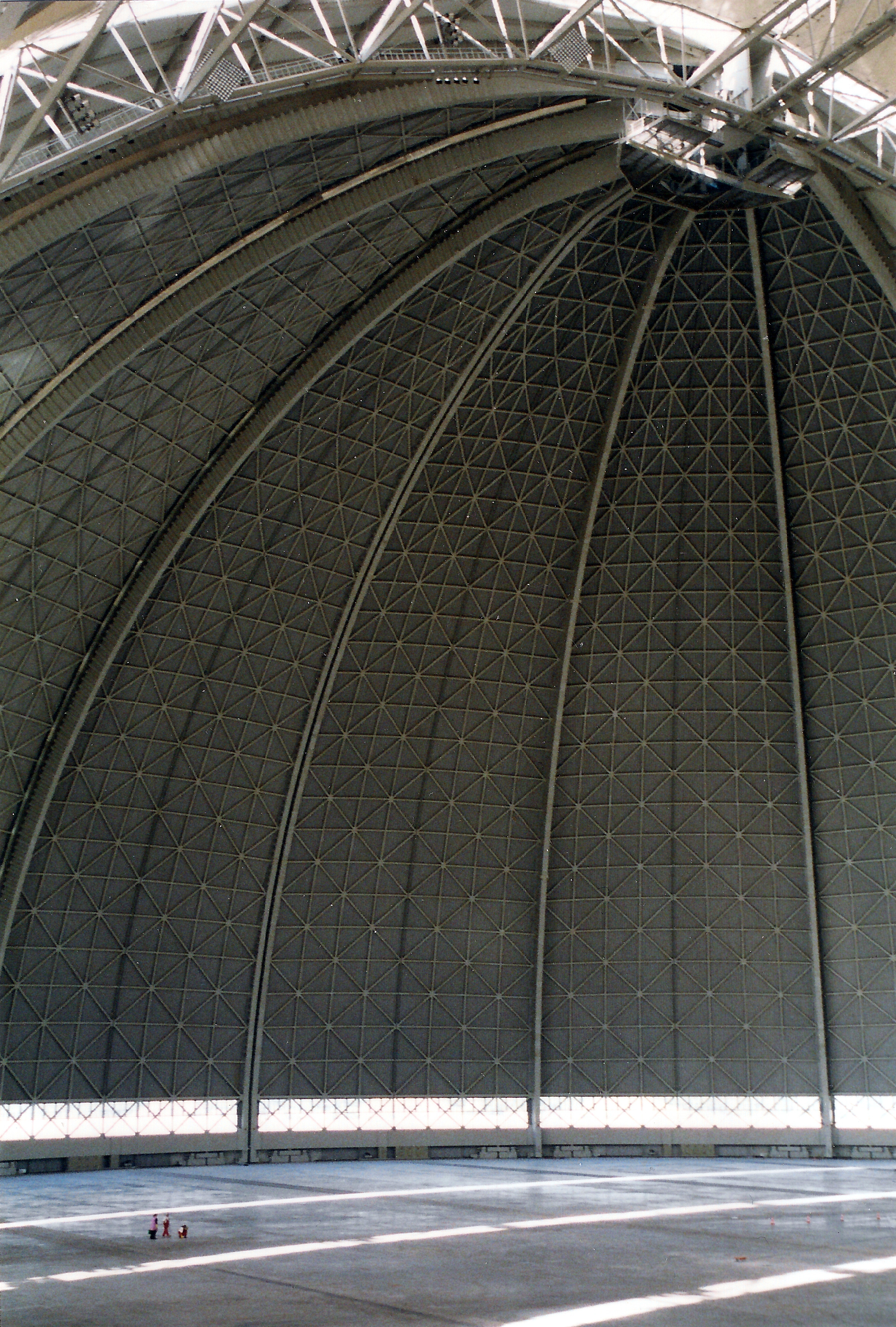
Interior of the hangar. Note people at the lower left for scale

Tropical Islands Resort is a tropical-themed indoor water park located in the former Brand-Briesen Airfield in Halbe, a municipality in the district of Dahme-Spreewald in Brandenburg, Germany, 50 kilometres (31 miles) from the southern boundary of Berlin. It is the largest indoor water park in the world, bigger than Canada's World Waterpark at West Edmonton Mall, and is housed in a former airship hangar (known as the Aerium), which is the biggest free-standing hall in the world and the fourth-largest building in the world by usable volume. The hall belonged to the company Cargolifter until its insolvency in 2002.

Tropical Islands has a maximum capacity of 8,200 visitors per day. Approximately 600 people work at the park. Spanish entertainment group Parques Reunidos acquired Tropical Islands in December 2018.

== Access ==
Tropical Islands can be reached by taking the A13 autobahn, or by taking a train to Brand Tropical Islands station, followed by a free shuttle bus.

== Background ==
In 1938, German Luftwaffe began development of Brand-Briesen Airfield. The Red Army took the site in May 1945 and occupied the site after World War II, adding a second runway and nuclear-resistant command and control facilities for the fighter aircraft regiment.

With the reunification of Germany in 1989/1990, the Soviet Armed Forces agreed to return all military bases by 1994. Fully owned by the Federal Government of Germany since 1992, Cargolifter AG bought the former military airfield to construct airships. It began development of a new construction hall, 360 metres (1,180 feet) long, 210 metres (690 feet) wide and 107 metres (351 feet) high, which cost €78 million. At 5.5 million m^{3} (194 million ft^{3}), it is one of the largest buildings on Earth by volume, and is the world's largest single hall without supporting pillars inside. The hangar was commissioned as an airship hangar named Aerium in November 2000, but the airship it was intended to house – the CL160 – was never built. CargoLifter went bankrupt in mid-2002, at which point usage of the hangar was abandoned even though the site was open for visitors.

== Concept ==
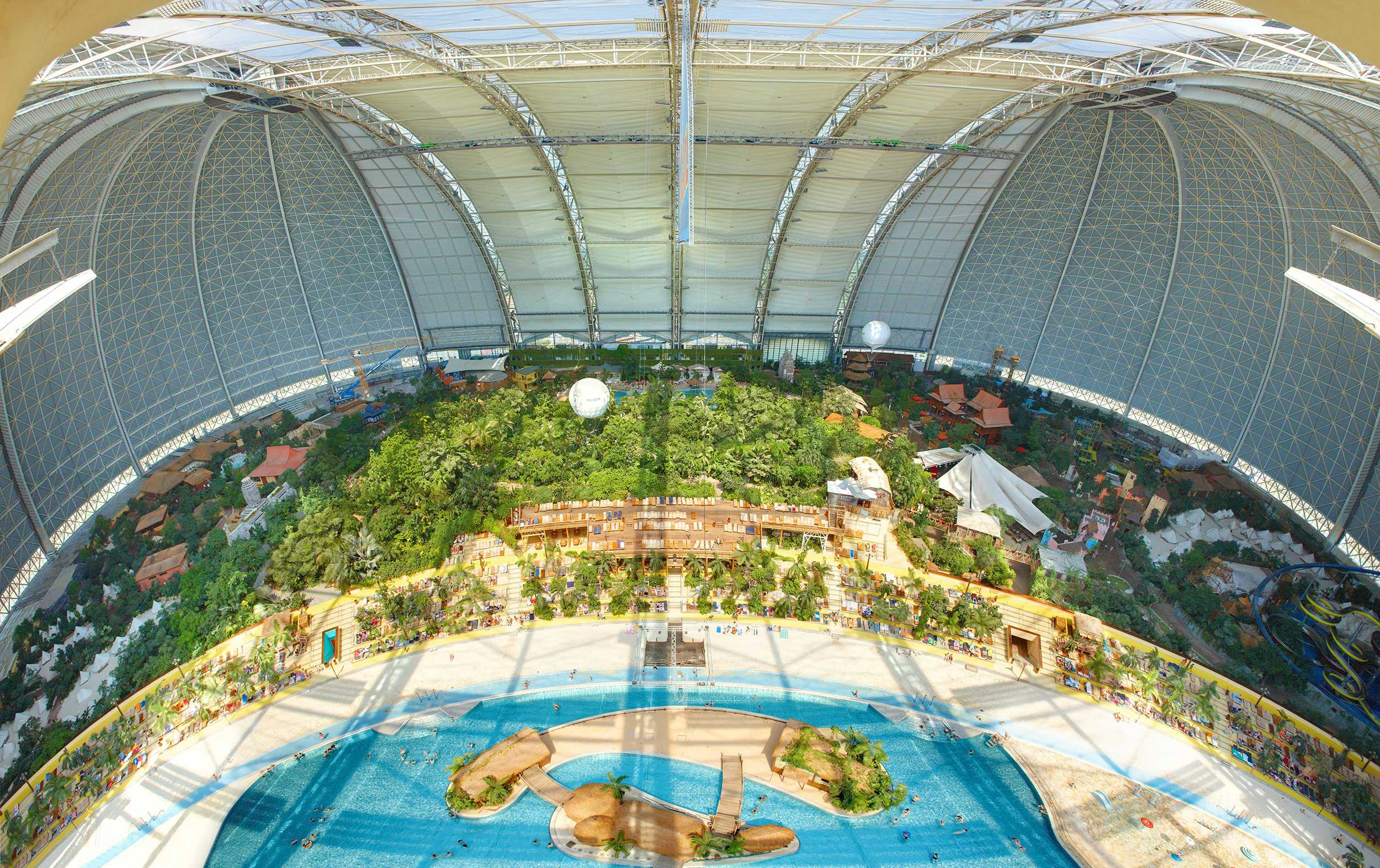
Tropical Islands dome, interior bird's-eye view

The former airship hangar was purchased by the Malaysian corporation Tanjong with plans to renovate it into a theme park resort on 11 June 2003 for €17.5 million, of which €10 million was a subsidy from the state of Brandenburg. The building permit for constructing the theme park inside the hall was granted on 2 February 2004, and Tropical Islands water park officially opened on 19 December 2004.

Inside the hall, the air temperature is maintained at 26 °C (79 °F) and air humidity at approximately 64%. It is open every day of the year.

== Themed areas ==
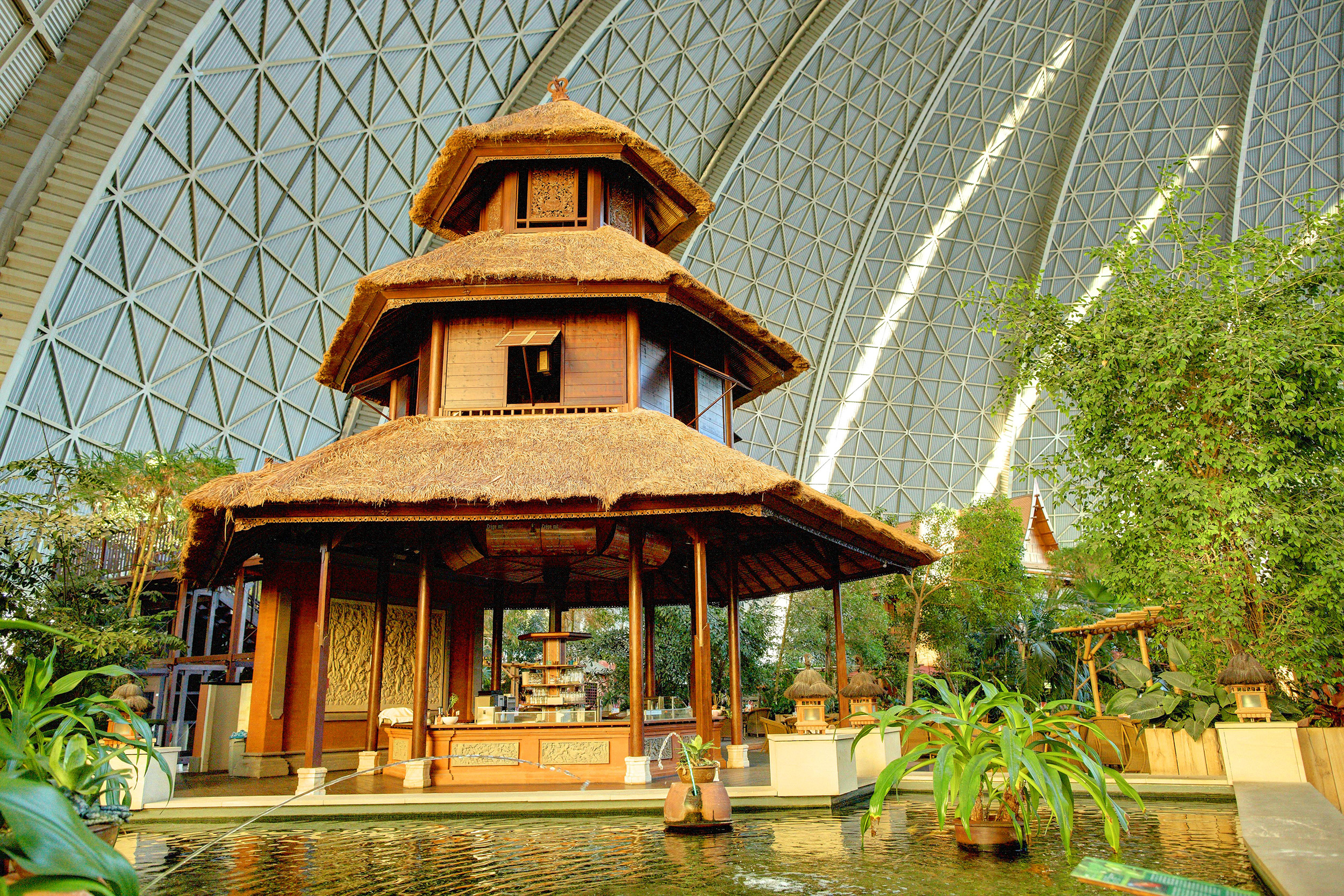
The Bali Pavilion in the Tropical Village

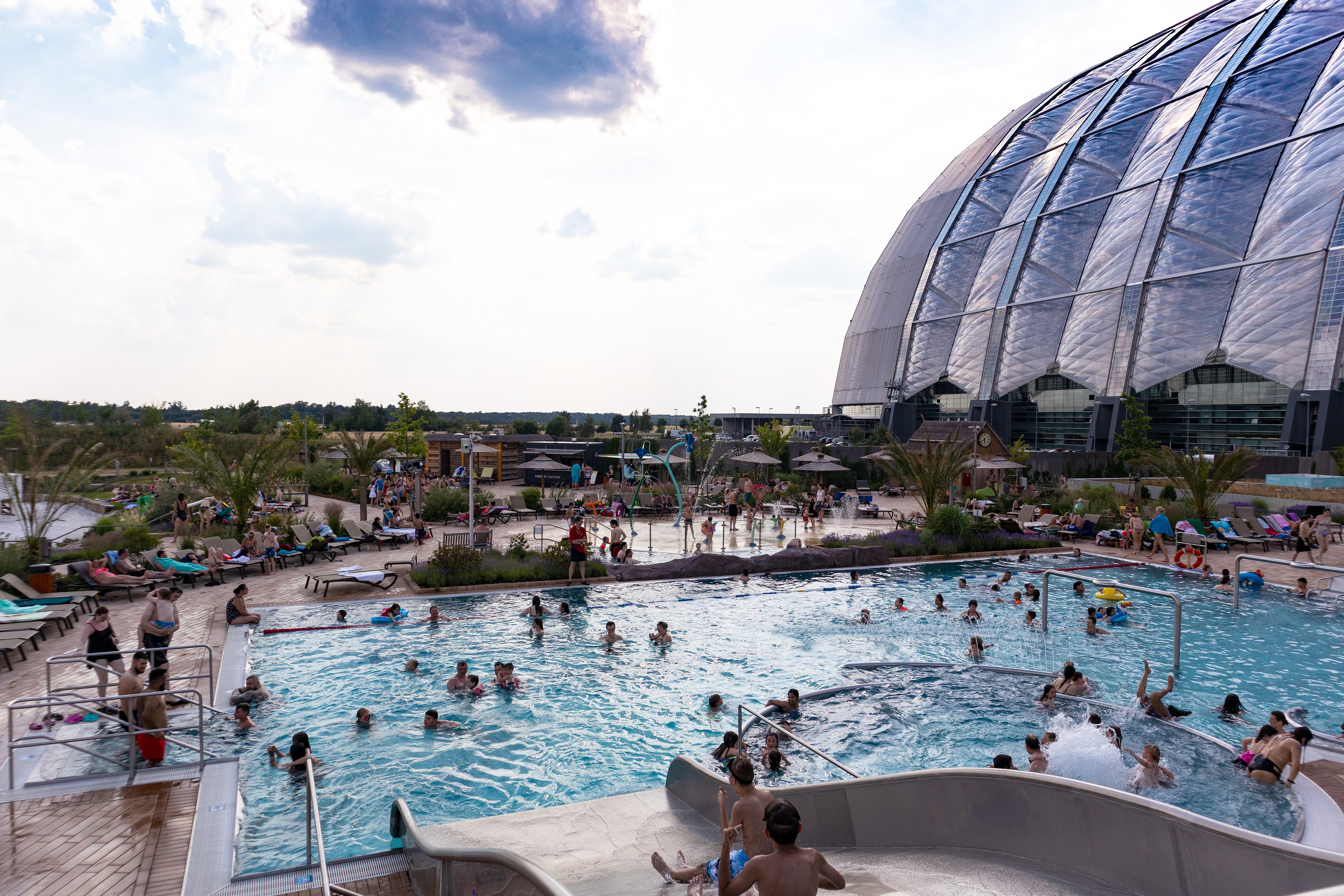
Tropical Islands, outdoor area, The Amazonia

Tropical Islands has a number of different themed areas:

- The Tropical Village, featuring copies of traditional buildings from Thailand, Borneo, Samoa and Bali.
- The Rainforest, with around 50,000 plants and 600 different species, including some rare plants.
- The Tropical Sea, a 140-metre (460 ft) pool with an area of 4,400 square metres (47,000 sq ft) and a depth of 1.35 metres (4 ft 5 in), designed to look like the waters of a coral island, lined by a 200-metre (660 ft) sandy beach.
- The Bali Lagoon, with an area of 1,200 square metres (13,000 sq ft) and a depth of less than 1 metre (3 ft 3 in) in places, with fountains, a current canal, whirlpools and two water slides.
- The Amazonia, an outdoor area of over 35,000 square meters (380,000 square feet) with two large pools, a sunbathing area, a beach volleyball court and beach soccer field, as well as a kiosk.

== Further development ==
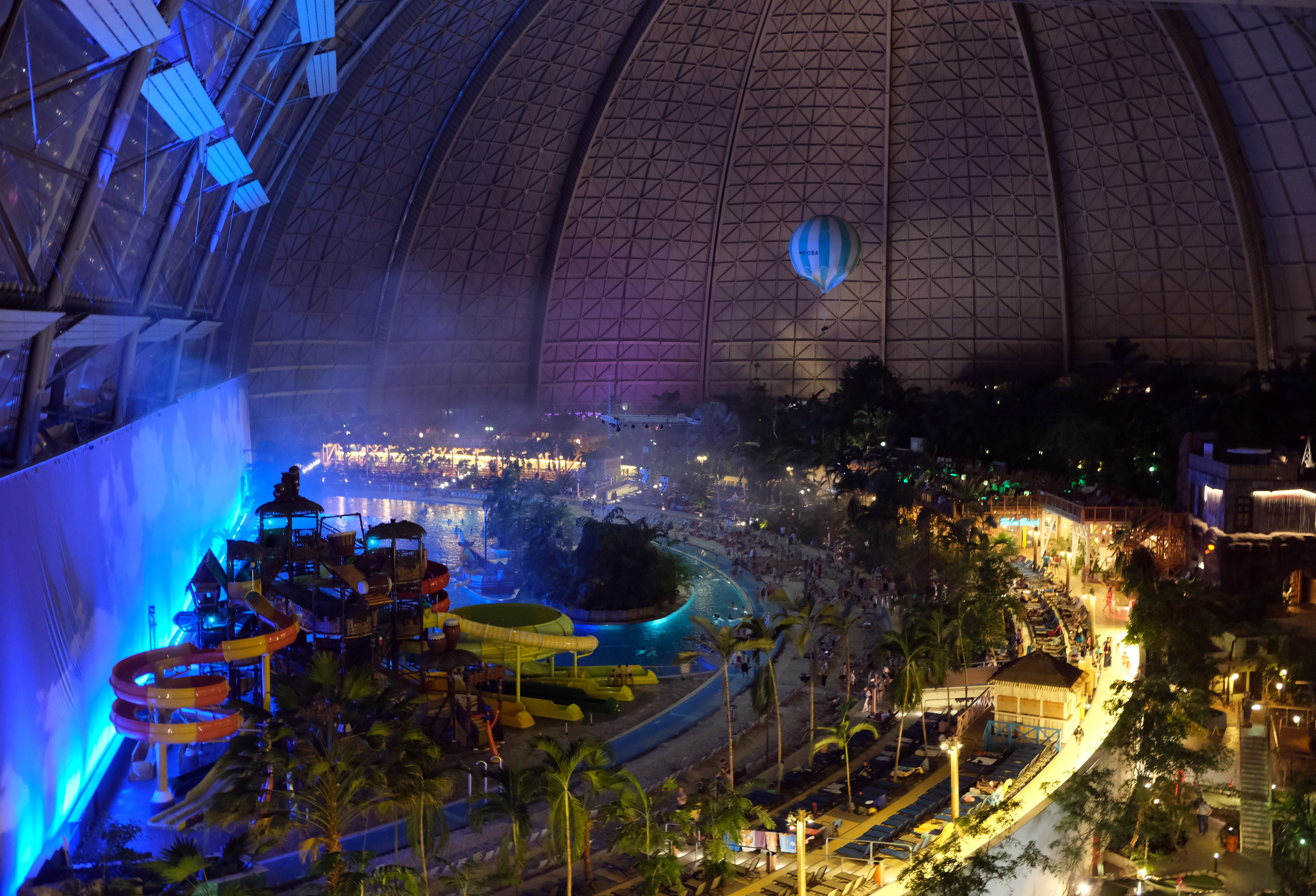
Indoor view from the water slide tower in 2020

A 4,000 m^{2} (43,000 ft^{2}) children's play area opened in 2007. In mid-2007, a sauna and spa facility with six separate areas was added, the largest tropical sauna complex in Europe. The design of the saunas is inspired by UNESCO World Heritage Sites in South-East Asia, including a cave temple on Elephanta Island in India and the Angkor Wat temple in Cambodia. The bathing area includes a 27-metre-high (89 ft) water slide tower with four slides, a children's play area and a crazy golf course.

In 2008, a campsite was added close to the Tropical Islands hall.

== Attendance ==
At first, visitor numbers remained below original estimates. For a cost-effective operation, 1.25 million visitors per year are required. In 2005, the resort lost between 10 and 20 million euros. By October 2006 there were about 600,000 visitors. The initial lack of visitors has been attributed to a variety of reasons, including the relatively remote location of Tropical Islands. In addition, in Berlin, South Brandenburg, the resort's immediate surrounding area, the average disposable income is below the national average. The target demographic of the resort was extended to attract visitors from further away, including Poland.

By altering ticket prices and adding new overnight accommodations, visitor attendance subsequently improved. According to then-managing director Ole Bested Hensing, 2008 was the first time Tropical Islands Resort made a profit, when it recorded 300,000 overnight stays.

Early on in the resort's operations, there were issues with growing plants inside the dome, as it let in insufficient light for the plants to carry out photosynthesis effectively. In October 2005, the southern aspect of the dome along the "South Sea" bathing area had a special UV-transparent film made of ETFE installed. This 20,000-square-metre (220,000 ft^{2}) "window" allows unobstructed natural daylight to enter the dome. The palms, trees and bushes have grown well since.

== See also ==
- Hangar One
