= Brand-Briesen Airfield =

Former airfield in Brandenburg, Germany

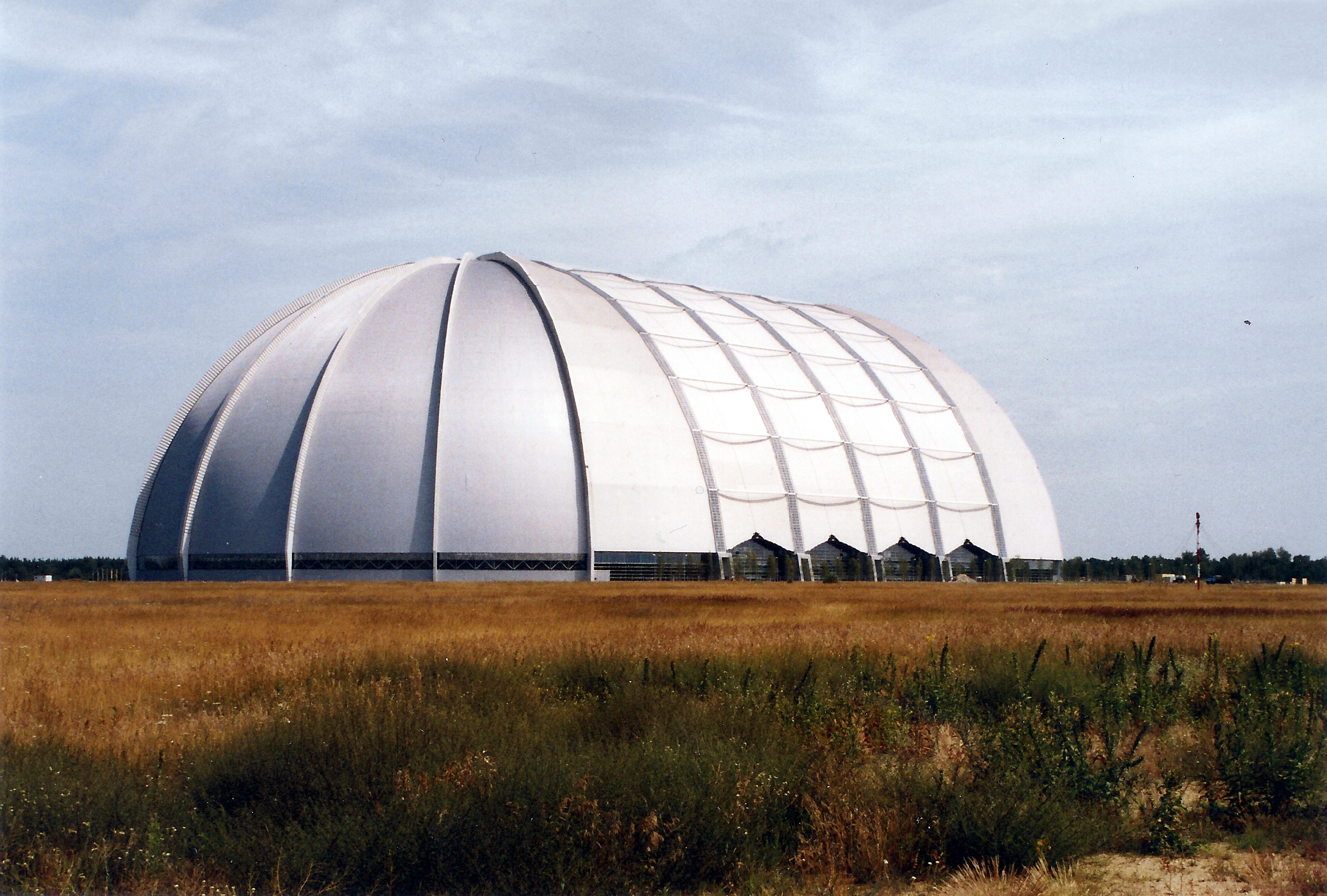
- The Cargolifter airship hangar at Brand-Briesen
- IATA: none; ICAO: EDUC

Summary
- Location: Brand, Germany
- Opened: 1939
- Built: 1938–1939
- In use: 1939–1994
- Occupants: Luftwaffe, Soviet Air Force
- Coordinates: 52°2′8.56″N 13°44′46.6″E

Map
- Location of airport in Brandenburg Brand-Briesen Airfield (Germany)

Runways
Direction	Length		Surface
Direction	ft	m	Surface
		2,500	concrete

Brand-Briesen Airfield is a redeveloped military air base located at Briesen/Brand, part of Halbe in Dahme-Spreewald, Brandenburg, Germany, about 60 km (37 mi) south-southeast of Berlin. Since 2004, the former CargoLifter airship hangar has been converted by a Malaysian company Tanjong into a leisure resort called Tropical Islands Resort.

== History ==
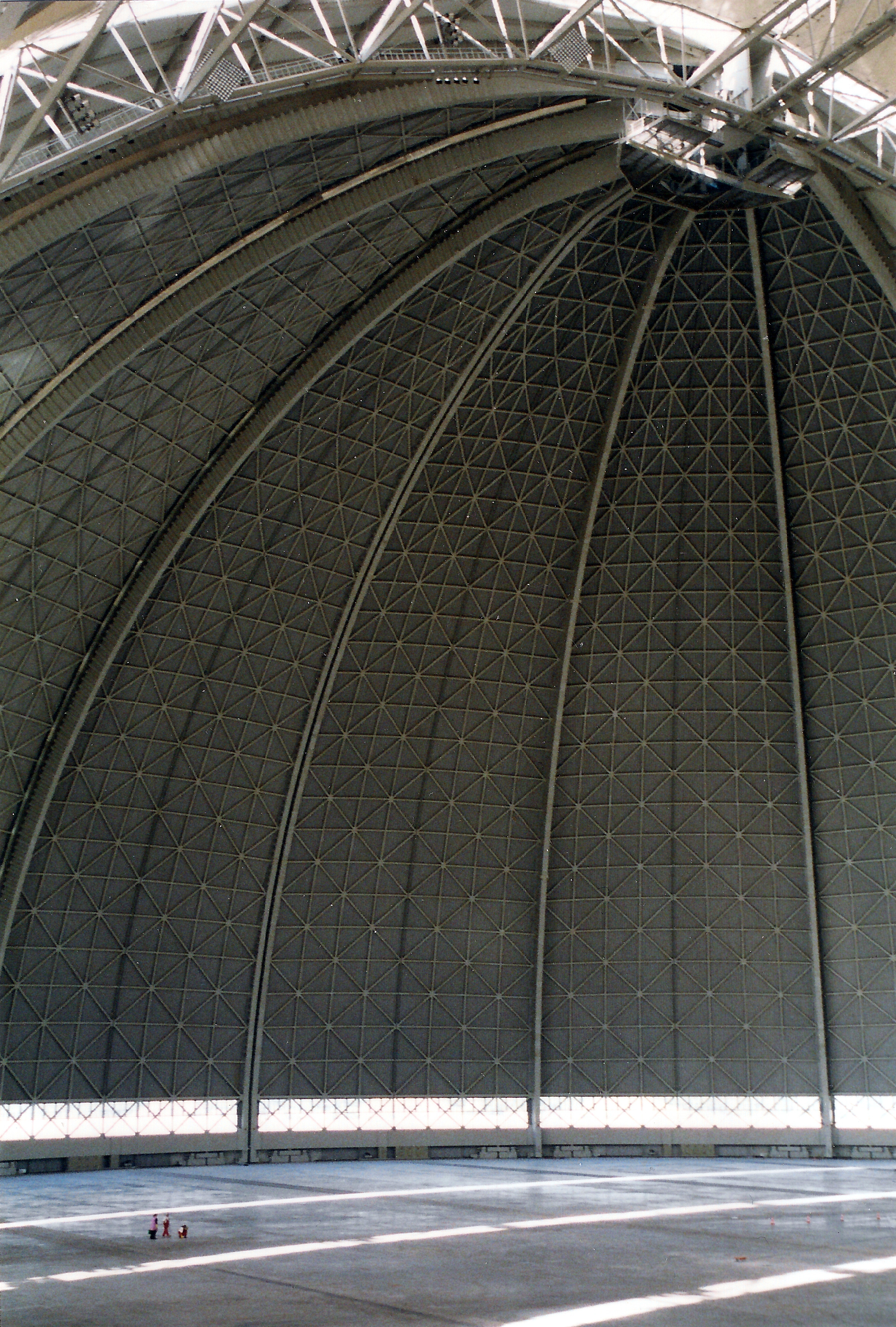
Interior of the CargoLifter hangar. Note the three people at the lower left for scale.

The airfield was built by the Luftwaffe during the expansion of the military by Nazi Germany, between 1938 and 1939. When opened it had a single 1,000 metres (3,300 ft) runway.

The airfield was occupied by the Red Army in May 1945. From this point forward, several units of the Soviet Air Force were stationed here. After extending the runway to 2,500 metres (8,200 ft) in the early 1950s, a 2,000 metres (6,600 ft) emergency runway and dispersal area were also added.

This allowed the base to house a fighter regiment, which was equipped with air superiority fighter aircraft, requiring the construction, in 1970, of 10 Hardened aircraft shelters (HAS), and in 1972 a second parallel 2,500 metres (8,200 ft) main runway. In the late 1970s additional HAS's were added bringing their numbers to 24, with a nuclear alert bunker built in the early 1980s.

With the reunification of Germany from 1989/1990, the Soviet Army agreed to return all military bases by the end of 1994. With the assistance of an airlift undertaken by Antonov An-22 aircraft, the airfield was handed back to the Federal Government of Germany in 1992.

== CargoLifter ==
In 1996, the CargoLifter company was founded in Wiesbaden, who intended to build airships. While the former north main runway was being demolished, CargoLifter began building the then-largest freebearing hall in the world in the centre of the site, where they intended to set up production of airships. The hall (360 m long, 220 m wide and 106 m high), was a freestanding steel-dome "barrel-bowl" construction, large enough to fit the Eiffel Tower on its side. The hangar was also equipped with a 180 m cutting table to manufacture the airship's envelope. Construction of the hall was complete in November 2000, at a cost of €78M.

== Tropical Islands Resort ==
CargoLifter managed to construct operational prototypes, but went bankrupt in mid-2002.

In June 2003, receivers sold the hall and 500 hectares of grounds to Malaysian company Tanjong, who converted the hall into a leisure park called Tropical Islands Resort.
