= CargoLifter =

German defunct heavy lift airship company

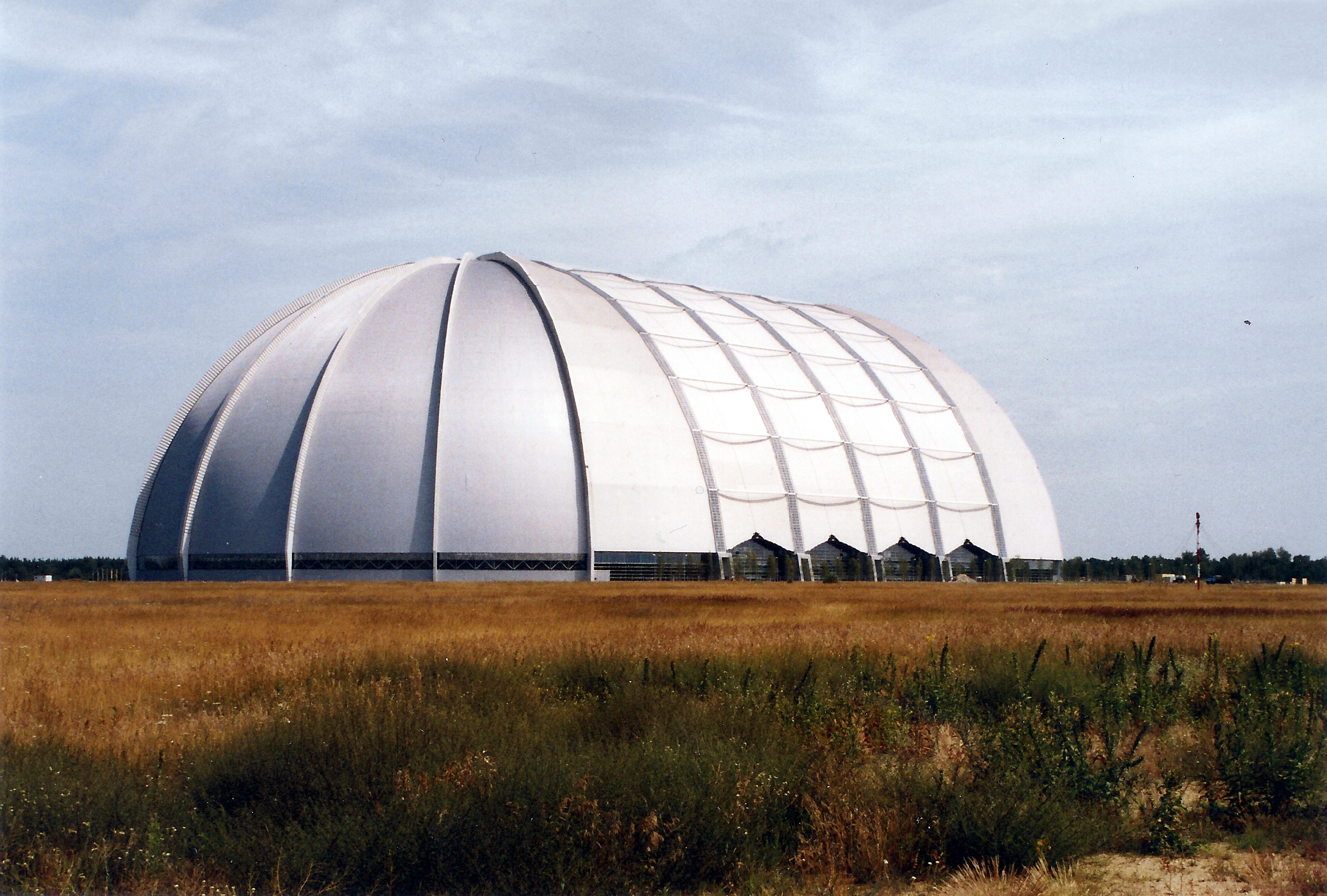
Exterior view of hangar at the former Brand-Briesen Airfield, built for Cargolifter

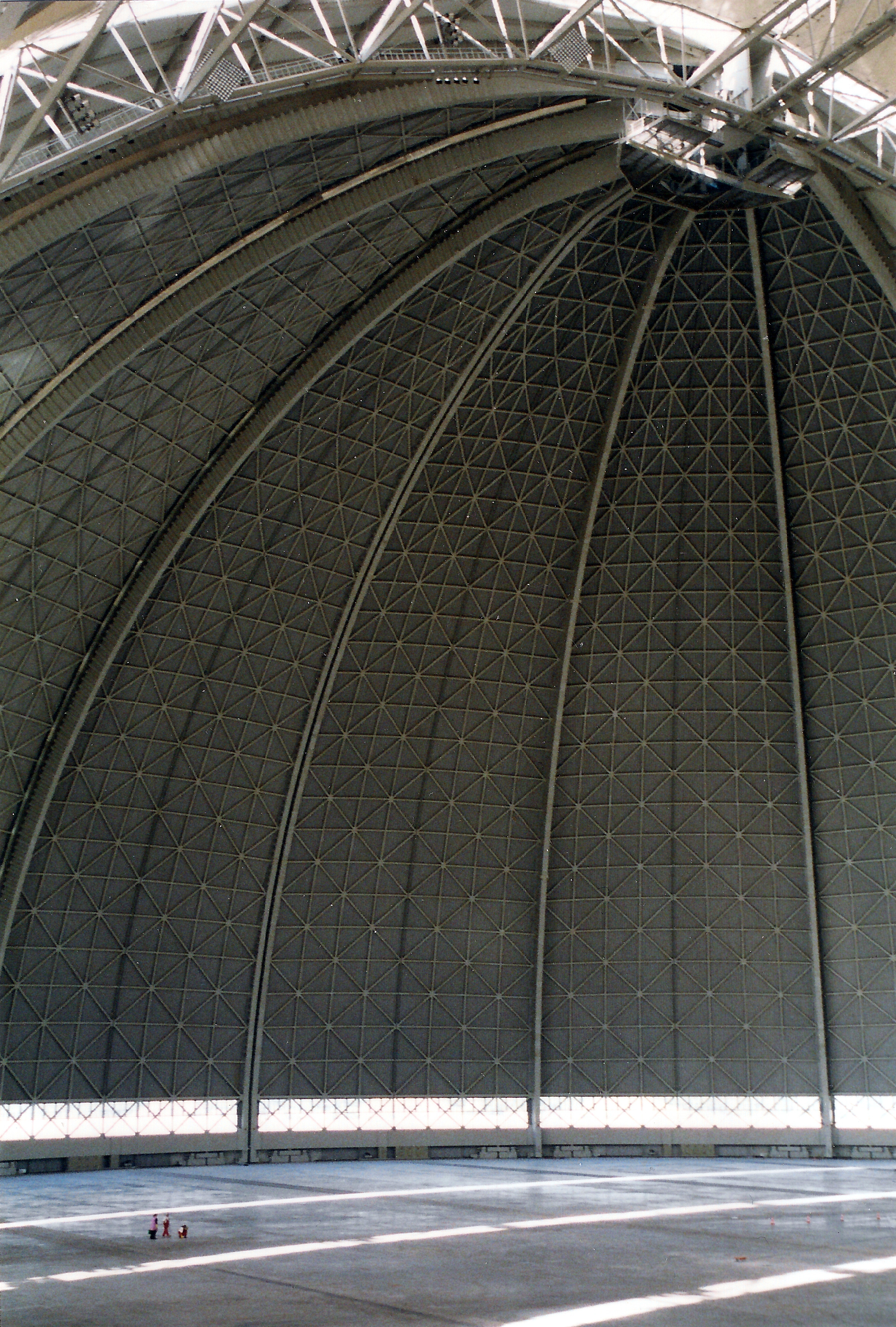
Interior. Note the three people at the lower left for scale.

Cargolifter AG was a German company founded in 1996 to offer logistical services through point-to point transport of heavy and outsized loads. This service was based on the development of a heavy lift airship, the CL160, a 550,000 m^{3} (19,000,000 cu ft) vessel designed to carry a 160 t (160,000 kg; 350,000 lb) payload. The airship was never built and the company went bankrupt in July 2002. Today, shareholder-founded CL CargoLifter GmbH & Co. KG company seeks to continue selling the lighter-than-air technology. CargoLifter and Russia’s Aerosmena are among those developing huge airships that can lift up to 600 tons (609 tonnes) of freight while hovering above the ground or sea.

Cargolifter AG was founded by a group of influential engineers and scientists in 1996, and its main goal was to promote airships and develop technologies for their use as a lifting mechanism for transporting heavy and bulky goods to hard-to-reach places. As one cubic meter of helium has a buoyancy of roughly one kilogram, the size of a craft required to lift heavy loads is considerable.

== History ==
=== Company ===
Cargolifter AG was created on 1 September 1996 in Wiesbaden, Germany. A public stock offering took place in May 2000, and the resulting shareholder structure was characterized by a high proportion of small investors, attracted by substantial press coverage of the new breakthrough technologies being promised.

=== Hangar ===
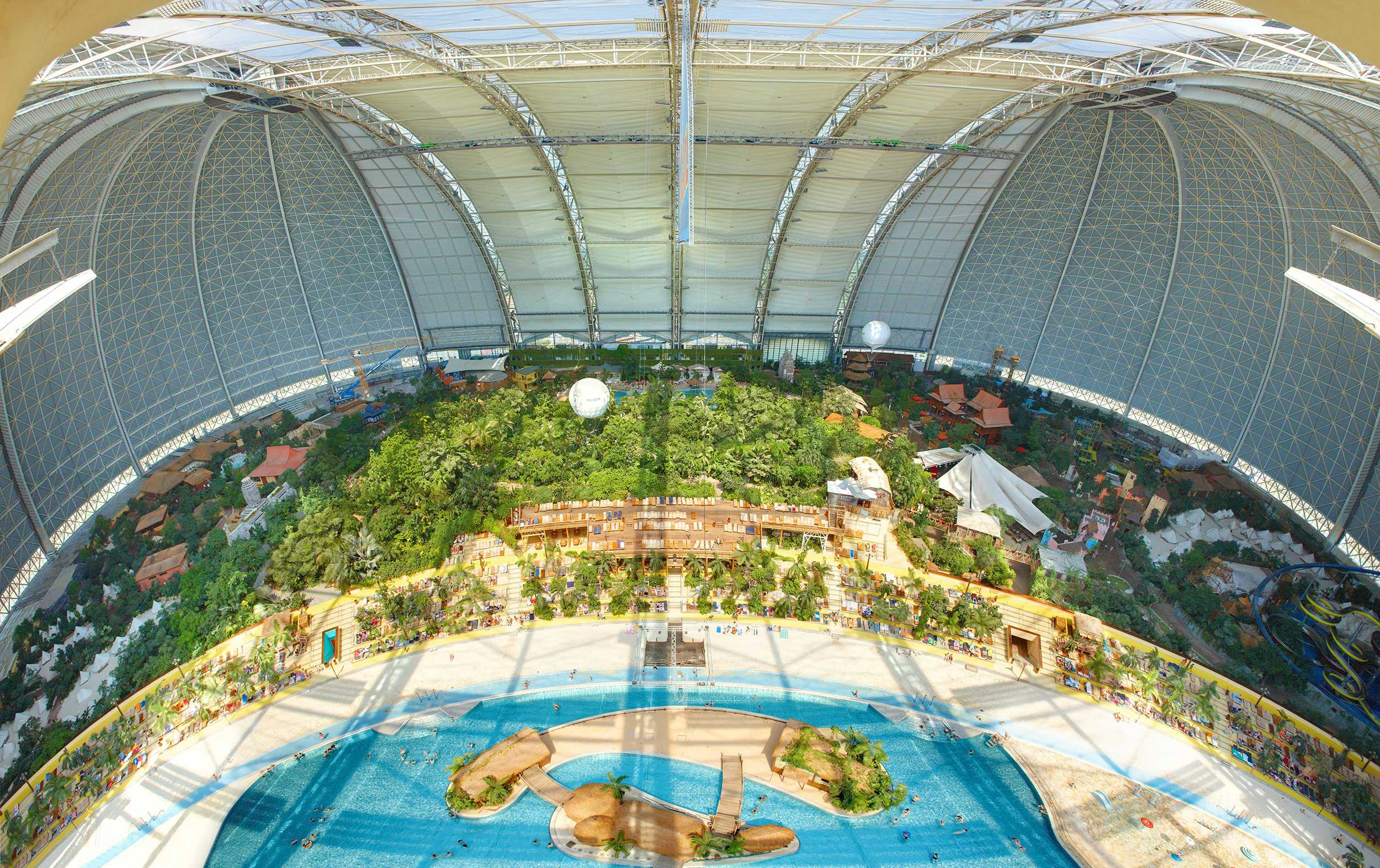
Hangar as Tropical Islands Resort

The hangar for production and operation of the CL160 and engineering team facilities were built on the former Soviet Air Force base at Brand-Briesen Airfield, Brandenburg, acquired to enable development and operations. The hangar (360 m (1,180 ft) long, 220 m (720 ft) wide and 106 m (348 ft) high) is a freestanding steel-dome "barrel-bowl" construction. The hangar was also equipped with a 180 m (590 ft) cutting table to manufacture the airship's envelope.

After the company went bankrupt in 2002, the Tropical Islands Resort water park was opened there in 2004.

=== Airship ===
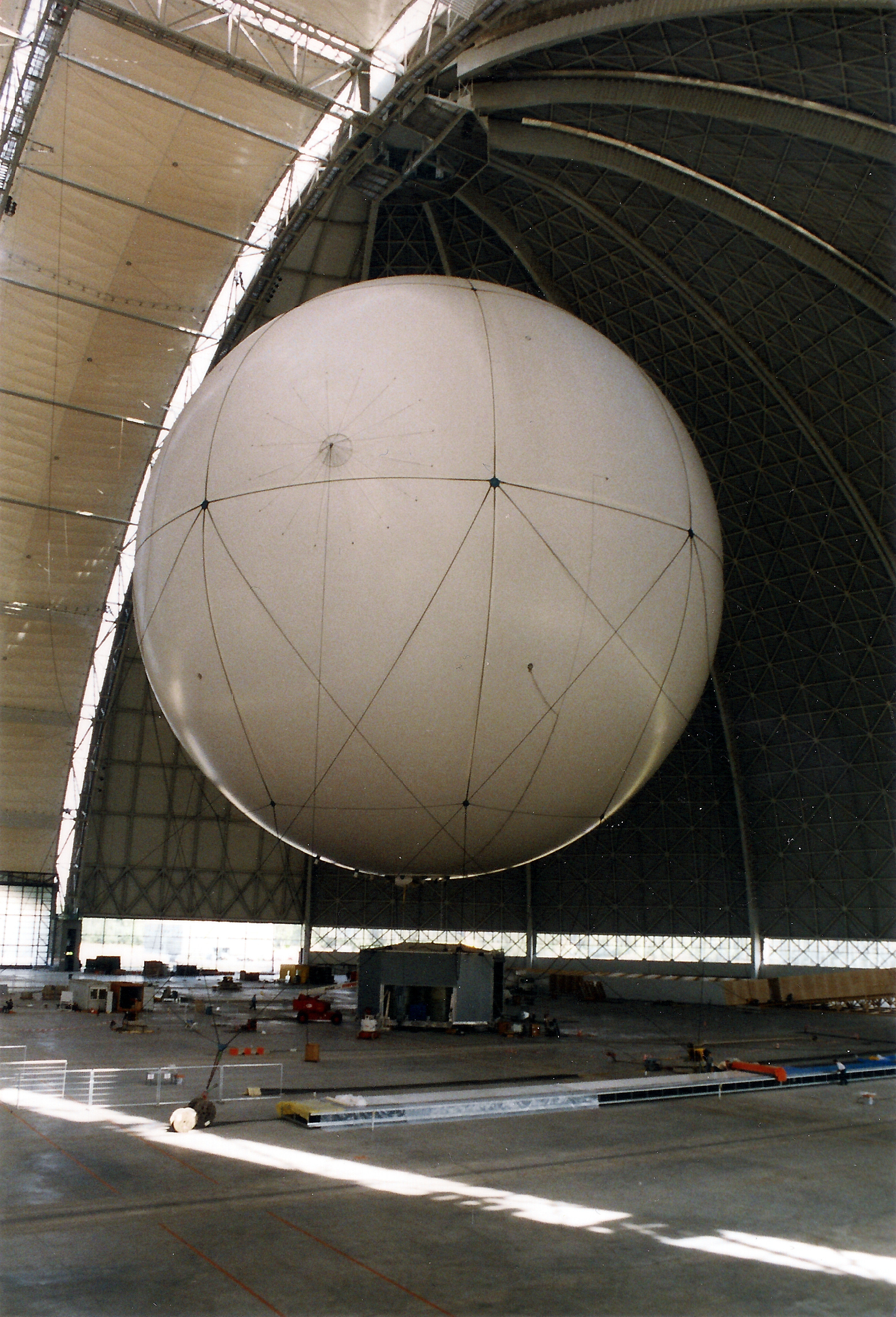
The CargoLifter CL75 AirCrane, a cargo-lift mechanism using a balloon filled with helium, inside the CargoLifter hangar

The first CL 160 airship was never built, though a considerable amount of design and development work was undertaken. The technical complexity along with limited funding, and short development timeline meant that program challenges were underestimated, making the project relatively risky.

A small crewed prototype named 'Joey' was built to test project concepts on a reduced scale. Another aircraft, the CL 75 AirCrane transportation balloon prototype, of similar size (61 metres (200 ft) in diameter) and height 87 metres (285 ft) to the CL 160, was built but destroyed in a storm in July 2002. Despite the setback, an agreement was reached with Boeing in 2002 for the joint study of a lighter-than-air stratospheric platform.

The Cargolifter CL75 AirCrane prototype, filled with 110,000 m^{3} of helium, was taken out of the hangar for the first time in October 2001. It represented a new stage in full-scale experimental purposes. The load frame of this unit was engineered by American company AdvanTek International LLC. The sale of one CL 75 Aircrane along with 25 options (at a unit price of US$10 million), was later planned to the Canadian company Heavy Elevator Canada Inc., a deal with which CargoLifter AG was at least 20% involved. The contract never became effective.

== Insolvency ==
On 7 June 2002 the company announced insolvency, and liquidation proceedings began the following month. The fate of parts of the 300 million euros in shareholder funds from over 70,000 investors is still unclear.

In June 2003, the company's facilities were sold off for less than 20% of the construction costs. The airship hangar was converted to a 'tropical paradise'-themed indoor holiday resort called Tropical Islands, which opened in 2004.

The Skyship airship, which had been purchased by Cargolifter for training and research purposes, was sold to Swiss Skycruise and used in Athens for flights connected with the Olympic games held there.

== Continuation ==
The CL CargoLifter GmbH & Co. KG company, founded by former Cargolifter AG shareholders, seeks to sell the lighter-than-air technology and is exploring the construction of smaller airships.

== See also ==
- Aeroscraft, a hybrid airship with the same aim as CargoLifter
- Walrus HULA
- Airlander
