= Marine Corps Air Station Tustin =

Former US Marine Corps Air base

- Tustin, California
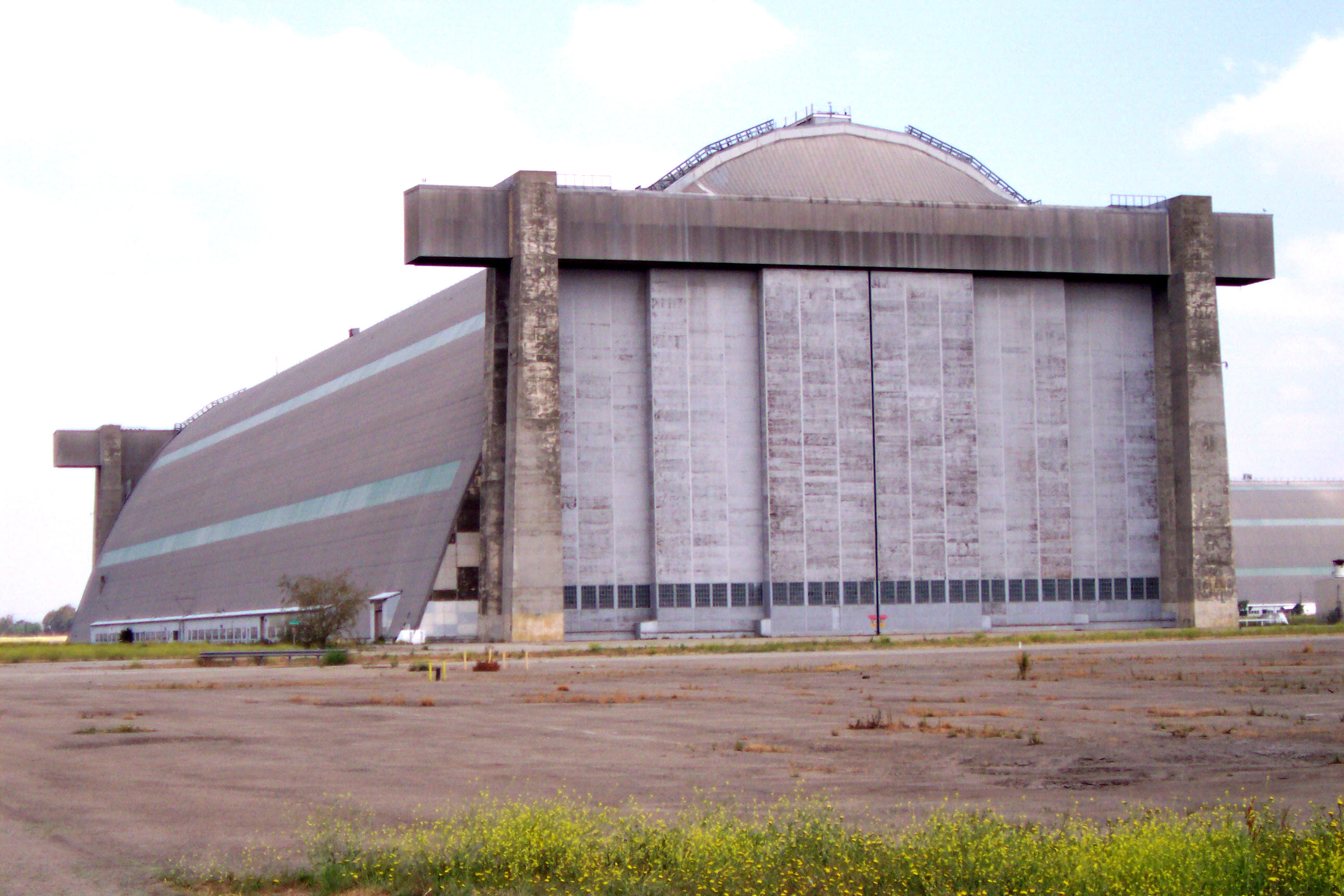
- Hangar No. 2 (South Hangar) at the former Marine Corps Air Station in Tustin, California measures 1,072 feet (327 m) long by 292 feet (89 m) wide by 192 feet (59 m) tall. It and its sister structure (partially visible to the right) are listed on the National Register of Historic Places and designated a National Historic Civil Engineering Landmark. The two hangars, built in 1942 of Oregon Douglas fir, are among the largest free-standing wooden structures in the world. Hangar No. 1 (North Hangar) was destroyed by fire in November, 2023.

Site information
- Type: Military base
- Controlled by: United States Marine Corps

Location
- Location in the United States Location in California
- Coordinates: 33.707°N 117.825°W

Site history
- Built: commencing 1 April 1942
- In use: 7 October 1942 – 2 July 1999

Marine Corps Air Station Tustin (IATA: NTK, ICAO: KNTK, FAA LID: NTK) is a former United States Navy and United States Marine Corps air station, located in Tustin, California.

== History ==
The Air Station was established in 1942 by the United States Navy as a lighter-than-air base, officially known as Naval Air Station Santa Ana. The base was designed for blimp operations in support of the Navy's coastal patrol efforts during World War II. It was commissioned on 1 October 1942 by its commandant, Capt. Howard N. Coulter. As of July 1947, the facility, under command of Capt. Benjamin May, had personnel consisting of 100 officers, 500 enlisted men and 180 civilian employees. NAS Santa Ana was decommissioned in 1949. In 1951, the facility was reactivated as Marine Corps Air Facility Santa Ana to support the Korean War. It was the country's first air facility developed solely for helicopter operations. It was named "Marine Corps Air Station, Santa Ana" in 1966 and renamed Marine Corps Air Station Tustin in 1979.

During the Vietnam War, the base was a center for on-going testing of radar installations (including the Sperry TPS-34) which were erected, tested, disassembled and shipped to South Vietnam. It also was a training facility for helicopter pilots.

By the early 1990s, MCAS Tustin was a major center for Marine Corps helicopter aviation and radar on the Pacific Coast. Its primary purpose was to provide support services and material for the 3rd Marine Aircraft Wing and for other units utilizing the base. About 4,500 residents once lived on the base, and the base employed nearly 5,000 military personnel and civilians. In addition to providing military support, MCAS Tustin leased 530 acres (2.1 km^{2}) to farmers for commercial crop development. For many years, agricultural lands surrounded the facility. However beginning in the 1980s residential and light industrial/manufacturing areas developed adjacent to the station.

In 1991 and again in 1993, under the authority of the Base Realignment and Closure Act of 1990, it was announced that MCAS Tustin would be closed. Operational closure of the base occurred in July 1999. Of the approximately 1,600 acres (650 ha), some 1,294 acres (524 ha) (now known collectively as "Tustin Legacy") have been conveyed to the City of Tustin, private developers and public institutions for a combination of residential, commercial, educational, and public recreational and open-space uses. The remaining 300-plus acres (120 ha) will be conveyed to other federal agencies, the City of Tustin, and public institutions for the same uses once environmental clean-up operations have been concluded. The site of the base is now the home of the academy of the Orange County Sheriff's Department. Much of the former base has become residential housing.

The base was featured in Visiting... with Huell Howser Episode 1509.

== Blimp hangars ==
In 1993, the blimp hangars were designated a National Civil Engineering Landmark by the American Society of Civil Engineers (ASCE). Worldwide Aeros Corp utilized the north hangar to build a prototype cargo airship under contract from the Pentagon and NASA. In October, 2013, part of the roof collapsed, damaging the airship prototype. There was interest in making one of the hangars a military museum.

The Tustin hangars appeared in many movies, television shows, and TV commercials. They include The Hindenburg, JAG, The X-files, From the Earth to the Moon, Austin Powers: The Spy Who Shagged Me, Pearl Harbor, and Star Trek.

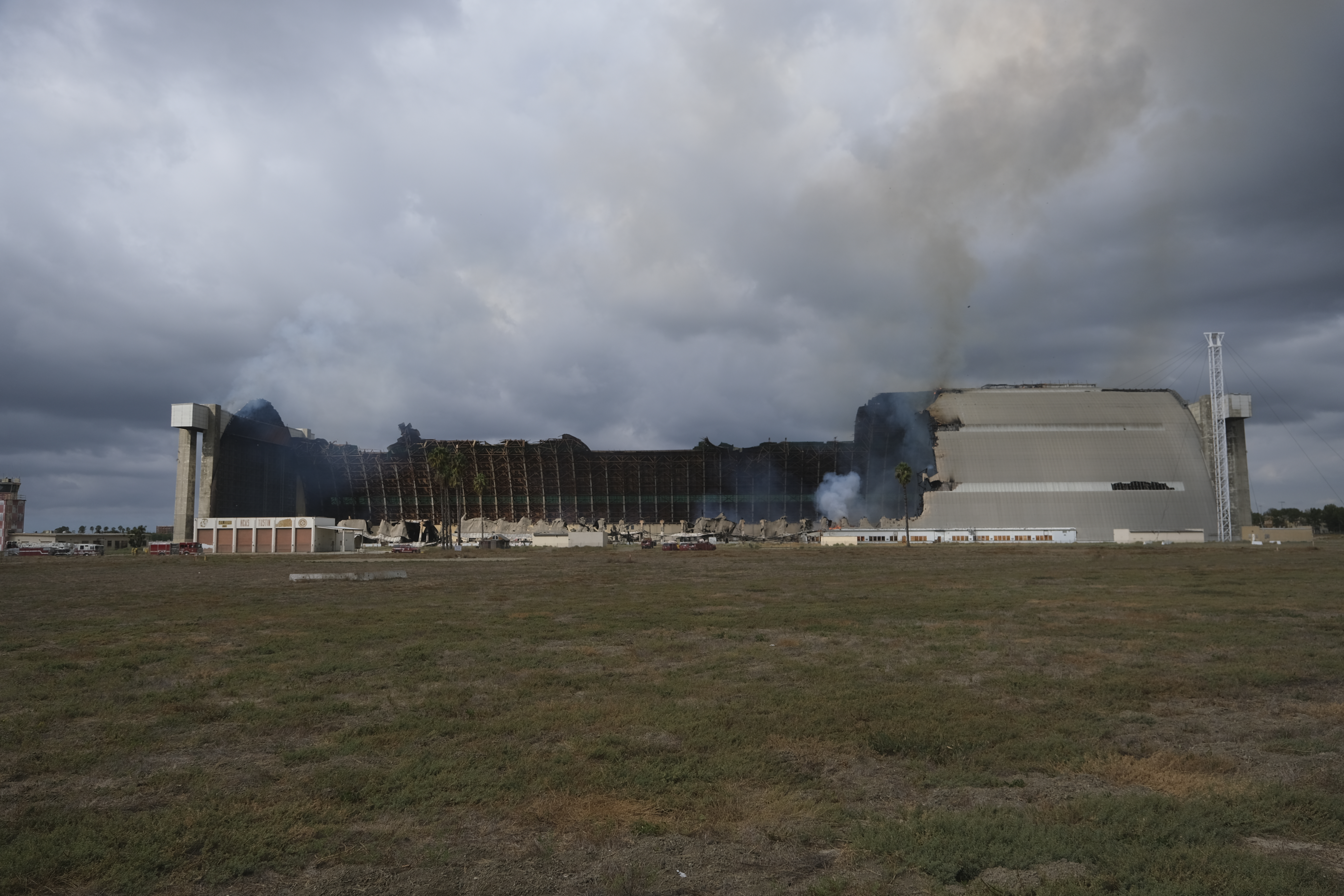
Tustin Hangar No. 1 fire, 11:48 am 7 November 2023

On 7 November 2023 at approximately 12:53am, a three-alarm fire broke out on the roof of the North Hangar. Orange County Fire Authority units responded, adapting a defensive strategy and letting it burn due to the risk of roof collapse. An investigation has been opened into the cause of the fire. Several schools in Tustin Unified School District were temporarily closed when asbestos was detected near the fire on 9 November. Tustin authorities planned to demolish the remainder of the hangar, and demolition commenced in December. The hangar site is to be completely remediated by the U.S. Navy.

== Proposals ==
Plans are in the works to convert 84.5 acres (34.2 ha) of the former base into a regional park, originally scheduled to be opened in 2016. In the summer of 2013, OC Parks was in the process of gathering input from the community in order to determine the features and layout of the forthcoming facilities.

Although the preservation of the hangars is one of the greatest concerns raised in surveys taken by OC Parks, the fate of the south hangar is uncertain.

The City of Tustin has met with officials from the Los Angeles Angels of Anaheim, proposing the former air base as a potential site for a new stadium for the team, whose lease with the City of Anaheim's Angel Stadium allowed the team to opt out between 2016 and 2019.

In 2016, Orange County and the South Orange County Community College District arranged for a land swap of ten acres to be used to replace the aging Orange County Animal Shelter in nearby Orange. In July 2016, a ground-breaking ceremony was held.

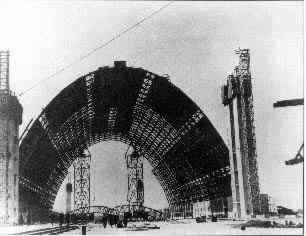
Hangar No. 1 at MCAS Tustin under construction, 1942.

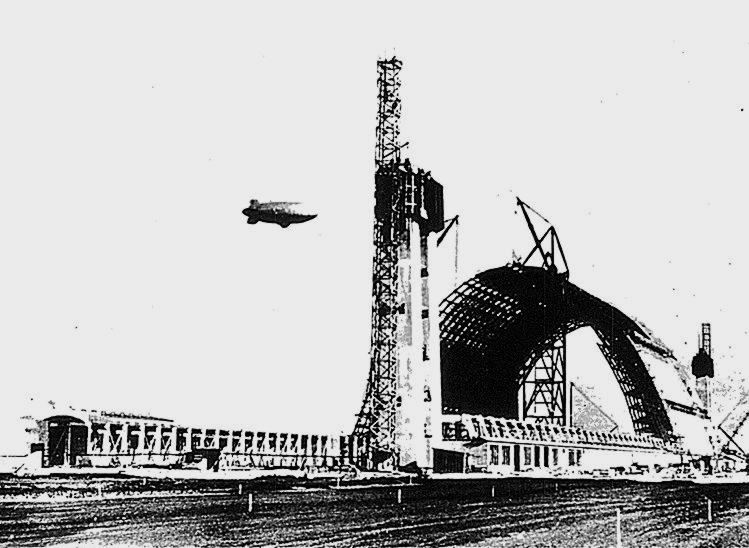
A different view of Hangar No. 1 under construction.

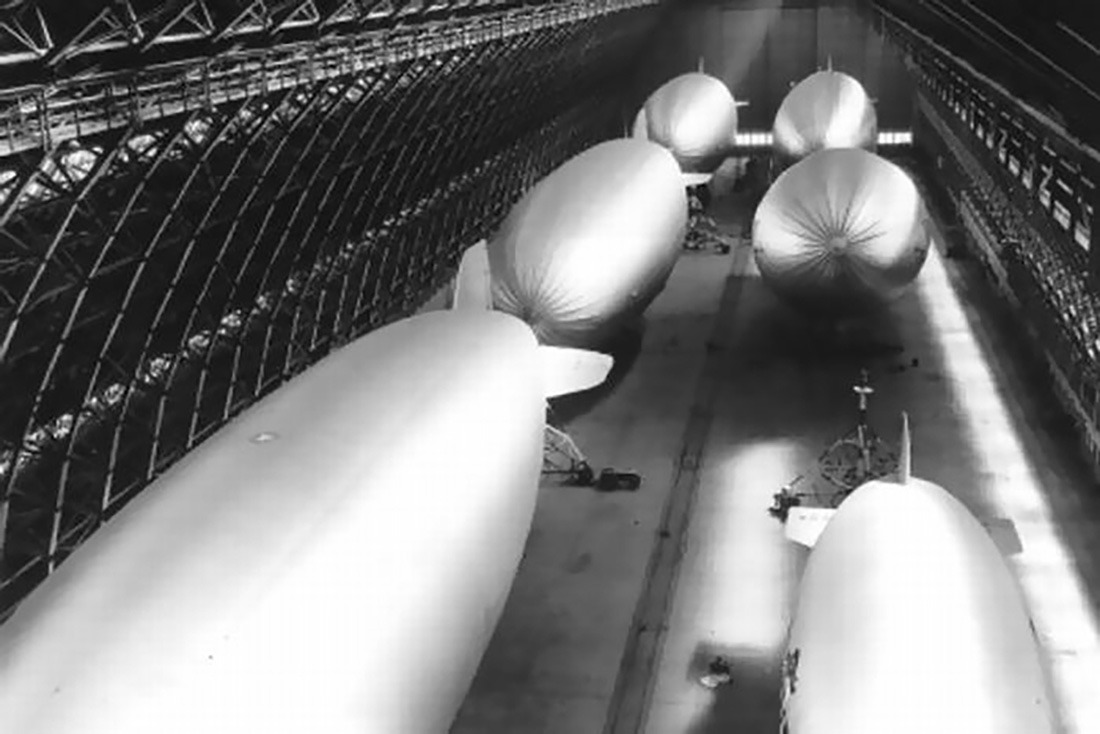
Six US Navy blimps in one of the two hangars at MCAS Tustin, date unknown.

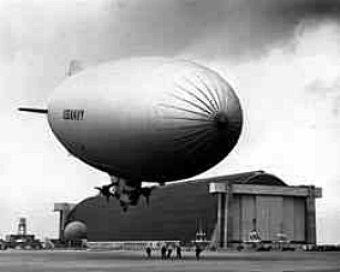
A 1943 photo of a Navy 'K' type blimp in front of one of MCAS Tustin's massive blimp hangars.

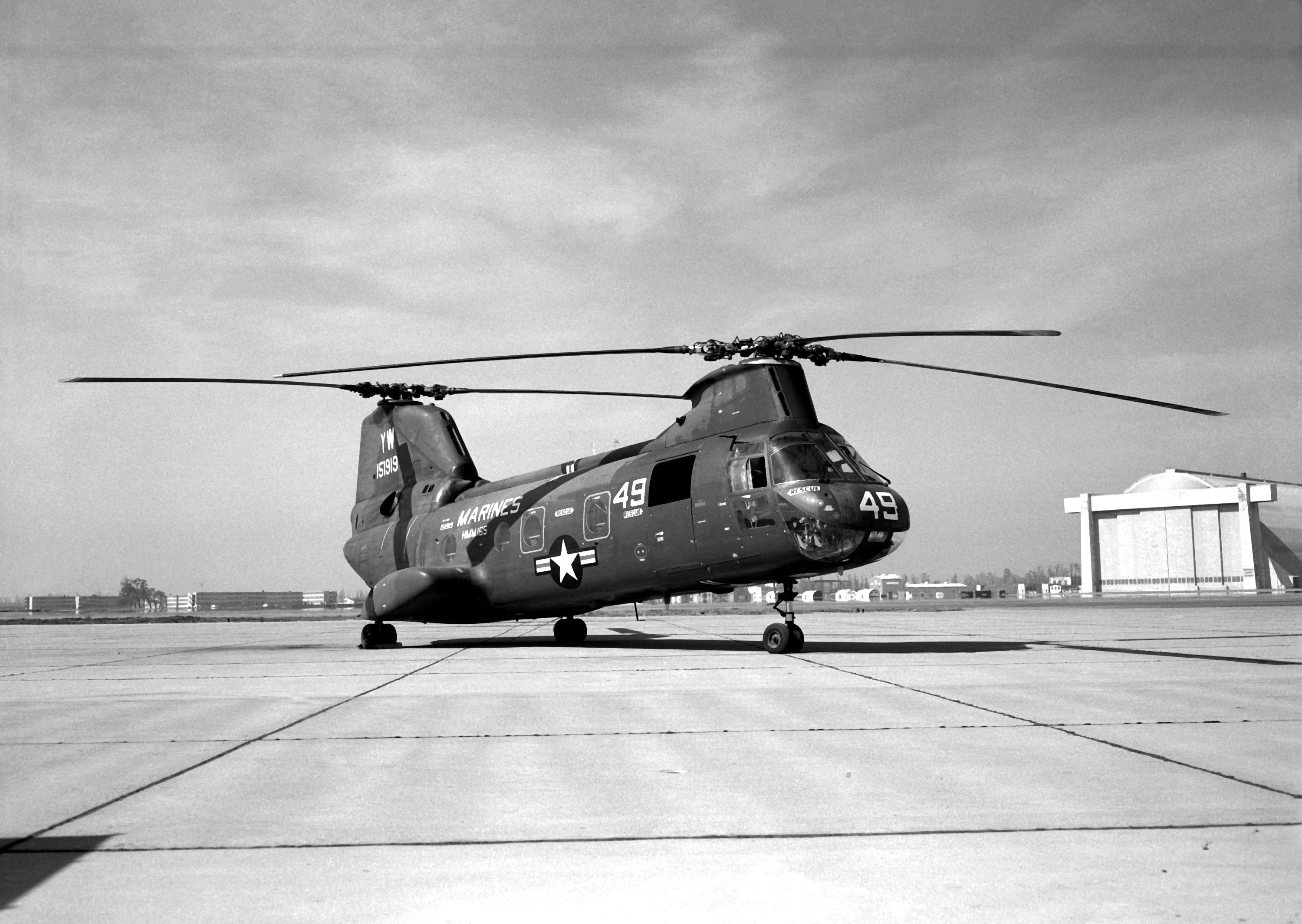
A March, 1966 photo of a CH-46A "Sea Knight" helicopter from HMM-165, with one of Tustin's massive blimp hangars in the background.

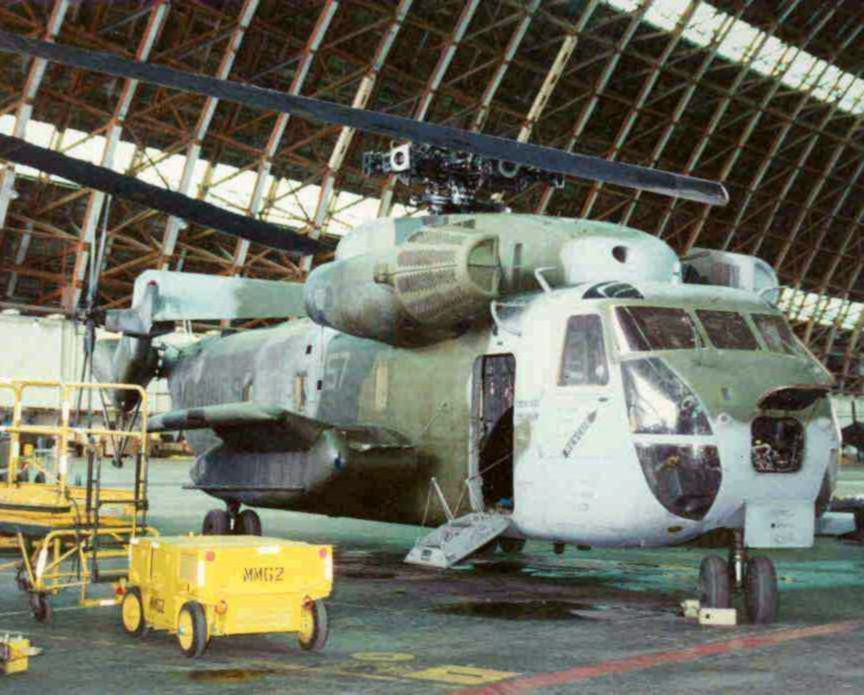
A USMC CH-53D "Sea Stallion" helicopter undergoes maintenance inside one of MCAS Tustin's giant blimp hangars, date unknown.

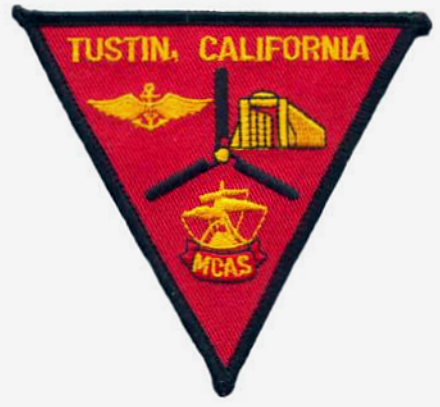
MCAS Tustin insignia.

== See also ==
- List of United States Marine Corps installations
- Hangar One (Mountain View, California)
- Tillamook Air Museum
- Navy Air Stations Blimps bases
