= ESTOLAS =

Hybrid aircraft

ESTOLAS (Extremely Short Take Off and Landing on Any Surface) was a proposal for a hybrid type of aircraft that was developed from 2012 to 2014 in a project funded by the European Commission.

Instead of an airplane's usual long, relatively narrow fuselage, it was proposed to have a bloated central void filled with helium gas to make the aircraft lighter. In addition, vertical lift was to be provided by a centrally located horizontal propeller, which, together with a skirt, gives properties of a hovercraft and capability to land and take off from water, snow, and other surfaces.

The 24-month project had a budget of €708,426.
