= Walrus HULA =

Experimental airship project

The Walrus HULA (Hybrid Ultra Large Aircraft) project was a DARPA-funded experiment to create an airship capable of traveling up to 12,000 nautical miles (about 22,000 km) in range, while carrying 500–1000 tons of air cargo[Source needed]. In distinct contrast to earlier generation airships, the Walrus HULA would be a heavier-than-air vehicle and would generate lift through a combination of aerodynamics, thrust vectoring, and gas buoyancy generation and management. [Source needed]

DARPA said advances in envelope and hull materials, buoyancy and lift control, drag reduction and propulsion combined to make this concept feasible. [Source needed] Technologies to be investigated in the initial study phase included vacuum/air buoyancy compensator tanks, which provide buoyancy control without ballast, and electrostatic atmospheric ion propulsion. [Source needed]

The WALRUS could potentially expand and speed the strategic airlift capability of the United States substantially while simultaneously reducing costs. [Source needed] A smaller scale demonstration was scheduled for 2008, when a small scale version of the WALRUS designed to carry only the capacity of a C-130 Hercules (i.e., 18,000 kg or about 40,000 lbs) was expected to fly. [Source needed]

The project was cancelled in 2010. [Source needed]

== See also ==
- P-791
- Aeroscraft
- CargoLifter
- Hybrid airship

== Sources ==
- Defense Industry Daily (Oct 21/05) - US Congressional Budget Office Gives OK to HULA Airships for Airlift
- "Strange shapes: The US Defense Advanced Research Projects Agency is continuing its tradition of looking into some weird and wonderful designs with three 'new' concepts". Flight International. September 13, 2005.
- Defense Industry Daily (July 6/05) - USAF Looking at Near-Space Blimps
- "USA seeks heavylift cargo carrier". Flight International. February 10, 2004.
