= Soviet Air Forces order of battle 1 May 1945 =

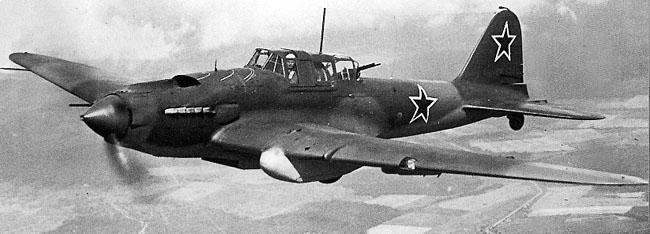
A Soviet Air Forces Ilyushin Il-2 ground attack aircraft

Following is the organization of the Soviet Air Forces (Voenno-Vozdushnye Sily) on May 1, 1945. The primary source for this list is the Boevoi sostav Sovetskoi armii (Combat Composition of the Soviet Army) list for 1 May 1945.

== Leningrad Front ==
=== 15th Air Army ===
- 5th Bomber Corps (4th, 5th Guards Bomber Aviation Divisions)

==== 14th Fighter Corps ====
- 185th, 315th Fighter Aviation Divisions

==== Other units ====
- 284th, 313th Night Bomber Aviation Divisions
- 214th, 225th, 305th Assault Aviation Divisions
- 99th Guards Reconnaissance Aviation Regiment
- 187th Fire Correction Aviation Regiment
- 699th Transport Aviation Regiment
- 97th Aviation Regiment of the Civil Air Fleet
- 87th Night Bomber Aviation Squadron
- 336th Fighter Aviation Division
- 1639th, 1683rd, 1685th Anti-Aircraft Artillery Regiment
- 1003rd Separate Medical Evacuation Aviation Regiment

=== 13th Air Army ===
- 281st Assault Aviation Division
- 275th Fighter Aviation Division
- 13th Reconnaissance Aviation Regiment
- 199th Communications Aviation Regiment
- 1583rd, 1674th Anti-Aircraft Artillery Regiments

== 3rd Belorussian Front ==
=== 1st Air Army ===
- 6th Guards, 276th Bomber Aviation Divisions
- 1st Guards, 182nd, 277th, 311th Assault Aviation Divisions
- 129th, 130th, 303rd, 330th Fighter Aviation Divisions
- 213th Night Bomber Aviation Division
- 406th Night Bomber Aviation Regiment
- 10th, 90th Reconnaissance Aviation Regiments
- 117th, 151st Fire Correction Aviation Regiments
- 142nd Transport Aviation Regiment
- 1st Separate Evacuation Aviation Regiment
- 354th Communications Aviation Regiment
- 1st French Air Regiment
- 1551st, 1552nd, 1553rd, 1665th, 1602nd, 1608th Anti-Aircraft Artillery Regiments

=== 3rd Air Army ===
==== 11th Fighter Aviation Corps ====
- 5th Guards, 190th Fighter Aviation Divisions

==== Other units ====
- 3rd Guards Bomber Aviation Division
- 314th Nighter Bomber Divisions
- 211th, 335th Assault Aviation Divisions
- 259th Fighter Aviation Division
- 6th Guards Assault Aviation Regiment
- 11th Reconnaissance Aviation Regiment
- 206th Fire Correction Aviation Regiment
- 763rd Transport Aviation Regiment
- 87th Separate Evacuation Aviation Regiment
- 399th Communications Aviation Regiment
- 1556th, 1557th, 1558th, 1604th Anti-Aircraft Artillery Regiments

== 2nd Belorussian Front ==
- 994th Communications Aviation Regiment operating in conjunction with the 5th Guards Tank Army

=== 4th Air Army ===
==== 5th Bomber Corps ====
- 132nd, 327th Bomber Aviation Divisions

==== 4th Ground Attack Corps ====
- 196th, 199th Bomber Aviation Divisions

==== 8th Fighter Corps ====
- 215th, 323rd Fighter Aviation Divisions

==== Other units ====
- 230th, 233rd, 260th, 332nd Assault Aviation Divisions
- 229th, 269th, 309th, 329th Fighter Aviation Divisions
- 325th Night Bomber Aviation Division
- 47th, 164th Guards Reconnaissance Aviation Regiments
- 204th, 209th Fire Correction Aviation Regiments
- 213th Separate Evacuation Aviation Regiment
- 184th Communications Aviation Regiment
- 844th Transport Aviation Regiment
- 69th Civil Air Fleet Regiment
- 1550th, 1559th, 1584th, 1601st, 1606th, 1607th, 1655th Anti-Aircraft Artillery Regiments

== 1st Belorussian Front ==
- 191st Guards Communications Aviation Regiment operating in conjunction with the 1st Guards Tank Army;

=== 16th Air Army ===
==== 3rd Bomber Corps ====
- 183rd, 241st, 301st Bomber Aviation Divisions

==== 6th Bomber Corps ====
- 113th, 326th, 334th Bomber Aviation Divisions

==== 6th Assault Aviation Corps ====
- 197th, 198th Assault Aviation Divisions

==== 9th Assault Aviation Corps ====
- 3rd Guards, 300th Assault Aviation Divisions

==== 1st Guards Fighter Aviation Corps ====
- 3rd and 4th Guards Fighter Aviation Divisions

==== 3rd Fighter Aviation Corps ====
- 265th, 278th Fighter Aviation Divisions

==== 6th Fighter Aviation Corps ====
- 234th, 273rd Fighter Aviation Divisions

==== 13th Fighter Aviation Corps ====
- 193rd, 283rd Fighter Aviation Divisions

==== Other units ====
- 188th, 221st Bomber Aviation Divisions
- 2nd, 11th Guards Assault Aviation Divisions
- 1st Guards Fighter Aviation Division
- 240th Fighter Aviation Division
- 282nd Fighter Aviation Division
- 286th Fighter Aviation Division
- 9th Guards, 242nd Night Bomber Aviation Divisions
- 176th Guards Fighter Aviation Regiment
- 16th, 72nd Reconnaissance Aviation Regiments
- 93rd, 98th Fire Correction Aviation Regiments
- 226th Transport Aviation Regiment
- 62nd Guards Civil Air Fleet Regiment
- 325th, 1560th, 1581st, 1597th, 1609th, 1610th, 1611th, 1612th, 1974th Anti-Aircraft Artillery Regiments

==== Subordinated units and groups ====
- 6th Separate Evacuation Aviation Regiment
- 919th Communications Aviation Regiment

== 1st Ukrainian Front ==
- 372nd Communications Aviation Regiment operating in conjunction with the 3rd Guards Tank Army;
- 1002nd Mixed Aviation Regiment (subordinate to front authority);

=== 2nd Air Army ===
==== 4th Bomber Corps ====
- 202nd, 219th Bomber Aviation Divisions

==== 6th Guards Bomber Corps ====
- 1st, 8th Guards Bomber Aviation Divisions

==== 1st Guards Assault Aviation Corps ====
- 8th, 9th Guards Assault Aviation Divisions

==== 2nd Guards Assault Aviation Corps ====
- 5th, 6th Guards Assault Aviation Divisions

==== 3rd Assault Aviation Corps ====
- 307th, 308th Assault Aviation Divisions, 181st Fighter Aviation Division

==== 2nd Fighter Aviation Corps ====
- 7th Guards, 322nd Fighter Aviation Divisions

==== 5th Fighter Aviation Corps ====
- 8th Guards, 256th Fighter Aviation Divisions

==== 6th Guards Fighter Aviation Corps ====
- 9th, 22nd, 23rd Guards Fighter Aviation Divisions
- 11th, 12th Guards Fighter Aviation Divisions

==== Other units ====
- 208th Night Bomber Aviation Division
- 98th Guards Separate Reconnaissance Aviation Regiment
- 193rd Guards Reconnaissance Aviation Regiment
- 118th, 203rd Fire Correction Aviation Regiments, 228th Transport Aviation Regiment
- 4th Separate Evacuation Aviation Regiment
- 23rd Regiment of the Civil Air Fleet
- 1554th, 1555th, 1561st, 1577th, 1582nd, 1605th, 1613th, 1680th Anti-Aircraft Artillery Regiment

== 4th Ukrainian Front ==
=== 8th Air Army ===
==== 8th Assault Aviation Corps ====
- 224th, 227th Assault Aviation Division

==== 10th Fighter Aviation Corps ====
- 10th, 15th Guards Fighter Aviation Division
- 321st Bomber Aviation Division
- 8th Reconnaissance Aviation Regiment
- 100th Fire Correction Reconnaissance Aviation Regiment
- 678th Transportation Aviation Regiment
- 212th Independent Evacuation Aviation Regiment
- 200th Aviation Signals Regiment
- 87th Guards Aviation Regiment of Civil Air Fleet
- 1578th, 1603th, 1682nd Air Defense Artillery Regiment

== 2nd Ukrainian Front ==
- 6th Guards Tank Army - 207th Guards Communications Aviation Regiment

=== 5th Air Army ===
- 3rd Guards Assault Aviation Corps
  - 7th and 12th Guards Assault Aviation Divisions
- 5th Assault Aviation Corps
  - 4th Guards and 264th Assault Aviation Divisions
- 3rd Guards Fighter Aviation Corps
  - 13th and 14th Guards Fighter Aviation Divisions
- 218th Bomber Aviation Division
- 312th Night Bomber Aviation Division
- 6th Guards, 279th and 331st Fighter Aviation Divisions
- 511th Reconnaissance Aviation Regiment
- 207th Fire Correction Aviation Regiment
- 95th Transport Aviation Regiment
- 44th Aviation Regiment of Civil Air Fleet

=== Subordinated units and groups ===
- 85th, 1001st Separate Medical Evacuation Aviation Regiment
- 714th Communications Aviation Regiment

== 3rd Ukrainian Front ==
=== 17th Air Army ===
- 10th Assault Aviation Corps
  - 136th Assault Aviation Division
  - 306th Assault Aviation Division
- 244th Bomber Aviation Division
- 189th Assault Aviation Division
- 194th, 288th, 295th Fighter Aviation Division
- 262nd Night Bomber Aviation Division
- 39th Reconnaissance Aviation Regiment
- 96th Fire Correction Aviation Regiment
- 227th Transport Aviation Regiment
- 3rd Separate Medical Evacuation Aviation Regiment
- 282nd Communications Aviation Regiment
- 1614th, 1615th, 1654th, 1676th, 1975th Anti-Aircraft Artillery Regiment
- Air Group of General-Major Vitruk (did not have contact with the enemy)
  - 10th Guards Assault Aviation Division
  - 236th Fighter Aviation Division

== Long Range Aviation (18th Air Army from December 1944) ==
- 1st Guards Bomber Aviation Corps
  - 11th and 16th Guards, 36th, 48th Bomber Aviation Divisions
- 2nd Guards Bomber Aviation Corps
  - 2nd, 7th, 13th and 18th Guards Bomber Aviation Division
- 3rd Guards Bomber Aviation Corps
  - 22nd Guards, 1st, 12th and 50th Bomber Aviation Divisions
- 4th Guards Bomber Aviation Corps
  - 14th and 15th Guards, 53rd, and 54th Bomber Aviation Divisions

=== Subordinated units and groups ===
- 45th Bomber Aviation Division
- 56th Long-Range Fighter Aviation Division

== Air Defence Forces for State Territory ==
A note regarding the use of "patrol Area of". The actual term used in the Russian order of battle is ob'yekty, which literally means 'objects'. However, in the military sense it can mean structures, and targets. One possible interpretation that can be offered to better define the use in English is that the meaning here is of the actual "area of responsibility" of the unit in terms of military installations, facilities, military logistics networks and other possible enemy targets. In this sense the meaning is more area-related then referring to a specific location, specifying the area that the air unit would have to cover.

- Western Front PVO
  - 2nd Corps PVO (Air Defence) Patrol Area of Leningrad Front
    - 106th Fighter Aviation Division
      - 145th and 147th Guards, 33rd, 115th, 445th Fighter Aviation Regiments
    - 124th Fighter Aviation Division
      - 126th, 416th, 964th, 966th Fighter Aviation Regiments
    - 441st Fighter Aviation Regiment (from the 125th Fighter Aviation Division)
  - 5th Corps PVO Patrol Area of 1st Belorussian Front - 826th Fighter Aviation Regiment (36th Fighter Aviation Division), 148th Fighter Aviation Division (148th Guards, 785th, 907th, 1006th Fighter Aviation Regiments), 320th Fighter Aviation Division (652nd, 862nd, 963rd Fighter Aviation Regiments)
  - 13th Corps PVO Patrol Area of Belorussian-Lithuanian military district - 125th Fighter Aviation Division (730th, 787th Fighter Aviation Regiments)
  - 14th Corps PVO Patrol Area of Belorussian-Lithuanian military district - 328th Fighter Aviation Division (722nd, 959th, 960th Fighter Aviation Regiments)
  - 79th Division PVO Patrol Area of Belorussian-Lithuanian military district - 144th Fighter Aviation Division, HQ Baranovichi (144th, 383rd, 439th Fighter Aviation Regiments), 495th Fighter Aviation Regiment (36th Fighter Aviation Division)
  - 82nd Division PVO (Air Defense) Patrol Area of 1st Belorussian Front - 36th Fighter Aviation Division (405th, 591st, 651st, 827th Fighter Aviation Regiments)
- South-Western Front PVO (Air Defense)
  - 7th Corps PVO (Air Defense) Patrol Area of Kiev and Kharkov Military Districts - 9th Fighter Aviation Corps (39th and 146th Guards, 573rd, 894th, 1007th Fighter Aviation Regiments)
  - 8th Corps PVO (Air Defense) Patrol Area of L'vov military district - 10th Fighter Aviation Corps (182nd, 266th, 628th, 631st, 961st Fighter Aviation Regiments)
  - 9th Corps PVO (Air Defense) Patrol Area of 2nd Ukrainian Front - 141st Fighter Aviation Division (234th, 586th, 933rd Fighter Aviation Regiments)
  - 12th Corps PVO (Air Defense) Patrol Area of 2nd Ukrainian Front - 2nd Guards Fighter Aviation Division (38th, 83rd and 84th Guards Fighter Aviation Regiments), 743rd Fighter Aviation Regiment (123rd Fighter Aviation Division)
  - 85th Division PVO (Air Defense) Patrol Area of Kharkov and Odessa military districts, Separate Coastal Army - 126th Fighter Aviation Division (802nd, 822nd, 833rd Fighter Aviation Regiments)
  - 86th Division PVO (Air Defense) Patrol Area of Odessa Military District - 123rd Fighter Aviation Division (417th, 965th Fighter Aviation Regiments)
  - 88th Division PVO (Air Defense) Patrol Area of 1st Ukrainian Front - 310th Fighter Aviation Division (268th, 348th, 908th Fighter Aviation Regiments)
  - Front Formations and units in Patrol Area of Moscow Military District - 127th Fighter Aviation Division (738th, 934th, 1003rd Fighter Aviation Regiments)
- Central Front PVO (Air Defense)
  - Leningrad Air Defence Army (Air Defense) Patrol Area of Leningrad Front - 2nd Guards Fighter Aviation Corps (11th, 25th, 27th, 102nd and 105th Guards, 403rd Fighter Aviation Regiments)
  - Moscow PVO Forces
    - 1st PVO Fighter Air Army (Air Defense) Patrol Area of Central Front PVO (Air Defense)
      - 104th Fighter Aviation Division (119th, 729th Fighter Aviation Regiments)
      - 122nd Fighter Aviation Division (767th, 768th, 769th Fighter Aviation Regiments)
      - 142nd Fighter Aviation Division (143rd, 423rd, 632nd, 786th, 1005th Fighter Aviation Regiments)
      - 317th Fighter Aviation Division (12th Guards, 488th, 736rd Fighter Aviation Regiments)
      - 318th Fighter Aviation Division (11th, 28th, 562nd, 565th, 740th Fighter Aviation Regiments)
      - 319th Fighter Aviation Division (16th, 67th, 177th, 178th, 309th Fighter Aviation Regiments)
- Patrol Area of Coastal PVO Army of Far-East Front - 147th Fighter Aviation Division (34th, 400th, 401st, 404th, 429th, 564th Fighter Aviation Regiments)
- Patrol Area of Amur Air Defence Army (Air Defense) of Far-Eastern Front - 149th Fighter Aviation Division (3rd, 18th, 60th Fighter Aviation Regiments)
- Patrol Area of Transbaikal PVO zone (Air Defense) of Transbaikal Front - 297th Fighter Aviation Division (938th, 939th Fighter Aviation Regiments)
- Independent PVO formations and units of the country
  - 99th Division PVO (Air Defense) Patrol Area of Transcaucasian Front - 298th Fighter Aviation Division (35th, 982nd, 983rd Fighter Aviation Regiments)
  - Baku Air Defence Army (Air Defense) Patrol Area of Transcaucasian Front - 8th Fighter Aviation Corps (82nd, 480th, 481st, 922nd, 962nd Fighter Aviation Regiments)

== STAVKA Reserve of Military High Command ==
=== 7th Air Army ===
- 280th Assault Aviation Division
- 257th Fighter Aviation Division
- 324th Fighter Aviation Division
- 80th Short-Range Bomber Aviation Regiment
- 114th Guards Long-Range Aviation Regiment
- 679th Night Bomber Aviation Regiment
- 716th Night Bomber Aviation Regiment
- 118th Reconnaissance Aviation Squadron
- 119th Reconnaissance Aviation Squadron
- 1599th Anti-Aircraft Artillery Regiment

=== 14th Air Army ===
- 107th Separate Signals Aviation Regiment
- 30th Civil Air Fleet Aviation Regiment

=== 18th Air Army ===
- 73rd Auxiliary Long-Range Aviation Regiment
- 742nd Long-Range Reconnaissance Aviation Regiment

=== Reserve Front ===
- 81st Medical Evacuation Aviation Regiment
- 121st Separate Signal Aviation Regiment

=== Independent Formations and units of Reserve of STAVKA Military High Command ===
- 114th Fighter Aviation Regiment
- 9th Guards Bomber Aviation Corps
  - 19th Guards Bomber Aviation Division
  - 20th Guards Bomber Aviation Division
  - 21st Guards Bomber Aviation Division
- 7th Assault Aviation Corps
  - 206th Assault Aviation Division
  - 289th Assault Aviation Division

== Military districts ==
- Moscow Military District
  - 2nd Special Destination Aviation Division
  - 4th Special Destination Aviation Division
  - 10th Guards Bomber Aviation Regiment
  - 860th Bomber Aviation Regiment
  - 252nd Separate Signal Aviation Regiment
  - 396th Separate Signal Aviation Regiment
  - 918th Separate Signal Aviation Regiment
  - 852nd Ferry Aviation Regiment
  - 853rd Ferry Aviation Regiment
  - 856th Ferry Aviation Regiment
  - 75th Corrective Aviation Squadron
- White Sea Military District
  - 261st Assault Aviation Division
  - 16th Guards Fighter Aviation Division
  - 108th Reconnaissance Aviation Squadron
- Belorussian-Lithuanian military district
  - 272nd Fighter Aviation Regiment
  - 2nd Medical Aviation Regiment
- Orel Military District
  - 1000th Assault Aviation Regiment
  - 857th Transport Aviation Regiment
- Kiev Military District
  - 15th Guards Assault Aviation Division
  - 245th Assault Aviation Regiment
  - 51st Fighter Aviation Regiment
  - 3rd Transport Aviation Regiment
- Lvov Military District
  - 5th Medical Aviation Regiment
- Odessa Military District
  - 48th Guards Reconnaissance Aviation Regiment
  - 222nd Ferry Aviation Regiment
- Kharkov Military District
  - 620th Assault Aviation Regiment
  - 254th Fighter Aviation Regiment
  - 896th Fighter Aviation Regiment
  - 926th Fighter Aviation Regiment
- Volga Military District
  - 220th Mixed Aviation Regiment
  - 217th Assault Aviation Regiment
  - 221st Ferry Aviation Regiment
  - 850th Ferry Aviation Regiment
  - 851st Ferry Aviation Regiment

== Inactive Fronts ==
=== Transcaucasus Front ===
==== Subordinated units and groups ====
- 492nd Assault Aviation Regiment
- 25th Fighter Aviation Regiment
- 167th Fighter Aviation Regiment
- 149th Reconnaissance Aviation Squadron
- 335th Long-range Reconnaissance Aviation Squadron

=== Central Asian Military District ===
- 333rd Assault Aviation Division
- 238th Fighter Aviation Division
- 15th Reconnaissance Aviation Squadron

=== Siberian Military District ===
- 9th Ferry Aviation Regiment

=== Transbaikal Front ===
==== 12th Air Army ====
- 30th Bomber Aviation Division
- 247th Bomber Aviation Division
- 248th Assault Aviation Division
- 316th Assault Aviation Division
- 245th Fighter Aviation Division
- 246th Fighter Aviation Division
- 12th Reconnaissance Aviation Regiment
- 23rd Heavy Bomber Aviation Squadron
- 40th Corrective Aviation Squadron
- 41st Corrective Aviation Squadron
- 144th Independent Anti-Aircraft Artillery Battery
- 145th Independent Anti-Aircraft Artillery Battery
- 146th Independent Anti-Aircraft Artillery Battery
- 147th Independent Anti-Aircraft Artillery Battery
- 148th Independent Anti-Aircraft Artillery Battery
- 149th Independent Anti-Aircraft Artillery Battery
- 150th Independent Anti-Aircraft Artillery Battery

=== Far Eastern Front ===
==== 10th Air Army ====
- 83rd Bomber Aviation Division
- 253rd Assault Aviation Division
- 29th Fighter Aviation Division
- 254th Fighter Aviation Division
- 528th Fighter Aviation Division
- 7th Reconnaissance Aviation Regiment
- 411th Corrective Reconnaissance Aviation Regiment
- 344th Transport Aviation Regiment

==== Subordinated units and groups ====
- 18th Aviation Corps
  - 96th Assault Aviation Division
  - 296th Fighter Aviation Division
- 777th Fighter Aviation Division
  - 140th Reconnaissnce Aviation Squadron
- 28th Fire Correction Aviation Squadron
- 19th Bomber Aviation Corps
  - 33rd Bomber Aviation Division
- 55th Bomber Aviation Division
- 442nd Long-range Bomber Aviation Regiment
- 443rd Long-range Bomber Aviation Regiment
- 128th Mixed Aviation Division
- 255th Mixed Aviation Division
- 799th Reconnaissance Aviation Regiment
- 19th Fighter Aviation Squadron

=== Coastal Group of Forces ===
==== 9th Air Army ====
- 34th Bomber Aviation Division
- 251st Assault Aviation Division
- 252nd Assault Aviation Division
- 32nd Fighter Aviation Division
- 249th Fighter Aviation Division
- 250th Fighter Aviation Division
- 6th Reconnaissance Aviation Regiment
- 464th Corrective Reconnaissance Aviation Regiment
- 281st Transport Aviation Regiment

== Source ==
- Combat Composition of the Soviet Army 1 May 1945
