= 86th Guards Fighter Aviation Regiment =

86th Guards Maritime Fighter Aviation Regiment (1989–1992) 86th Guards Fighter Aviation Regiment (1943–1989) 744th Fighter Aviation Regiment (1942–1943) 20th Fighter Aviation Regiment (1941–1942)
- Active: 1941–1992
- Country: Soviet Union (1941-1992); Moldova (1992-Present)
- Branch: Soviet Air Forces; Soviet Naval Aviation; Moldovan Air Force
- Type: Fighter Aviation regiment
- Garrison/HQ: Mărculești; MUN 06858
- Engagements: World War II; Transnistria War
- Decorations: Order of the Red Banner; Order of Suvorov 3rd class
- Battle honours: Borisov

The 86th Guards Fighter Aviation Regiment (Military Unit Number 06858; 86th Gv. (Guards) IAP) was an aviation regiment of the Soviet Air Forces, and after the dissolution of the Soviet Union, the main formation of the Moldovan Air Force.

The regiment traced its history back to the formation of the 20th Fighter Aviation Regiment (IAP) in mid-1941 after the beginning of the German invasion of the Soviet Union, Operation Barbarossa. The 20th IAP became the 744th IAP in January 1942 and then the 86th Guards IAP in May 1943, and operated the Yakovlev Yak-1, Yak-7, Yak-9, and Yak-3 fighters during the war. Postwar, the regiment was stationed in Germany before being moved to Mărculești in Moldova in 1950. It served as a fighter unit there for the rest of its existence and in 1989 was transferred to the Black Sea Fleet, becoming a Naval Aviation unit and adding "Maritime" to its name. In 1992, the regiment was transferred to the Moldovan Air Force, with which it saw little flight operation, as almost all of its aircraft were sold off to other countries. In Moldovan service, the regiment was converted into a mixed aviation brigade and then the Decebal Air Base in 1999.

== History ==
=== World War II ===
The regiment was formed between 14 July and 18 August 1941, training with the 8th Reserve Fighter Aviation Regiment of the Volga Military District. The IAP was organized according to shtat 015/134, equipped with Yakovlev Yak-1 fighters, and based at Bagay-Baranovka. Some of its pilots arrived from the Southwestern Front's 20th Fighter Aviation Regiment, and the new regiment temporarily took the number of the 20th IAP. After completing its formation, the 20th was sent into combat on 20 August as part of the 61st Mixed Aviation Division (SmAD) of the Air Force of the Bryansk Front (VVS), operating from the Alekhina-Mertvoye airfield. Two days later, a group led by Captain Vasily Dmitrievich Gulyayev downed a German Henschel Hs 126 observation aircraft near Mglin, the regiment's first known victory. On 18 January 1942, the 20th IAP was redesignated the 744th IAP by an order from the 61st SmAD. On 9 February, the regiment was pulled out of combat to receive replacements, part of the 1st Reserve Aviation Brigade of the Reserve of the Supreme High Command (RVGK), stationed in the Moscow Military District, remaining there until 18 February.

On 19 February, the regiment returned to the front, joining the VVS 1st Shock Army on the Northwestern Front. The 744th IAP was transferred to the 6th Air Army's 240th Fighter Aviation Division (IAD) of the front on 15 June. Between 7 November 1942 and 6 March 1943, the regiment was reorganized according to shtat 015/284 and reequipped with newer Yakovlev Yak-7B fighters at the rear airfield of Maksatikha. On 18 April, the regiment returned to the front with the 240th IAD, which had been transferred to the Leningrad Front's 13th Air Army. The 744th became an elite guards unit, the 86th Guards Fighter Aviation Regiment, on 1 May, for its "exemplary fulfillment of combat missions" and for "displaying courage and heroism" in the Siege of Leningrad. From 12 July to 24 August, the entire 240th IAD was withdrawn to the RVGK to reequip with the updated Yakovlev Yak-9 fighter. The 240th IAD was sent back to the front with the Kalinin Front's 3rd Air Army, with the regiment entering combat on 26 August in the Rzhev area. The regiment fought in Battle of Smolensk and the Nevel Offensive until October. On 20 October, the Kalinin Front became the 1st Baltic Front. The regiment was again pulled out of the frontline on 17 October to integrate new pilots into the regiment at Dobovitsy rear airfield, remaining there until 17 April 1944. While in the rear, the regiment was also reorganized according to shat 015/364.

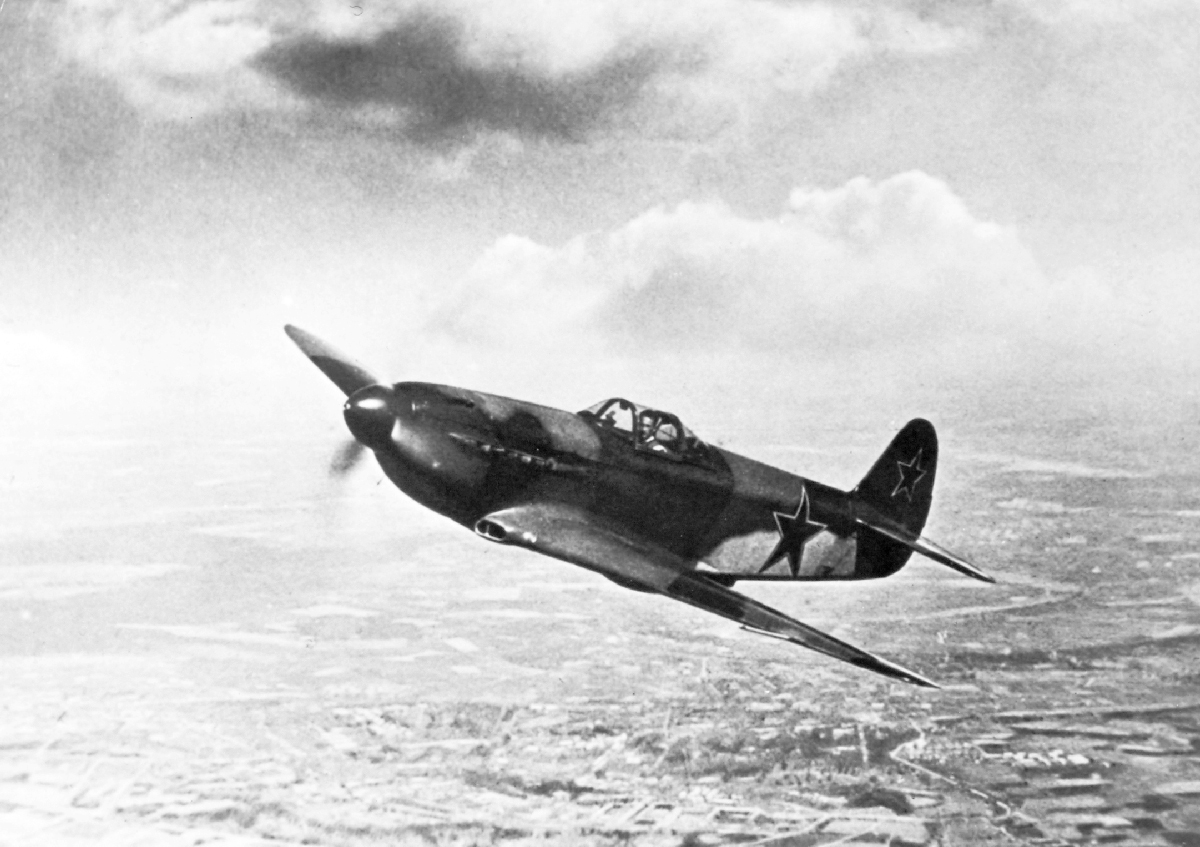
A Yakovlev Yak-3 of the type operated by the regiment

On 17 April, the 86th Gv. IAP returned to combat with the 240th IAD, which had been transferred to the 3rd Belorussian Front's 1st Air Army. The regiment and its division were briefly transferred to the 2nd Belorussian Front's 4th Air Army between 13 and 29 May. From late June, the 86th provided air support for advancing Soviet ground troops during Operation Bagration, the offensive that recaptured Belorussia and eastern Poland. On 10 July, for its actions in assisting the crossing of the Berezina River and the capture of Borisov, the regiment received the honorific "Borisov". On 23 July, the regiment was awarded the Order of the Red Banner for helping to capture Minsk during the Minsk Offensive early in the month. On 20 September, the regiment left for Saratov to receive new Yakovlev Yak-3 fighters from the city's Aircraft Plant No. 292, returning to the front on 15 October. In the spring of 1945, the regiment fought in the Battle of Königsberg during the East Prussian Offensive, for which it was awarded the Order of Suvorov, 3rd class, on 17 May. On 14 April, the 240th IAD was transferred to the 1st Belorussian Front's 16th Air Army in preparation for the upcoming Berlin Offensive, during which it provided air support for the Soviet advance. The regiment left the active army on 9 May after the surrender of the German forces. During the war, the regiment flew 10,865 sorties, reported shooting down 393 enemy aircraft, and destroyed 40 on the ground for a total of 433 destroyed aircraft. This came at a cost of 120 downed aircraft and 71 pilots killed, divided as follows: 22 in aerial combat, 33 failed to return, 7 in air raids and other non-combat losses, and 9 died in crashes and of wounds.

=== Cold War ===
The regiment spent the early postwar period on occupation duty in Germany. Immediately after the end of the war in May 1945, the regiment was based at Oranienburg, but moved to Großenhain in August. In 1947, it was transferred to Köthen, and two years later relocated to Falkenberg. In February 1949, the 240th IAD became the 119th IAD, part of the 24th Air Army (later the 16th Air Army). The 86th Gv. IAP received Mikoyan-Gurevich MiG-15 jet fighters in 1949, and on 24 October 1951 transferred with the 119th IAD to Mărculești air base in the Moldavian Soviet Socialist Republic, where the division became part of the 48th Air Army (the 5th Air Army from 1968). Between 1954 and 1955, the regiment converted to newer Mikoyan-Gurevich MiG-17 fighters, and in 1964 received the Mikoyan-Gurevich MiG-21PF fighter, operating the MiG-21PFM variant from 1966 and the MiG-21bis from 1974. From April 1960, the regiment was tasked with protecting Soviet airspace, and participated in numerous large-scale exercises.

By the 1980s, in event of a war with NATO, the regiment, as part of the 119th IAD, was to protect infrastructure and military bases in southwestern Ukraine and Moldova from airstrikes. In addition, plans were made to use the division to blockade the Bosporus and Dardanelles Straits. 86th Guards IAP aircraft were nuclear-capable, and according to a different plan, the regiment was to move to bases in Bulgaria and Romania in event of conflict and launch strikes on Turkish airfields with Tactical nuclear weapons from there. It was assumed that after such an attack, the aircraft would land in Bulgaria, and for testing cooperation, exercises were held during the 1980s, during which a squadron of the 684th Guards Fighter Aviation Regiment landed in Bulgaria.

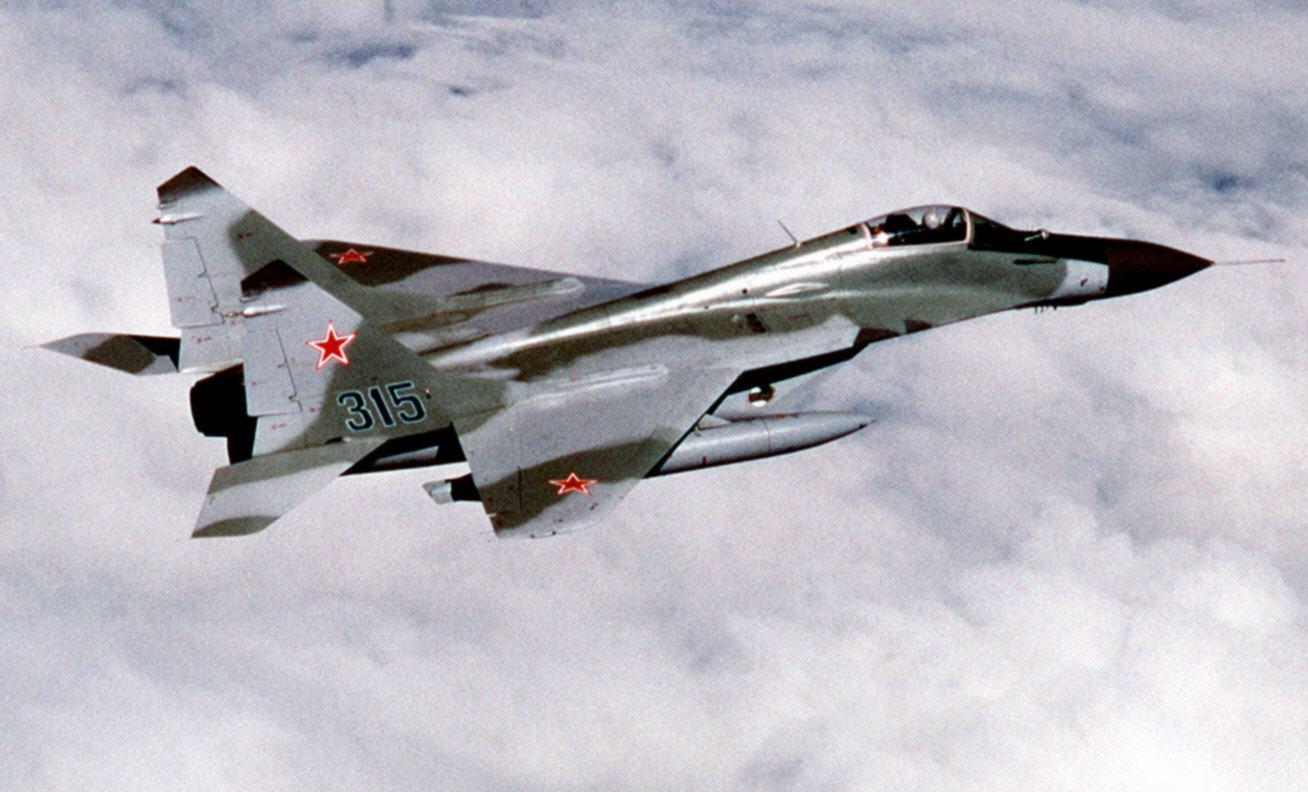
A MiG-29 of the type operated by the regiment

On 24 October 1989, the regiment and the 119th IAD were transferred to the VVS Black Sea Fleet in order to evade Mikhail Gorbachev's force size restrictions on the Soviet Air Force, and the 86th became a Maritime Fighter Aviation Regiment. The 86th thus became the first Naval Aviation Regiment to be equipped with the MiG-29 when it received the new fighters a few months later to replace its obsolete MiG-21s. The first MiG-29 flight at Mărculești was made on 15 June 1989. On 24 April 1990, the regiment lost a MiG when its pilot flew it into the ground during night exercises, although the pilot ejected and survived. The commander of the 2nd Squadron, Lieutenant Colonel Alexander Gidik, was killed in the crash of his MiG after he lost control near the airfield on 25 May. Around the same time, the regiment received two MiG-29UB trainers. With its conversion to the MiG-29, the regiment's mission changed to that of protecting the Black Sea Fleet and its bases, although it was stationed 300 kilometers from the coast. In November 1990, according to CFE Treaty data, the 86th Guards Maritime IAP had a strength of 33 MiG-29s.

=== Moldovan service ===
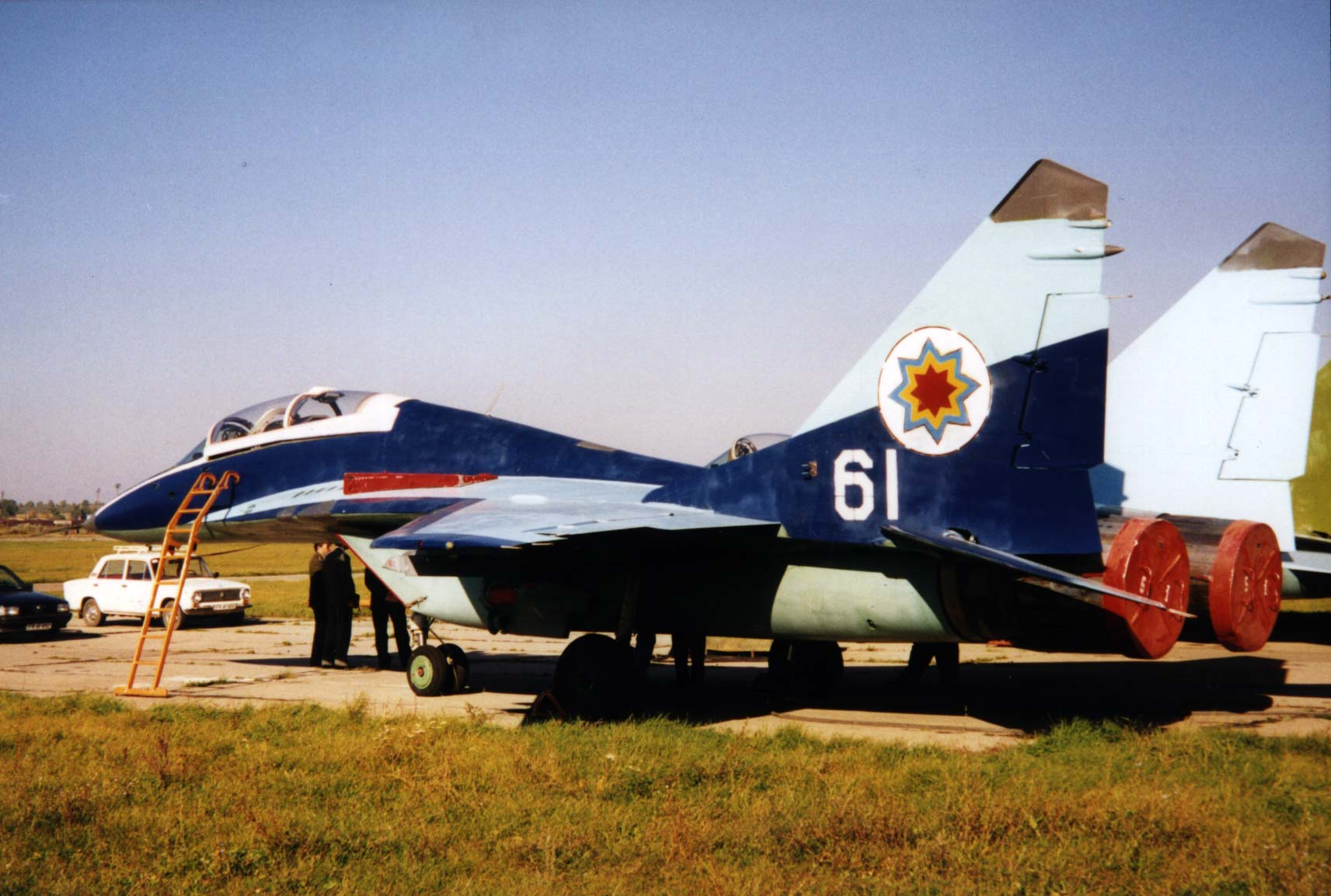
A Moldovan Air Force MiG-29UB training aircraft of the brigade being prepared for shipment to the United States, 1997

Emblem of the Decebal Aviation Brigade

On 12 April 1992, the regiment became part of the Moldovan Air Force. Most of the regiment's non-Moldovan personnel, including all of its pilots and its commander, Colonel Vladimir Koval, departed for their home countries after its transfer. These were replaced by Moldovan personnel returning from service in the Soviet Armed Forces, among whom there were not many pilots, even fewer of whom could fly MiG-29s. It was commanded by Colonel Ion Rotaru, who was soon replaced by Colonel Vasile Braghiş. On 26 May, the first pilots arrived, Vitalie Rusu and Alexandru Popovici, who were later joined by Sveatoslav Neburac and Alexandru Dărănuţă. During the Transnistria War, on 22 June 1992, a flight of two MiG-29s, Rusu leading and Neburac as wingman, bombed a bridge across the Dniester, connecting Bender and Parcani. None of the bombs directly hit the bridge, although the 14th Guards Army claimed that the bombs had caused civilian casualties and that their anti-aircraft fire downed one of the fighters. Moldova denied the loss, and Moldovan Air Force records show that all of the MiG-29s returned to the base after the mission.

Eventually, a squadron of 16 pilots was formed, but this was not enough for a full-strength regiment, and it was converted into a three-squadron mixed aviation brigade on 16 October 1992. The three squadrons were equipped with the MiG-29, Mil Mi-8 transport helicopter, and Mil Mi-24 attack helicopter, respectively, although the 3rd Squadron later disbanded as a result of a shortage of Mi-24s. Soon after its conversion into a brigade, the unit was renamed the Decebal Aviation Brigade, after ancient Dacian king and national hero Decebalus, as a result of a desire to move away from the Soviet past. Over the 1990s, all but six of the MiG-29s were sold to various foreign countries, including the United States. On 23 December 1999 it became the Decebal air base. After years of inactivity, the six remaining MiG-29s, which were supposed to have been sold to Belarus, became unserviceable, and after efforts to find a buyer for them beginning in 2010 were unsuccessful, it was announced that they would be scrapped if no buyer could be found.

== Aircraft operated ==
Aircraft operated by 20th IAP/744th IAP/86th Guards IAP, data from
From	To	Aircraft	Version
July 1941	1942	Yakovlev Yak-1	
November 1942	1943	Yakovlev Yak-7	Yak-7B
July 1943	1944	Yakovlev Yak-9	
October 1944	1950	Yakovlev Yak-3	
1949-1950	1955	Mikoyan-Gurevich MiG-15	
1954	1966	Mikoyan-Gurevich MiG-17	
1966	1988	Mikoyan-Gurevich MiG-21	MiG-21PF (1964), MiG-21PFM (1966), MiG-21bis (1974)
1989	1992	Mikoyan MiG-29	included several MiG-29UB

== Commanders ==
The following officers commanded the regiment during World War II:

- Captain (promoted to Major and Lieutenant Colonel) Semyon Naidenov (14 July 1941 – captured 15 September 1943)
- Lieutenant Colonel Vladimir Chistyakov (25 October 1943 – 31 December 1945)

The following officers commanded the regiment during the late 1980s and early 1990s:

- Lieutenant Colonel Yury Komissarov (acting; Unknown–March 1989)
- Lieutenant Colonel Pyotr Rudenko (March 1989–Unknown)
- Colonel Vladimir Koval (Unknown–April 1992)

The following officers commanded the regiment, brigade, and Decebal Air Base from 1992:

- Colonel Ion Rotaru (1992)
- Colonel Vasile Braghiş (1992–Unknown)
- Colonel Oleg Coroi
- Colonel Sergiu Ciobanu (2000–2004)
- Colonel Sveatoslav Neburac (2004–Unknown)
- Lieutenant Colonel Oleg Mititelu
