= 1st Guards Composite Aviation Division =

226th Assault Aviation Division (1942–1943) 1st Guards Assault Aviation Division (1943–1956) 1st Guards Fighter-Bomber Aviation Division (1957–1989) 1st Guards Bomber Aviation Division (1989–1993) 1st Guards Assault Aviation Division (1993–2009)
- Active: 1942–2009
- Country: Soviet Union (until 1991); Russia
- Branch: Soviet Air Forces (until 1991); Russian Air Force
- Type: Mixed Aviation Division
- Part of: 4th Air and Air Defence Forces Army
- Garrison/HQ: Yeysk (2002–2009)
- Engagements: World War II; Battle of Stalingrad; Crimean Offensive; East Prussian Offensive; Battle of Königsberg
- Decorations: Order of Lenin; Order of the Red Banner (2); Order of Kutuzov, 2nd Class; Order of Suvorov, 2nd Class
- Honorifics: Stalingrad

The 1st Guards Stalingrad Composite Aviation Division (Russian: 1-я гвардейская бомбардировочная Сталинградская ордена Ленина дважды Краснознаменная орденов Суворова и Кутузова авиационная дивизия) was an Aviation Division of the Russian Aerospace Forces. It was originally formed as the 226th Assault Aviation Division in May 1942 and became the 1st Guards Stalingrad Assault Aviation Division for its performance in the Battle of Stalingrad. The division fought in the Melitopol Offensive, Crimean Offensive, East Prussian Offensive and the Battle of Königsberg. By the end of the war, the division had been awarded the Order of the Red Banner twice, the Order of Lenin and the Orders of Kutuzov and Suvorov 2nd class. Postwar, the division relocated to Belarus. In April 1956, it became a bomber division but was converted to a fighter-bomber unit in 1957. In 1989, it became a bomber unit again and moved to Krasnodar in 1993. At Krasnodar it became an assault unit. The division moved to Yeysk in 2002 and disbanded in 2009.

== History ==
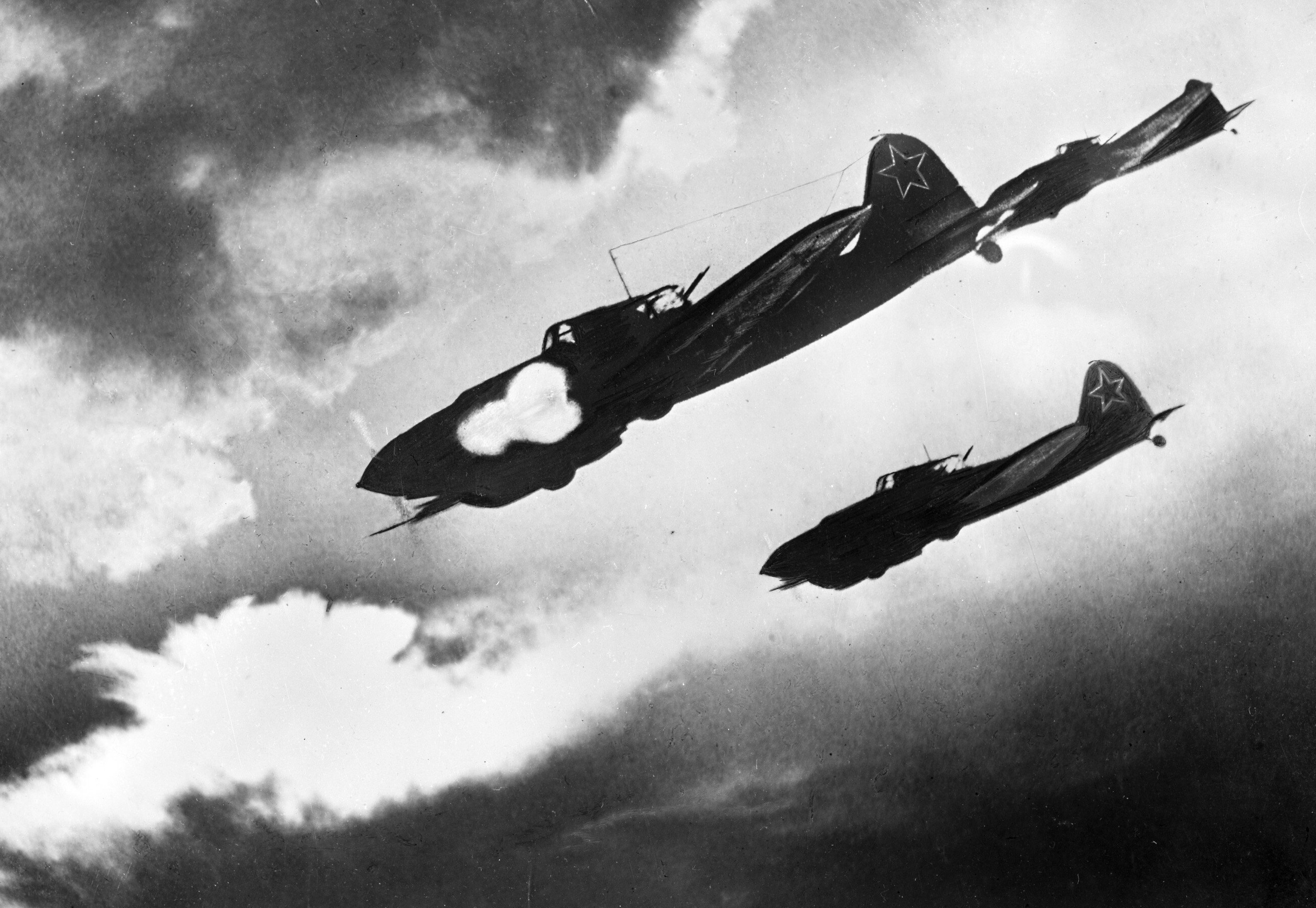
Ilyushin Il-2 attack

The 1st Guards Bomber Aviation Division was initially formed as the 226th Assault Aviation Division as part of the 8th Air Army in May 1942. The 8th Air Army was supporting the Southwestern Front as it fought the German advance during Operation Blau.

On 18 March 1943 the division was renamed the 1st Guards Assault Aviation Division. By this time the 8th Air Army was part of Southern Front and included the 2nd Mixed Aviation Corps (201st Fighter Aviation Division, 214th Assault Aviation Division), 10th Mixed Aviation Corps (206th, 287th Fighter Aviation Divisions, 289th Assault Aviation Division), 270th Bomber Aviation Division, 2nd Guards Night Bomber Aviation Division, 6th Guards Fighter Aviation Division, 8th Reconnaissance Aviation Regiment, 406th Light Bomber Aviation Regiment, and the 678th Transport Aviation Regiment.

Organization in May 1945 (Ketrzyn, Poland):

- 74th Guards Assault Aviation Regiment with Il-2
- 75th Guards Assault Aviation Regiment with Il-10
- 76th Guards Assault Aviation Regiment with Il-2
- 136th Guards Assault Aviation Regiment with Il-2

The division headquarters were moved from Ketrzyn to Lida, Grodno Region, in the Belorussian SSR, in July 1945.

The 76th Guards Assault Aviation Regiment was disbanded in April 1947.

In 1957, it was renamed 1st Guards Fighter-Bomber Aviation Division (1st IBAD, from 11 November 1976 1st ADIB).

Organization 1957:

- 136th Guards Fighter-Bomber Aviation Regiment (Lida, Grodno Region) with MiG-15
- 686th Guards Fighter-Bomber Aviation Regiment (Lida, Grodno Region) with MiG-15
- 952nd Fighter-Bomber Aviation Regiment (Pruzhany) with MiG-15

Organization 1970:

- 911th Fighter-Bomber Aviation Regiment (Lida, Grodno Region) with MiG-17
- 940th Fighter-Bomber Aviation Regiment (Postavy, Vitebsk Oblast) with MiG-17
- 953rd Fighter-Bomber Aviation Regiment (Bobrovichi, Gomel Oblast) with Su-7

In 1978 the 953rd Regiment was reequipped with Sukhoi Su-24s and renamed a Bomber Aviation Regiment. In 1980 the 953rd Bomber Aviation Regiment was transferred to the 32nd Bomber Aviation Division, 24th Air Army.

The division was renamed the 1st Guards Bomber Aviation Division in 1989.

Organization 1990:

- 116th Guards Bomber Aviation Regiment (Ross, Grodno Region) with Su-24 – January 1992 taken over by the Belarus Air Force. October 1993 renamed 116th Guards Bomber Aviation Base, and in July 1994 116th Guards Bomber-Reconnaissance Aviation Base - disbanded August 2010.
- 305th Bomber Aviation Regiment (Postavy, Vitebsk Oblast) with Su-24 – withdrawn to Krasnodar, Krasnodar Krai, in 1993, and disbanded
- 497th Bomber Aviation Regiment (Lida, Grodno Region) with Su-24 – withdrawn to Krasnodar, Krasnodar Krai, in 1993, and disbanded.

The Divisional headquarters was moved to Krasnodar, Krasnodar Krai, in 1993, and the division became part of the 4th Army of Air Forces and Air Defence.

It was disbanded in December 2009.
