= 240th Fighter Aviation Division =

Soviet Air Forces division

The 240th Fighter Aviation Division (240 IAD) was a fighter aircraft formation of the Soviet Air Forces during World War II. It saw its most eventful actions during that war, and in 1949 became the 119th Fighter Aviation Division.

== History ==
=== World War II ===
The division was formed in May 1942.

The 744th Fighter Aviation Regiment (744 IAP) was transferred to the 240th Fighter Aviation Division (part of 6th Air Army) of the front on 15 June 1942. Between 7 November 1942 and 6 March 1943, 744 IAP was reorganized according to shtat 015/284 and reequipped with newer Yakovlev Yak-7B fighters at the rear airfield of Maksatikha. On 18 April, the regiment returned to the front with the 240th IAD, which had been transferred to the Leningrad Front's 13th Air Army. The 744th became an elite guards unit, the 86th Guards Fighter Aviation Regiment, on 1 May, for its "exemplary fulfillment of combat missions" and for "displaying courage and heroism" in the Siege of Leningrad. From 12 July to 24 August, the entire 240th IAD was withdrawn to the RVGK to reequip with the updated Yakovlev Yak-9 fighter. The 240th IAD was sent back to the front with the Kalinin Front's 3rd Air Army, with the regiment entering combat on 26 August in the Rzhev area. The regiment fought in Battle of Smolensk and the Nevel Offensive until October. On 20 October, the Kalinin Front became the 1st Baltic Front. The regiment was again pulled out of the frontline on 17 October to integrate new pilots into the regiment at Dobovitsy rear airfield, remaining there until 17 April 1944. While in the rear, the regiment was also reorganized according to shat 015/364.

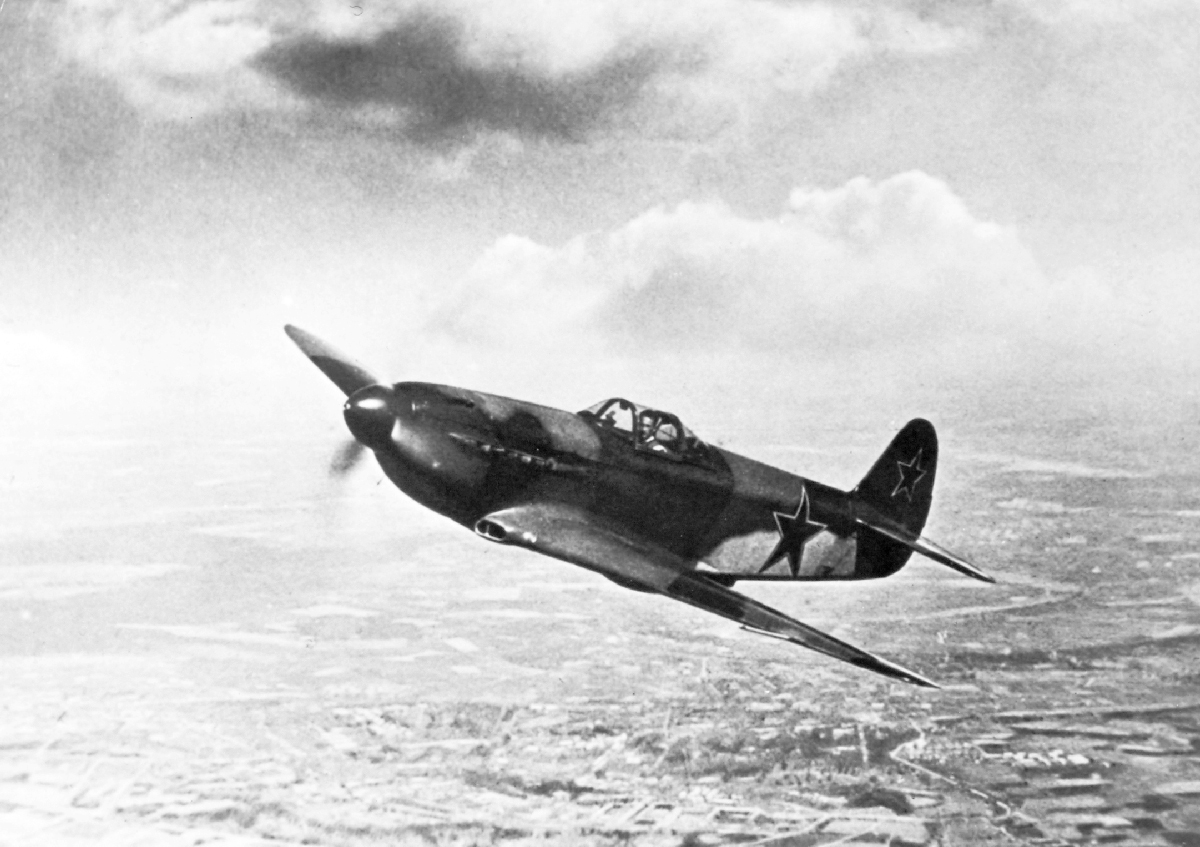
A Yakovlev Yak-3 of the type operated by the 86th Guards Fighter Aviation Regiment

On 17 April, the 86th Gv. IAP returned to combat with the 240th IAD, which had been transferred to the 3rd Belorussian Front's 1st Air Army. The regiment and its division were briefly transferred to the 2nd Belorussian Front's 4th Air Army between 13 and 29 May. From late June, the 86th provided air support for advancing Soviet ground troops during Operation Bagration, the offensive that recaptured Belorussia and eastern Poland. On 10 July, for its actions in assisting the crossing of the Berezina River and the capture of Borisov, the regiment received the honorific "Borisov". On 23 July, the regiment was awarded the Order of the Red Banner for helping to capture Minsk during the Minsk Offensive early in the month. On 20 September, the regiment left for Saratov to receive new Yakovlev Yak-3 fighters from the city's Aircraft Plant No. 292, returning to the front on 15 October. In the spring of 1945, the regiment fought in the Battle of Königsberg during the East Prussian Offensive, for which it was awarded the Order of Suvorov, 3rd class, on 17 May. On 14 April, the 240th IAD was transferred to the 1st Belorussian Front's 16th Air Army in preparation for the upcoming Berlin Offensive, during which it provided air support for the Soviet advance. The regiment left the active army on 9 May after the surrender of the German forces. During the war, the regiment flew 10,865 sorties, reported shooting down 393 enemy aircraft, and destroyed 40 on the ground for a total of 433 destroyed aircraft. This came at a cost of 120 downed aircraft and 71 pilots killed, divided as follows: 22 in aerial combat, 33 failed to return, 7 in air raids and other non-combat losses, and 9 died in crashes and of wounds.

In May 1945, the division, located at Oranienburg, East Germany, consisted of the:

- 86th Guards Fighter Aviation Regiment (Oranienburg, East Germany) with Yak-3
- 133rd Guards Fighter Aviation Regiment (Wensickendorf, East Germany) with Yak-9
- 900th Fighter Aviation Regiment (Oranienburg, East Germany) with Yak-9

By the end of the war the division had fought in the Demyansk Pocket, Battle of Smolensk (1943), Dukhovshchina–Demidov Offensive, Nevel Offensive, Operation Bagration, Vitebsk–Orsha Offensive, Minsk Offensive, Vilnius Offensive, Kaunas Offensive, Battle of Memel, Gumbinnen Operation, East Prussian Offensive, Battle of Königsberg, Samland Offensive, and Battle of Berlin.

=== Cold War ===
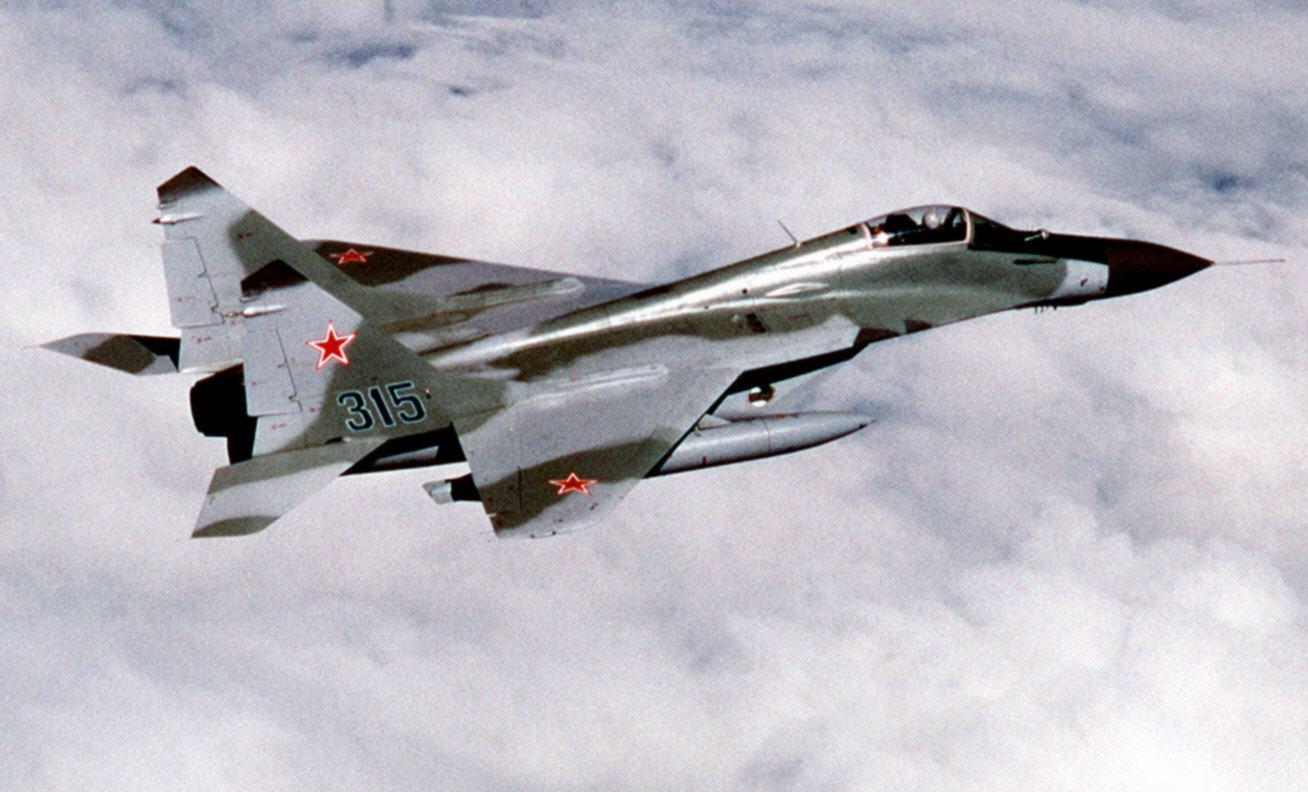
A Mikoyan MiG-29 of the type operated by the 86th Guards Fighter Aviation Regiment

In February 1949, the 240th IAD became the 119th IAD, part of the 24th Air Army (later the 16th Air Army). The 86th Gv. IAP received Mikoyan-Gurevich MiG-15 jet fighters in 1949, and on 24 October 1951 transferred with the 119th IAD to Mărculești air base in the Moldavian Soviet Socialist Republic, where the division became part of the 48th Air Army (the 5th Air Army from 1968). Between 1954 and 1955, the regiment converted to newer Mikoyan-Gurevich MiG-17 fighters, and in 1964 received the Mikoyan-Gurevich MiG-21PF fighter, operating the MiG-21PFM variant from 1966 and the MiG-21bis from 1974. From April 1960, the regiment was tasked with protecting Soviet airspace, and participated in numerous large-scale exercises.

By the 1980s, in event of a war with NATO, plans were made to use the division to blockade the Bosporus and Dardanelles Straits. 86th Guards IAP aircraft were nuclear-capable, and according to a different plan, the regiment was to move to bases in Bulgaria and Romania in event of conflict and launch strikes on Turkish airfields with Tactical nuclear weapons from there. It was assumed that after such an attack, the aircraft would land in Bulgaria, and for testing cooperation, exercises were held during the 1980s, during which a squadron of the 684th Guards Fighter Aviation Regiment landed in Bulgaria. On 24 October 1989, the 119th IAD were transferred to the VVS Black Sea Fleet in order to evade Conventional Forces in Europe force size restrictions on the Soviet Air Force.

The division was disbanded in 1992, with one regiment going to Moldova, another to Ukraine, and another disbanding in Georgia.
