= 61st Guards Fighter Aviation Corps =

The 61st Guards Fighter Aviation Corps was a corps of the Soviet Air Forces from 1949 to 1980.

It was originally formed on 10 September 1942 as the 1st Fighter Aviation Corps. The 1st Fighter Aviation Corps headquarters was formed from that of the 1st Fighter Aviation Army. Army commander Major General Yevgeny Beletsky was retained as the corps commander. After the completion of its formation and receiving new units, the corps was sent to the Kalinin Front, joining the 3rd Air Army. Between November 1942 and January 1943 its units supported the troops of the front in the Velikiye Luki Offensive. In February 1943, the corps, operating jointly with the 1st Assault Aviation Corps of the army, supported the Northwestern Front in the Demyansk offensive. For successful operations in the latter it became the 1st Guards Fighter Aviation Corps on 18 March 1943. After the conclusion of the offensive the corps was withdrawn to the Reserve of the Supreme High Command in March, then in May joined the 15th Air Army of the Bryansk Front, participating in the Orel Offensive and the Bryansk offensive. The units of the corps participated in battles for air superiority, covering the troops of the Bryansk Front and the right wing of the Central Front.

In November the corps returned to the 3rd Air Army and participated in the Smolensk operation, the Nevel Offensive, and the winter 1943–1944 Polotsk and Gorodok offensives over eastern Belarus. In June 1944 the corps was transferred to the 1st Air Army of the 3rd Belorussian Front, participating in the liberation of Belorussia and Latvia, covering the troops of the front in the Vitebsk–Orsha offensive, the Minsk offensive, and the Vilnius offensive. For its successful completion of assigned tasks in the battles for the liberation of Minsk the corps received the name of that city as an honorific. In July 1944 the corps was transferred back to the 3rd Air Army, now under the 1st Baltic Front, with which it participated in the Šiauliai offensive, the Baltic offensive, and the East Prussian offensive. During April and May 1945 the corps fought in the Berlin Offensive as part of the 16th Air Army of the 1st Belorussian Front.

In 1945 it had:

- 3rd Guards Fighter Aviation Division (Ludwigslust, Germany)
- 4th Guards Fighter Aviation Division (Werder, Germany) (64th, 65th, and 66th Guards Fighter Aviation Regiments, 3 April 1945)

The corps was under the command of General Lieutenant of Aviation E.M. Beletsky.

In June 1945 the 240th Fighter Aviation Division in Oranienburg, Germany, was added to the corps.

The 3rd Guards Fighter Aviation Division left the corps in September 1948.

On 10 January 1949, a decree was issued renaming the formation the 61st Guards Fighter Aviation Corps. This took effect in February 1949. At the same time, its parent formation changed the designation from the 16th to the 24th Air Army.

The 131st Fighter Aviation Division arrived from Poland in October 1949 and joined the corps.

In 1980 the corps was disbanded by being re-designated a mobilization aviation corps.
