= 7th Assault Aviation Corps =

- 7 ShAK
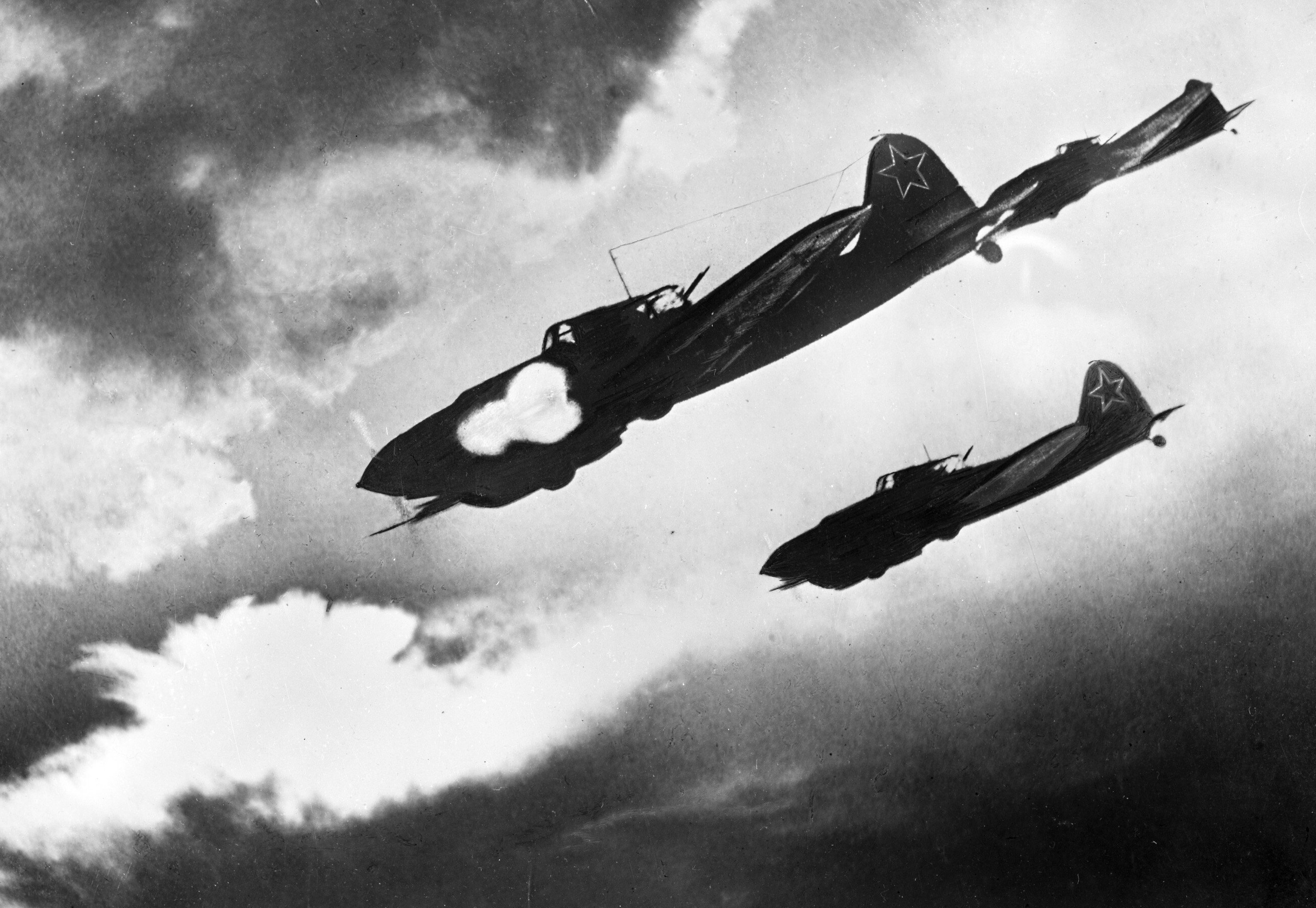
- Il-2 attack
- Active: 1943-1949
- Disbanded: 10 January 1949
- Country: Soviet Union
- Branch: Air Force
- Engagements: World War II

The 7th Assault Aviation Corps (7 ShAK) was an aviation corps of the Red Army Air Force that fought in World War II.

== Names ==
- 10th Mixed Aviation Corps
- 7th Assault Aviation Corps
- 7th Sevastopol Assault Aviation Corps
- 68th Sevastopol Assault Aviation Corps

== History ==
The 7th Assault Aviation Corps was formed on 21 July 1943 from the 10th Mixed Aviation Corps. The corps included the 206th and the 289th Assault Aviation Divisions. From mid-July, the corps fought in the Mius Offensive, the destruction of the German forces around Taganrog, the recapture of the Donbass, and the offensive to the Molochnaya. In October, the corps fought in the breakthrough of German defenses on the Molochnaya and the pursuit of Axis troops to the Dnieper.

During January and February 1944, as part of the 8th Air Army of the 4th Ukrainian Front, the corps fought in the elimination of the Nikopol bridgehead and supported the ground troops of the 3rd Guards Army in the recapture of Nikopol and the securing of a bridgehead on the right bank of the Dnieper. In April, the corps fought in the breakthrough of Axis defenses on the Perekop isthmus and Sivash, and from 10 April to 10 May supported ground troops in the recapture of Sevastopol during the Crimean Offensive. It received the Sevastopol honorific on 10 May for the "massive heroism" of its aviators in the "liquidation of the last Hitlerite center of resistance in Crimea."

In August, the corps was relocated to the 14th Air Army of the 3rd Baltic Front, where it fought in fierce battles on the Tartu and Riga axis. The 7th ShAK was then transferred to the 1st Baltic Front, joining the 3rd Air Army, where until late in the year it fought in fierce battles on the Memel, Tilsit and Libava axis. Until the end of the war, the corps supported the 1st and 2nd Baltic Fronts in the destruction of the Courland Pocket. The corps was withdrawn to the Reserve of the Supreme High Command on 16 April 1945. During the campaign in the Baltic, the corps flew 16,450 combat sorties and was credited with the destruction of 312 tanks and self-propelled guns, 533 anti-aircraft guns, 6,415 vehicles, 23 steam locomotives, 200 wagons, 724 field and anti-tank artillery guns, 208 aircraft, and inflicting 11,835 casualties on Axis personnel.

From July to September 1945, the corps was relocated to the Lvov Military District as part of the 14th Air Army. The corps was renumbered as the 68th Assault Aviation Corps on 10 January 1949.

== Operational army ==
- From 21 July 1943 to 16 May 1944, just 301 days
- From 17 August 1944 to 16 April 1945, just 243 days,

Total: 544 days

== Subordinations ==
Unit	Period
8th Air Army, Southern Front	07/21/1943 - 10/20/1943
8th Air Army, 4th Ukrainian Front	20/10/1943 - 16/05/1944
Reserve of the Supreme High Command	05/16/1944 - 06/01/1944
Air Force Kharkov Military District	06/01/1944 - 17/08/1944
14th Air Army, 3rd Baltic Front	08/17/1944 - 01/10/1944
3rd Air Army, 1st Baltic Front	01/10/1944 - 02/01/1945
15th Air Army, 2nd Baltic Front	02/01/1945 - 03/01/1945
15th Air Army, Courland Army Group, Leningrad Front	03/01/1945 - 16/04/1945
Reserve of the Supreme High Command	04/16/1945 - 06/10/1945
14th Air Army, Carpathian Military District	06/10/1945 - 02/20/1949
57th Air Army, Carpathian Military District	02/20/1949 - 04/01/1956

== Composition ==
- 206th Melitopol Red Banner Assault Aviation Division
  - 503rd Order of Kutuzov Attack Aviation Regiment
  - 686th Sevastopol Red Banner Attack Aviation Regiment (1944-1945)
  - 806th Order of Suvorov Attack Aviation Regiment
  - 807th Sevastopol Attack Aviation Regiment
- 289th Nikopol Red Banner Assault Aviation Division
  - 232nd Attack Aviation Regiment
  - 686th Sevastopol Red Banner Attack Aviation Regiment (1943-1944)
  - 947th Sevastopol Attack Aviation Regiment
- 236th Fighter Aviation Division (21 July–August 1943, January–May 1944)
