= Jüterbog Airfield =

Former airfield in Jüterbog, Germany

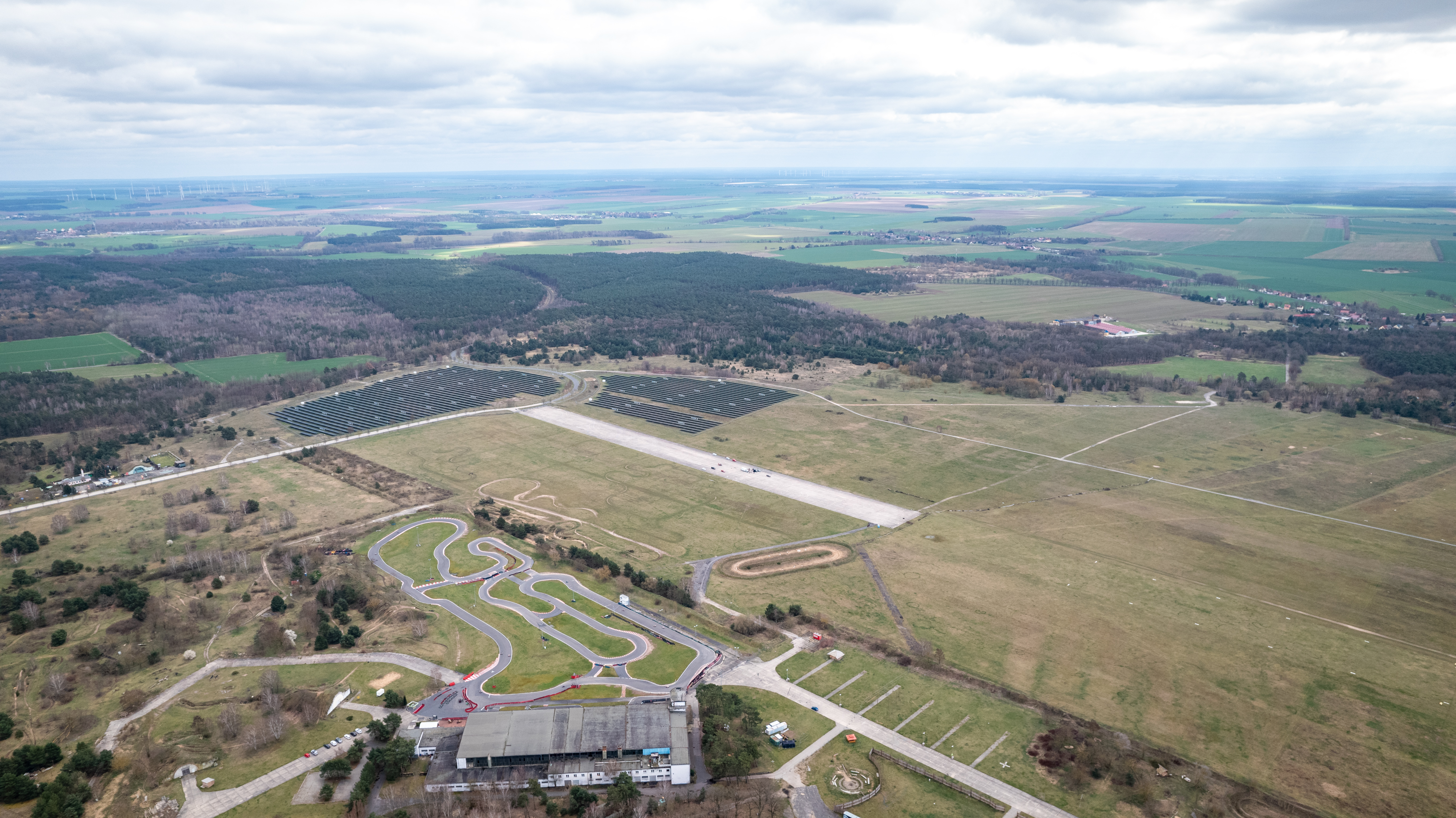
- Airfield in April 2023
- IATA: none; ICAO: none

Summary
- Location: Jüterbog, Germany
- Built: 1916
- In use: 1916 - present
- Occupants: 1916-1945 German Luftwaffe; 1945-1992 Soviet 16th Air Army
- Coordinates: 51.9964°N 12.984°E

Map
- Location of airport in Brandenburg Jüterbog Airfield (Germany)

Runways
| Direction | Length | | Surface |
| Direction | ft | m | Surface |
|---|---|---|---|
| 10/28 | | 1,050 | concrete |

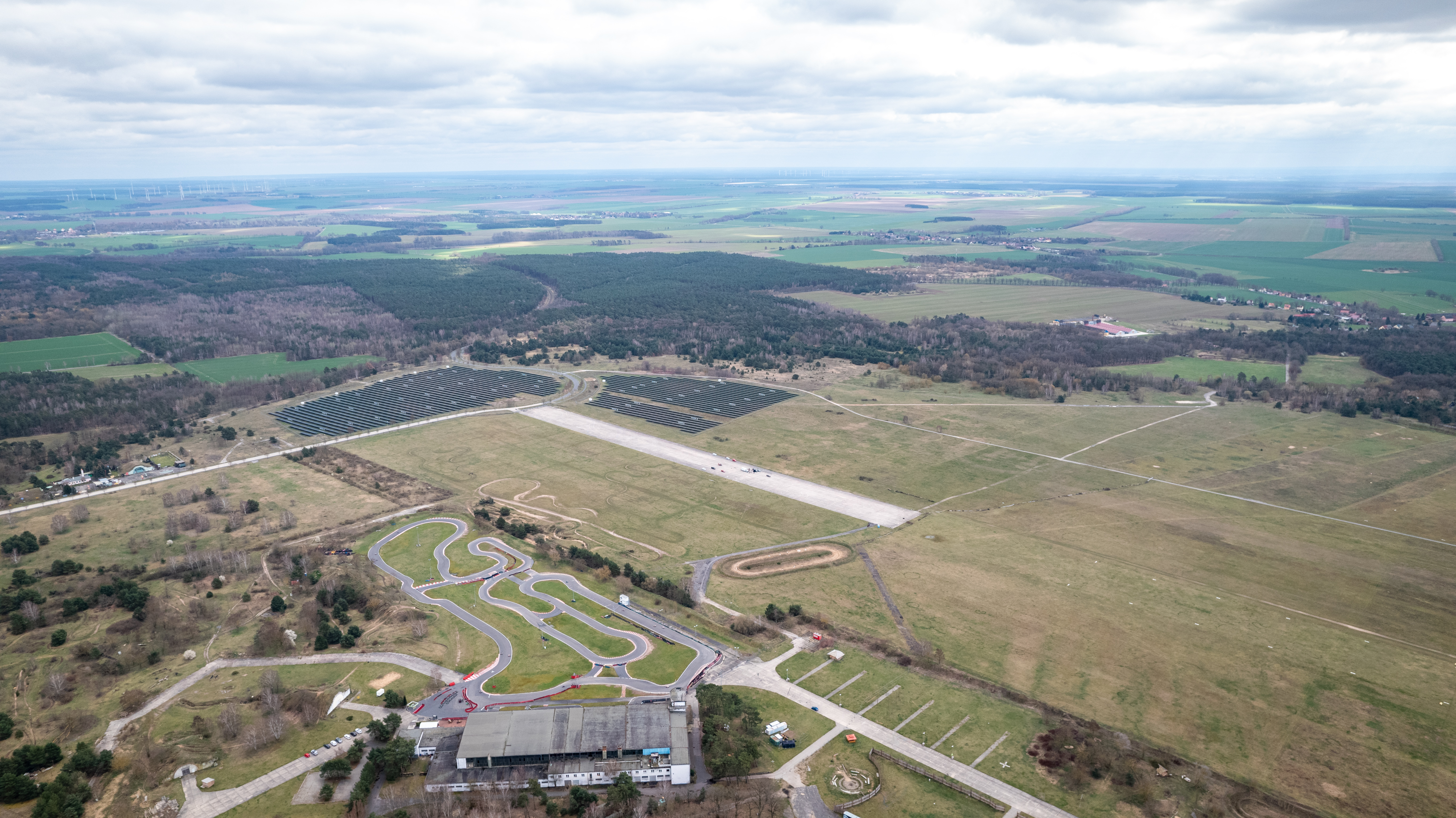
Jüterbog Airfield

Jüterbog Airfield (also known as Altes Lager airfield) was a military air base located west of the town of Jüterbog, in Brandenburg, Germany. Nowadays paragliders and hang gliders start from Altes Lager.

== History ==
Developed as part of the Nazi Germany's programme to develop the German population's flying skills in preparation for war, it was opened as a glider training establishment. Taken over by the Luftwaffe in 1933, it was fully developed as a military airfield.

After being overrun by the Red Army in May 1945, towards the end of World War II, it came under the control of the occupying forces of the Soviet Union. From this point forward, several units of the Soviet Air Force were stationed at the site. After extending the runway to 2,600 metres (8,500 ft), the Soviet military added an anti-aircraft missile site 5.6 kilometres (3.5 mi) west of the near Lindow. The 833rd Fighter Aviation Regiment (833 IAP) was initially equipped with the Mikoyan MiG-9, later replaced by the Mikoyan MiG-23MLD „Flogger-K" fighter and Mikoyan-Gurevich MiG-23UM "Flogger-C" operational trainer. The regiment was part of the 16th Guards Fighter Aviation Division within the 16th Air Army with headquarters in Damgarten.

With the reunification of Germany on 3 October 1990, the Soviet Armed Forces agreed to return all bases by the end of 1994. The airfield was handed back to the district authorities in 1992.

== Nellis AFR copy ==
Experts suggest that the airfield has been copied by the United States Air Force, as part of its Tolicha Peak Electronic Combat Range (TPECR), in the western part of the Nevada Test and Training Range.

Located 7 kilometres (4.3 mi) northwest of the TPECR is an airfield target (N3722 W11650), designated "Eastman Airfield Target", "Target 76-14", or the "Korean Airfield". However, it has a northeastern taxiway loop which is characteristical for Jüterbog, and three ramps in front of hangars on the western side of the loop. The other taxiways have a similar layout, although the runway is about 400 metres (1,300 ft) shorter. There are two accompanying SAM sites, one 2.5 kilometres (1.6 mi) northwest of the airfield, and one 5.6 kilometres (3.5 mi) northwest just like the original.
