= Sergei Rudenko (general) =

Soviet military commander

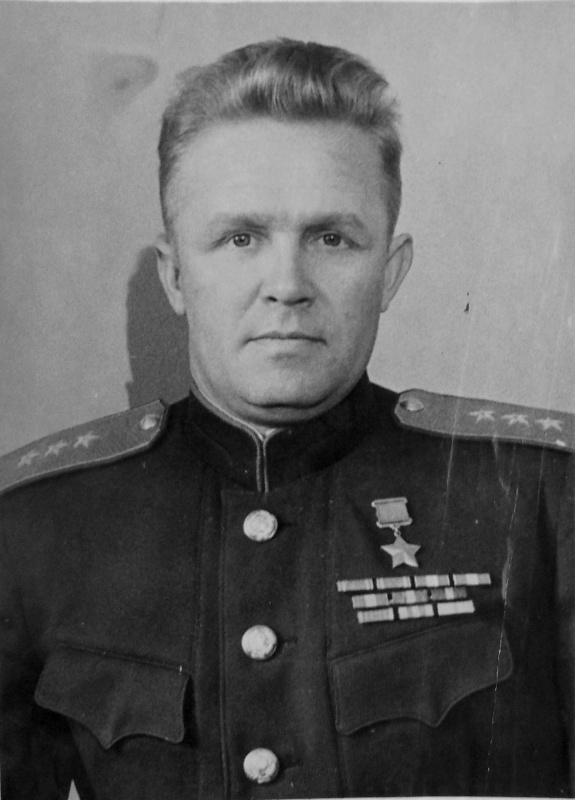
- Born: 20 October 1904; Korop, Russian Empire
- Died: 10 July 1990 (aged 85); Moscow, Soviet Union
- Burial place: Novodevichy Cemetery
- Military career
- Allegiance: Soviet Union (1923–1990)
- Service years: 1923 – 1990
- Rank: Marshal of the aviation
- Commands: 16th Air Army; Soviet Airborne Troops
- Conflicts: World War II
- Awards: Hero of the Soviet Union

Sergei Ignatevich Rudenko (Russian: Сергей Игнатьевич Руденко; Ukrainian: Сергій Гнатович Руденко, romanized: Serhii Hnatovych Rudenko; 20 October [O.S. 7 October] 1904 – 10 July 1990) was a Soviet Marshal of the aviation.

== Biography ==
=== Early life ===
A shoemaker's son, Rudenko volunteered into the Red Army in 1923. At 1926 he completed his studies in the Leningrad Military Theoretical Flight School and graduated from the Crimea Military Flight Academy a year later. At 1928 he joined the Communist Party. From 1932, Rudenko commanded a reconnaissance squadron. At 1936 he matriculated from the Zhukovsky Air Force Engineering Academy, and was soon appointed commander of the 118th Bomber Brigade.

In January 1941, Rudenko was put in charge of the 31st Air Division of the Western Special Military District, an office he held when Germany invaded the Soviet Union.

=== World War II ===
In November 1941 he was transferred to command the Air Forces of the 20th Army, and on December he was assigned to supervise the Air Forces of the 61st Army.

In January the following year, Rudenko was made chief of the air component in the Kalinin Front. From April to June he headed the 1st Air Operations Group at the Stavka, and then posted as deputy commander of the air component in the Southwestern Front.

In October 1942, Rudenko assumed command over the 16th Air Army. Under his leadership, the Army participated in the battles of Stalingrad, Kursk, Belorussia, Poland, Pomerania and Berlin - as part of the air component in the Stalingrad, Don, Central and Belorussian (later, 1st Belorussian) Fronts.

On 11 May 1944 Rudenko was promoted to Colonel-General. On 19 August that year, he was awarded the title Hero of the Soviet Union (Medal no. 3087).

=== Post-war career ===
Rudenko remained in charge of the 16th Army until February 1947, when he was appointed a commander of an airborne corps. (In April 1948, the New York Times reported that Rudenko would appear in a libel case in Paris on behalf of the defendant, French Communist Les Lettres Françaises, against Victor Kravchenko.) From December 1948, Rudenko commanded the Soviet Airborne Troops. In September 1949, he became Chief of Staff and First Deputy to the Supreme Commander of the Air Force. At 11 March 1955, he received his final promotion to Marshal of the Aviation. From May 1968 to August 1973, Rudenko headed the Gagarin Military Academy and then became an inspector in the Ministry of Defense.

He was also a deputy in the 2nd and 6th Convocations of the Supreme Soviet, and candidate member of the Central Committee in the years 1961–66.

== Personal life and death ==
Rudenko died on 10 July 1990. He was buried at Novodevichy Cemetery.

== Honours and awards ==
Rudenko was awarded:

- Hero of the Soviet Union,
- six Orders of Lenin,
- four Orders of the Red Banner,
- Orders of Suvorov, 1st (twice) and 2nd classes,
- Order of Kutuzov, 1st class,
- Order of the October Revolution,
- Order of the Patriotic War, 1st class,
- Order for Service to the Homeland in the Armed Forces of the USSR, third class,
- campaign and jubilee medals
- and foreign orders.
