= 6th Guards Fighter Aviation Division =

6th Guards Don-Szeged Red Banner Order of Kutuzov Fighter Aviation Division
- Active: 1943–1991
- Country: Soviet Union
- Branch: Soviet Air Force
- Type: Fighter
- Size: 103 combat aircraft (1990)
- Part of: 16th Air Army (1968–1991)
- HQ: Merseburg (1951–1991)
- Engagements: World War II
- Decorations: Order of the Red Banner; Order of Suvorov
- Honorifics: Don; Szeged

Commanders
- Notable commanders: Boris Sidnev; Iosif Geybo

Aircraft flown
- Fighter: MiG-29

The 6th Guards Don-Szeged Red Banner Order of Suvorov Fighter Aviation Division was a fighter aviation division of the Soviet Air Force during World War II and the Cold War. The division was formed in early 1943 from the 268th Fighter Aviation Division, which distinguished itself in the Battle of Stalingrad. After the end of the war, the division was stationed in East Germany from 1951 to the end of the Cold War.

== World War II ==
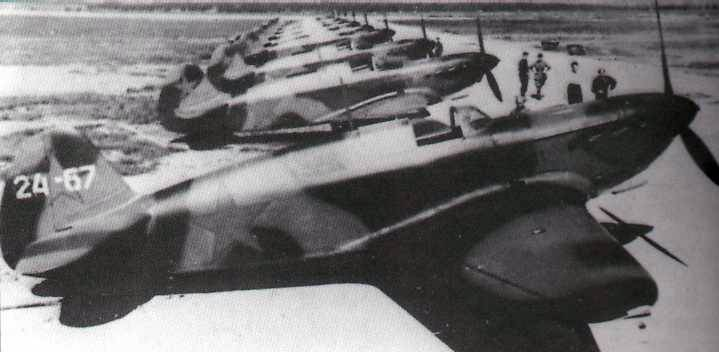
Yak-1s of the type flown by the division

The division was formed in June 1942 as the 268th Fighter Aviation Division (IAD) from the maneuver aviation group of the Air Force of the Southwestern Front. The division was initially commanded by Lieutenant Colonel Andrey Ryazanov, who was replaced by Colonel Boris Sidnev in early July. Between June and December, as part of the 8th Air Army (transferred to the Stalingrad Front on 12 July), the 268th IAD was involved in heavy fighting on the Kharkov axis and the Battle of Stalingrad. During this period, it flew 5,278 combat sorties and was credited with the destruction of 229 aircraft. The Yak-1-equipped 273rd Fighter Aviation Regiment (IAP) of the maneuver aviation group became the first regiment to join the division on 12 June and on the next day another Yak-1 regiment, the 659th, joined the division together with the LaGG-3-equipped 9th Guards IAP. The 659th and 9th Guards were fresh units who had returned from rebuilding in the rear. By the end of 30 June, the division had just 21 serviceable aircraft left out of 41 on hand, although the other fighter divisions of the 8th Air Army were equally reduced. The 659th and 875th IAP had no serviceable aircraft while the 9th Guards and 512th IAPs had ten and seven serviceable LaGG-3s, respectively, while the 273rd IAP had four serviceable Yak-1s. The 659th IAP was sent to the rear for rebuilding on 5 July, being replaced the next day by the 297th IAP with LaGG-3s. The 297th was itself destroyed and sent to the rear for new aircraft by 28 July. Another LaGG-3 regiment, the fresh 440th IAP, joined the division on 26 July, but was virtually destroyed, being reduced to two serviceable LaGG-3s by the time it handed these over to the 9th Guards IAP and went to the rear on 20 August. The LaGG-3-equipped 512th IAP became part of the 268th on 19 June, but on 20 July transferred to the 220th IAD of the 8th Air Army. The 268th IAD received the 296th IAP with Yak-1s from the 200th IAD on 6 August.

The 273rd, 296th and the 9th Guards IAPs were not immune to the attrition, being kept combat effective only due to considerable reinforcements; the 9th Guards IAP lost 65 LaGG-3s in the first few months of combat. It was pulled out of action on 18 September for rebuilding, receiving the Yak-1 in the rear of the front. The Yak-1 equipped 11th IAP and the Kittyhawk-equipped 126th IAP, which had been part of the Moscow air defenses, joined the division on 28 August, but the 126th returned to the Moscow air defenses on 12 September. The 11th IAP would suffer most of its 62 combat losses at Stalingrad and on 25 December turned over its remaining aircraft and pilots to the 31st Guards IAP. The 274th IAP with Yak-1s and Yak-7bs was transferred to the division on 23 October, but on 4 January 1943 left its pilots with the other regiments of the division and was sent to the rear for rebuilding. During the Battle of Stalingrad, the division also included a penal fighter aviation squadron formed on 18 September for pilots and mechanics accused of crimes, which was disbanded on 15 November.

The 273rd IAP became the 31st Guards IAP on 22 November for "exemplary fulfillment of combat missions." The 9th Guards IAP, now an aces' regiment, returned to the division with Yak-1s on 10 December. The 2nd IAP with Yak-1s was transferred to the 268th on 1 January 1943. In late January and February, the division and the other fighter units of the 8th Air Army provided air cover for the ground troops of the Southern Front in the Donbass offensive operation. For "successful completion of objectives and demonstrated heroism of its personnel," the 268th IAD was converted into the elite 6th Guards Fighter Aviation Division on 18 March, and was awarded the honorific Don on 4 May 1943. The 296th IAP also became the 73rd Guards IAP and the 2nd IAP became the 85th Guards IAP on 18 March. The 31st, 73rd, and 85th Guards IAPs would remain with the division for the rest of the war. The 9th Guards IAP was rearmed with the American-provided Lend-Lease Airacobra in early August 1943.

From December 1943 to February 1944, the division repulsed German airstrikes against the troops of the 4th Ukrainian Front during the Nikopol–Krivoi Rog offensive. In early February, Colonel Iosif Geybo replaced Sidnev, who had been promoted to corps command. During the Crimean offensive, its pilots escorted the bomber and ground attack aircraft of the 8th Air Army and provided air cover to the ground forces of the front in the breakthrough of the Perekop isthmus and the south coast of the Sivash, in addition to the pursuit of the retreating Axis troops. For "successful completion of objectives in the liberation of Simferopol and its courage and heroism," the 6th Guards IAD was awarded the Order of the Red Banner on 24 April. After the Crimean Offensive the 9th Guards IAP departed the division on 25 May to become one of the first units to receive the new La-7. During July and August the division, now with the 2nd Air Army, fought in the Lvov–Sandomierz offensive, providing air cover to the 1st Ukrainian Front.

From October 1944 to May 1945, the 6th Guards IAD was part of the 3rd Guards Fighter Aviation Corps of the 5th Air Army of the 2nd Ukrainian Front. During this period, it participated in the Debrecen Offensive, the Budapest offensive, the Vienna offensive, and the Prague offensive, during which it flew 4,654 combat sorties and was credited with the destruction of 147 aircraft. For its contribution to the capture of Szeged, the division received the Seged honorific on 31 October 1944. It was further decorated with the Order of Suvorov, 2nd class, on 4 June 1945 for its "successful completion of combat missions" in the capture of Jaroměřice, Znojmo, Hollabrunn, and Stockerau.

During the war, the pilots of the division flew about 40,000 combat missions. Division commander Colonel Iosif Geybo and sixteen pilots were awarded the title Hero of the Soviet Union.

== Cold War ==
In August 1945, the division was relocated from Czechoslovakia to the Odessa Military District, where its regiments received the American-provided Lend-Lease Kingcobra during mid-1946. The division and its regiments transferred from the 48th Air Army to the 24th Air Army (renumbered as the 16th Air Army 1968) of the Group of Soviet Forces in Germany during October 1951. Over the first several months in Germany, the regiments of the division entered the jet age when they were re-equipped with the MiG-15. For the remainder of the Cold War, the division was based at Merseburg airfield where its 85th Guards IAP was stationed. The 31st Guards IAP relocated to Falkenberg in 1956, where it remained until 1993. The 968th was transferred to the division in 1989 from Ros in Belarus where it had been stationed under the disbanded 95th Fighter Aviation Division of the 26th Air Army, and based at Altenburg. According to 19 November 1990 data released under the Treaty on Conventional Armed Forces in Europe, the division had a strength of 93 MiG-29 fighters between the three fighter regiments, 31 to each regiment, and ten MiG-23UM trainer aircraft.

In 1991, the division headquarters was withdrawn to Ivano-Frankivsk, where it came under Ukrainian control as part of the 14th Air Corps. The Soviet titles were removed from its designation and it was renamed the 6th Fighter Aviation Division. During this period it included the 9th (the former 894th IAP PVO) and 114th Fighter Aviation Regiments. The 114th Fighter Aviation Regiment was transferred to the division from the 4th IAD on 1 June 1992. A decree issued by President Leonid Kuchma on 30 November 2000 restored the division's Soviet titles (Ukrainian: 6 гвардійська винищувальна авіаційна Донська Сегедська орденів Червоного Прапора і ордена Суворова дивізія). The division headquarters was disbanded during the transition of the Ukrainian Air Force to a brigade-based structure, in which the 114th became the 114th Fighter Aviation Brigade on 15 October 2003.
