= 6th Assault Aviation Corps =

6th Assault Aviation Corps (1943–1949) 75th Assault Aviation Corps (1949–1956)
- Active: 1943-1956
- Country: Soviet Union
- Branch: Soviet Air Force
- Type: Assault Aviation
- Part of: 16th Air Army (1945–1949)
- Garrison/HQ: Finsterwalde (1945–1956)
- Engagements: World War II; Operation Bagration; Lublin-Brest Offensive; Vistula-Oder Offensive; East Pomeranian Offensive; Berlin Offensive
- Decorations: Order of the Red Banner
- Battle honours: Lublin

Commanders
- Notable commanders: Semyon Getman

Aircraft flown
- Attack: Ilyushin Il-2; Ilyushin Il-10

The 6th Assault Aviation Corps was a ground attack formation of the Red Air Force in the Second World War. The corps formed in December 1943. Among the formations part of the corps were the 197th, 198th, 2nd Guards, and 11th Guards Assault Aviation Divisions. It fought in Operation Bagration, the Lublin–Brest Offensive, the Vistula–Oder Offensive, the East Pomeranian Offensive, and the Berlin Offensive. For its actions during World War II the corps was awarded the honorific title "Lublin" and the Order of the Red Banner. Postwar, it was stationed in what would become East Germany. On 10 January 1949 the corps became the 75th Lublin Red Banner Assault Aviation Corps. It was disbanded in 1956 due to the obsolescence of its attack aircraft.

== World War II ==
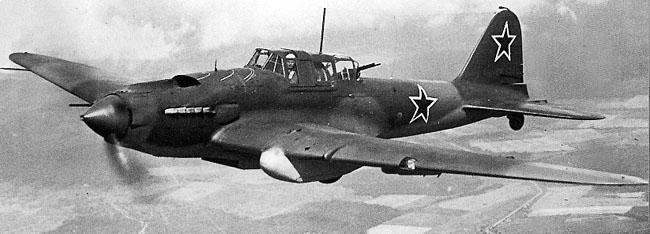
Ilyushin Il-2 attack aircraft of the type used by the corps

The corps was formed by an order of the NKO (People's Commissariat of Defence) dated 30 December 1943. In early August 1944 the corps, with the 197th (Colonel Timofeyev) and 198th (Colonel Belousov) Assault Aviation Divisions, was assigned to the 16th Air Army. All the personnel of these formations had good preparation and great combat experience. By 29 July the troops of the 69th Army, advancing on the left flank of the front, seized a bridgehead on the Vistula in the Pulawy area. Beginning on 1 August, the 8th Guards Army crossed the Vistula at Magnuszew. The divisions of the corps covered the ground troops from the air. By 14 August, the arrival of more fuel supplies and end of problems resulting from quick movement of the corps had changed the air situation in Soviet favor. By mid-August the troops of the 8th Guards Army, reflecting the numerous counterattacks and overcoming the fierce resistance of the enemy, with the help of air support not only held, but also expanded the Magnuszew bridgehead to a width of 20 to 25 kilometers and a depth of up to 15 kilometers. During this period, the corps supported the troops of the 28th and 70th Armies in repulsing German counterattacks in multiple areas to the east and northeast of the Warsaw suburb Praga. For its actions in the battles in this area the corps was given the honorific title "Lublin".

On 3 September, the corps provided air support for the troops of the 48th and 65th Armies advancing towards Pultusk, resulting in the crossing of the Narew and capture of bridgeheads on the river's western bank. In October, elements of the corps were sent into the reserve for replenishment at airfields in the Brest area. From November 1944, the corps, as part of the 16th Air Army, as well as the troops of the 1st Belorussian Front of Georgy Zhukov, began preparations for a new offensive, the Vistula–Oder Offensive.

In November, the commander of the front troops set interacting compounds ground and air forces. After that their commanders were able to work out in detail the procedure for joint action in special classes and practically on the ground, with respect to the nature of the upcoming military operations. Having a pre-task, they have developed jointly with the staffs of the interaction of the plans for the first days of operation, command and control instruments and signal table.

Following the command of the front war game with the commanders and chiefs of Army Staff, heads of operational divisions, reconnaissance and communications 25 - December 27, 1944 the commander of the 16th Air Army had such teaching with the commanders and chiefs of staff air corps and divisions. The game was held on the real plan of the forthcoming operation and pursuing such objectives: clarification of problems in operations, training in assessing the situation and deciding, improvement of cooperation between the Aviation and clans with moving troops relocation in aviation operations, as well as aviation and reconnaissance control. The exercise commander gave practical guidance on the application of all types of aircraft in the forthcoming operation. It was a rehearsal of the tasks set by the commander of the troops of the front to the Air Force.

At the beginning of January 1945 the commanders of groups of all regiments left on the cutting edge, where he studied the terrain and the location of enemy firepower. The final link in the preparation of commanders of groups air divisions intelligence commander was conducted from the air shortly before to clarify the goals and methods of action for them.

== Postwar ==
The corps was based at Finsterwalde from the summer of 1945. Its 197th and 198th Assault Aviation Divisions became part of other units. The 2nd and 11th Guards Assault Aviation Divisions became part of the corps. On 10 January 1949 it was redesignated the 75th Assault Aviation Corps. At the same time the 2nd was renumbered as the 114th Guards and the 11th became the 200th Guards. On 20 April 1956 the corps was disbanded and its two divisions transferred and reequipped with the Mikoyan-Gurevich MiG-15 due to the obsolescence of the Ilyushin Il-10.

== Operational army ==
The corps was part of the operational army (ru:Действующая армия) from:

- February 1, 1944 to March 25, 1944, just 54 days
- July 7, 1944 to September 8, 1944, just 62 days
- November 25, 1944 to May 9, 1945, just 166 days

Total: 282 days

== Corps command ==
=== Corps commanders ===
- Major General Aviation Boris Tokarev (30 December 1943-February 1946)
- Major General Aviation Pyotr Kuchma (April 1947-October 1948.)
- Hero of the Soviet Union Major General Aviation Semyon Getman (October 1948-February 1949)
- Colonel Alexey Valkov (February 1949-March 1951)
- Colonel Nikolay Terekhov (February 1951-April 1954)

=== Deputy corps commanders ===
- Colonel Leonid Alexeyevich Chizhikov (November 1949-November 1954)
