= Bobrovichi (air base) =

- IATA: none; ICAO: XMGB

Summary
- Coordinates: 52°16′43″N 29°21′24″E

Map
- Location of airport in Belarus Bobrovichi (Europe)

Runways
Direction	Length		Surface
Direction	ft	m	Surface
	8,202	2,500	Concrete

Bobrovichi is an air base in Belarus located 16 km northeast of Kalinkavichy in Gomel Region. It is nearby Bobrovichi town (ru:Бобровичи (Гомельская область)).

It is a large airfield with two large tarmacs on either side, and two alert revetments holding about 10 fighters each. It was home to the 953rd Bomber Aviation Regiment (953 BAP) flying Sukhoi Su-24 aircraft from 1978. The regiment was subordinated to 1st Guards Bomber Aviation Division in Lida (1960-1980) and then 32nd Bomber Aviation Division (1980-1992). It also hosted 368th Independent Shturmovik Aviation Regiment (368 OShAP) during the mid-1980s (to 1988).

The 953rd Bomber Aviation Regiment in 1994 transferred to Kamenka, Penza Oblast, and was absorbed by the 20th Guards Fighter-Bomber Aviation Regiment.
