= Mărculești Air Force Base =

Mărculești Airbase Baza aeriana Mărculești
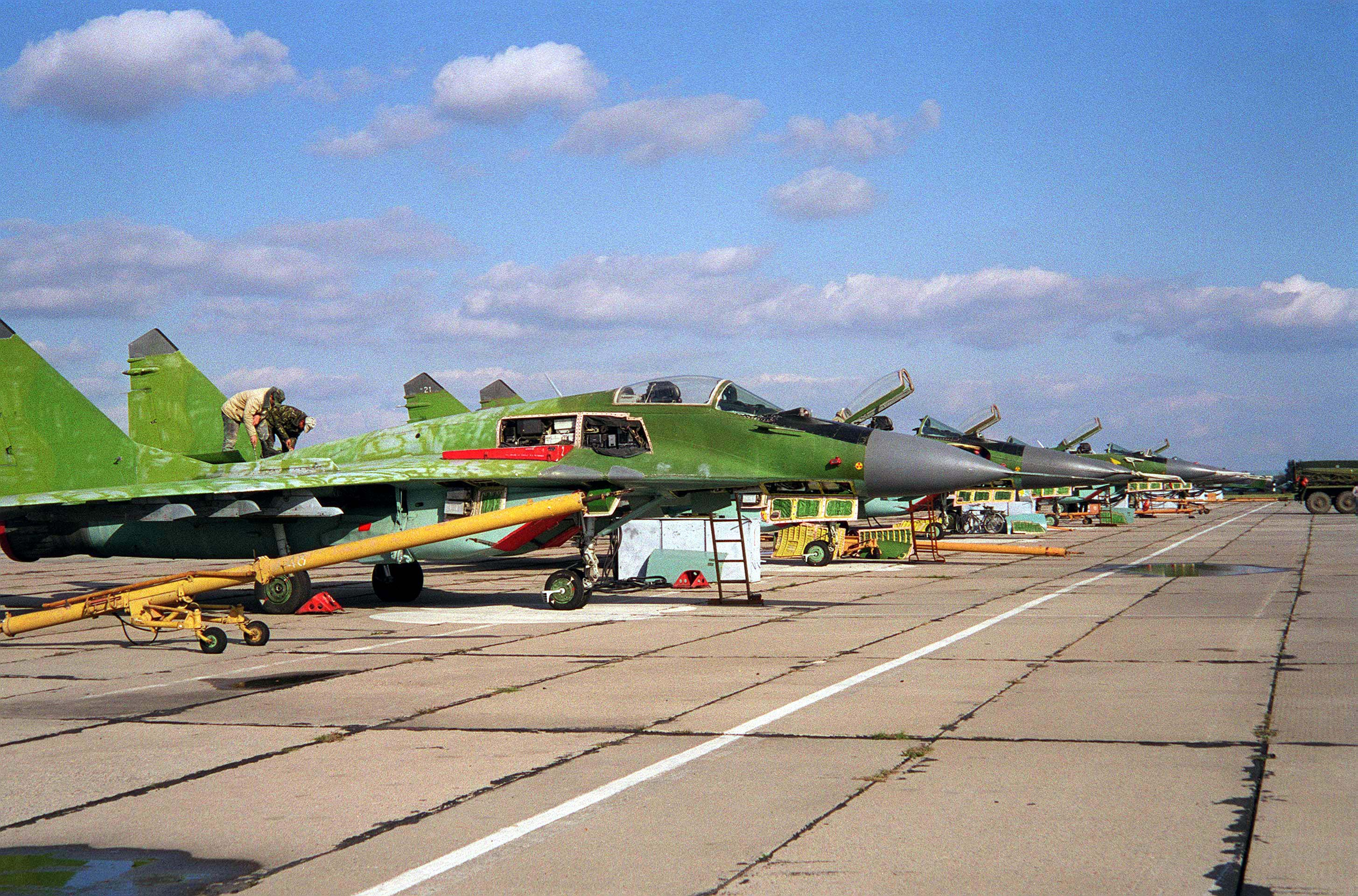
- IATA: none; ICAO: LUBM

Summary
- Airport type: Public
- Owner: Ministry of Defense of the Republic of Moldova
- Operator: State Enterprise Aeroportul International Marculesti
- Serves: Florești
- Location: Mărculești
- Elevation AMSL: 101 m / 331 ft
- Coordinates: 47°51′45″N 28°12′45″E
- Website: airportmarculesti.com
- Interactive map of Mărculești Airbase

Runways
Direction	Length		Surface
Direction	m	ft	Surface
07/25	2,512	8,241	Concrete

Mărculești Airbase (Romanian: Baza aeriana Mărculești) (ICAO: LUBM) is an air base of the Moldovan Air Force, located in Florești district, in the north of Moldova.

== Aircraft on display ==
=== Active ===
- 3 Mi-8
- 1 Mi-17
- 2 AN-2
- 1 AN-26

=== Stored ===
- 1 An-30
- 6 MiG-29

== See also ==
- Civil Aviation Administration of Moldova
- List of airports in Moldova
- Moldovan ICAO Airport Codes
