= Ros, Belarus =

Urban-type settlement in Grodno Region, Belarus

Ros Рось (Belarusian) Россь (Russian)
- Urban-type settlement
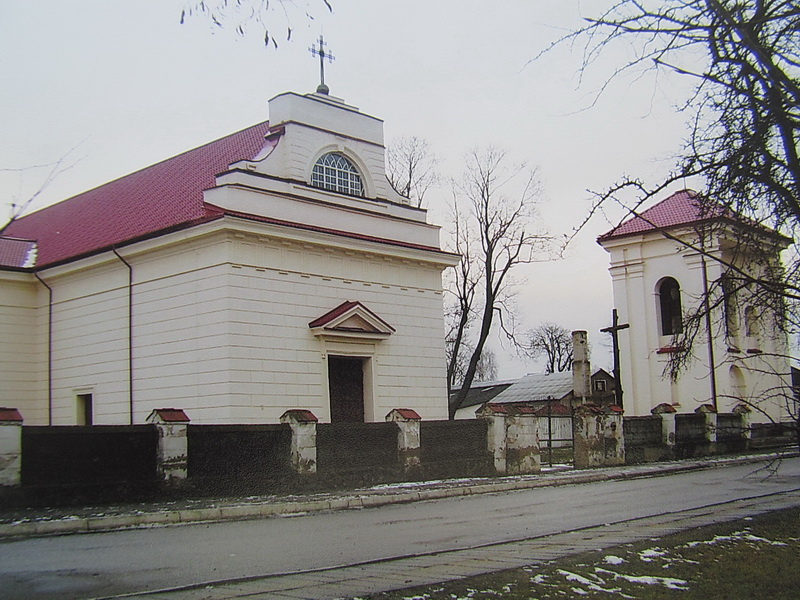
- Holy Trinity church

- Location within Belarus
- Coordinates: 53°17′N 24°24′E
- Country: Belarus
- Region: Grodno Region
- District: Vawkavysk District

Population (2025)
  - Total: 4,319
- Time zone: UTC+3 (MSK)

Ros (Belarusian: Рось; Russian: Россь, romanized: Ross; Polish: Roś; Yiddish: ראָש) is an urban-type settlement in Vawkavysk District, Grodno Region, in western Belarus. It is situated on the Ros River, a left tributary of the Neman. As of 2025, it has a population of 4,319.

== History ==
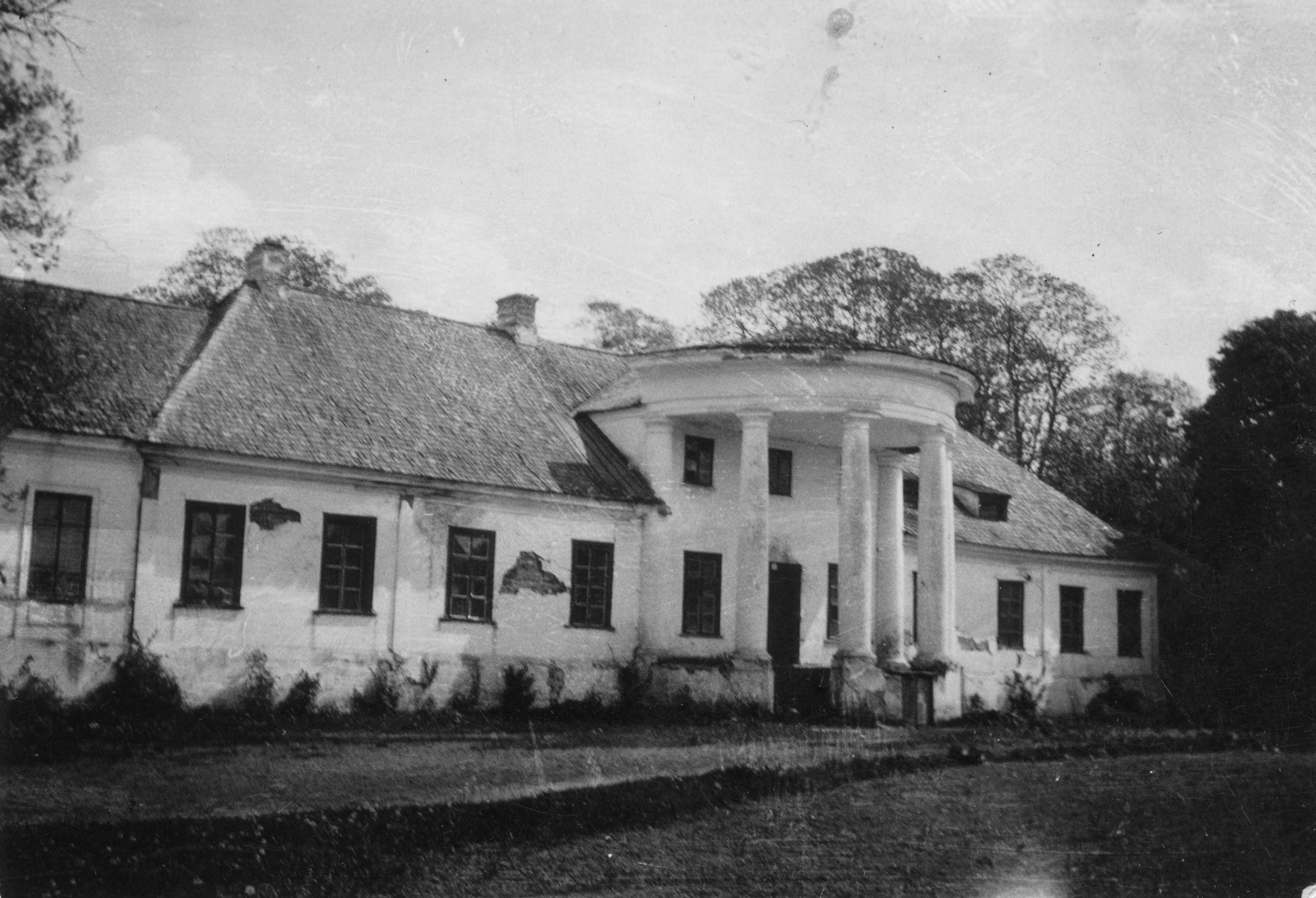
Branicki Manor in the interbellum

Roś was a private town, administratively located in the Wołkowysk County in the Nowogródek Voivodeship of the Polish–Lithuanian Commonwealth. In 1611, hetman Hieronim Chodkiewicz erected the Holy Trinity church.

In the interwar period, Roś, as it was known in Polish, was administratively located in the Wołkowysk County in the Białystok Voivodeship of Poland. According to the 1921 census, 83.1% people declared Polish nationality, 15.6% declared Jewish nationality and 1.3% declared Belarusian nationality.

During World War II, the town was first occupied by the Soviet Union until 1941, then by Nazi Germany until 1944, and re-occupied by the Soviet Union afterwards.

== Demographics ==
Historical population
Year	Pop.	±%
1878	794	—
1921	822	+3.5%
1970	3,549	+331.8%
1979	3,747	+5.6%
1989	4,326	+15.5%
2023	4,416	+2.1%
2024	4,407	−0.2%
2025	4,319	−2.0%
