= 24th Air Army =

The 24th Air Army was an Air army of the Soviet Air Forces, active from 1980, and probably inactivated in 1992. Its headquarters was located at Vinnitsa.

== First formation (1949–1968) ==
From 1949 to 1968, the 16th Air Army in the Group of Soviet Forces in Germany was designated the 24th Air Army.

== 2nd Separate Heavy Bomber Aviation Corps 1960–1980 ==
2nd Separate Heavy Bomber Aviation Corps was established in August 1960 at Vinnitsa from elements of HQ 43rd Air Army of the Long Range Aviation.

Units in 1961:

- 199th Separate Guards Long-Range Reconnaissance Aviation Regiment (Nezhin, Chernigov Oblast) with Tu-16R
- 13th Guards Heavy Bomber Aviation Division (Poltava, Poltava Oblast)
- 15th Guards Heavy Bomber Aviation Division (Ozernoye, Zhitomir Oblast)
- 106th Heavy Bomber Aviation Division (Uzin, Kiev Oblast)

Units in 1978:

- 199th Separate Guards Long-Range Reconnaissance Aviation Regiment (Nezhin, Chernigov Oblast) with Tu-22R
- 13th Guards Heavy Bomber Aviation Division (Poltava, Poltava Oblast)
- 15th Guards Heavy Bomber Aviation Division (Ozernoye, Zhitomir Oblast)
- 106th Heavy Bomber Aviation Division (Uzin, Kiev Oblast)

== 24th Air Army from 1980 ==
Redesignated 24th Air Army VGK ON (Russian: 24-я воздушная армия Верховного Главного командования оперативного назначения for 24th Air Army of the High Command with an Operational Purpose) on 1 August 1980. Soviet tactical aviation armies were subordinated to the military districts and the army groups abroad. Directly subordinated to the Air Force High Command were six air armies:

- Three air armies of the High Command with Strategic Purpose (воздушная армия Верховного Главного командования стратегического назначения (ВА ВГК СН)) - 30th, 37th and 46th for the strategic bomber force.
- One air army of the High Command for the Military Air Transport Aviation (воздушная армия Верховного Главного командования военно-транспортной авиации (ВА ВГК ВТА)) - 61st for the strategic airlift assets.
- Two air armies of the High Command with Operational Purpose (воздушная армия Верховного Главного командования оперативного назначения (ВА ВГК ОН)) - 4th (in the Polish People's Republic) and 24th (mostly in the Ukrainian SSR). In peacetime these two air armies were directly subordinated to the Air Force High Command. In case of war they were to transfer - the 4th under the High Command of Western Strategic Direction (Главное командование войск Западного направления (ГК ВЗН)) and the 24th under the High Command of the Southwestern Strategic Direction (Главное командование войск Юго-Западного направления (ГК ЮЗН)).

The 138th Fighter Aviation Division joined the 24th Air Army VGK in 1980.

At the dissolution of the Soviet Union this Army had forces in Belarus and Ukraine. In Ukraine forces consisted of the 32nd Bomber Aviation Division, at Starokonstantinov, the 56th Bomber Aviation Division at Cherlyany, and the 138th Fighter Aviation Division at Mirgorod. In Ukraine in 1991-92, this Army had available over 140 Su-24 Fencer, over 35 Yak-28 electronic warfare aircraft, and 40 MiG-27 Floggers and 40 Su-27 Flankers for strike escort.

=== 1990 ===
- 101st Separate Signals and Automated Command and Control Systems Regiment (Vinnitsa, Vinnitsa Oblast)
- 456th Separate Guards Transport Aviation Regiment (Vinnitsa, Vinnitsa Oblast)
- 118th Separate Aviation Regiment for Electronic Warfare (Chortkov, Ternopol Oblast)
- 511th Separate Reconnaissance Aviation Regiment (Buyalyk, near Odessa, Odessa Oblast)
- 32nd Bomber Aviation Division (Starokonstantinov, Khmelnitskiy Oblast)
  - 7th Bomber Aviation Regiment (Starokonstantinov, Khmelnitskiy Oblast) with Su-24
  - 727th Guards Bomber Aviation Regiment (Kanatovo, Kirovograd Oblast) with Su-24
  - 953rd Bomber Aviation Regiment (Bobrovichi, Gomel Oblast) with Su-24
- 56th Bomber Aviation Division (Cherlyany, Lvov Oblast)
  - 230th Bomber Aviation Regiment (Cherlyany, Lvov Oblast) with Su-24
  - 314th Bomber Aviation Regiment (Cherlyany, Lvov Oblast) with Su-24 (Holm states that this regiment was disbanded in 1988)
  - 947th Bomber Aviation Regiment (Dubna, Rovno Oblast) with Su-24
- 138th Fighter Aviation Division (Mirgorod, Poltava Oblast)
  - 168th Fighter Aviation Regiment (Starokonstantinov, Khmelnitskiy Oblast) with MiG-23
  - 831st Fighter Aviation Regiment (Mirgorod, Poltava Oblast) with Su-27

With the dissolution of the Soviet Union the army appears to have been inactivated. The city of Vinnitsa later became the headquarters of the Ukrainian Air Force.
