= 16th Air Army =

16th Red Banner Air Army
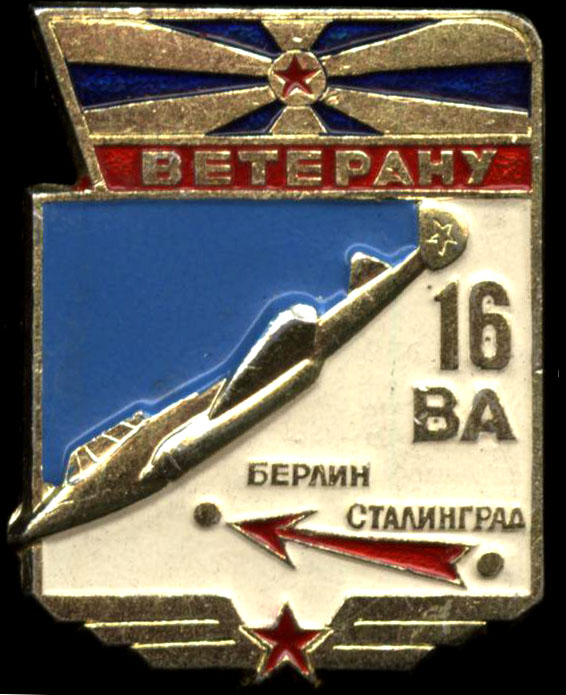
- Memorial badge 16th Air Army
- Active: 1942–2009
- Country: Soviet Union; Russia
- Branch: Soviet Air Force; Russian Air Force
- Part of: Group of Soviet Forces in Germany
- Engagements: World War II
- Decorations: Order of the Red Banner

Commanders
- Notable commanders: Sergey Rudenko

The 16th Red Banner Air Army (Russian: 16-я воздушная Краснознамённая армия) was the most important formation of the Special Purpose Command. Initially formed during the Second World War as a part of the Soviet Air Force, it was from its 2002 reformation to its 2009 disbandment the tactical air force component of the Moscow Military District. The 16th Air Army took part in the Battle of Berlin with 28 Aviation divisions and 7 Separate aviation regiments, and was located with the GSFG in East Germany until 1994. Withdrawn to Kubinka in that year, the army was disbanded and reformed as a corps in 1998. From 1949 to 1968, it was designated as the 24th Air Army.

== World War II ==
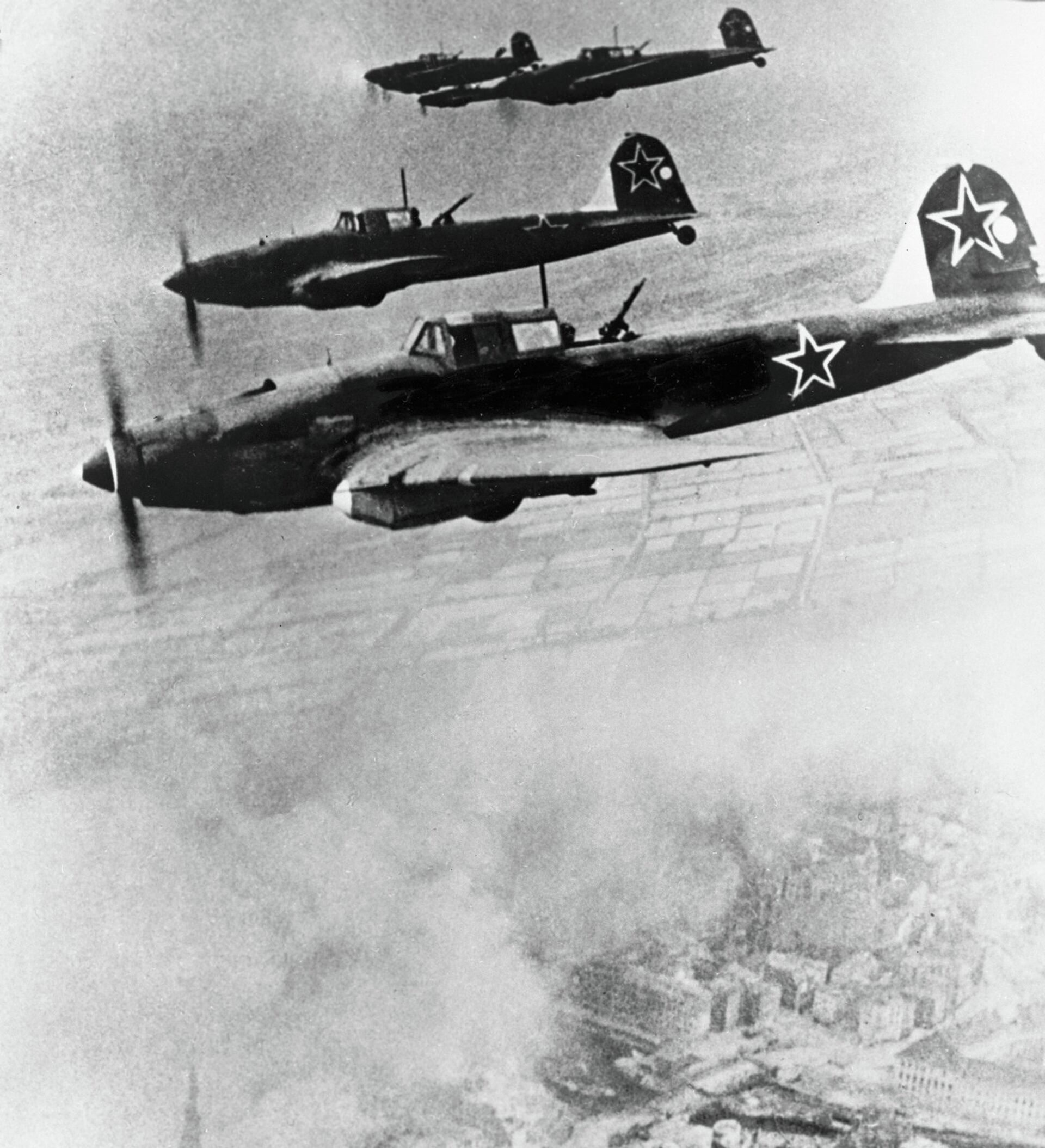
Ilyushin Il-2 attack aircraft of the 197th Assault Aviation Division's 567th Assault Aviation Regiment flying towards Berlin, 1 May 1945

The army began forming on 8 August 1942 during the Battle of Stalingrad and originally included the 220th Fighter Aviation Division (IAD) and 228th Assault Aviation Division (ShAD) of the 8th Air Army, as well as two separate aviation regiments. Around the end of August and the beginning of September, the 283rd IAD and 291st Mixed Aviation Division (SAD) arrived from the Reserve of the Supreme High Command. On 4 September, the army had 152 serviceable aircraft, composed of Yakovlev Yak-1 and Lavochkin-Gorbunov-Gudkov LaGG-3 fighters, Ilyushin Il-2 Shturmovik ground attack aircraft, and Petlyakov Pe-2 dive bombers.

It took part in Operation Uranus, the counteroffensive that successfully cut off German troops in Stalingrad, as part of the Don Front during November and December 1942, under the command of Major General Sergei Rudenko. On 19 November, when the offensive began, the army had a total of 249 serviceable aircraft.

It was involved in the Battle of Kursk, and was part of the First Belorussian Front for the liberation of Belarus, the Lublin-Brest Offensive, and the assault on Berlin.

== In Germany ==
On 29 May 1945, Stavka directive No. 11095 was issued (effective from 10.6.45), by which order the 1st Belorussian Front became the Group of Soviet Occupation Forces in Germany. The order also promulgated the new structure of 16th Air Army:

- 3rd Bomber Aviation Corps (Finow, East Germany)
  - 183rd Bomber Aviation Division (Oranienburg, East Germany)
  - 241st Bomber Aviation Division (Werneuchen, East Germany)
  - 301st Bomber Aviation Division (Finow, East Germany)
- 6th Bomber Aviation Corps (Szprotava, Poland)
  - 113th Bomber Aviation Division (Poznan-Kreising, Poland)
  - 326th Bomber Aviation Division (Sagan, Poland)
  - 334th Bomber Aviation Division (Poznan-Lawica, Poland)
- 6th Assault Aviation Corps (Finsterwalde, East Germany)
  - 197th Assault Aviation Division (Strausberg, East Germany)
  - 198th Assault Aviation Division (East Germany)
  - 2nd Guards Assault Aviation Division (Wittstock/Rechlin, East Germany)
- 9th Assault Aviation Corps (Finsterwalde, East Germany)
  - 3rd Guards Assault Aviation Division (Finsterwalde, East Germany)
  - 300th Assault Aviation Division (Cottbus, East Germany)
  - 11th Guards Assault Aviation Division (Jüterbog-Altes Lager, East Germany)
- 1st Guards Fighter Aviation Corps (Perleberg, East Germany)
  - 3rd Guards Fighter Aviation Division (Ludwigslust, East Germany)
  - 4th Guards Fighter Aviation Division (Perleberg, East Germany)
  - 240th Fighter Aviation Division (Tutow, East Germany)
- 3rd Fighter Aviation Corps (Lager Döberitz-Falkensee, East Germany)
  - 265th Fighter Aviation Division (Brandenburg, East Germany)
  - 278th Fighter Aviation Division (Elstal, East Germany)
  - 286th Fighter Aviation Division (Dallgow, East Germany)
- 13th Fighter Aviation Corps (Halle/Leipzig area, Germany)
  - 193rd Fighter Aviation Division (Altenburg, East Germany)
  - 283rd Fighter Aviation Division (Köthen or Halle, East Germany)
  - 282nd Fighter Aviation Division (Grossenhain, East Germany)
- 9th Guards Night-Bomber Aviation Division (Straussberg, East Germany)
- 16th independent Reconnaissance Aviation Regiment (Schönwalde, East Germany)
- 93rd independent Artillery Correction Regiment (Fürstenwalde, East Germany)
- 98th independent Artillery Correction Regiment (Zerbst, East Germany)
- 226th Separate mixed wing (Sperenberg Airfield, East Germany)
- 62nd Guards Aviation Regiment GVF (Berlin-Adlershof, East Germany)
- 919th independent Communications Aviation Squadron (East Germany)

For a long period after the war, the army was stationed with the Group of Soviet Forces in Germany, headquartered at Zossen-Wünsdorf. In 1949, it was renamed the 24th Air Army, but was reformed as the 16th in 1968.

== Withdrawal from Germany ==
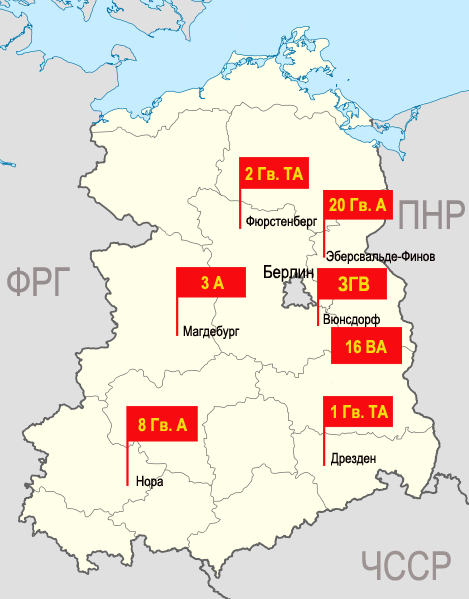
Armies of the Western Group of Forces, 1991

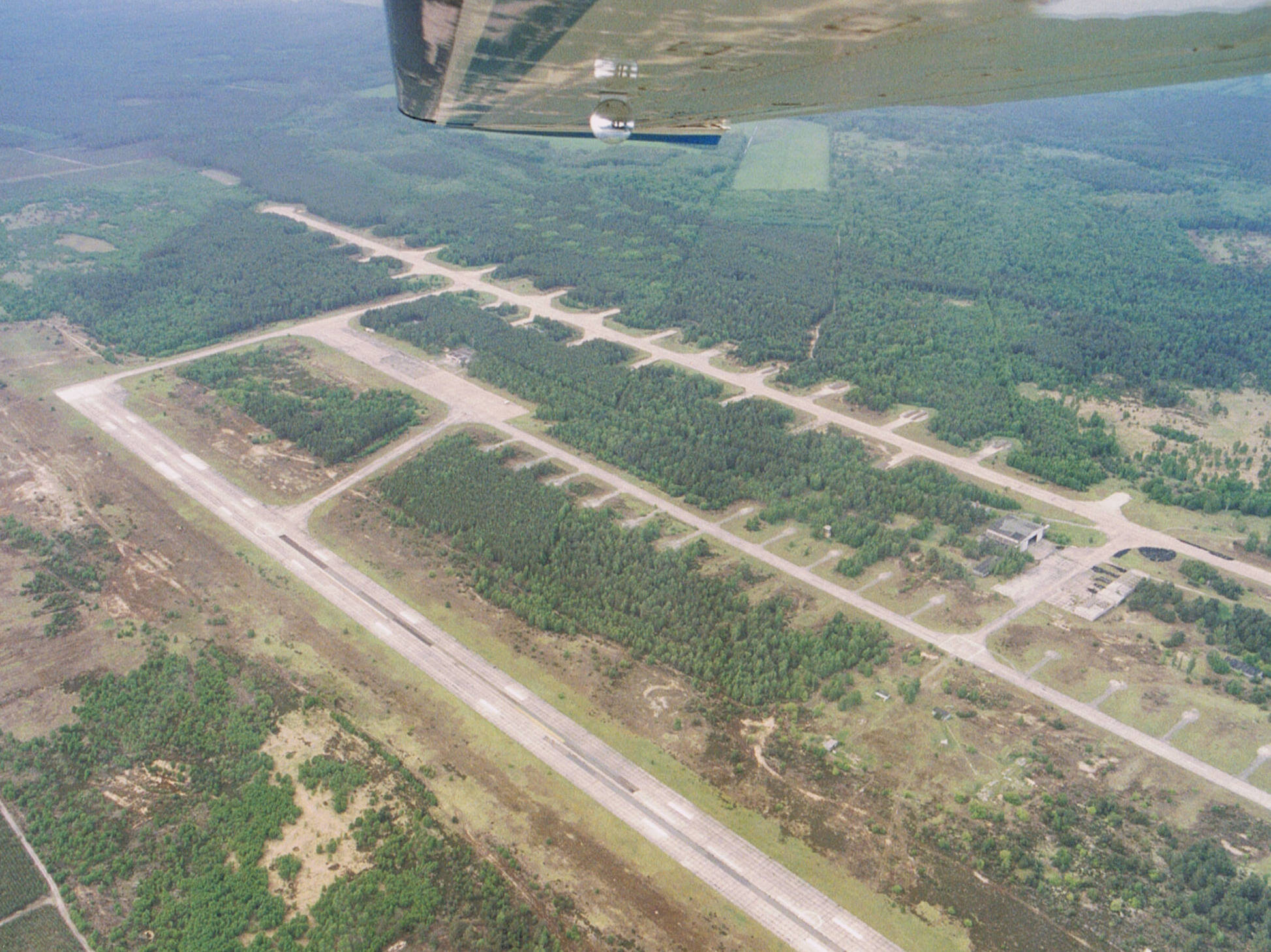
Sperenberg airfield, one of the main bases of the air army

The 16th Air Army ceremonially said farewell to Germany at the Sperenburg Open Day on 27 May 1994. On that day the Air Army Headquarters was moved to Kubinka in the Moscow Military District. However the last aircraft from the 226th Separate Mixed Aviation Regiment did not leave Sperenberg Airfield until 6 September 1994. A visiting Il-76MD was the last aircraft movement three days later.

In 1989 it consisted of subordinate units and formations as follows:

Headquarters, Zossen-Wünsdorf

- 6th Guards Fighter Aviation Division (Merseburg)
  - 296th Fighter-Bomber Aviation Regiment (Großenhain)
  - 31st Guards Fighter Aviation Regiment (Falkenberg/Elster)
  - 85th Guards Fighter Aviation Regiment (Merseburg)
  - 968th Fighter Aviation Regiment (Kobiz)
  - 139th Aviation Technical Regiment (Merseburg)
- 16th Guards Fighter Aviation Division (Damgarten)
  - 33rd Fighter Aviation Regiment (Wittstock)
  - 773rd Fighter Aviation Regiment (Damgarten)
  - 787th Fighter Aviation Regiment (Finow)
- 126th Fighter Aviation Division (Zerbst)
  - 35th Fighter Aviation Regiment (Zerbst)
  - 833rd Fighter Aviation Regiment (Altes Lager (Menzlin))
- 125th Fighter-Bomber Aviation Division (Rechlin)
  - 19th Guards Fighter-Bomber Aviation Regiment (Lerz)
  - 20th Fighter-Bomber Aviation Regiment (Groß Dölln)
- 105th Fighter-Bomber Aviation Division (Großenhain)
  - 296th Fighter-Bomber Aviation Regiment (Großenhain)
  - 559th Fighter-Bomber Aviation Regiment (Finsterwalde)
  - 911th Fighter-Bomber Aviation Regiment (Brand)
- Separate units, directly subordinated to the 16th Air Army
  - 11th Independent Reconnaissance Aviation Regiment (Welzow, later withdrawn to North Caucasus and joined 4th Air Army)
  - 226th Separate Mixed Aviation Regiment (Sperenberg, later relocated to Kubinka, see below)
  - 357th Separate Assault Aviation Regiment (Brandis, Germany)
  - 368th Separate Assault Aviation Regiment (Tutow, later withdrawn to North Caucasus and joined 4th Air Army)

See also

=== Airfields on German territory ===
The list below contains the main airfields of the 16th Air Army. The appropriate airfield call sign with the correlating nickname of the communications center is put in "quotation marks":

site	call sign	coms center (nickname)	coordinates
Ahlstedt	«vodoyom (Russian: водоём)»	«tonus (тонус)»	tbd
Altenburg airfield	«proran (проран)»	«stolbik (столбик)»	50°58′55″N 12°30′23″E
Altes Lager airfield	«lektsya (лекция)»	«kniga (книга)»	51°59′46″N 12°59′2″E
Brand airfield	«zveroboy (зверобой)»	«prosyolok (просёлок)»	52°2′20″N 13°44′56″E
Brandis airfield	«zapayka (запайка)»	«optika (oптика)»	51°19′42″N 12°39′25″E
Damgarten airfield	«sobol (cоболь)»	«urozhay (урожай)»	54°15′56″N 12°25′58″E
Dresden	«aryol (aрёол)»	«mebel, lira (мебель, лира)»	tbd
Falkenberg airfield	«baikal (байкал)»	«samokatsik (самокатчик)»	51°32′52″N 13°13′41″E
Finow airfield	«narzan (нарзан)»	«napayka, meshalka (напайка мешалка)»	52°49′38″N 13°41′37″E
Finsterwalde airfield	«gorodok (городок)»	«probar (проба)»	51°36′27″N 13°44′17″E
Grossenhain airfield	«ararat (aрарат)»	«tsekan bagatzrskiy (чекан, богатырский)»	51°18′42″N 13°33′33″E
Köthen airfield	«zemelnyi (земельный)»	«zenitnyi (зенитный)»	51°43′16″N 11°57′42″E
Mahlwinkel	«osenniy (осенний)»	«mukha, uksus (муха, уксус)»	52°23′24″N 11°46′59″E
Magdeburg (Cochstedt)	«садовый»	«аэроплан»	51°51′21″N 11°25′5″E
Merseburg airfield	«muskat (мускат)»	«tsaevod, radost (чаевод, радость)»	51°21′43″N 11°57′2″E
Neuruppin	«khuydor (хуторок)»	«powodok, plavshchik (поводок, плавщик)»	52°47′36″N 12°45′37″E
Nohra	«voevoda (воевода)»	«nagrad (нагар)»	50°57′55″N 11°14′2″E
Oranienburg airfield	«zadar (задар)»	«rtunyi (ртутный)»	52°44′4″N 13°12′58″E
Parchim airfield	«pushistyi (пушистый)»	«klits (клич)»	53°25′37″N 11°47′0″E
Rechlin–Lärz Airfield	«gusar (гусар)»	«metallist (металлист)»	53°18′23″N 12°45′11″E
Stendal-Borstel airfield	«kukan (кукан)»	«kumysny (кумысный)»	52°37′58″N 11°49′54″E
Sperenberg airfield	«souvenir (сувенир)»	«izvoztsik (извозчик)»	52°08′13.21″N 13°18′25″E
Templin airfield (Groß Dölln)	«leopard (леопард)»	«nozh, povelitel (нож, повелитель)»	53°1′44″N 13°30′59″E
Tutow airfield (Demmin)	«baas (баас)»	«serdolik (сердолик)»	53°55′19″N 13°13′8″E
Welzow airfield	«baas (баас)»	«serdolik (сердолик)»	51°34′22″N 14°8′22″E
Werneuchen airfield	«galerny (лагерный)»	«postament (постамент)»	52°37′59″N 13°1′22″E
Wittstock aifield	«gazovy (газовый)»	«postament (подкос, водонос)»	53°12′8″N 12°31′20″E
Zerbst	«karetny (каретный)»	«kinzhal, tsaynik (кинжал, чайник)»	52°0′3″N 12°8′55″E

== In the Russian Federation ==
On 1 June 1998, the 16th Air Army was disbanded and its units incorporated into the Moscow District of VVS and PVO, in accordance with the amalgamation of the Air Forces and the Russian Air Defence Forces (former Soviet Air Defence Forces). This was quickly reversed and on 25 November 1998, the 16th Mixed Aviation Corps was formed from the former units of the army. The corps was reformed as the 16th Air Army on 1 February 2002.

Savasleyka is another airbase within the Moscow Military District's boundaries, but its exact operational status is currently unclear, as the formerly resident unit, the 54th Guards Fighter Aviation Regiment, was not listed as operational in the most widely available recent survey of Russian air power, which was done by Air Forces Monthly in August and September 2007. The 54th Regiment had previously been withdrawn from Vainode Air Base in Latvia. Russian internet sources now say it has been reorganised as the 3958th Air Base.

The 16th Air Army was planned in 2007 to receive two regiments of the advanced Sukhoi Su-34 Fullback fighter-bombers.

As part of the extensive reorganization of the Russian Air Force in 2009, the army was withdrawn from the Special Purpose Command on 1 July, and its disbandment was completed by 1 December. Most of its units were transferred to the 1st Air and Air Defence Forces Command.

=== 2007 structure ===
16th Air Army – Kubinka

- 237th Guards Air Technology Demonstration Centre – Kubinka (MiG-29, Su-27, Su-27M, L-39C)
- 226th Separate Mixed Aviation Regiment – Kubinka
- 83rd Separate Communications Regiment – Kubinka
- 105th Mixed Aviation Division, Voronezh
  - 455th Bomber Aviation Regiment – Voronezh Malshevo/Baltimor, Voronezh (Su-24, being replaced by Su-34)
  - 899th Assault Aviation Regiment – Buturlinovka (Sukhoi Su-25 ground attack aircraft, being also replaced with Su-34)
- 47th Reconnaissance Aviation Regiment – Shatalovo (MiG-25 and Su-24MR in service)
- 14th Guards Leningrad Twice Red Banner Order of Suvorov Fighter Aviation Regiment – Kursk Vostochny Airport (MiG-29) Arrived Zherdevka (air base) in 1991, moved to Khalino-Kursk in 1998 or 1999.
- 28th Guards Fighter Aviation Regiment – Andreapol (air base) (MiG-29)
- 45th Separate Helicopter Regiment – Kaluga (attack helicopter, Mi-9 (airborne command post and relay))
- 440th Separate Helicopter Regiment – Vyazma (attack helicopter, Mil Mi-9)
- 490th Separate Helicopter Regiment – Tula (attack helicopter, Mil Mi-9)

== Commanding generals ==
Commanding generals of the 16th Air Army were as follows:

1. Pavel Stepanov, Lieutenant general of the aviation (1942)
2. Sergey Rudenko, Colonel general of the aviation (1942-1947)
3. Filipp Agaltsov, Lieutenant general of the aviation (1947-1949)
4. Vyatseslv Zabaluev, Major general of the aviation (1949-1950)
5. Konstantin Vershinin, Lieutenant general of the aviation (1950-1951)
6. Ivan Podgorny, Lieutenant general of the aviation (1951-1954)
7. Evgeny Loginov, Lieutenant general of the aviation (1954-1956)
8. Geory Zimin, Lieutenant general of the aviation (1956-1960)
9. Ivan Pstygo, Lieutenant general of the aviation (1960-1967)
10. Aleksey Katrits, Lieutenant general of the aviation (1967-1973)
11. Aleksandr Babaev, Lieutenant general of the aviation (1973-1978)
12. Vladimir Korotskin, Lieutenant general of the aviation (1978-1983)
13. Aleksey Goryaniov, Lieutenant general of the aviation (1983-1987)
14. Yevgeny Shaposhnikov, Lieutenant general of the aviation (1987-1988)
15. Anatoly Trasenko, Lieutenant general of the aviation (1988-1993)
16. Boris Kazatsky, Lieutenant general of the aviation (1993-1998)
17. Valery Retunsky, Lieutenant general of the aviation (1998-2007)
18. Aleksandr Belevits, Major general of the aviation (2007-2009)
