= 3rd Air Army =

- Active: 1942–1949
- Country: Soviet Union
- Engagements: World War II; First Rzhev–Sychyovka Offensive; Battle for Velikiye Luki; Smolensk Operation; Nevel Offensive; Gorodok Offensive; Vitebsk Offensive; Belarusian Operation; Baltic Offensive; East Prussian Offensive

Commanders
- Notable commanders: Mikhail Gromov (May 1942 – May 1943); Nikolai Filippovich Papivin (May 1943 – May 1945)

3rd Air Army (3 VA) was an Air Army of the Soviet Armed Forces during the Second World War. It was formed May 16, 1942, in accordance with a People's Commissariat for Defence order of 5 May 1942 on the basis of the Air Forces of the Kalinin Front.

== Combat path ==
The formation's combat path began in July 1942 during a defensive operation in the town of Bely, Tver Oblast, then participated in Rzhev-Sychevskaya and in the Luki operation. In February 1943 a number of its formations supported the troops of the North-Western Front in the liquidation of the Demyansk pocket. Later, as part of the Kalinin Front (October 20, 1943, renamed to 1st Baltic Front), the 3rd Air Army participated in the Front's Smolensk, Nevel, Gorodok, Vitebsk, Belarusian and Baltic Offensives.
In February 1945, near Koenigsberg, it came under the operational command of the 1st Air Army of the 3rd Belorussian Front and participated in the East Prussian Offensive. On 5 May 1945, it was transferred to the operational command of the Leningrad Front and with 15th Air Army took part in the blockade of German forces in the Courland Peninsula.

During the war 3VA flew over 200,000 sorties. It destroyed 4,000 enemy aircraft on the ground and in the air. Thousands of its soldiers were awarded orders and medals, many of the pilots and navigators the title Hero of the Soviet Union and Ivan Pavlov and Aleksey Smirnov won the title twice.

== Composition ==
The Combat Composition of the Soviet Army for 1 June 1942 shows the 3rd Air Army with the 209th, 210th Fighter Aviation Divisions, the 211th and 212th Mixed Aviation Divisions, the 684th and 695th Lighter Bomber Aviation Regiments, the 195th, 708th, 881st, 882nd, 883rd, 884th, 885th, and 887th Mixed Aviation Regiments, and the 3rd Reconnaissance Aviation Squadron. By 1 April 1943, 3rd Air Army was reported by Soviet official sources to comprise 1st Guards Fighter Aviation Corps (3rd and 4th Guards Fighter Aviation Divisions, including 63rd Guards Fighter Aviation Regiment), 1st Assault Aviation Corps (266th, 292nd Assault Aviation Divisions), 2nd Assault Aviation Corps (231st, 232nd Assault Aviation Divisions), 2nd Fighter Aviation Corps (209th, 215th Fighter Aviation Divisions), 211th Night Bomber Aviation Division, 80th Guards, 780th Bomber Aviation Regiments, 6th Guards, 230th, and 280th Assault Aviation Regiments, the 11th Independent Reconnaissance Aviation Regiment, 887th Assault Aviation Regiment, and the 13th and 36th Corps Aviation Squadrons.

== Commanders ==
- 05/05/1942 - Major General, Lieutenant General of Aviation Mikhail Gromov
- 26/05/1943 - Major General of Aviation, Lieutenant General of Aviation, Colonel General of Aviation Nikolai Filippovich Papivin

== Disestablishment ==
On May 5, 1945, the army transferred to the operational control of the Leningrad Front. On July 24, 1945, it came under Leningrad Military District. In early 1946, units and formations of the army transferred to the 15th Air Army, and on the basis of the remaining formed 1st Air Army long-range aviation.
