= 11th Guards Fighter Aviation Division =

11th Guards Fighter Aviation Dnepropetrovsk Red Banner Order of Bogdan Khmelnitsky Division
- 11-я гвардейская истребительная авиационная дивизия
- Active: August 24, 1943–June 1991
- Branch: Red Army Air Force; Soviet Air Forces
- Nickname: "Dnepropetrovsk"
- Engagements: World War II; Donbas operation; Zaporozhye operation; Dnepropetrovsk operation; Lvov–Sandomierz offensive; Vistula-Oder offensive; Lower Silesian offensive; Berlin offensive; Prague offensive; Hungarian Uprising; Operation Danube
- Decorations: Order of the Red Banner; Order of Bohdan Khmelnytsky, 2nd class

The 11th Guards Fighter Aviation Division (Russian: 11-я гвардейская истребительная авиационная Днепропетровская Краснознамённая ордена Богдана Хмельницкого дивизияw) as an aviation division of the Soviet Air Forces, active from 1943 to 1991. It served in the Southern Group of Forces in Hungary for many years.

The 11th Guards Fighter Aviation Division was originally formed from the 207th Fighter Aviation Division.

During the Second World War, it was part of the "operational army" from: August 24, 1943 to January 6, 1944, 135 days in total; and from May 18, 1944 to May 11, 1945, 358 days in total, totalling together 493 days. It fought in the:

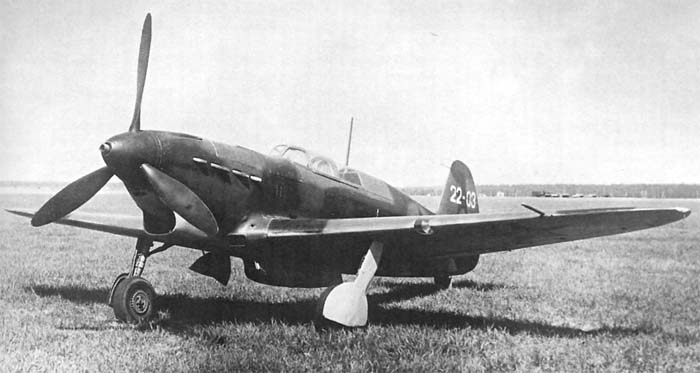
A Yak-7 fighter aircraft.

- Lower Dnieper strategic offensive operation
  - Zaporozhye operation from October 10, 1943 to October 14, 1944.
  - Dnepropetrovsk offensive from October 23, 1943 to November 5, 1943.
- Dnieper-Carpathian offensive:
  - Nikopol–Krivoi Rog offensive from January 30, 1944 to February 29, 1944.
  - Bereznegovatoye–Snigirevka offensive from March 6, 1944 to March 18, 1944.
- Odessa offensive from March 23, 1944 to April 14, 1944.
- Lvov–Sandomierz offensive – from July 13, 1944 to August 3, 1944
- Vistula-Oder offensive – from January 12, 1945 to February 3, 1945
- Lower Silesian offensive – from February 8, 1945 to February 24, 1945
- Berlin offensive – from April 16, 1945 to May 8, 1945
- Prague offensive – from May 6, 1945 to May 11, 1945

From August 1943 to May 1944 the division was assigned to the 1st Guards Mixed Aviation Corps of the 17th Air Army. Later the division was part of the 2nd Guards Assault Aviation Corps and the 2nd and 8th Air Armies.

The 11th Guards Fighter Aviation Division (11 GvIAD) moved from Parndorf in Austria to Veszprém in Hungary in November 1945. Though it moved to Hungary, it remained under the command of 2nd Guards Assault Aviation Corps.

The division was stationed at Veszprem until September 1949. It came under the command of the 78th Guards Fighter Aviation Corps in January 1949. On 20 February 1949, it was renamed 195th Guards Dnepropetrovsk Red Banner Order of Bogdan Khmelnitsky Fighter Aviation Division. In 1950 the division comprised the 1st, 5th, and 106th Guards Fighter Aviation Regiments at Tokol and Pápa flying Mikoyan-Gurevich MiG-15s. In 1956 it was involved in the Hungarian Revolution of 1956, and in 1968 in the Soviet invasion of Czechoslovakia. The 106th Guards Fighter Aviation Regiment was disbanded in mid-1961 and was replaced by the 14th 'Leningradskiy' Guards Fighter Aviation Regiment. The 1st Guards Fighter-Bomber Aviation Regiment became separate of the division, reporting directly to 36th Air Army, in mid-1963, and from July 1960 to 22 April 1991 with two short breaks was stationed at Kunmadaras.

The 195th Guards Fighter Aviation Dnepropetrovsk Red Banner Order of Bogdan Khmelnitsky Division was renamed by the Directive of the General Staff in April 1968 into the 11th Guards Fighter Aviation Dnepropetrovsk Red Banner Order of Bogdan Khmelnitsky Division.

Structure 1970:

- 5th Guards Fighter Aviation Regiment (ru:5-й гвардейский истребительный авиационный полк, formed 6 December 1941) (Sármellék, Hungary) with Mikoyan-Gurevich MiG-21. Full honor titles 5-й гвардейский истребительный авиационный Берлинский Краснознамённый ордена Богдана Хмельницкого полк.
- 14th Guards Fighter Aviation Regiment (Kiskunlacháza, Hungary) with MiG-21
- 515th Fighter Aviation Regiment (Tököl, Hungary) with MiG-21

The 14th GvIAP was based in 1981 at Kiskunlachaza air base in Hungary. The 14th acquired MiG-23Ms in 1975 and in 1979 also received MLs. The MiG-23s were replaced by MiG-29s in 1986. Elements of the regiment took part in the Warsaw Pact Exercise Zapad-81 in East Germany in late 1981.

The 515th Fighter Aviation Regiment was disbanded at Tokol in August 1989. The 5th Guards Fighter Aviation Regiment was disbanded in October 1990, with aircraft and crews being withdrawn to Biaroza, Brest Oblast, in the Byelorussian SSR.

Two regiments of the 36th Air Army were returned to the Soviet Union in April 1991. On 21 April the 14th Guards Fighter Aviation Regiment moved back to Zherdevka, Tambov Oblast, in the Moscow Military District. The next day (22 April 1991) the 1st Guards Fighter-Bomber Aviation Regiment was transferred back to the Soviet Union, being moved back to Lebyazhye in Volgograd Oblast.

The 11th Guards Fighter Aviation Division was disbanded in June 1991.
