= Oleg Tolstikov =

Soviet Air Force colonel general

Oleg Viktorovich Tolstikov
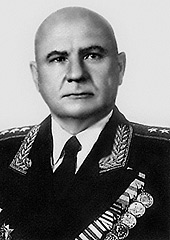
- Born: 27 December 1905; Belyov, Tula Governorate, Russian Empire
- Died: 23 September 1971 (aged 65) Moscow, Soviet Union
- Allegiance: Soviet Union
- Branch: Soviet Air Force
- Service years: 1921–1970
- Rank: Colonel general
- Commands: 47th Mixed Aviation Division; 233rd Assault Aviation Division; 9th Mixed Aviation Corps (became 10th Assault Aviation Corps)
- Conflicts: World War II
- Awards: Order of Lenin (2)

Oleg Viktorovich Tolstikov (Russian: Олег Викторович Толстиков; 27 December 1905 – 23 September 1971) was a Soviet Air Force colonel general who held corps command during World War II and senior positions postwar.

Beginning his career in air units as a clerk, Tolstikov completed pilot training in the 1930s and became a commander in aviation units. After commanding two aviation divisions in the first years of the war, he rose to command the 9th Mixed Aviation Corps which he led for the rest of the war. Postwar, Tolstikov commanded air defense units, and served as a deputy minister of internal affairs and as chief of staff of the Civil Defense Forces before his retirement.

== Early life and prewar service ==
A Russian, Oleg Viktorovich Tolstikov was born on 27 December 1905 in the city of Belyov, Tula Governorate. Conscripted into the Red Army in June 1921, he was enlisted in the 460th Separate Battalion of the Cheka Troops at Belyov. The same year the battalion was reorgnanized into the 574th Rifle Regiment of the VOKhR troops, then the VVNUS (Internal Troops). After the relocation of the battalion Tolstikov was left in Belyov at the district military commissariat. In December 1923 he was appointed a copyist in the 250th Rifle Regiment of the 84th Rifle Division. In February 1924 he was transferred to the 1st Higher School of Red Military Pilots in Moscow, then renamed the 3rd Military Pilots' School. Here Tolstikov continued serving as a copyist, senior copyist and chief clerk. In December 1925 the school was disbanded, and Tolstikov was sent to the 3rd Separate Aviation Detachment of the Air Force of the Moscow Military District in Ivanovo-Voznesensk as an adjutant. In January 1928 he transferred to serve as an adjutant with the 28th Aviation Park of the Air Forces of the Moscow Military District (which stored and issued aviation equipment items) at the same location.

In September of that year Tolstikov, after a period as a trainee observer, was sent to observer training at the 3rd Voroshilov Military School of Pilots and Observers in Orenburg. After graduating from the school, he served as a junior and senior observer in the 57th Aviation Squadron of the 3rd Aviation Brigade of the Air Force of the Leningrad Military District. From December 1931 to April 1932 Tolstikov continued training at the courses for armament instructors at the 3rd Military School of Pilots and Observers. After returning to the unit he was appointed chief of the fuel and armament service of the 92nd Aviation Detachment of the 3rd Aviation Brigade. In July Tolstikov became a student at the 2nd Military School of Pilots in Borisoglebsk. After graduating from the school, he commanded a detachment of the 12th Separate Army Reconnaissance Squadron at Armavir from December 1933.

In January 1934, Tolstikov's squadron was relocated to the Soviet Far East, where it was assigned to the Air Force of the Primorsky Group of Forces of the Special Red Banner Far Eastern Army. In June 1938 he was appointed squadron commander in the 8th Assault Aviation Regiment of the 53rd Aviation Brigade of the VVS of the 1st Separate Red Banner Army, and from September commanded this regiment. From February 1939 Tolstikov served as assistant commander of the 53rd Aviation Brigade. In August 1940 then-Major Tolstikov was transferred west to become deputy commander of the 47th Mixed Aviation Division of the Air Force of the Oryol Military District.

== World War II ==
After Operation Barbarossa began on 22 June 1941, Tolstikov continued to serve in the position as the division became part of the Air Force of the Western Front. The division fought in the Battle of Smolensk, in the Yartsevo sector. In late August he became division commander. The division operated in the Velikiye Luki sector, participating in the Vyazma defensive operation in fall 1941. As division commander, he was assessed "as having organizational ability, calm in battle, hot-tempered in character, exacting to himself and subordinates" during a period when the "pilots of the division were under great stress, flying three to five combat sorties a day."

From 24 November Tolstikov was acting commander of the Air Force of the 59th Army, then from January 1942 commanded the 1st Aviation Brigade of the Reserve of the Supreme High Command. In May he was appointed commander of the 233rd Assault Aviation Division of the 1st Air Army of the Western Front. The division supported the offensive of the front in the Yukhnov, Gzhatsk, and Rzhev sectors. General Sergei Khudyakov assessed Tolstikov as

understanding correctly and rapidly in the conditions of modern battle, making decisions deliberately and clearly setting tasks for units. In the execution of the tasks set by higher commanders, decisive and consistent in the combat employment of his units. Ability to display reasonable initiative and make his own decisions in difficult conditions.

Tolstikov took command of the 9th Mixed Aviation Corps, forming in the Millerovo area, on 15 February 1943, and was promoted to major general on 17 March. He led the corps, as part of the 17th Air Army, in the Belgorod–Kharkov offensive operation, the Donbas strategic offensive, the Zaporozhye offensive, and the Odessa Offensive, in which it supported the advancing troops and provided constant air cover. Army commander Vladimir Sudets repeatedly praised the actions of the corps and Tolstikov. He noted that in August 1943 that the "corps' ground attack and bomber strikes against the ranks of the enemy contributed to the breakthrough of the 8th Guards Army in the area of Sukhaya Kamenka and Dolgenkaya," fulfilling all the set tasks in a "fine and excellent manner," "...especially successful work of ground attack and bomber actions of the corps for the disruption of enemy transportation from the Donbass to the Kharkov area..." For "successful leadership" of the corps in these operations Tolstikov was awarded the Order of Suvorov, 2nd class.

During September and October 1943, during the Battle of the Dnieper, the corps assisted the ground troops in the elimination of the German Zaporozhye bridgehead. Tolstikov was promoted to lieutenant general on 2 August 1944. In September 1944 the 9th Mixed Aviation Corps was reorganized as the 10th Assault Aviation Corps, which Tolstikov continued to command. The corps ended the war in the Balaton defensive operation and the Vienna offensive. Sudets noted that Tolstikov,

during the period of combat operations was personally at the command post of ground army and corps commanders. Thanks to his fine and correct leadership for air-ground cooperation, the troops successfully destroyed enemy personnel and equipment...Personally disciplined, decisive and consistent in the execution of his decisions. Energetic, dynamic and proper.

== Postwar ==
After the end of the war, Tolstikov continued to command the corps. In January 1946 he became deputy commander of the 2nd Air Army in the Central Group of Forces and in April, chief of the Combat Training Directorate of VVS ground attack aviation, and from July 1948 chief of the Red Banner State Scientific Testing Institute VVS. From January 1950 he studied at the aviation department of the Voroshilov Higher Military Academy, and after graduating in December 1951 was appointed chief of staff and first deputy commander of the Baku Air Defense Region. From 13 February to 21 June 1954 he commanded the air defense forces of the Baku Region, then returned to his previous position. In August 1955 he was transferred to the Ministry of Internal Affairs as deputy minister of internal affairs for local air defense. While in this position, he was promoted to colonel general of aviation on 18 February 1958. In April 1960 he returned to the army and in June was appointed chief of staff of the Civil Defense Forces. From 1965 he served as first deputy chief of the Civil Defense Forces. Tolstikov retired on 16 January 1970. He died in Moscow on 23 September 1971.

== Decorations ==
Tolstikov received the following:

- Order of Lenin (2)
- Order of the Red Banner (5)
- Order of Suvorov, 1st class
- Order of Bogdan Khmelnitsky, 1st class
- Order of Suvorov, 2nd class
- Order of Kutuzov, 2nd class
- Order of the Red Star
- Medals
