= Vasily Ryazanov =

General-lieutenant of aviation (1901–1951)

Vasily Georgievich Ryazanov
- Василий Георгиевич Рязанов
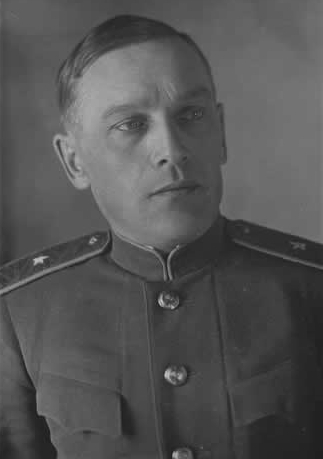
- Born: 25 January [O.S. 12 January] 1901; Kozino village, Nizhny Novgorod Governorate, Russian Empire
- Died: 8 July 1951 (aged 50); Kiev, Ukrainian SSR, USSR
- Military career
- Allegiance: Soviet Union
- Branch: Soviet Air Force
- Service years: 1920–1951
- Rank: General-lieutenant of Aviation
- Conflicts: World War II; Winter War; Eastern Front
- Awards: Hero of the Soviet Union (twice)

Vasily Georgievich Ryazanov (Russian: Василий Георгиевич Рязанов; 25 January [O.S. 12 January] 1901 – 8 July 1951) was a General-lieutenant of Aviation in the Soviet Air Forces who was twice awarded the title Hero of the Soviet Union for his leadership of the 1st Guards Assault Aviation Corps during World War II. Ryazanov was responsible for the development of tactics that consisted of the ground-attack aircraft being directed from a command post on the ground close to the frontline, and he was praised by Marshal Ivan Konev for having the best attack aircraft in the Air Force.

== Early life ==
Ryazanov was born on 25 January [O.S. 12 January] 1901 to a Russian peasant family in Bolshoye Kozino village, where he completed his fifth grade of school in 1913 before attending a school in Balakhna until 1916. He then returned to his hometown to work at a co-op before getting a job at a post office in Sormovo, but returned to Kozino in 1918 when he was hired as a primary school teacher. In December 1919 he was promoted to a higher position in the education department, and the next year he graduated from a provincial school. He became a member of the Communist Party in 1920.

== Military career before World War II ==
After entering the Red Army in May 1920, Ryazanov worked as a lecturer in the political department. In 1921 he left the position, and the next year he completed assigned courses at Moscow State University. In 1924 he graduated from the Sverdlov Communist University, after which he was made political instructor of the 17th Rifle Division. In March 1925 he was made party head in a training unit at the Borisoglebsk Military Aviation School of Pilots. There, he became a student and graduated from the flight courses. In 1926 he became the party head of the education department of the Leningrad Higher Military Aviation School of observer pilots, and the next year he graduated from the Serpukhov Higher School of Aerial Firing and Bombing before being made squadron commander of a training unit back at the school in Leningrad; in 1928 the school was relocated to Orenburg. Ryazanov stayed there until being sent back to Leningrad in 1929 for a post as flight commander at a military theoretical school of the Air Force. In February 1930 he was promoted to assistant head of the training department. In December that year he graduated from the advanced training courses for commanding officers at the Zhukovsky Academy.

In 1931 he was posted to the Odessa Military Aviation School of Pilots as a squadron commander, but transferred in December to the Moscow School of Special Services of the Air Force. In 1933 he was made commander of a light bomber squadron, and later that year he was promoted to commander of a brigade in Zhukovsky. Three months after graduating from the operational department of the Zhukovsky academy in April 1936 he was put in command of the 44th Attack Aviation Brigade, which was based in Krasnoyarsk. During the Great Purge he was arrested on 12 March 1938; he was then dismissed from the military on 19 April 1938, but reinstated in August 1939. While under arrest he was kept in Krasnoyarsk prison and subjected to prolonged interrogations, but eventually the charges were dropped. After his reinstatement he began working as a teacher at the Zhukhovsky Academy in the tactics department. During the Winter War he was the chief of intelligence of the 13th Air Army, after which he returned to teaching. In July he was made the head of the training department of the Monino Air Force Academy, where he remained until the German invasion of the Soviet Union.

== World War II ==
Starting in June 1941 Ryazanov became the head of the operational department of the 62nd Bomber Aviation Division due to the launch of Operation Barbarossa. He was only there briefly, since later that month he became the deputy commander of the 5th Air Army. In August he was transferred again, being made the head of the control group of the Air Force Directorate on the Southwestern Front. Then from December 1941 to March 1942 he commanded the 76th Mixed Aviation Division, after which he commanded an air group until June; in March 1942 he was promoted to the rank of major general and one year later he was promoted to the rank of lieutenant general. For about a month he was the commander of the 268th Fighter Aviation Division, which was his last command assignment on the Southwestern Front. There, he led his units in the battles for various parts of Ukraine including Kiev, Donbass, and Kharkov. In July he was briefly made commander of the 2nd Fighter Aviation Army, but before the end of the month it was split into two groups of aviation divisions, each assigned to a different air army.

Starting in September he commanded the 1st Assault Aviation Corps, where he remained for the rest of the war. In February 1944 it was awarded the "Guards" designation, but it was not given a new number, so it simply became the 1st Guards Assault Aviation Corps. During his tenure the unit was stationed on the Kalinin, Northwest, Voronezh, Steppe, 1st Ukrainian, and 2nd Ukrainian fronts, under the 2nd, 3rd, 5th, and 6th Air Armies. For his leadership of the corps in the battle of the Dnieper he was awarded his first gold star, and the second one was awarded after the war for leadership in the offensive on the Vistula. Other operations he participated in as corps commander included the Berlin, Kirovograd, Kursk, Belgorod, Lvov, Lviv-Sandomierz, and Silesian offensives.

== Later life ==
After the capitulation of Nazi Germany he remained in command of the 1st Guards Assault Aviation Corps until February 1947 when he was made commander of the 14th Air Army. From that year until 1951 he was a member of the Supreme Soviet of the Belarusian SSR. At the time of his death in Kislovodsk on 8 July 1951 he was the commander of the 69th Air Army, which he had been since 1949.

== Awards ==
- Twice Hero of the Soviet Union (22 February 1944 and 2 June 1945)
- Two Order of Lenin (22 February 1944 and 21 February 1945)
- Three Order of the Red Banner (22 February 1943, 3 November 1944, and 15 November 1950)
- Order of Suvorov 2nd class (27 August 1943)
- Order of Bogdan Khmelnitsky 1st class (18 August 1944)
- Order of the Red Star (29 December 1935)
- Order of the Cross of Grunwald 3rd class (1945)
- Virtuti Militari 3rd class (1945)
- Czechoslovak War Cross (1945)
