= List of Ukrainian flag officers losses during the Russo-Ukrainian war =

A number of Ukrainian flag officers have been killed, wounded or captured during the Russo-Ukrainian War, including the Russian takeover of Crimea, the War in Donbas and the ongoing war. As of December 2025, this list includes 9 officers, including three of those who were promoted to general rank posthumously and one foreign general.

== List ==
| Image | Name | Rank | Position | Date reported | Status | Notes |
2014 Russian annexation of Crimea
| | Mykhailo Koval | Colonel General | Human Recources manager, State Border Guard Service of Ukraine | 5 March 2014 | Captured, later released | Captured by Russian Airborne Forces servicemen in Crimea. Released one day after. |
| | Serhiy Hayduk | Counter admiral (Note: Promoted to vice admiral on 23 August 2014) | Commander, Ukrainian Navy | 19 March 2014 | Captured, later released | Captured by pro-Russian forces alongside 8 other officials. Released one day after. |
War in Donbass (2014–2022)
| | Serhii Kulchytskyi | Major General | Chief, Combat and Special Training Department of the National Guard of Ukraine | 29 May 2014 | Killed | Killed alongside 12 other servicemen when their Mil Mi-8 helicopter was shot down in Sloviansk. |
| | Mykhailo Kutsyn | Lieutenant General | Chief of the General Staff, Armed Forces of Ukraine | 2 July 2014 | Wounded | Shell-shocked in July 2014 in the Donbas war. Dismissed from his position by President Poroshenko. |
| | Ihor Momot | Colonel (Note: Posthumously promoted to major general on 12 July 2014) | Deputy Chief, Eastern Regional Office of State Border Guard Service of Ukraine; Chief, Border Guard Training Center | 11 July 2014 | Killed | Killed by a Grad salvo in the Zelenopillia rocket attack. |
| | Oleksandr Radievsky | Colonel (Note: Posthumously promoted to major general on 25 July 2014) | Commander, 21st Separate Public Order Protection Brigade | 23 July 2014 | Killed | Ambushed alongside a battalion commander and a soldier in Lysychansk. |
| | Isa Munayev | Brigadier General of Chechen National Army | Commander, Dzhokhar Dudayev Battalion | 1 February 2015 | Killed | Killed by tank shell shrapnel during the Battle of Debaltseve |
| | Maksym Shapoval | Colonel (Note: Posthumously promoted to major general on 30 June 2017) | Commander, 10th Special Purpose Detachment | 27 June 2017 | Killed | Killed by a car bombing in central Kyiv. |
Russo-Ukrainian War (2022–present)
| | Artem Kotenko | Brigadier General | Chief of Staff, Ukrainian Air Assault Forces | 4 November 2022 | Killed | According to Russian sources, Kotenko, alongside another officer, died of shrapnel wounds or wounds he sustained in a car crash. His death was confirmed by the Zhytomyr City Council on 4 November 2024. |

== See also ==
- Casualties of the Russo-Ukrainian War
- List of Russian generals killed during the Russo-Ukrainian war (2022–present)
- Order of battle for the Russian invasion of Ukraine
