= 3rd Guards Fighter Aviation Corps =

3rd Guards Iasi Red Banner Order of Suvorov Fighter Aviation Corps
- Active: 1942–1960
- Country: Soviet Union
- Branch: Soviet Air Force; Soviet Air Defense Forces
- Size: 208 serviceable aircraft (May 1945)
- Engagements: World War II
- Decorations: Guards; Order of the Red Banner; Order of Suvorov
- Honorifics: Iasi

Commanders
- Notable commanders: Ivan Podgorny

The 3rd Guards Iasi Order of Suvorov Fighter Aviation Corps (Russian: 3-й гвардейский истребительный авиационный Ясский Краснознамённый ордена Суворова корпус) was an aviation corps of the Soviet Air Force formed during World War II. The corps was formed in December 1942 as the 4th Fighter Aviation Corps and received Guards status in July 1944. Postwar, the corps was renumbered as the 72nd Guards Fighter Aviation Corps and transferred to the Soviet Air Defense Forces. It was reorganized as an air defense division in 1960.

== World War II ==
The corps headquarters was formed in December 1942 in Moscow Oblast as the 4th Fighter Aviation Corps (IAK). It initially included the 265th and 302nd Fighter Aviation Divisions (IAD) and smaller separate units. The 294th IAD joined the corps in accordance with a 13 December directive and the 265th IAD left it on 8 January 1943. The corps was commanded by Colonel Ivan Podgorny (promoted to major general in March 1943 and lieutenant general in September 1944) for the entire war. Until mid-March 1943 the corps remained in the Reserve of the Supreme High Command, then was transferred to the 2nd Air Army of the Voronezh Front. The corps provided air cover for the ground troops of the front and airfields, escorted aircraft of the 1st Bomber Aviation Corps and the 1st Assault Aviation Corps during raids on the German forces, and flew reconnaissance missions. From the beginning of the Battle of Kursk, the corps took an active part in the air battle in order to gain and maintain air supremacy.

The corps was transferred to the 5th Air Army of the Steppe Front (renamed 2nd Ukrainian Front on 20 October) on 27 July, and fought as part of the 5th Army for the rest of the war. During August and September it participated in the Belgorod–Kharkov offensive and the Battle of the Dnieper. In early 1944, it was involved in the Kirovograd offensive and the Korsun-Shevchenkovsky Offensive. During the Uman–Botoșani offensive, the corps provided air cover for the troops of the front during their breakthrough of the German defenses, the crossing of the Southern Bug, Dniester, and Prut and subsequent offensive operations. For its "demonstrated courage in the battles for the Fatherland with German invaders and the heroism of its personnel," the 4th IAK was redesignated as the 3rd Guards IAK on 2 July 1944. Accordingly, the 294th and 302nd IADs became the 13th and 14th Guards IADs, respectively. During August, the corps fought in the Second Jassy–Kishinev offensive and for distinguishing itself in the capture of Iași received the name of the city as an honorific on 15 September 1944. Due to experience gained during the Battle of the Dnieper, Podgorny attempted to implement fighter tactics employing radar-assisted interception and free hunting tactics as more effective than the standard tactic of permanent patrols, which unnecessarily added more wear to aircraft engines and wasted fuel. However, the permanent patrols had to be retained in order to boost frontline morale as ground troops felt "more confident" being able to see their own fighters on the battlefield.

The 3rd Guards IAK fought in the Debrecen Offensive and the Budapest offensive from October 1944 to February 1945, during which it covered the main forces of the 1st Cavalry Mechanized Group of the 2nd Ukrainian Front. The 6th Guards IAD transferred to the corps in October to become the corps' third division. During the German Balaton offensive, the corps and the fighter units of the 17th Air Army provided air cover for the 3rd Ukrainian Front from German air raids. The corps ended the war in the Vienna offensive in March and April and the Prague offensive in May. Just before the start of the Prague Offensive, on 1 May the corps had a strength of 208 serviceable aircraft and 264 pilots. For its "exemplary fulfillment of command tasks" during the breakthrough of German defenses and the capture of Komarno, Nové Zámky, Šurany, Komjatice, and Vráble, the corps was awarded the Order of Suvorov, 2nd class on 17 May 1945. It was further decorated with the Order of the Red Banner on 4 June 1945 for its role in the capture of Jaroměřice, Znojmo, Hollabrunn, and Stockerau.

During the war, units of the corps flew more than 41,000 combat missions and was credited with destroying more than 2,000 aircraft. Several thousand personnel were decorated and 46 received the title Hero of the Soviet Union.

== Cold War ==
The corps was relocated to Bulgaria and transferred to the 17th Air Army of the Southern Group of Forces on 5 June 1945. It was withdrawn to the 7th Air Army (second formation) of the Transcaucasian Military District on 29 October 1947 and based in Turkmenistan. The corps was renumbered as the 72nd Guards Fighter Aviation Corps in 1949 and transferred to the Soviet Air Defence Forces (PVO) the next year as part of the 42nd Fighter Air Defense Army. It included the 14th Guards, 238th and 38th IADs while headquartered at Krasnovodsk. The 14th Guards IAD was disbanded in 1958 and its remaining regiments transferred to the 238th IAD. The corps became the 16th Guards Air Defense Division of the Baku Air Defense District in January 1960 during the reorganization of the PVO, incorporating surface to air missile units as well as interceptors.
