= 2nd Air Army =

- Active: 1942–1955
- Country: Soviet Union
- Branch: Soviet Air Force
- Type: Air army
- Size: 2,004 aircraft (April 1945)
- Engagements: World War II; Battle of Stalingrad; Battle of Kursk; Battle of the Dnieper; Korsun-Shevchenkovsky Offensive; Lvov–Sandomierz Offensive; Berlin Offensive; Prague Offensive

Commanders
- Notable commanders: Stepan Krasovsky

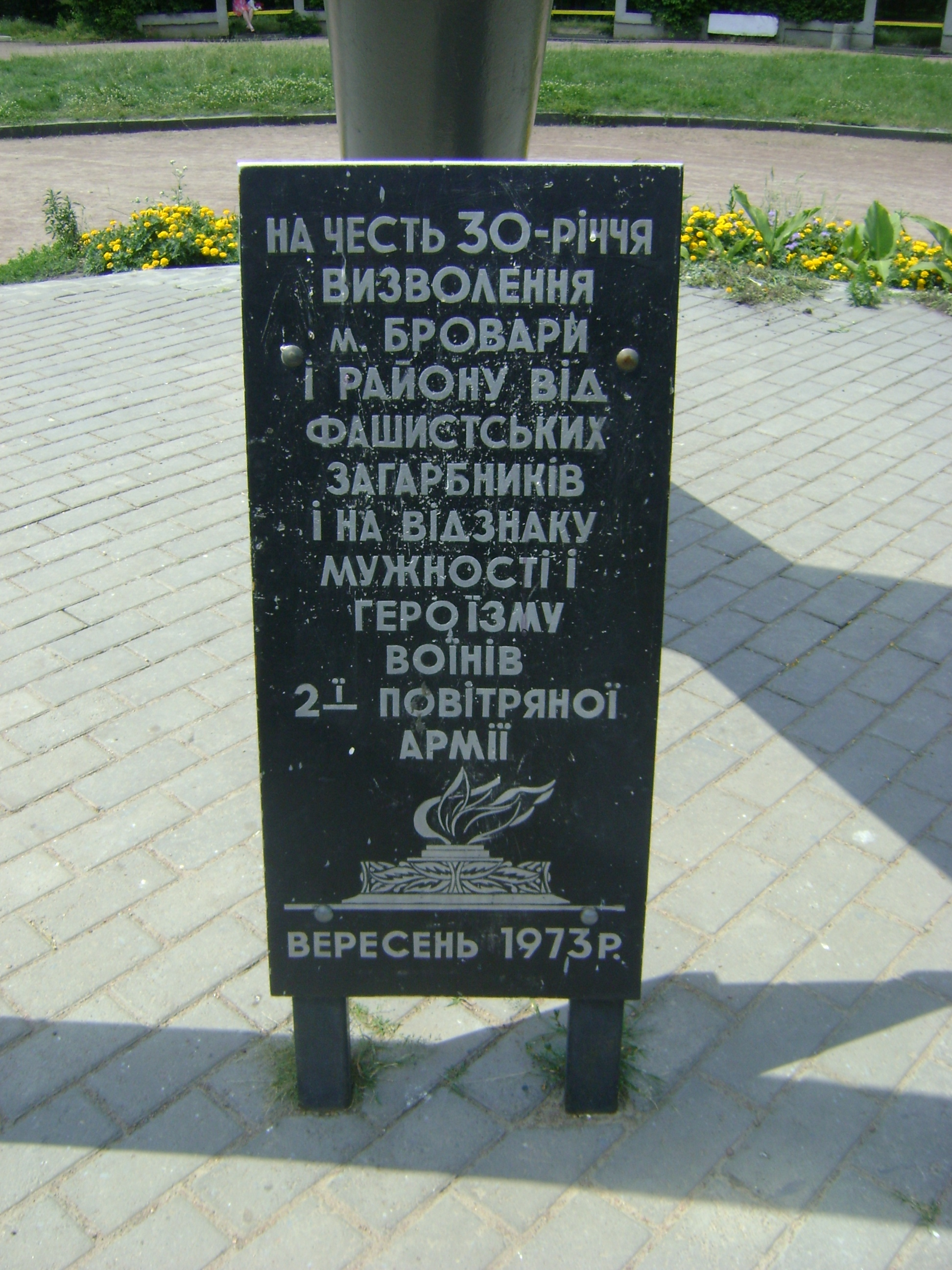
Memorial to the 2nd Air Army, Brovary, Ukraine

The 2nd Air Army (Russian: 2-я воздушная армия (2 ВА); 2 VA) was an air army of the Red Army Air Force (Soviet Air Force) during the Second World War.

Formed in May 1942, the army fought in the Battle of Stalingrad and was one of the major Soviet air formations in the Battle of Kursk and the Battle of the Dnieper. During the final two years of the war, the army provided air support for the Soviet troops of the 1st Ukrainian Front, including the Lvov–Sandomierz offensive, the Berlin Offensive, and the Prague offensive.

After the end of the war, the army was stationed in Austria and Hungary as part of the Soviet occupation forces. Renumbered in 1949 as the 59th Air Army, it was disbanded in 1955 when Soviet troops withdrew from Austria.

== World War II ==
The army was formed on 12 May 1942, in accordance with an order of the NKO of 5 May 1942, from the Air Force of the Bryansk Front. Originally supporting the Bryansk Front, the army was transferred to support the Voronezh Front on 9 July. It participated in defensive battles in the Voronezh sector, and then supported the troops of the Southwestern Front in the counter-offensive at Stalingrad (Battle of Stalingrad) between 16 November and 21 December, in collaboration with the 8th Air Army, the 16th Air Army and the 17th Air Army in the fight for supremacy in the air. During this period the 2nd Air Army was under the operational control of the Southwestern Front before returning to the Voronezh Front.

As part of the Voronezh Front (renamed the 1st Ukrainian Front on 20 October 1943) the army participated in the Battle of Kursk, the Battle of the Dnieper, Zhitomir–Berdichev Offensive, the Korsun–Shevchenkovsky Offensive, Rovno–Lutsk Offensive, Proskurov–Chernovtsy Offensive, Lvov-Sandomierz, Sandomir-Silesia, Lower Silesian Offensive, Upper Silesian Offensive, Battle of Berlin and the Prague Offensive. For the Berlin Offensive, the air army was among the largest in the Soviet Air Force with an inventory of 2,004 aircraft.

== Postwar ==
After the war 2nd Air Army was stationed in Austria and Hungary as part of the Soviet occupation forces, serving as the air force of the Southern Group of Forces. It was renumbered as 59th Air Army in 1949 as many Soviet Air Force units received new numbers. The 59th Air Army was disbanded in Austria, but its core was relocated to the town of Székesfehérvár to become the air force of the newly created Special Corps when the Soviet forces withdrew in September 1955.

Later the Soviet Air Defence Forces formed a 2nd Army of Air Defence Forces which operated in the Belorussian Soviet Socialist Republic, but this formation was disbanded around 1991–92.

== Commanders ==
The army was commanded by:

- 05/05/1942 – Major General of Aviation Stepan Krasovsky
- 05/07/1942 – Konstantin Smirnov, Colonel, (Major General Aviation from 17 October 1942);
- 03/27/1943 – May 1947 – Stepan Krasovsky, (Krasovsky was promoted to Lieutenant General Aviation with effect from 20 December 1942 and Colonel General Aviation from 4 February 1944);
- September 1947 - Colonel-General Stepan Ulyanovich Rubanov
- July 1950 - Colonel-General Vasily Nikolaevich Bibikov
- July 1953 - Colonel-General Georgy Vasilevich Zimin
- May 1954 - Colonel-General David Yakovlevich Slobozhan

== Composition ==
=== 12 May 1942 ===
- 205th, 206th, 207th Fighter Aviation Divisions
- 208th Night Bomber Aviation Division
- 223rd Short-Range Bomber Aviation Division
- 225th, 226th, 227th Assault Aviation Division
- Two independent aviation regiments.

=== 5 July 1943 ===
At the beginning of the Soviet defensive phase of the Battle of Kursk, the army included the following units:

- 1st Bomber Aviation Corps (1st BAK) (Colonel Ivan Polbin) (from 1944 – 6th Guards Bomber Aviation Corps), equipped with Petlyakov Pe-2
  - 1st Guards Bomber Aviation Division (Colonel Fyodor Dobysh)
  - 293rd Bomber Aviation Division (Colonel G.V. Gribakin)
- 1st Assault Aviation Corps (1st ShAK) (Major General of Aviation Vasily Ryazanov) (from 1944– 1st Guards Assault Aviation Corps) in the battles for the liberation of Ukraine, all three divisions of the corps, received the honorary title – Krasnograds'ka, Poltava, Znamenskaya. The corps received the honorific Kirovograd.
  - 266th Assault Aviation Division (Colonel F.G. Rodyakin), Il-2
  - 292nd Assault Aviation Division (Colonel Filipp Agaltsov), Il-2
  - 203rd Fighter Aviation Division (Colonel K.G. Baranchuk), Yak-1
- 4th Fighter Aviation Corps (4th IAK) (Major General of Aviation Ivan Podgorny)
  - 294th Fighter Aviation Division (Colonel V.V. Sukhoryabov), Yak-1 and Yak-7
  - 302nd Fighter Aviation Division (Colonel B.I. Litvinov), La-5
- 5th Fighter Aviation Corps (5th IAK) (Major General of Aviation Dmitry Galunov)
  - 8th Guards Fighter Aviation Division (Colonel I.P. Laryushkin), La-5
  - 205th Fighter Aviation Division (Colonel Yu. A. Nemtsevich), Yak-1 and Yak-7
  - 291st Assault Aviation Division (291st ShAD) (Colonel (promoted to Major General of Aviation February 1944) Andrey Vitruk, Il-2 in three assault regiments and Yak-1, Yak-7 and La-5 in one fighter regiment
  - 208th Night Bomber Aviation Division (208th NBAD) (Colonel Leonid Yuzeyev), U-2, R-5, Tupolev SB, Pe-2 and A-20B
  - 256th Fighter Aviation Division (Colonel N.S. Gerasimov), Yak-7 and Yak-9

=== 1 December 1944 ===
On 1 December 1944, the army included the following units:

- 2nd Guards Bomber Aviation Corps
  - 1st Guards Bomber Aviation Division
  - 8th Guards Bomber Aviation Division
- 4th Bomber Aviation Corps
  - 202nd Bomber Aviation Division
  - 219th Bomber Aviation Division
- 1st Guards Assault Aviation Corps
  - 8th Guards Assault Aviation Division
  - 9th Guards Assault Aviation Division
  - 12th Guards Fighter Aviation Division
- 2nd Guards Assault Aviation Corps
  - 5th Guards Assault Aviation Division
  - 6th Guards Assault Aviation Division
- 3rd Assault Aviation Corps
  - 307th Assault Aviation Division
  - 308th Assault Aviation Division
  - 181st Fighter Aviation Division
- 2nd Fighter Aviation Corps
  - 7th Guards Fighter Aviation Division
  - 322nd Fighter Aviation Division
- 5th Fighter Aviation Corps
  - 8th Guards Fighter Aviation Division
  - 256th Fighter Aviation Division
- 6th Guards Fighter Aviation Corps
  - 9th Guards Fighter Aviation Division
  - 22nd Guards Fighter Aviation Division
  - 23rd Guards Fighter Aviation Division
- 11th Guards Fighter Aviation Regiment
- 208th Night Bomber Aviation Division
- 1st Guards Fighter Aviation Regiment
- 98th Guards Reconnaissance Aviation Regiment
- 193rd Guards Reconnaissance Aviation Regiment
- 118th Fire Correction Aviation Regiment
- 4th Medical Aviation Regiment
- 1002nd Separate Communications Aviation Regiment
