= Artem Kotenko (general) =

Ukrainian general (1982–2022)

- Артем Котенко
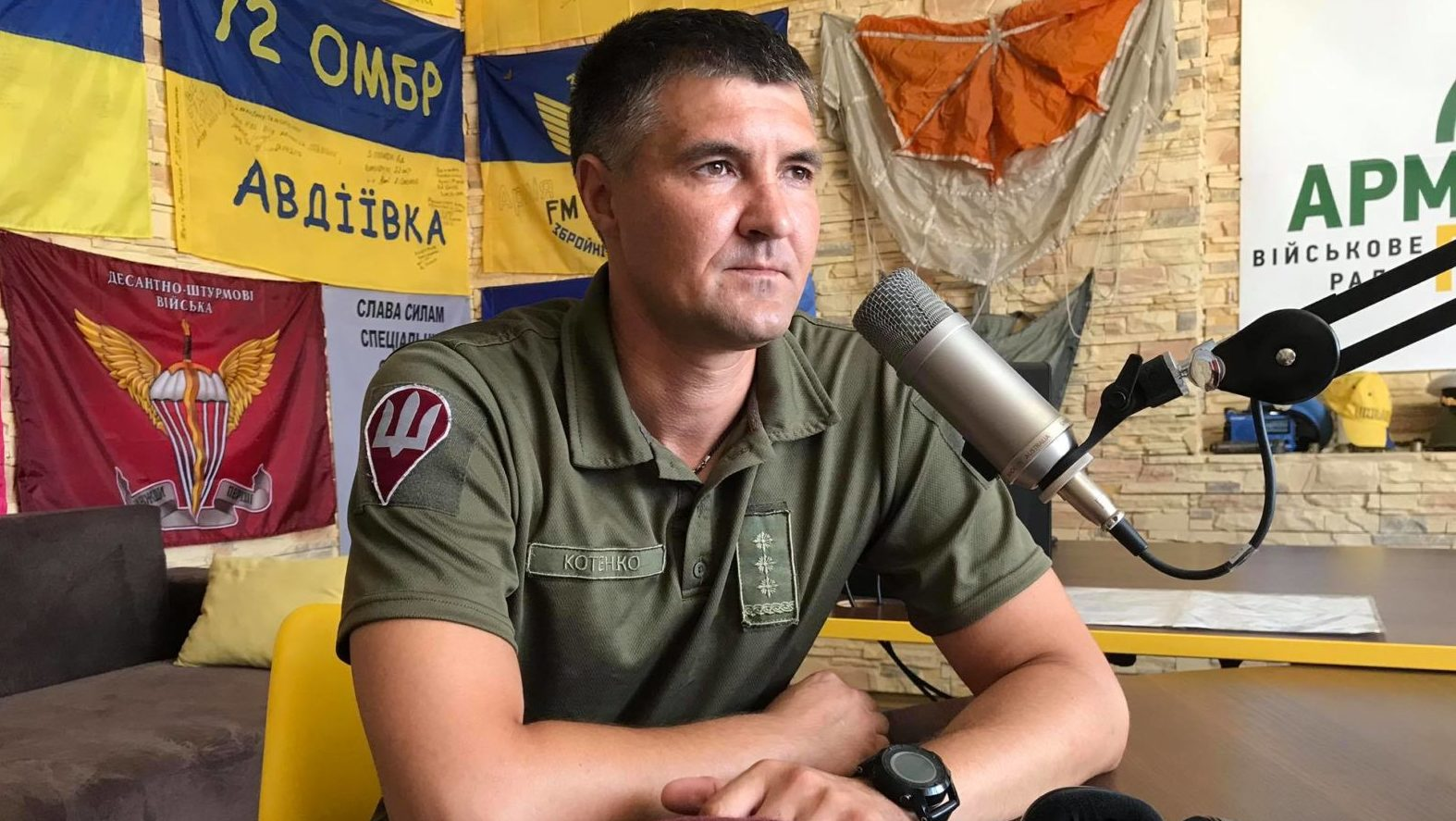
- Kotenko in c. 2020
- Born: 22 November 1982; Luhansk Oblast, Ukrainian SSR, Soviet Union
- Died: 4 November 2022 (aged 39) (Note: As per the official statement of the Zhytomyr Oblast Council. Russian sources claim that Kotenko died on 3 November.); Zhytomyr, Ukraine
- Cause of death: Shrapnel wound or car crash (Note: Per Russian sources)
- Education: Odesa Military Academy (2000)
- Spouse: Tetyana Kotenko
- Children: 3
- Military career
- Allegiance: Ukraine
- Branch: Ukrainian Air Assault Forces
- Service years: 2000–2022
- Rank: Brigadier general
- Commands: 81st Airmobile Brigade; Chief of staff of the Air Assault Forces
- Conflicts: Russo-Ukrainian war; War in Donbass; Russo-Ukrainian war (2022–present) (DOW)
- Awards: Order of Bohdan Khmelnytsky II Class; Order of Bohdan Khmelnytsky III Class

Artem Pavlovych Kotenko (Ukrainian: Артем Павлович Котенко; 22 November 1982 – 4 November 2022) was a Ukrainian brigadier general who served as chief of staff of the Ukrainian Air Assault Forces of the Ukrainian Armed Forces. He had previously served in the 25th, 79th and 81st air assault brigades and fought in the Donbas war.

Kotenko, aged 39, died under disputed circumstances in Zhytomyr on 4 November 2022. His death was confirmed by local authorities in 2024.

== Early life and education ==
Kotenko was born in Luhansk Oblast, Ukraine, on 22 November 1982. He graduated from the Odesa Military Academy in 2000. He later graduated from the National Defence University of Ukraine after two years of studies.

== Military career ==
Kotenko began his career as a military officer in the Ukrainian Air Assault Forces. He served as a platoon commander and then as a battalion deputy commander in the 25th Airborne Brigade. He later became a battalion commander in the 79th Air Assault Brigade, which he led against separatist forces during the war in Donbas. Afterwards, he held a role of the deputy commander and, from 2018 to 2021, the role of the commander of the 81st Airmobile Brigade. He ultimately became the chief of staff of the Air Assault Forces in 2021, a position he held until his death in 2022. He was promoted to brigadier general on 21 November 2021 under presidential decree.

For his service in the Russo-Ukrainian war, Kotenko was decorated with the Order of Bohdan Khmelnytsky 2nd and 3rd classes. He was accused by the Russian Investigative Committee of being one of the 15 brigade commanders that committed genocide of the Russian population of Donbas during the war.

== Death ==
Reports about Kotenko's death began to appear among Russian milbloggers on 9 November 2022 with a photo of his mutilated car circulating on the Internet. Yuri Kotenok claimed that Kotenko died as a result of the wounds he sustained during Russian airstrikes on Zhytomyr. Boris Rozhin, another milblogger, suggested that Kotenko, alongside colonel Volodymyr Oleksiyovych Levchuk, who served as the Deputy Secretary of Veterans Affairs of Ukraine prior to the Russian invasion, might have died as a result of a car crash on 3 November. His status remained unclear until two years later, when the Zhytomyr Oblast Council made a Facebook post mourning the death of Kotenko and Levchuk. The cause of their deaths was not specified.

Kotenko was posthumously decorated with the Medal "For Diligent Service", 1st class on 5 December 2025.

== Personal life ==
Kotenko was married to Kotenko Tetyana Mykhailivna and had three children: two sons and one daughter.

== Awards and decorations ==
- Order of Bohdan Khmelnytsky, 3rd class (2014)
- Order of Bohdan Khmelnytsky, 2nd class (2016)
- Medal "For Diligent Service", 1st class (2025, posthumously)

== See also ==
- List of Ukrainian flag officers losses during the Russo-Ukrainian war
