= Voznesensk (disambiguation) =

Voznesensk is a city in the eponymous raion in Mykolaiv Oblast, Ukraine.

Voznesensk may also refer to:

- Voznesensk (air base), Voznesensk, Mykolaiv, Ukraine; a Ukrainian airforce base
- Voznesensk Raion, an administrative district in Mykolaiv Oblast of Ukraine
- Ivanovo, a city in Russia previously known as Ivanovo-Voznesensk
