= Gorodnya =

Gorodnya may refer to:

- Horodnia, a city in Chernihiv Oblast, Ukraine
- Horodnia (air base), an air base in Chernihiv Oblast, Ukraine
- Gorodnya River, a river in Moscow, Russia
- Gorodnya, name of several rural settlements in Russia
- Horodnia, Ichnia Raion, a village in Chernihiv Oblast, Ukraine
