= 5th Air Army =

5th Air Army (1988–1994) Air Forces of the Odessa Military District (1980–1988) 5th Air Army (1968–1980) 48th Air Army (1949–1968) 5th Air Army (1942–1949)
- Active: 1942–1994
- Country: Soviet Union; Ukraine
- Branch: Soviet Air Forces; Ukrainian Air Force
- Part of: Odessa Military District (from 1945)
- Garrison/HQ: Odessa (from 1945)
- Engagements: World War II
- Decorations: Order of the Red Banner

Commanders
- Notable commanders: Sergei Goryunov; Pavel Kutakhov; Yevgeny Shaposhnikov

The 5th Air Army (Russian: 5-я воздушная армия; romanized 5 Vozdushnaya Armiya) was an air army of the Soviet Air Forces and later the Ukrainian Air Force. First formed in 1942 during World War II, the army provided air support to Soviet forces through the rest of the war, and was renumbered as the 48th Air Army in 1949. It was stationed in the Odessa Military District during the postwar period, and in 1968 its original number was restored. Between 1980 and 1988 it was known as the Air Forces of the Odessa Military District. Redesignated as the 5th Air Army again in 1988, it became part of the Ukrainian Air Force after the dissolution of the Soviet Union, and was converted into an aviation corps in 1994.

== World War II ==
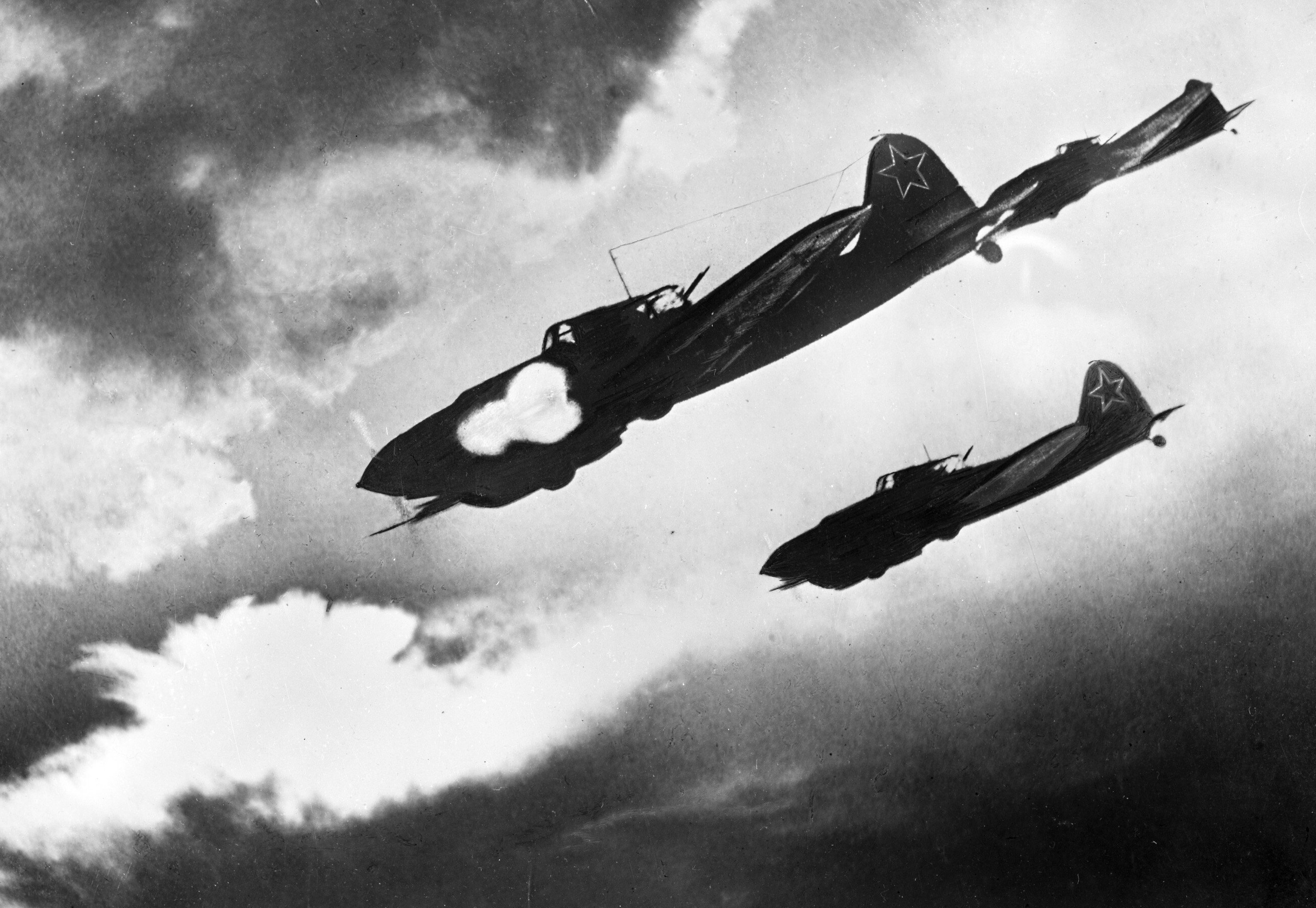
Ilyushin Il-2 ground attack aircraft, 1943, of the type used by assault units in the army

The 5th Air Army was first created during the World War II, formed from the Air Forces of the North Caucasus Front on 6 June 1942 in accordance with an order dated 3 June, consisting of the 236th, 237th, and 265th Fighter Aviation Divisions (IAD), the 238th Assault Aviation Division (ShAD), the 132nd Bomber Aviation Division (BAD), and two separate regiments. It was commanded by Major General Sergei Goryunov, who led it for the entire war. From July to December, the air army provided support for the Soviet defense of the North Caucasus. On 5 September, it became part of the Transcaucasian Front, but was transferred to the North Caucasus Front on 4 February 1943. In April 1943, alongside the 4th Air Army and the aviation of the Black Sea Fleet, it fought in battles for air superiority in the Kuban.

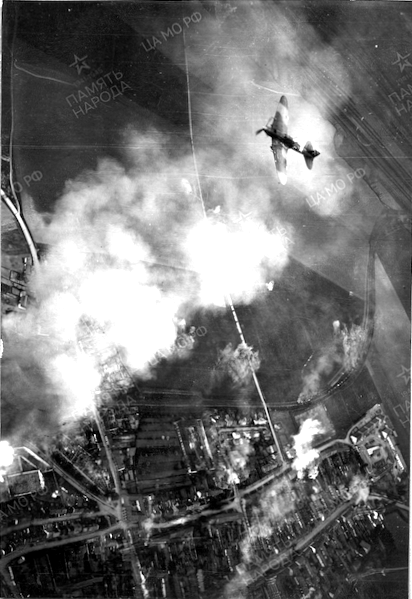
An Il-2 of the army attacking a German position southeast of Břeclav during the Bratislava–Brno Offensive, April 1945

On 24 April, the army was withdrawn to the Reserve of the Supreme High Command and relocated to the Steppe Military District, which became part of the Steppe Front on 9 July. During the Battle of Kursk in July and August 1943 it fought as part of the front, and comprised the 7th Mixed Aviation Corps, 8th Mixed Aviation Corps, 3rd Fighter Aviation Corps, and the 7th Fighter Aviation Corps (IAK), numbering around 563 aircraft. On 1 August it comprised the 1st Bomber Aviation Corps (1st Guards, 293rd Bomber Aviation Division), 1st Assault Aviation Corps (203rd, 266th Fighter Aviation Divisions, 292nd Assault Aviation Division), 3rd Fighter Aviation Corps (265th, 278th Fighter Aviation Divisions), 4th Fighter Aviation Corps (294th and 302nd Fighter Aviation Divisions), 7th Fighter Aviation Corps (304th Fighter Aviation Division), and the 511th Reconnaissance Aviation Regiment. From August, the army fought in the Belgorod-Khar'kov Offensive Operation and then the Battle of the Dnieper. On 20 October, the front became the 2nd Ukrainian Front.

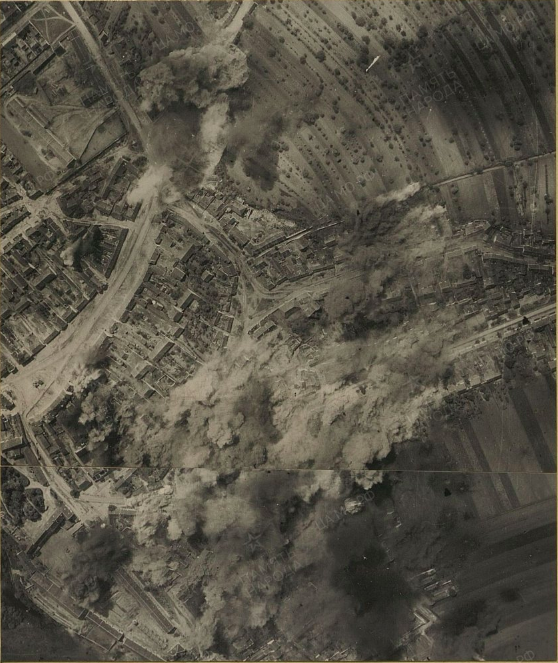
A composite photograph of damage inflicted on Drnholec by an A-20G Boston bombing raid by a unit of the army during the Prague Offensive

During 1944, the army fought in the Kirovograd Offensive, the Korsun-Shevchenkovsky Offensive, the Second Jassy–Kishinev Offensive, the Belgrade Offensive, and the Budapest Offensive, the last of which extended until February 1945. In 1945, the army fought in the Vienna Offensive and the Prague Offensive. The 5th Air Army flew about 180,000 sorties during the war.

== Postwar ==
In 1945, the army was relocated to Odessa, where it joined the Odessa Military District. It was renumbered the 48th Air Army on 10 January 1949 and from 1947 to 1958 controlled the few Soviet air units stationed in Romania. The 119th Fighter Aviation Division, with the 86th Guards, 161st, and 684th Guards Fighter Aviation Regiments, joined the army in October 1951 after it relocated to Tiraspol. On 4 April 1968, the army became the 5th Air Army again, restoring its original World War II designation. On 15 January 1974, the air army received the Order of the Red Banner for successfully mastering new aviation technology and strengthening the country's combat readiness. In 1980, the air army became the Air Forces of the Odessa Military District (VVS OdVO), but in May 1988 it became the 5th Air Army again.

By the 1980s, in event of a war with NATO, plans were made to use the 119th Fighter Aviation Division to blockade the Bosporus and Dardanelles Straits. 86th Guards IAP aircraft were nuclear-capable, and according to a different plan, the regiment was to move to bases in Bulgaria and Romania in event of conflict and launch strikes on Turkish airfields with Tactical nuclear weapons from there. It was assumed that after such an attack, the aircraft would land in Bulgaria, and for testing cooperation, exercises were held during the 1980s, during which a squadron of the 684th Guards Fighter Aviation Regiment landed in Bulgaria.

In summer 1988, a MiG-23UB aircraft of the 684th Guards Fighter Aviation Regiment crashed: while landing at the Tiraspol airfield on the glide path, a bird hit the air intake. The pilots steered the plane to the left of the city center and the beach and successfully ejected. The instructor, Major Chmut, left the plane first according to the ejection order, the second pilot managed to leave the plane at the last moment, his parachute opened due to the explosion of the fallen plane, which hit the shore 3 meters from the water. When the plane crashed, two children who were swimming away from the beach along the dam were severely burned; one died.

In December 1989, the entire 119th Division (including the 86th, which became part of the Moldovan Air Force upon the breakup of the Soviet Union) transferred to the VVS Black Sea Fleet, leaving the army with only a few regiments. The Army was still serving there when the Soviet Union dissolved, and consisted in 1991–92 of a single MiG-29 fighter regiment and a Su-17 reconnaissance regiment.

On the breakup of the Soviet Union, the army became part of the Ukrainian Air Force. The formation was later downgraded in status by the Ukrainian Air Force. On 18 March 1994 the Ukrainian 5th Air Army was redesignated the 5th Air Corps. On 1 January 2001 the corps consisted of the 9th Fighter Aviation Brigade (Belbek), the 161st Fighter Aviation Regiment (Limanskoye), the 642nd Fighter Aviation Regiment (Martynovskoe), the 299th Independent Assault Aviation Regiment (Saki), the 511th Separate Reconnaissance Aviation Regiment (Buyalyk), the 149th Aviation Base (Kupyansk) and two other aviation regiments, the 2nd Separate Mixed at Odessa, and the 44th Bomber Aviation at Kanatovo. In December 2004, the 5th Air Corps and the 60th Air Defense Corps combined to form Air Command South.

In 2001, the Russian Air Force formed the 5th Air and Air Defence Forces Army, but apart from the same number, the new formation shares few links to the old 5th Air Army.

=== 1988 Soviet structure ===
- Headquarters – Odessa
- 29th Independent Training Regiment (Berdyansk) (Sukhoi Su-17) (disbanded 1996)
- 90th Independent Assault Aviation Regiment (Artsyz) (Sukhoi Su-25) (disbanded 1989; directive issued 22.7.89, and all aircraft was transferred to Saki, Krymskaya Oblast.)
- 642nd Guards Independent Fighter-Bomber Regiment (Voznesensk, Nikolayev Oblast)
- 827th Independent Reconnaissance Regiment (Limanskoye)
- 119th Fighter Aviation Division (Military Unit No. 06846) (Tiraspol Airport), Moldavian SSR)
  - 86th Guards Fighter Aviation Regiment (Markuleshty, near Florești, Moldavian SSR) (Mikoyan MiG-29) (became part of Moldovan Armed Forces)
  - 161st Fighter Aviation Regiment (Limanskoye, Odessa Oblast) with Mikoyan MiG-29 and Mikoyan-Gurevich MiG-23
  - 684th Guards Orshanskiy Red Banner Fighter Aviation Regiment (Tiraspol Airport) (MiG-23MLD)(disbanded 1989, after a flying accident in July 1988, which killed several civilians in Tiraspol. Former 133 Guards IAP)

=== c.1993 Ukrainian structure ===
Data from

- 32nd Bomber Aviation Division
  - 7th Bomber Aviation Regiment (Starokonstantinov)
  - 727th Guards Bomber Aviation Regiment (Kanatovo, Kirovograd Oblast)
  - 805th Signals Battalion
- 130th Fighter Aviation Division (85th, 831st Fighter Aviation Regiments, 463rd Signals Battalion)
- 511th Independent Reconnaissance Aviation Regiment (Buyalyk, Odessa Oblast)
- 642nd Guards Fighter-Bomber Aviation Regiment (Martynovskoe/Voznesensk, Nikolayev Oblast) (MiG-29) – disbanded 2001.
- 299th Independent Assault Aviation Regiment (Saki) (Sukhoi Su-25)
- 827th Independent Reconnaissance Regiment (Limanskoye)
- 112th Independent Composite Aviation Squadron (Odessa)
- 208th Independent Helicopter Squadron for Electronic Warfare (Buyalyk, Odessa Oblast) – disbanded 1998.
- 43rd Independent Signals Regiment (Odessa (city))
- 604th Military Control Centre (Odessa (city))
- 2952nd Technical Repair Base
- 5460th Aviation Technical Base

== Commanders ==
During its existence, the 5th Air Army and its successor formations were commanded by the following officers:

- Lieutenant General (promoted to Major General May 1943, Colonel General March 1944) Sergei Goryunov (June 1942–May 1946)
- Colonel General Stepan Rubanov (May 1946–September 1947)
- Major General Dmitry Popov (September 1947–November 1949)
- Lieutenant General Dmitry Galunov (November 1949–December 1950)
- Lieutenant General Daniil Kondratyuk (December 1950–March 1952)
- Colonel General Boris Sidnev (March 1952–April 1961)
- Lieutenant General Pavel Dankevich (April–August 1961)
- Lieutenant General Pavel Kutakhov (August 1961–July 1967)
- Lieutenant General Vladimir Aleksenko (October 1967–June 1974)
- Lieutenant General Igor Trofimov (July 1974–April 1977)
- Lieutenant General Vladimir Shmagin (April 1977–December 1979)
- Lieutenant General Alexey Biryukov (December 1979–March 1985)
- Colonel General Yevgeny Shaposhnikov (March 1985–June 1987)
- Lieutenant General Anatoly Vasiliev (July 1989–January 1991)
- Lieutenant General Mikhail Lipatov (January–August 1991)
- Major General Viktor Strelnikov (August 1991–January 1992)
