= Stepan Krasovsky =

Soviet military officer (1897–1983)

- Степан Акимович Красовский
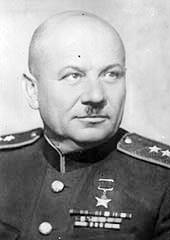
- Born: 20 August 1897; Glukhi, Bychaw Raion, Mogilev Governorate, Russian Empire
- Died: 21 April 1983 (aged 85); Moscow, Russian SFSR, Soviet Union
- Burial place: Garrison Cemetery, Monino
- Military career
- Allegiance: Russian Empire (1916–1917); Soviet Union (1917–1983)
- Service years: 1916–1983
- Rank: Marshal of the aviation
- Commands: 2nd Air Army; 17th Air Army
- Conflicts: World War I; Russian Civil War; World War II; Winter War; Eastern Front
- Awards: Hero of the Soviet Union

Stepan Akimovich Krasovsky (Russian: Степан Акимович Красовский; Belarusian: Сцяпан Акімавіч Красоўскі, romanized: Stsyapan Akimavich Krasowski; 20 August [O.S. 8 August] 1897 – 21 April 1983) was a Soviet Air Force marshal of the aviation.

== Early life, World War I and Russian Civil War ==
Born on 20 August 1897 to a peasant family in the village of Glukhi, Mogilev Governorate, Krasovsky graduated from the higher primary school in Bykhov in 1915, and worked at the Seletsk post office. He was drafted into the Imperial Russian Army in May 1916 during World War I. Graduating from courses for wireless telegraph mechanics, he was promoted to unter-ofitser and appointed chief of a radio station in the aviation detachment of the 20th Army Corps of the Western Front. After the February Revolution, Krasovsky was transferred to the 25th Corps Aviation Detachment.

In October 1917 Krasovsky joined the Red Guards. He was transferred with the aviation detachment to the city of Yefremov in December 1917, where he joined the Red Army in February 1918 during the Russian Civil War. Krasovsky served as a motor mechanic in the 3rd Tver Aviation Detachment, then from October 1918 was a motor mechanic and military commissar of the 33rd Aviation Detachment. He fought on the Eastern Front and on the Caucasian Front, participating in the Red Army invasion of Azerbaijan. From May 1920 Krasovsky served as an observer, and then as commissar of the 1st Azerbaijan Aviation Detachment and the Air Force of the 11th Army. He participated in the suppression of anti-Soviet revolt in Lankaran Uyezd and Yelizavetpol Uyezds during September and October. In early 1921, he was appointed military commissar of the Field Headquarters of the Air Force of the 11th Army, and took part in the Red Army invasion of Georgia.

== Interwar period ==
After the end of the war, Krasovsky continued to serve in the Soviet Air Force as a commissar until 1925: as military commissar of the 47th Consolidated Transcaucasus Aviation Detachment and the Red Moscow Squadron of the Air Forces of the Moscow Military District. In November 1927 he graduated from the KUVNAS of the Air Force at the Zhukovsky Military Air Academy and was appointed commander and military commissar of the 3rd Aviation Detachment of the Air Force of the Moscow Military District. In March 1933, he became commander and military commissar of the 253rd Light Assault Aviation Brigade of the Air Forces of the Leningrad Military District. Krasovsky received the rank of kombrig when personal ranks were introduced in December 1935.

In 1936, Krasovsky graduated from the operations department of the Zhukovsky Military Air Academy and was appointed commander and military commissar of the 147th High Speed Bomber Aviation Brigade of the Air Forces of the Leningrad Military District. From July 1937 he commanded the 1st Aviation Corps of the district, which controlled the brigades of the district air force. In April 1938 he was appointed chief of the 7th Brigade Aviation Region of the district, and in October 1939 chief of the Murmansk region air bases. When the Winter War began, Krasovsky was appointed commander of the Air Forces of the 14th Army, simultaneously serving as commander of the Murmansk Aviation Brigade. In January 1940 he became deputy commander of the Air Forces of the 14th Army for bomber aviation.

After the end of the war, he was appointed chief of the Krasnodar Military Aviation School in April 1940, and was promoted to major general on 4 June when the rank system changed. From February 1941 he served as assistant commander of the Air Forces of the North Caucasus Military District for military educational institutions. In June he was appointed commander of the district air force.

== World War II ==
After Operation Barbarossa began, Krasovsky continued to serve as commander of the district air force, and in October 1941 was appointed commander of the Air Forces of the 56th Separate Army of the Southern Front. In this position he took part in the Battle of Rostov. From January 1942, he commanded the Air Forces of the Bryansk Front. Krasovsky took command of the 2nd Air Army in May, commanding it on the Bryansk and Voronezh Fronts. Under his command, the army provided air support during defensive operations in spring and summer 1942 in the Voronezh sector. In November 1942 he was appointed commander of the 17th Air Army, part of the Stalingrad and Southwestern Fronts, and promoted to lieutenant general on 20 December. Under his command, the army provided air support in the Soviet counteroffensive at Stalingrad, the Ostrogozhsk–Rossosh offensive, and the offensive in the Donbass. Krasovsky returned to command of the 2nd Air Army in March 1943 and would command it for the rest of the war. Under his command, the army took part in battles on the Southwestern, Voronezh and 1st Ukrainian Fronts: the Battle of Kursk, Battle of the Dnieper, the Battle of Kiev, the Zhitomir–Berdichev offensive, Korsun–Shevchenkovsky offensive, Proskurov-Chernovitsy Offensive, Lvov–Sandomierz offensive, Lower Silesian offensive, and the Berlin Offensive. On 4 February 1944, he was promoted to Colonel-General. On 29 May 1945, he was awarded the title Hero of the Soviet Union.

== Postwar ==
After the end of the war, Krasovsky continued to command the 2nd Air Army, based in Austria. He was sent to command the Air Forces of the Far East in May 1947. From September 1951 to August 1952 he was the head military advisor to the People's Liberation Army Air Force. In August 1952 he returned to the Soviet Union to command the Air Forces of the Moscow Military District. From June 1953 to April 1955 Krasovsky served successively as commander of the Air Forces of the North Caucasus and Belorussian Military Districts. Appointed commander of the 26th Air Army in the Belorussian Military District in April 1955, Krasovsky left operational command in April 1956 to become chief of the Red Banner Military Air Academy, a position he held until May 1968, being promoted to marshal of aviation on 8 May 1959. He was also a member of the Central Auditing Commission from 1961 to 1966. Retiring in October 1968, he was reinstated in the air force in July 1970 by Politburo decision and appointed a military inspector and advisor of the Group of Inspectors General, a sinecure position for aging senior officers. Krasovsky died on 21 April 1983 in Moscow and was buried in Monino.

== Honours and awards ==
- Hero of the Soviet Union (29 May 1945)
- Six Orders of Lenin
- Order of the October Revolution
- Order of the Red Banner, four times
- Order of Suvorov, 1st and 2nd class
- Order of Kutuzov, 1st class
- Order of Bogdan Khmelnitsky, 1st class
- Order of the Red Star
- Order for Service to the Homeland in the Armed Forces of the USSR, 3rd class
