= Vladimir Aleksenko =

Ground-attack aviation squadron and regimental commander

Vladimir Avramovich Aleksenko
- Владимир Аврамович Алексенко
- Born: 27 January 1923; Kievskoye village, Krymsky District, Krasnodar Krai, Soviet Union
- Died: 16 June 1995 (aged 72); Odesa, Ukraine
- Military career
- Allegiance: Soviet Union
- Branch: Soviet Air Force
- Service years: 1941 – 1978
- Rank: Lieutenant general
- Commands: 15th Guards Attack Aviation Regiment; 5th Air Army
- Conflicts: World War II; Leningrad-Novgorod Offensive; Vyborg-Petrozavodsk Offensive; Baltic Offensive; East Prussian Offensive
- Awards: Hero of the Soviet Union (twice)

Vladimir Avramovich Aleksenko (Russian: Владимир Аврамович Алексенко; 27 January 1923 – 16 June 1995) was a ground-attack aviation squadron and regimental commander during World War II who was twice awarded the title Hero of the Soviet Union. He was awarded his first Hero of the Soviet Union award for making 107 attack sorties, and his second award was for making another 143 sorties, but by the end of the war he reached a total of 292 attack sorties. After the war he remained in the military, becoming a became a Lieutenant general after graduation from the Military Academy of the General Staff. Between 1967 and 1974, he commanded the 5th Air Army.

== Early life ==
Aleksenko was born on 27 January 1923 in the village of Kievskoye in Krasnodar Krai to a Russian peasant family. In 1940, he graduated from high school and participated in the Krasnodar flying club. In May 1941, he was drafted into the Red Army.

== World War II ==
In 1942, Aleksenko graduated from the Krasnodar Military Pilots' Flying School. He joined the Communist Party in 1943. In February 1943, Aleksenko became an Ilyushin Il-2 pilot in the 15th Guards Attack Aviation Regiment on the Leningrad Front with the rank of junior lieutenant. During early 1944, Aleksenko flew attack sorties during the Leningrad–Novgorod Offensive, which broke the siege of Leningrad. In the summer of 1944 he participated in the Vyborg–Petrozavodsk Offensive, which helped end the Continuation War. On 12 June, Aleksenko and his flight engaged German fighters, with Aleksenko shooting down two of them. In the fall, he flew sorties in the Baltic Offensive.

From January 1945, Aleksenko, the a squadron commander, fought in the East Prussian Offensive. In February, he became the regimental deputy commander. On 27 April, he was awarded the title Hero of the Soviet Union and the Order of Lenin for reportedly making 107 successful assault sorties against German troop and equipment concentrations. In February 1945 he was promoted to assistant commander of his regiment, and that month he was nominated to receive a second gold star for having flown 250 sorties. He received it after the end of the war, and by that time he had flown 292 sorties against German fortifications, airfields and troop concentrations. He reportedly destroyed numerous aircraft on the ground, 33 tanks, 118 vehicles, 53 rail cars, 85 rail carriages, 54 anti-aircraft guns, 10 warehouses with ammunition, 27 artillery guns, 12 mortars. His attacks had also reportedly killed 1300 German soldiers.

== Postwar ==
In 1954, Aleksenko graduated from the Air Force Academy. In 1952, he graduated from the Military Academy of the General Staff. Between 1959 and 1963, he served as a Deputy of the Supreme Soviet of the Ukrainian SSR at its 5th convocation. Between 1967 and 1974, he was commander of the 5th Air Army in Odesa. He was promoted to lieutenant general in 1968. Between 1971 and 1975, Aleksenko again was a deputy of the Ukrainian SSR Supreme Soviet for its 8th convocation. He retired in 1978 and lived in Odesa. He died on 16 June 1995 and is buried at the city's Second Christian Cemetery.

== Awards ==
- Twice Hero of the Soviet Union (19 April 1945 and 29 June 1945)
- Order of Lenin (19 April 1945)
- Four Order of the Red Banner (25 July 1944, 5 November 1944, 22 February 1945, and 21 February 1974)
- Order of Alexander Nevsky (2 November 1944)
- Two Order of the Patriotic War (1st class - 11 March 1985; 2nd class - 12 August 1943)
- Two Order of the Red Star (26 July 1943 and 30 December 1974)
- Order of 9 September 1944 (October 1977)
- campaign and jubilee medals
