= Velyka Krucha Air Base =

Velikaya Krucha
- IATA: none; ICAO: UKHM

Summary
- Airport type: Military
- Operator: Soviet Air Forces
- Location: Pyriatyn
- Elevation AMSL: 384 ft / 117 m
- Coordinates: 50°9′0″N 032°32′0″E
- Interactive map of Velikaya Krucha

Runways
Direction	Length		Surface
Direction	ft	m	Surface
	6,562	2,000	Concrete

Velyka Krucha was an air base near Chernihiv, Ukraine located in Velyka Krucha village, 10 km south of Pyriatyn. It was a training base, and has been largely abandoned.

Units stationed at Velikaya Krucha include the 443rd Aviation Training Regiment (443 UAP) flying 101 L-39 jet trainers during the early 1990s. Through the late 1980s and 1990s the 443rd Regiment was part of the Kharkhov Higher Military Aviation School of Pilots, in turn itself part of the 17th Air Army.
