= Velyka Krucha =

Rural locality in Poltava Oblast, Ukraine

Velyka Krucha Velyka Krucha
- Village
- Interactive map of Velyka Krucha
- Coordinates: 50°11′24″N 32°33′36″E
- Country: Ukraine
- Region: Poltava Oblast
- District: Lubny Raion
- Founded: 17th Century

Population (2001)
  - Total: 1,886
- Postal code: 37052
- Area code: 05358

Velyka Krucha is a village in Lubny Raion, Poltava Oblast, Ukraine. It belongs to Pyriatyn urban hromada, one of the hromadas of Ukraine. It was home to a military air base.

Until 18 July 2020, Velyka Krucha belonged to Pyriatyn Raion. The raion was abolished in July 2020 as part of the administrative reform of Ukraine, which reduced the number of raions of Poltava Oblast to four. The area of Pyriatyn Raion was merged into Lubny Raion.

== Geographic location ==
The village of Velyka Krucha is located on the right bank of the Uday River. Upstream, at a distance of 3 km, lies the town of Pyriatyn, and downstream, at a distance of 1 km, is the village of Povstyn. On the opposite bank is the village of Deimanivka. The river in this area is winding, forming limans, oxbow lakes, and swampy ponds. The highway E40 passes through the village.

=== History ===
- The village of Velyka Krucha is located on a high bank (krucha) of the Uday River near Pyriatyn, along the M03 highway (Kyiv–Poltava). It has been known since the 17th century, when Prince Jeremi Wiśniowiecki ordered the construction of a dam and a mill at this location.
- The Church of St. John the Theologian (Ioanno-Bogoslovska Church) has been known since 1758.
- The village appears as "Krucha" on a detailed map of the Russian Empire and neighboring foreign territories from 1816.
