= 10th Assault Aviation Corps =

10th Odessa-Vienna Assault Aviation Corps
- Active: 1943–1946
- Country: Soviet Union
- Branch: Soviet Air Force
- Engagements: World War II
- Honorifics: Odessa; Vienna

Commanders
- Notable commanders: Oleg Tolstikov

The 10th Odessa-Vienna Assault Aviation Corps (Russian: 10-й штурмовой авиационный Одесско-Венский корпус) was an aviation corps of the Soviet Air Force during World War II, flying the Ilyushin Il-2 ground attack aircraft.

Formed in March 1943 as the 9th Mixed Aviation Corps, the corps was part of the 17th Air Army and distinguished itself in the Odessa Offensive, receiving the name of Odessa as an honorific. Redesignated as the 10th Assault Aviation Corps in September 1944, the corps flew ground attack missions in Hungary and ended the war in the Vienna offensive, receiving the name of Vienna as a second honorific.

== History ==
The 9th Mixed Aviation Corps (SAK) was formed in March 1943 in the area of Millerovo under the command of Colonel Oleg Tolstikov, who commanded it for the rest of the war. The corps was assigned to the 17th Air Army of the Southwestern Front in May. It included the 295th Fighter Aviation Division (IAD) flying the Lavochkin La-5 and the 305th and 306th Assault Aviation Divisions (ShAD) flying the Ilyushin Il-2. The majority of the army's units had combat experience, but in the 9th SAK out of its six assault regiments only the 672nd Assault Aviation Regiment (ShAP) had seen combat. The corps units also flew combat sorties during its period of formation. For combat its units, with 192 Il-2s and 91 La-5s, between 30 May and 5 June the 9th SAK relocated from the airfields of Millerovo and Gluboky to the airfields of Pokrovskoye, Lantratovka, Budyonnovka, Olshany and Nizhnyaya Duvanka. During the Battle of Kursk, the ground attack units of the corps attacked bridges across the Seversky Donets between 5 and 7 July, losing 55 percent of its original Il-2s, with one Il-2 shot down for every 2.8 sorties launched, heavier losses than other ground attack units of the 17th Air Army. The 672nd ShAP lost 23 aircraft, the 995th ShAP 18, the 991st ShAP 14, the 237th ShAP 18, the 175th ShAP 13, and the 955th ShAP 17. These losses were attributed in reports to a lack of suppression of German anti-aircraft fire and failures of unit commanders to clearly explain rendezvous procedures, as well as ineffective fighter cover due to fighters climbing too high over targets while the Il-2s made their attack runs. Despite these losses, the 955th ShAP repulsed the first German attempt to cross the river on the night of 5–6 July.

The corps provided air support in the Belgorod–Kharkov offensive operation, Donbas strategic offensive, Zaporozhye offensive, and Odessa Offensive. During September and October 1943, during the Battle of the Dnieper, the corps provided air support to the troops of the front in the elimination of the fortified German Zaporozhye bridgehead. Then it provided air support in the liberation of right-bank Ukraine, distinguishing itself in the liberation of Apostolovo, Nikolayev, and Odessa. In September 1944 the 9th Mixed Aviation Corps was reorganized as the 10th Assault Aviation Corps, continuing as part of the 3rd Ukrainian Front. The corps fought in the Second Jassy–Kishinev offensive and occupied Moldova and Izmail Oblast, provided air support for the pushing out of German troops from Romania, Bulgaria, and Yugoslavia, and the breakthrough of the German defensive lines on the right bank of the Danube, the encirclement and destruction of German troops in Budapest, the Balaton Defensive operation and the Vienna offensive. For distinguishing itself in the liberation of Odessa and Vienna the corps received the names of these cities as an honorific.

In total, the corps lost 729 aircraft during the war and 704 pilots and gunners, flying a total of 55,444 sorties.

Postwar, the corps headquarters was disbanded in 1946.
