= Bilhorod-Dnistrovskyi Border Detachment =

25th Bilhorod-Dnistrovskyi Border Detachment
- 25-й Білгород-Дністровський прикордонний загін
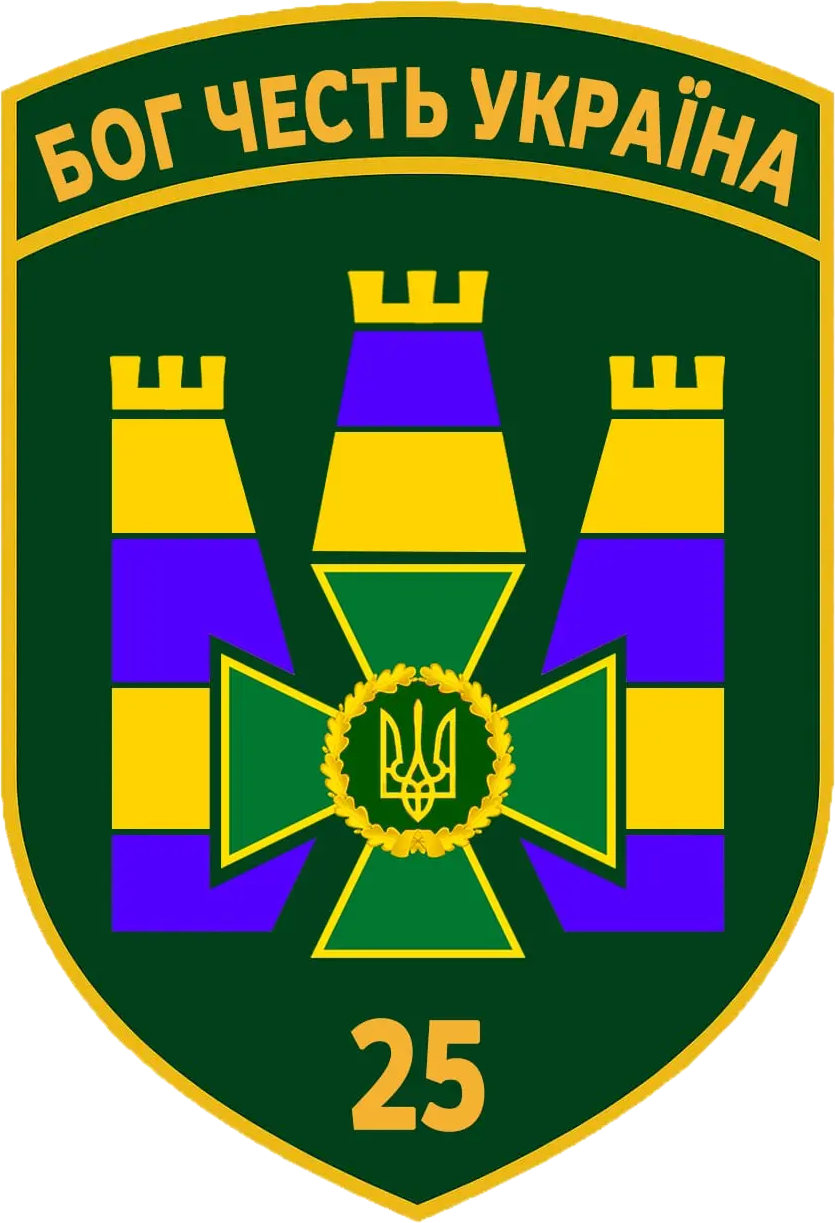
- Founded: 1992
- Country: Ukraine
- Allegiance: Ministry of Internal Affairs
- Branch: State Border Guard Service of Ukraine
- Type: Brigade
- Role: Border Guard
- Part of: State Border Guard Service of Ukraine
- Garrison/HQ: Bilhorod-Dnistrovskyi
- Engagements: Russo-Ukrainian war: War in Donbass; Zelenopillia rocket attack; Fights on the Ukrainian–Russian border (2014); Russian invasion of Ukraine; Eastern Ukraine campaign; Battle of Vovchansk; Southern Ukraine campaign; Odesa strikes (2022-present)
- Decorations: For Courage and Bravery

Commanders
- Current commander: Colonel Serhiy Sokolovskyi

The Bilhorod-Dnistrovskyi Border Detachment (MUN 2197) is a brigade level detachment of the Southern Regional Department of the State Border Service of Ukraine. The detachment guards the Ukraine-Moldova border in three raions (Rozdilna Raion, Biliaivka Raion and Bilhorod-Dnistrovskyi Raion) of the Odessa Oblast, with a total length of 401,551 km, 308,286 km on land, 64,965 km on river and 28.3 km on lake.

== History ==
On 4 May 1992, in Soborne, the Berezyn border control detachment was established in the wake of Transnistrian War with Colonel Mykola Mykolayovych Gurskyi being appointed as its first commander. In 1998, it became the Berezyn Border Detachment. On 3 November 1999, the unit was awarded the Battle Flag. In 2004, the command of the detachment and support units were moved to the Bilhorod-Dnistrovskyi and it changed its name to the Bilhorod-Dnistrovskyi border detachment.

Following the start of the War in Donbass, it saw combat against separatists. On 11 July 2014, at approximately 4:30 in the morning, BM-21 Grads attacked Ukrainian armoured group in what became known as Zelenopillia rocket attack, a guardsman of the detachment (Dmytro Vasyliovych Syrbu) along with 36 others were killed in the attack. It also saw heavy combat in Sverdlovsk. On 25 July 2014, a guardsman of the detachment (Hryhoriy Fedorovych Gorchak) was wounded in Sverdlovsk as a result of constant artillery and tank shelling and died 2 days later. On 2 August 2014, a border guard convoy was attacked by separatists in Sverdlovsk as a result of which, a guardsman of the detachment (Mykhailo Hryhorovych Kabak) was killed. On 6 August 2014, during an organized breakthrough from the encirclement in Sverdlovsk, the column of the border guards came under fire. A guardsman of the detachment (Oleg Volodymyrovych Kislytskyi) who had already been wounded in the leg retreated to the forest strips but was killed, his vehicle was also completely destroyed.

On 5 May 2018, the consecration of a church in honor of the Holy Equal-to-the-Apostles Prince Volodymyr the Great of the UOC KP took place at the detachment's headquarters. On 30 December 2020, the detachment prevented illegal logging attempts. In 2021, it was reinforced by aviation units.

Following the Russian invasion of Ukraine, it engaged Russian forces during the Eastern Ukraine campaign. In August 2022, it received four UMS 425CC patrol boats from the EU. On 28 September 2023, the detachment detained 5 people illegally trying to cross the border. Border guards of the detachment hit and destroyed a Russian Shahed drone on 13 December 2023 which fell into the water. On 29 December 2023, a guardsman of the detachment (Vlasov Volodymyr Volodymyrovych) was killed during the Battle of Vovchansk. On 14 March 2024, the dead body of a soldier of the detachment with bullet wounds was discovered in Odessa Oblast. On 9 May 2023, the detachment destroyed two Russian Shahed drones. On 25 July 2024, the Detachment detained 15 people trying to illegally cross the border. On 9 November 2024, the detachment detained four people trying to illegally cross the border into Moldova.

On 20 April 2026 the unit was awarded the Presidential Award For Courage and Bravery by the President of Ukraine Volodymyr Zelenskyy.

== Structure ==
The border detachment is composed of:

- Detachment Management and Headquarters
- Border Service Department "Stepanivka"
- Border Service Department "Kuchurgan"
- Border Service Department "Lymanske"
- Border Service Department "Yasky"
- Border Service Department "Starokozache"
- Border Service Department "Krutoyarivka"
- Border Service Department "Faraonivka"
- Border Service Department "Olexandrivka"
- Border Service Department "Petrivka"
- Border Service Department "Vysochanske"
- Border Service Department "Pidigrne"
- Border Service Department "Maloyaroslavets"
- Mobile Border Outpost "Bilhorod-Dnistrovsky"
- Guardian units

Following checkpoints are under the detachment's operation

- Automobile crossings
  - "Kuchurgan"
  - "Mayaki"
  - "Udobne"
  - "Starokazache"
  - "Serpneve"
- Railway crossings
  - "Kuchurgan"
  - "Karabutseni"
- Aerial transport
  - "Lymanske Airport"
- Sea transport
  - "Bilhorod-Dnistrovsky Seaport"
- Interstate checkpoints
  - "Gradenytsia"
  - "Lisne"
  - "Maloyaroslavets"
  - "Rozalivka"
  - "Vysochanske"

== Commanders ==
- Colonel Mykola Mykolayovych Gursky (1992–1995)
- Colonel Shitmanyuk Volodymyr Vasyliovych (1995–1998)
- Colonel Yakiv Serhiyovych Galanyuk (1998–2001)
- Colonel Shchyr Viktor Dmytrovych (2001–2003)
- Colonel Petro Ivanovich Kramar (2003–2005)
- Colonel Yurii Petrovych Gresko (2005–2007)
- Colonel Oleksandr Kyrylovych Didyk (2007–2009)
- Colonel Sadovchuk Anatoly Oleksandrovych (2009–2011)
- Colonel Valchuk Andrii Mykolayovych (2011–2012)
- .Lieutenant Colonel Oleksandr Vasyliovych Meiko (2012–2014)
- Colonel Music Valery Petrovych (2014–2015)
- Colonel Moskalenko Serhii Anatoliyovych (2015–2018)
- Colonel Serhii Volodymyrovych Sharupych (2018–2020)
- Colonel Komisaruk Oleg Olegovich (2020–2022)
- Lieutenant Colonel Babich Yevhenii Yuriyovych (2022–2024)
- Colonel Serhiy Sokolovskyi (2024-)

== Sources ==
- Білгород-Дністровський прикордонний загін Державної прикордонної служби України
