= Horodnia Air Base =

Horodnia
- IATA: none; ICAO: UKRG

Summary
- Airport type: Military
- Operator: Soviet Air Forces
- Location: Horodnia, Chernihiv Oblast, Ukraine
- Elevation AMSL: 489 ft / 149 m
- Coordinates: 51°53′0″N 031°39′0″E
- Interactive map of Horodnia

Runways
Direction	Length		Surface
Direction	ft	m	Surface
	8,202	2,500	Concrete

Horodnia (also Gorodnya, Horodnya, Horodnye, or Gorodnye) was a flight training air base in Ukraine located 4 km east of Horodnia.

It was home to the 703rd Training Aviation Regiment flying 101 Aero L-39 Albatros, "C" model. The 703rd Training Aviation Regiment moved from Uman to Gorodnya in 1965; it formed part of the Chernigov Higher Military Aviation School of Pilots (17th Air Army/Air Forces of the Kyiv Military District). The regiment was taken over by Ukraine in early 1992.

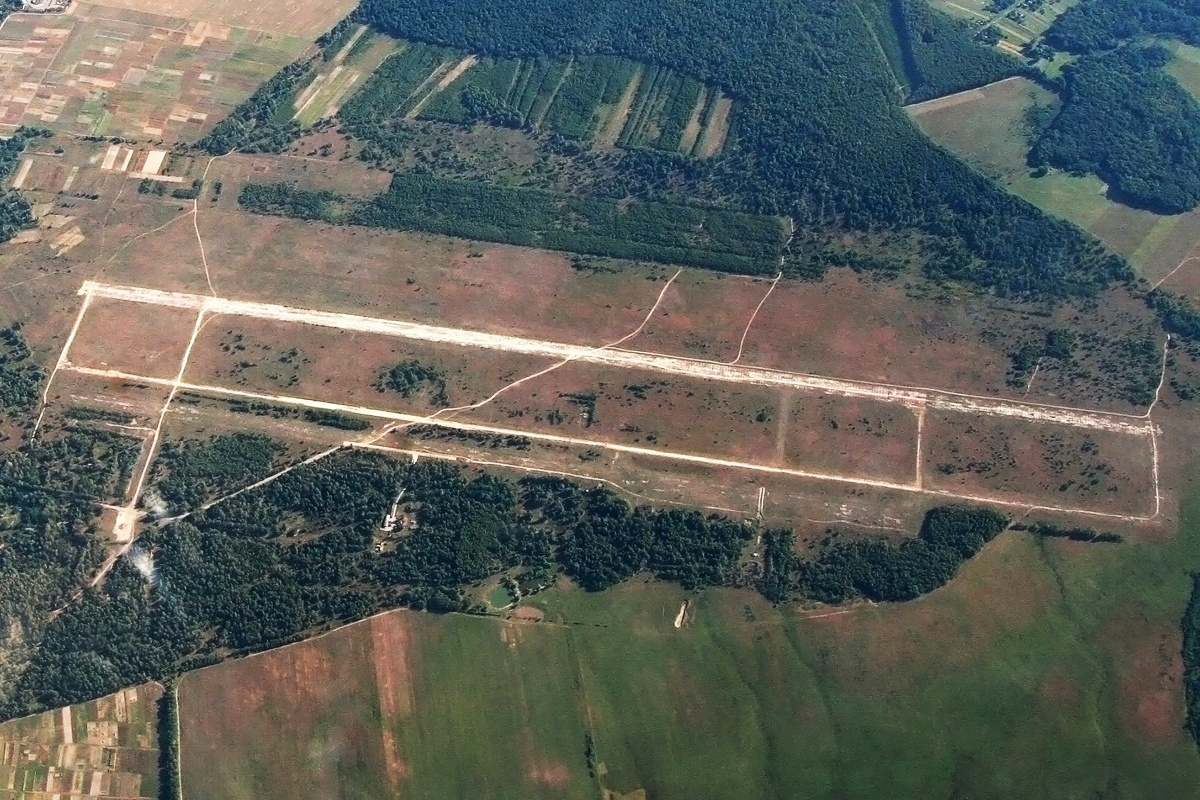
Gorodnya
