= Voznesensk (air base) =

Air base in Mykolaiv Oblast, Ukraine

Voznesensk/Martynovka
- Voznesensk, Mykolaiv Oblast in Ukraine

Site information
- Owner: Ministry of Defence
- Operator: Ukrainian Air Force

Location
- Shown within Mykolaiv Oblast Voznesensk (Ukraine)
- Coordinates: 47°30′35″N 031°15′28″E

Site history
- In use: Unknown - present

Airfield information
- Identifiers: ICAO: UKOW
- Elevation: 266 metres (873 ft) AMSL
Runways
Direction	Length and surface
13/31	2,470 metres (8,104 ft) Concrete

Voznesensk (Ukrainian: Вознесенськ) is a reserve air base of the Ukrainian Air Force located near Voznesensk, Mykolaiv Oblast, Ukraine.

== History ==
The 115th Guards Assault Aviation Division, the former 5th Guards, renamed by order of 10 January 1949, arrived at Voznesensk in May 1947 and was disbanded in August 1956.

In 1959 the 642nd Guards Fighter-Bomber Aviation Regiment arrived at the airfield from Podgorodnaya in Odesa Oblast. In 1988 the regiment became a Fighter Aviation Regiment equipped with the Mikoyan MiG-29 "Fulcrum."

By the time of the Fall of the Soviet Union the regiment was part of the 5th Air Army. In 1992 the personnel of the 642nd Guards Fighter Aviation Regiment took the Oath of Allegiance to the People of Ukraine.
