= Lymanske Airport =

Lymanske International Airport Міжнародний аеропорт «Лиманське»
- IATA: none; ICAO: UKOM

Summary
- Airport type: Public
- Serves: Lymanske
- Location: Odesa Oblast, Ukraine
- Elevation AMSL: 158 ft / 48 m
- Coordinates: 46°40′8″N 030°0′40″E

Map
- Location of Lymanske Airport in Ukraine

Runways
Direction	Length		Surface
Direction	ft	m	Surface
18/36	8,212	2,503	Concrete

Lymanske International Airport (Ukrainian: Міжнародний аеропорт «Лиманське») (ICAO: UKOM) is an airport in the Odesa Oblast, Ukraine. It is located 2.5 km east of the town of Lymanske. Originally built as a military airbase, it began service as a public airport in April 1998. It is guarded by the Bilhorod-Dnistrovskyi Border Detachment.

== History ==
The airport was originally built as a military airbase by the Soviet Armed Forces, however after the collapse of the Soviet Union many military airfields in Odesa Oblast were dismantled or fell into disrepair. Lymanske remained functionally operational due to efforts by approximately 200 former airfieeld employees who maintained the facility form looting and later became its tenants.

In the late 2000s, Ukrainian and Austrian investors, including representatives of Austrian Airlines, expressed interest in developing the airport for cargo and potential passenger operations especially for logistics regarding UEFA Euro 2012. However, the 2008 financial crisis slowed down negotiations. In 2006, the airport was leased to the municipal enterprise "Lymanske" until 2011, however in October 2008 the municipal enterprise transferred the lease to LLC "International Airport Lymanske". In 2014, the airport was ordered to pay 362,000 UAH in unpaid rent to the local raion council by the Commercial Court of Odesa Oblast, as they stated the enterprirse had not paid rent since February 2009.

Since 24 February, the airport does not operate any scheduled, charter or cargo flights following the Russian invasion of Ukraine.
