= Ihor Momot =

Ukrainian Major General (1965–2014)

Ihor Fedorovych Momot (Ukrainian: Ігор Федорович Момот; 18 August 1965 – 11 July 2014) was a Ukrainian colonel posthumously promoted to Major General who was killed in the Zelenopillia rocket attack, during the War in Donbas. On 29 April 2019, Ihor Momot was awarded the title of Hero of Ukraine, the highest state award of Ukraine.

== Biography ==
Ihor Momot was born on 18 August 1965 in Tiraspol. Following his father, he graduated from Sverdlovsk Higher Tank Artillery School. In 1986, he volunteered to fight in the Soviet–Afghan War. After the Ukrainian declaration of independence, Momot continued to serve in the State Border Service of Ukraine.

=== Death ===
Momot was killed in action on 11 July 2014 when his position was attacked while he was defending the Eastern Border of Ukraine.

== Memorials ==
A Ukrainian ship was named in his honor two years after his death. A judo tournament was held in his honor in 2021. A museum room inside a school was dedicated to him in 2015.
