= Zelenopillia rocket attack =

2014 Russian rocket attack against Ukraine

- Part of the war in Donbas
Date	11 July 2014
Location	Zelenopillia, Sverdlovsk Raion, Luhansk Oblast, Eastern Ukraine 47°56′24″N 39°38′33″E
Result	Russian victory

Belligerents
Ukraine	Russia

Commanders and leaders
(Ukraine) Col. Ihor Momot † (Head of State Border Service)	Unknown

Units involved
Ukrainian Ground Forces: 24th Mechanised Brigade; 72nd Mechanised Brigade; Airmobile Forces: 79th Airmobile Brigade; 1st Battalion; State Border Guard Service of Ukraine: Bilhorod-Dnistrovskyi Border Detachment	Russian Ground Forces

Strength
1 armoured group	122-mm 9K51M "Tornado-G" batteries 2 Orlan-10 drones

Casualties and losses
37 killed 100+ injured 2 battalions worth of vehicles and tanks lost	1 Orlan-10 drone shot down

The Zelenopillia rocket attack took place on 11 July 2014 during the war in Donbas. The rocket barrage, which was launched from inside Russian territory by Russian forces, killed 37 Ukrainian soldiers and border guards in a camp at Zelenopillia, Sverdlovsk Raion, Luhansk Oblast.

== Attack ==
In the early morning of 11 July 2014, Russian forces fired a barrage of 9K51M "Tornado-G" rockets in 40 salvos beginning at 4:40 a.m. They targeted an armoured convoy of the Ukrainian Ground Forces from a distance of 15 kilometres (9.3 mi). The Ukrainian column was camped in a field near the village of Zelenopillia, situated along the main highway to Luhansk in Sverdlovsk Raion near Rovenky. The town is located only 9 km (5.6 mi) from the Russia–Ukraine border. The Ukrainian armoured brigades were a part of a larger contingent of troops guarding the border against the illegal movement of military equipment from Russia into Eastern Ukraine.

At least 19 soldiers were killed and 93 others were injured in the rocket strike. Four Ural-4320 transport trucks full of troops were struck. According to one Ukrainian soldier's account, the 1st Battalion of Mykolaiv's 79th Airmobile Brigade was "almost completely destroyed" during the rocket onslaught. Chief physician of a regional hospital, Serhiy Ryzhenko, reported the wounded to be in grave condition, with some undergoing traumatic leg amputations and loss of limbs.

According to an investigation a year later, 30 Ukrainian soldiers and 7 border guards were killed and over 100 soldiers were wounded during that strike. Ukrainian border guards Colonel Ihor Momot was among the fallen. Materiel losses were equivalent to two battalions worth of equipment.

== Reactions ==
In response to the rocket strike, Ukrainian president Petro Poroshenko held an emergency cabinet meeting and issued a statement condemning the attack and vowing to "find and destroy" the pro-Russian rebels accountable. He also said for every Ukrainian serviceman's life the militants will pay with "tens and hundreds of their own".

The United States Department of the Treasury instituted a new set of sanctions on Russia after reliable evidence emerged that the rockets were fired from within Russian territory. Videos by a resident of the rocket launchers firing at Ukrainian positions matched the very same Google Maps view of the same physical features inside Russian territory bordering Ukraine.

== See also ==
- Outline of the Russo-Ukrainian War
- 2014 Russian cross-border shelling of Ukraine
- Novosvitlivka refugee convoy attack
- Volnovakha bus attack
- January 2015 Mariupol rocket attack
