= Southern Group of Forces =

Soviet Armed Forces formation

The Southern Group of Forces (YUGV) was a Soviet Armed Forces formation formed twice following the Second World War, most notably around the time of the Hungarian Revolution of 1956.

== First Formation ==
On June 15, 1945, the 26th and 37th Armies (from 3rd Ukrainian Front) in Romania and Bulgaria, plus a division which had reached Yugoslavia, were grouped into the Southern Group of Forces. It was commanded by Fyodor Tolbukhin. In 1946, the 37th Army became the 10th Mechanised Army. 57th Army, briefly to become 9th Mechanised Army, was also part of the Group. Colonel general Vyacheslav Tsvetayev commanded the group between January 1947 and its disbandment. After the signing of the Paris Peace Treaties in 1947, the SGF disbanded, along with HQ 26th Army, and passed on its functions to the 10th Mechanised Army, which had now been redesignated the Special Mechanized Army.

== Second Formation ==
The Group was re-created for a second time with its staff in Budapest seemingly during September 1955 (though former Soviet sources disagree; Feskov et al. say it was created on November 24, 1956). Lenskii says that it was re-created in 1955 to control the Soviet troops in Hungary following the disbandment of the former Central Group of Forces which had controlled troops in Austria and Hungary from 1945 to 1955, and the Soviet withdrawal from Austria. Under its command were the 2nd Guards 'Nikolayevsk-Budapest' Mechanised Division, the 17th Guards 'Yenakievskiy-Danube' Mechanised Division, two air divisions, and other troops. Lenskii says their function was 'to cover the boundary with neutral Austria and to guarantee communications in the case of the advancement of troops from the USSR'.

=== Hungarian Revolution ===
On October 24, 1956, the 33rd Guards Kherson Mechanized Division, previously stationed in Romania near the Romanian-Hungarian border, and two divisions from the Carpathian Military District, the 11th Guards 'Rovenskaya' Mechanized and 128th Guards Rifle Division, entered Hungary under the control of a Rifle Corps. The forces already in Hungary and those entering totalled 31,500 men. The 33rd Guards Mechanised Division took the lead role in suppressing the Hungarian Revolution in Budapest, and lost, according to Soviet sources, 14 tanks and assault guns as well as 9 armoured personnel carriers. Seven months afterward, on May 28, 1957, an agreement on the status of Soviet troops, comprising the Southern Group of Forces, was made between the USSR and Hungary.

The 11th Guards Mechanised and 128th Guards Rifle Divisions returned to the Carpathian Military District and were replaced by the 21st Guards 'Poltava' Tank Division and the 27th 'Cherkassy' Motor Rifle Division, both under the command of the Carpathian Military District's 38th Army. 2nd Guards Mechanised Division was re-formed into the 19th Guards Tank Division, and the 17th Guards Mechanised Division was re-formed into the 17th Guard Motor Rifle Division and withdrawn to the USSR. The 33rd Guards Mechanised Division was then replaced by the 35th Guards 'Kharkov' Mechanised Division.

=== 1957–1990 ===
Main locations of the Southern Group of Forces in 1989

Later, either in 1957 or 1965, three of the four divisions in the Group were redesignated, and toward the end of the 1980s the Group comprised:

- Southern Group of Forces, in Budapest
  - 13th Guards Tank Division, in Veszprém
  - 19th Guards Tank Division, in Esztergom
  - 93rd Guards Motor Rifle Division, in Kecskemét
  - 254th Motor Rifle Division, in Székesfehérvár
  - 22nd Missile Brigade, in Dombóvár
  - 55th Anti-Aircraft Missile Brigade, in Mór
  - 70th Radio Engineering Brigade, in Budapest
  - 127th Guards Brigade, in Budapest
  - 297th Anti-Aircraft Missile Brigade, in Dunaföldvár
  - 459th Missile Brigade, in Tata
  - 36th Air Army, in Budapest
    - 11th Guards Fighter Aviation Division, in Tököl

Smaller units included the 327th Anti-Aircraft Missile Regiment (327 ZRP), headquartered at Szolnok and tasked with airfield defence. In 1967, the 22nd Missile Brigade became part of the Southern Group of Forces at Dombóvár.

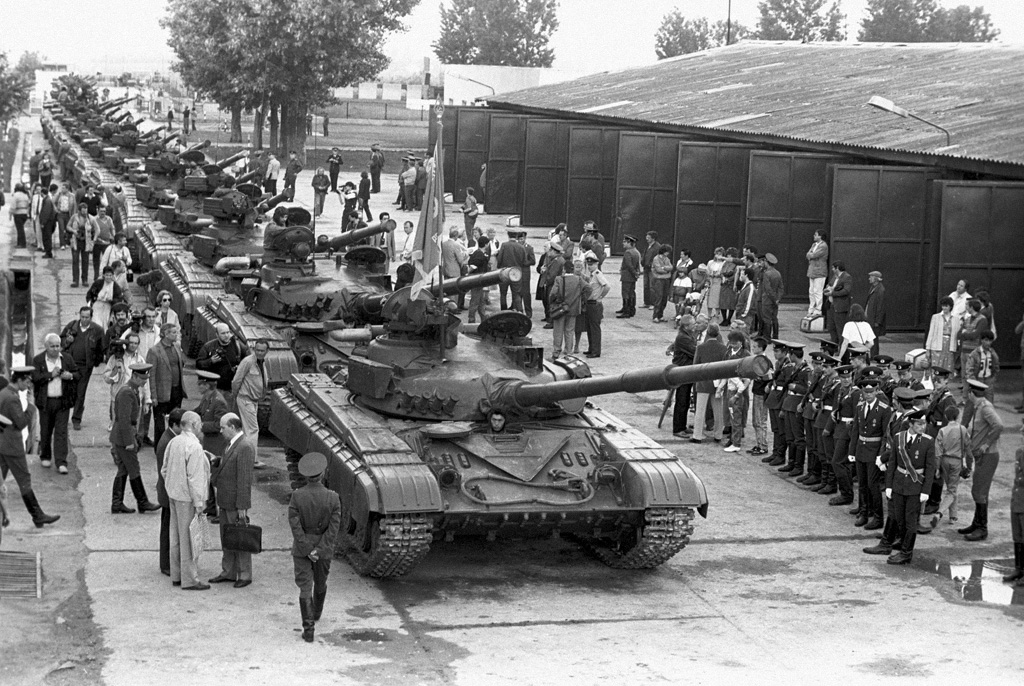
Soviet tanks leaving Hungary, 1990

The removal of Soviet troops from Hungary began during May 1989, with the withdrawal and disbandment of 13th Guards Tank Division. Later the 19th Guards Tank Division was withdrawn to the Belarusian Military District and the 254th Motor Rifle Division to the Kiev Military District. The 93rd Guards Motor Rifle Division was withdrawn in early 1991 to the Kiev Military District and the Group finally disbanded on 16 June 1991.

=== Commanders ===
- December 1956 – October 1960 - Army General Mikhail Kazakov
- October 1960 – August 1961 - Colonel General Matvei Nikitin
- August 1961 – September 1962 - Army General Pavel Batov
- September 1962 – October 1969 - Colonel General Konstantin Provalov
- October 1969 – December 1975 - Colonel General Boris Ivanov
- December 1975 – March 1979 - Colonel General Fedot Krivda
- March 1979 – August 1982 - Colonel General Vladimir Sivenok
- August 1982 – August 1985 - Colonel General Konstantin Kochetov
- August 1985 – June 1988 - Colonel General Alexey Demidov
- June 1988 – December 1990 - Colonel General Matvey Burlakov
- December 1990 – September 1992 - Lieutenant General Viktor Shilov

== Air Forces of the Southern Group of Forces ==
The following units were part of the Southern Group of Forces Air Forces, designated the 36th Air Army between 1967 and 1981.
- 11th Guards Fighter Aviation Division (11 Guards IAD) (Tököl)
  - 5th Guards Fighter Aviation Regiment (Sármellék)
  - 14th Guards Fighter Aviation Regiment (Kiskunlacháza)
  - 515th Fighter Aviation Regiment (Tököl)
- 1st Guards Fighter Bomber Aviation Regiment (Kunmadaras)
- 727th Guards Bomber Aviation Regiment (Debrecen)
- 328th Separate Guards Reconnaissance Aviation Regiment (Kunmadaras)
- 396th Separate Guards Helicopter Regiment (Kalocsa)
- 294th Separate Electronic Warfare Helicopter Squadron (Debrecen)
- 8th Separate Target-Towing Aviation Squadron (Sármellék, Kunmadaras, Debrecen)
- 201st Separate Mixed Aviation Squadron (Tököl)
- 37th Separate Helicopter Unit (Veszprém-Szentkirályszabadja)
- 38th Separate Helicopter Unit (Székesfehérvár)
- 72nd Separate Helicopter Unit (Kecskemét-Kadafalva)
- 74th Separate Helicopter Unit (Esztergom-Kertváros)
- 18th Separate Communications and Automated Control Regiment (Piliscsaba)

=== 11th Guards Fighter Aviation Division ===
The 11th Guards Fighter Aviation Division (11 GvIAD) moved from Parndorf in Austria to Veszprém in Hungary in November 1945.

The division was stationed at Veszprem until September 1949. It came under command of the 78th Guards Fighter Aviation Corps in January 1949. On 20 February 1949 it was renamed 195th Guards Dnepropetrovsk Red Banner Order of Bogdan Khmelnitsky Fighter Aviation Division. In 1950 the division comprised the 1st, 5th, and 106th Guards Fighter Aviation Regiments at Tokol and Papa flying MiG-15s. In 1956 it was involved in the Hungarian Revolution of 1956, and in 1968 in the Soviet invasion of Czechoslovakia. The 106th Guards Fighter Aviation Regiment was disbanded in mid-1961, and was replaced by the 14th 'Leningradskiy' Guards Fighter Aviation Regiment. The 1st Guards Fighter-Bomber Aviation Regiment became separate of the division, reporting directly to 36th Air Army, in mid 1963, and from July 1960 to 22 April 1991 with two short breaks was stationed at Kunmadaras.

The 195th Guards Fighter Aviation Dnepropetrovsk Red Banner Order of Bogdan Khmelnitsky Division was renamed by the Directive of the General Staff in April 1968 into the 11th Guards Fighter Aviation Dnepropetrovsk Red Banner Order of Bogdan Khmelnitsky Division.

Structure 1970:

- 5th Guards Fighter Aviation Regiment (Sármellék, Hungary) with Mikoyan-Gurevich MiG-21
- 14th Guards Fighter Aviation Regiment (Kiskunlacháza, Hungary) with MiG-21
- 515th Fighter Aviation Regiment (Tököl, Hungary) with MiG-21

The 14th GvIAP was based in 1981 at Kiskunlachaza air base in Hungary. The 14th acquired MiG-23Ms in 1975 and in 1979 also received MLs. The MiG-23s were replaced by MiG-29s in 1986. Elements of the regiment took part in the Warsaw Pact Exercise Zapad-81 in East Germany in late 1981.

The 515th Fighter Aviation Regiment was disbanded at Tokol in August 1989. The 5th Guards Fighter Aviation Regiment was disbanded in October 1990, with aircraft and crews being withdrawn to Biaroza, Brest Oblast, in the Byelorussian SSR.

Following these disbandments, the structure of the 36th Air Army on 1 January 1991 was:

- HQ 36th Air Army, Budapest (Southern Group of Forces)
- 18th Separate Communications Regiment (Piliscsaba)
- 201st OSAE (Tököl) with 10 Mi-8 and a few transport aircraft
- 1st Guards Fighter-Bomber Aviation Regiment (Kunmadaras) with MiG-27 and MiG-23
- 328th Guards ORAP (Kunmadaras) with 12 Su-24 and 15 Su-17 – withdrawn to Ukraine and disbanded, April 1991
- Separate Helicopter Squadron for Electronic Warfare
- 11th Guards "Dnepropetrovsk" IAD (Tököl)
  - 14th Guards "Leningrad" IAP (Kiskunlacháza) with 34 MiG-29 and 9 MiG-23

Two regiments of the 36th Air Army were returned to the Soviet Union in April 1991. On 21 April the 14th Guards Fighter Aviation Regiment moved back to Zherdevka, Tambov Oblast, in the Moscow Military District. The next day (22 April 1991) the 1st Guards Fighter-Bomber Aviation Regiment was transferred back to the Soviet Union, being moved back to Lebyazhye in Volgograd Oblast.

The 11th Guards Fighter Aviation Division was disbanded in June 1991.

== See also ==
- Soviet occupation of Romania
- Central Group of Forces
- Northern Group of Forces
- Western Group of Forces
