= Zhytomyr Oblast Council =

Legislature of Zhytomyr Oblast, Ukraine

Type
- Type: Unicameral
- Houses: 1

Leadership
- Speaker: Volodymyr Fedorenko

Structure
- Seats: 64
- Political groups: Government (33): Servant of the People (11); Independents (9); For the Future (7); Proposition (6); Opposition (24): European Solidarity (9); Fatherland (6); Radical Party (5); Strength and Honor (4); Vacant (7): Vacant (7)

Elections
- Last election: 25 October 2020

Meeting place
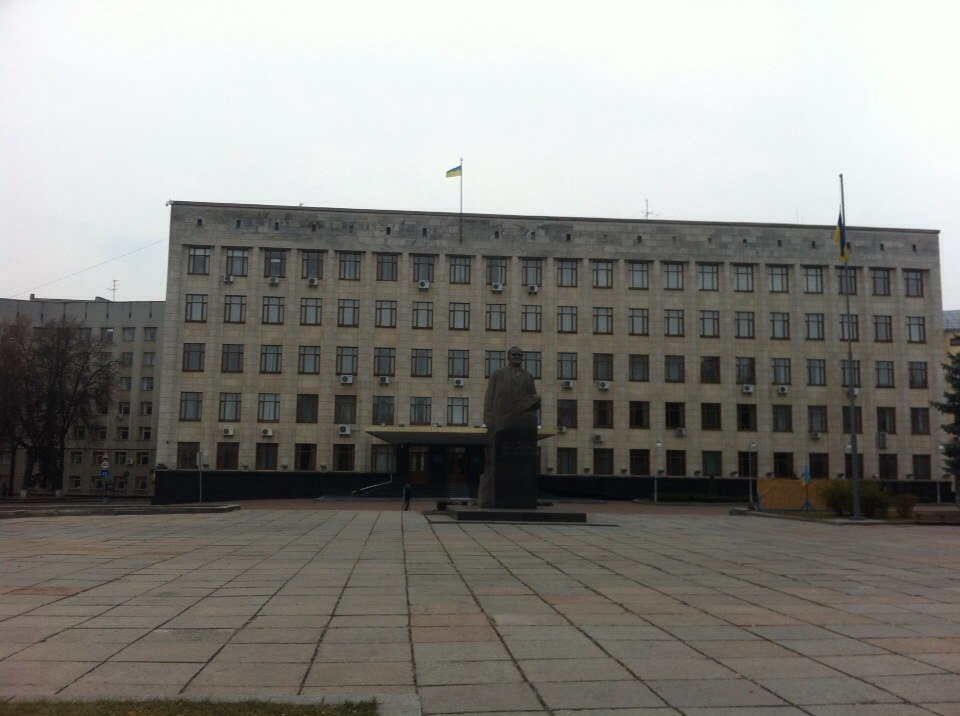
- Zhytomyr, Zhytomyr Oblast

Website
- https://zt.gov.ua/

The Zhytomyr Oblast Council (Ukrainian: Житомирська обласна рада) is the regional oblast council (parliament) of the Zhytomyr Oblast (province) located in northern Ukraine.

Council members are elected for five year terms. In order to gain representation in the council, a party more than 5 percent of the total vote.

As of August 2025, the ZOC of the VIII convocation consists of a coalition of 33 deputies from the parties "Servant of the People", "Our Land", "For the Future", and "Proposition". In opposition to them are 24 deputies from "European Solidarity", "Batkivshchyna", "Radical Party" and the party "Strength and Honor".

== Recent elections ==
=== 2020 ===
On 25 October 2020, following the 2020 Ukrainian local elections, the seats were distributed as follows:

- 11 Servant of the People
- 9 Our Land
- 9 European Solidarity
- 7 Opposition Platform — For Life
- 7 For the Future
- 6 Proposition
- 6 Fatherland
- 5 Radical Party
- 4 Strength and Honor

=== 2015 ===
On 25 October 2015, following the 2015 Ukrainian local elections, the seats were distributed as follows:

- 17 Solidarity
- 13 Fatherland
- 7 Opposition Bloc
- 6 Radical Party
- 6 Self Reliance
- 5 People's Party
- 5 UKROP
- 5 Freedom

== Chairmen ==
=== Regional Executive Committee ===
- 1937–1938 Aleksandr Faibishev
- 1938–1941 Vladimir Perov
- 1941–1944 Nazi Germany occupation
- 1944–1949 Nikolai Rozhanchuk
- 1949–1955 Zakhar Bogatyr
- 1955–1963 Viktor Kremenetsky
- 1963–1964 Aleksandr Botvinov (agrarian)
- 1963–1964 Viktor Kremenetsky (industrial)
- 1964–1965 Aleksandr Botvinov
- 1965–1982 Viktor Kremenetsky
- 1982–1990 Vasyl Yamchynsky
- 1990–1991 Anton Malynovsky
- 1991 Volodymyr Fedorov
- 1991–1992 Anton Malynovsky

=== Regional Council ===
- 1990–1991 Volodymyr Fedorov
- 1991–1992 Anton Malynovsky
- 1992–1994 Stanislav Rashevsky
- 1994–1998 Anton Malynovsky
- 1998–2006 Arkhyp Voitenko
- 2006–2008 Iryna Syniavska
- 2008–2010 Vitaliy Frantsuz
- 2010–2014 Yosyp Zapalovsky
- 2014–2015 Vitaliy Frantsuz
- 2015–2016 Anzhelika Labunska
- 2016–2020 Volodymyr Shyrma
- 2020– Volodymyr Fedorenko
