= Kiskunlacháza =

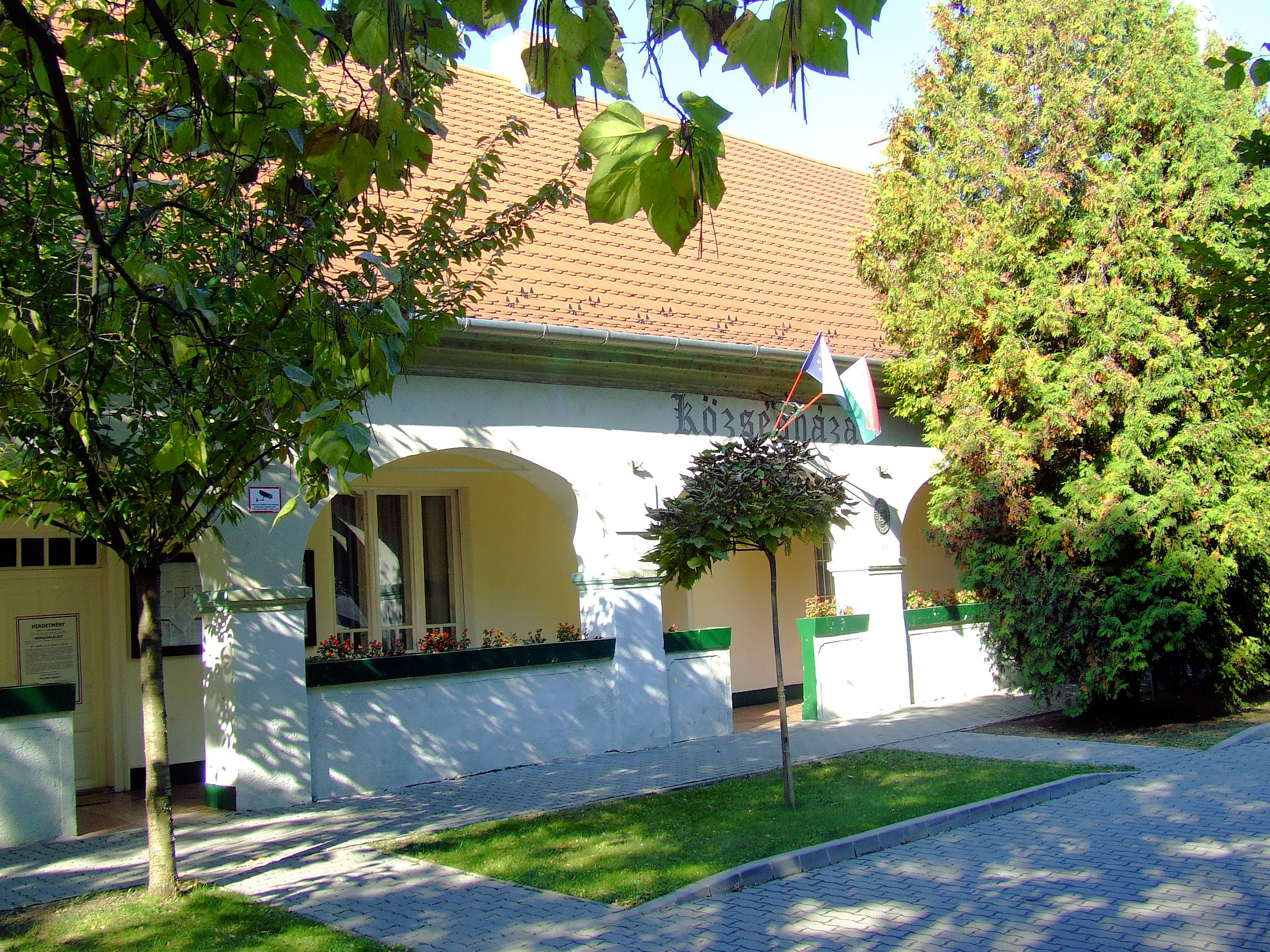
- The town hall of Kiskunlacháza.

- Coat of arms

- Location within Hungary
- Coordinates: 47°12′N 19°01′E
- Country: Hungary
- County: Pest

Government
  - Mayor: Répás József (Fidesz-KDNP)

Area
  - Total: 94.05 km^{2} (36.31 sq mi)

Population (2022)
  - Total: 9,129
  - Density: 97.07/km^{2} (251.4/sq mi)
- Time zone: UTC+1 (CET)
  - Summer (DST): UTC+2 (CEST)
- Postal code: 2340
- Area code: 24

Kiskunlacháza is a city in Pest county in the northern part of Central Hungary, approximately 4 miles from the Danube river and its largest neighbor, Ráckeve. It is divided between the larger Lacháza, a predominantly Protestant and wealthy village, and Pereg, a mostly Catholic and rural village; these two villages comprise its land and population.
