= Sármellék =

Sármellék Šamelik (in Croatian)
- Village
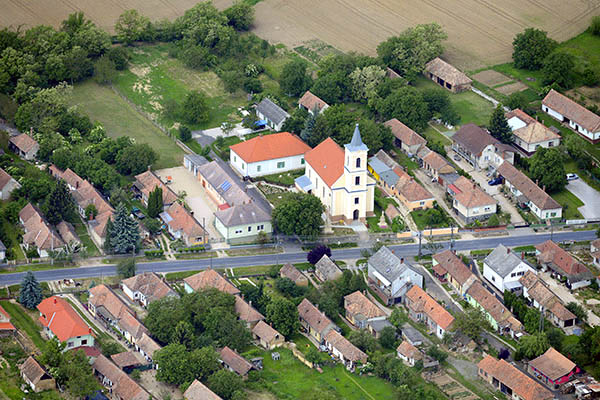

- Flag Coat of arms

- Location of Sármellék
- Coordinates: 46.71187°N 17.16931°E
- Country: Hungary
- Region: Western Transdanubia
- County: Zala
- District: Keszthely

Area
  - Total: 35.37 km^{2} (13.66 sq mi)

Population (1 January 2026)
  - Total: 1,769
  - Density: 50.01/km^{2} (129.5/sq mi)
- Time zone: UTC+1 (CET)
  - Summer (DST): UTC+2 (CEST)
- Postal code: 8391
- Area code: (+36) 83
- Website: sarmellek.hu

Sármellék is a village in Zala County, Hungary, notable for the Hévíz-Balaton Airport located nearby. Its passenger railway closed in 1976, so the only way to-and-from the village is by car.

== Gallery ==
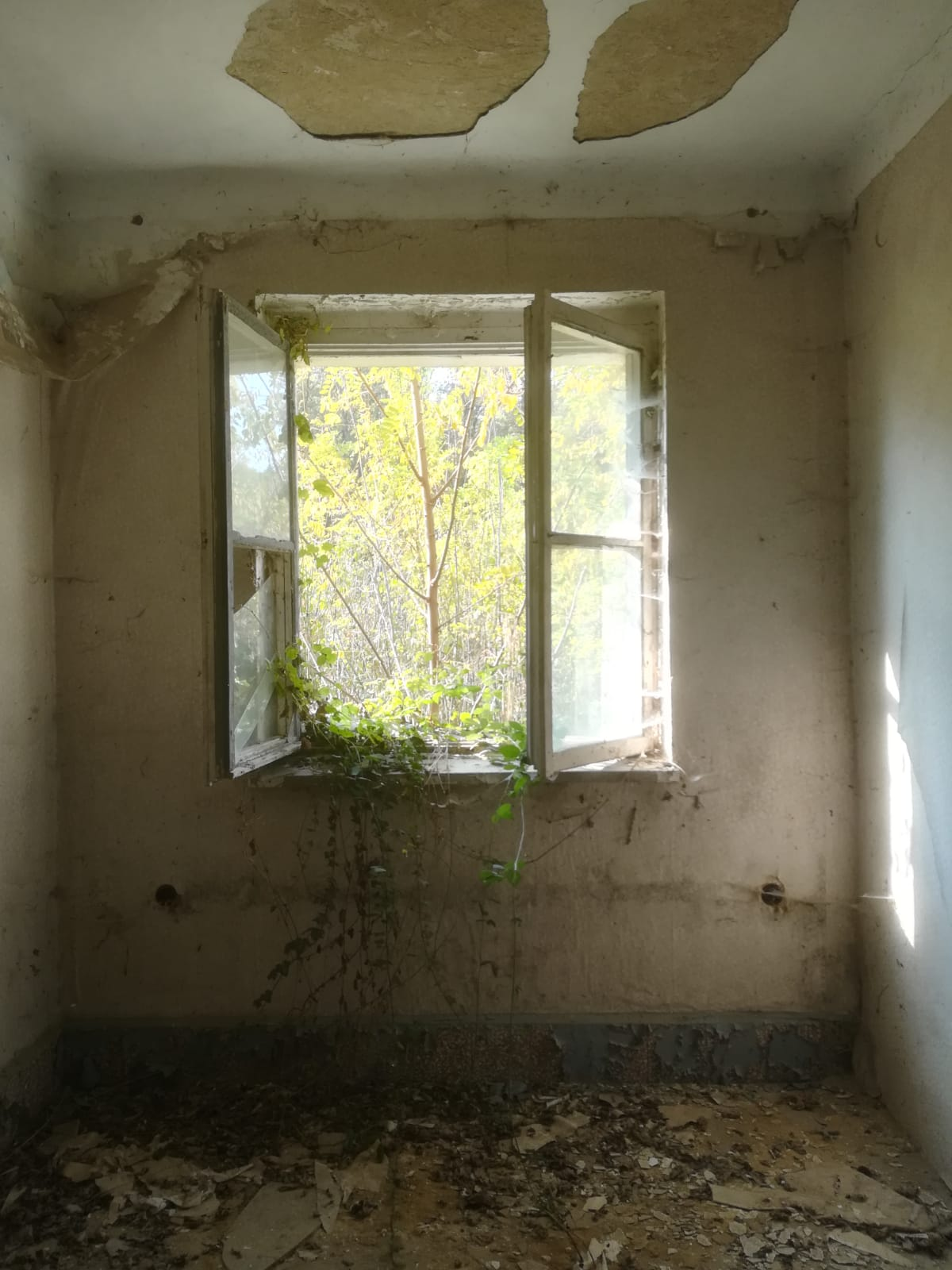
Ruins of the Russian army base in Sármellék

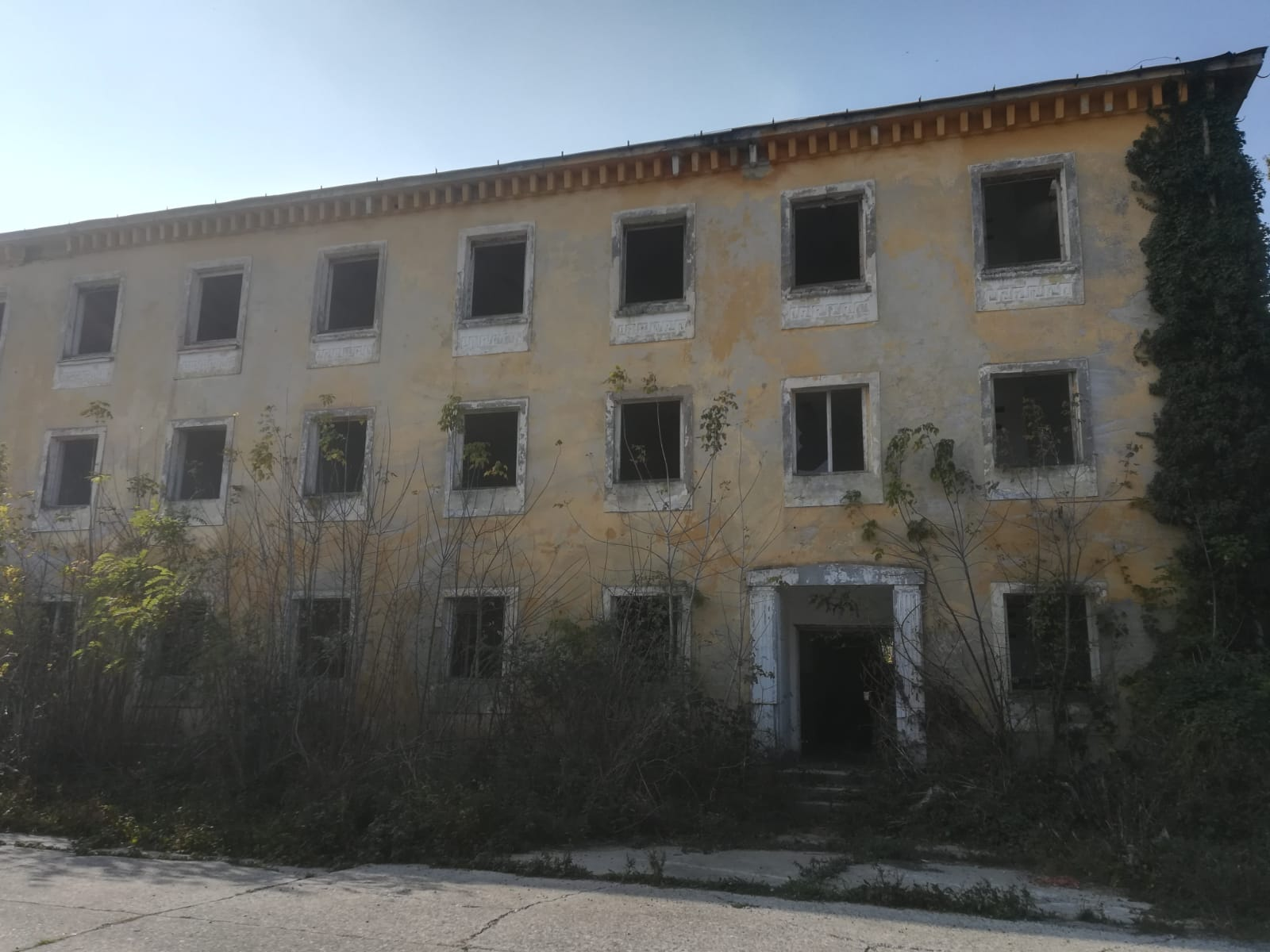
Ruins of the Russian army base in Sármellék

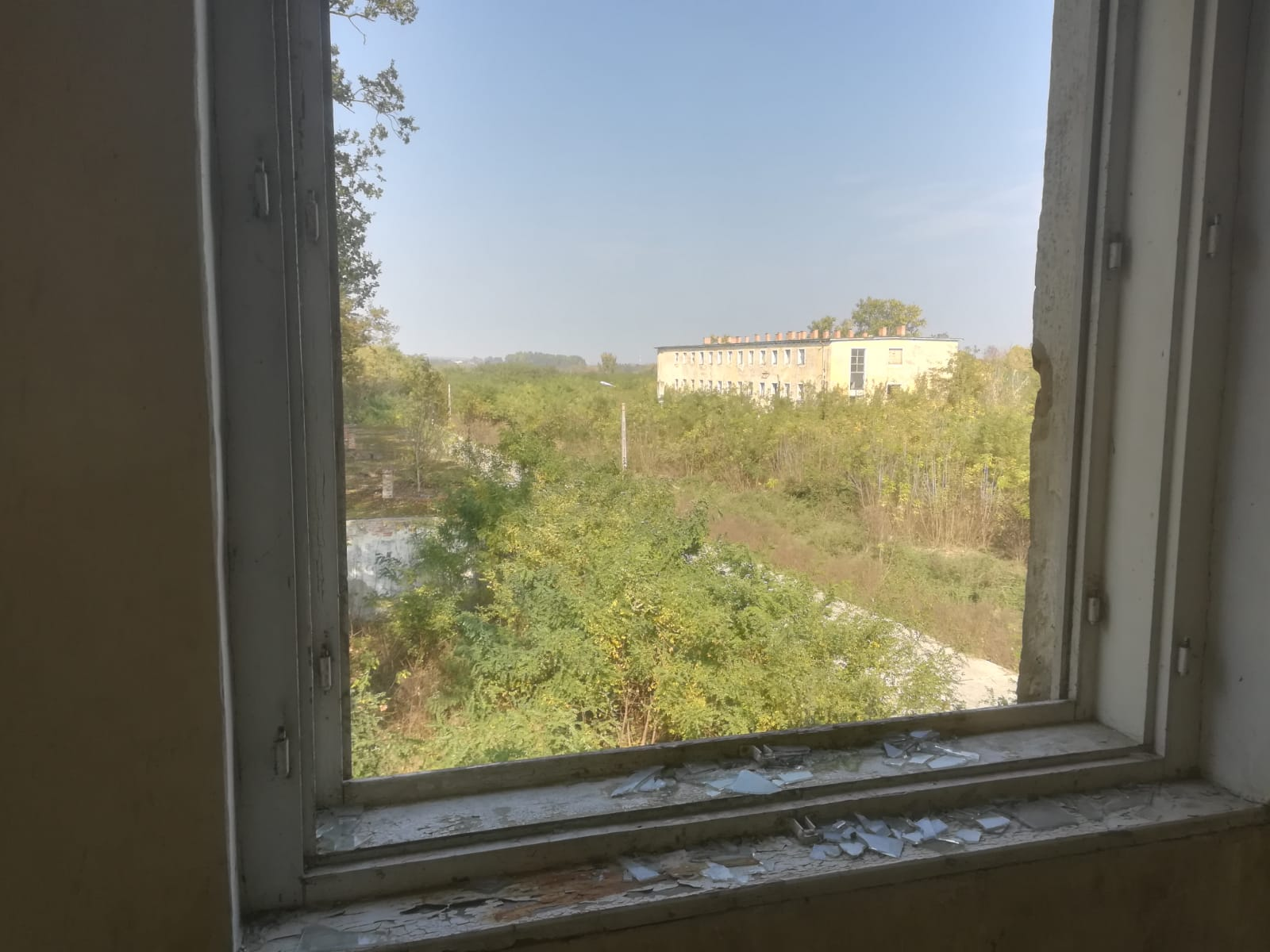
Ruins of the Russian army base in Sármellék
