= 17th Air Army =

The 17th Air Army (Russian: 17-я воздушная армия) was an Air army of the Red Air Force and Soviet Air Forces from 1942.

== Second World War ==
It was formed in November 1942 on the basis of the Air Forces of the Southwestern Front. It included 1st Mixed Air Corps (incl 267 Assault Aviation Division (ShAD), 288 FAD), two fighter (282 FAD, and 288 FAD in 1 MAC), one bomber (221 BAD), and the 262nd Night Bomber Aviation Division. Regiments and squadrons included 208 and 267 AARs; 282 Mixed Aviation Regiment; 371 Long-Range Bomber Aviation Regiment; 10th Reconnaissance Aviation Squadron; and 34th and 35th корректировочная авиационная эскадрилья (Corrective Aviation Squadrons, CASs).

It immediately took part in the Battle of Stalingrad. On 19 November 1942 during the battle of Stalingrad it was under the command of general-mayor Stepan Krasovsky.

On 1 April 1943, as part of the Southwestern Front, it comprised the

- 3rd Mixed Aviation Corps (207th Fighter Aviation Division, 290th Assault Aviation Division),
- 7th Mixed Aviation Corps (202nd Bomber Aviation Division, 235th Fighter Aviation Division),
- 9th Mixed Aviation Corps (305th, 306th Assault Aviation Division, 295th Fighter Aviation Division),
- 244th Bombardment Aviation Division,
- 262nd Night Bomber Aviation Division,
- 39th, 132nd Bomber Aviation Regiments,
- 208th, 637th Attack Aviation Regiments,
- 282nd Mixed Aviation Regiment,
- 371st Transport Aviation Regiment,
- 10th, 50th Reconnaissance Aviation Squadrons,
- 34th Fire Correction Squadron.

From August 1943 to May 1944 it included the 1st Guards Mixed Aviation Corps and the 11th Guards Fighter Aviation Division.

From March 1943 until the end of the war Vladimir Sudets commanded the 17th Air Army. From 1943 to 1945 it participated in the Ostrogozhsk–Rossosh Offensive, Left and Right Bank Ukraine operations, and the capture of Romania, Bulgaria, Yugoslavia, Hungary, and Austria. Over 200,000 sorties were flown.

== Post War ==
On 1 May 1945 the army consisted of

- the 1614th, 1615th, 1654th, 1676th, 1975th Anti-Aircraft Artillery Regiments
- the 10th Assault Aviation Corps (136th and 306th Assault Aviation Divisions),
- 244th Bomber Aviation Division,
- 189th Assault Aviation Division,
- the 194th, 288th and 295th Fighter Aviation Divisions,
- 262nd Night Bomber Aviation Division,
- 39th Separate Reconnaissance Aviation Regiment,
- 96th Separate Artillery Correction Regiment,
- 227th Transport Aviation Regiment,
- 3rd Medical Evacuation Aviation Regiment,
- 282nd Aviation Communications Regiment.

In June 1945 3rd Guards Fighter Aviation Corps arrived in Romania to join the Army.

By 1 July 1945 the Air Army had joined the Southern Group of Forces.

Between 1945 and 1947 the 17th Air Army was the aviation component of the Soviet occupation forces in Romania, the Southern Group of Forces, and had its headquarters in Bucharest. Afterwards it returned to the Kiev Military District and established its headquarters in Kyiv.

The 39th Reconnaissance Aviation Regiment was transferred to Samarkand and the 6th Air Army in 1947.

Air Force Colonel General Sergey Goryunov was commander of 17th Air Army between 1946 and 1949.

In February 1949 it was redesignated the 69th Air Army.
In April 1964 the 69th Air Army became the Air Forces of the Kiev Military District.
In April 1968 the Air Forces of the Kiev Military District became the 69th Air Army once more.
In April 1972 the 69th Air Army was redesignated the 17th Air Army.
In June 1980 the 17th Air Army became the Air Forces of the Kiev Military District.
In May 1988 the Air Forces of the Kiev Military District became the 17th Air Army.

In 1992 the air army became part of the Armed Forces of Ukraine; by 1996 it appears to have been dissolved.

== Order of battle 1970 ==
Organisation 1970:

- 138th Fighter Aviation Division (Mirgorod, Mirgorod Oblast)
- 255th Separate Mixed Aviation Squadron (Borispol, Kiev Oblast)
- 135th Separate Communications Regiment (Kiev, Kiev Oblast)
- Chernigov Higher Military Aviation School of Pilots (ChVVAUL) (Chernigov, Chernigov Oblast)
- Kharkov Higher Military Aviation School of Pilots (KhVVAUL) (Kharkov-Chuguev, Kharkov Oblast)
- Voroshilovgrad Higher Military Aviation School of Navigators (VVVAUSh) (Voroshilovgrad (Lugansk), Voroshilovgrad Oblast)

April 1972 renamed 17th Air Army.

The 138th Fighter Aviation Division joined the 24th Air Army VGK in 1980.

== Order of battle late 1980s ==
The 24th Air Army of the High Command (Operational Purpose) (24-я ВА ВГК ОН) was based in the area of responsibility of the Kiev Military District. During peacetime it was subordinated directly to the Air Force High Command and in wartime it would transfer to the High Command of the South-Western Strategic Direction and deploy to airbases in Bulgaria and Romania and attack targets in Greece and Italy.

The 24th AA took part in training exercises with the forces of the Kiev MD, which allowed for the military district's own 17th Air Army to become mostly a training formation with control over three air force officer schools and kept as a force-in-being, to convert its training air regiments into combat units during wartime.

In the late 1980s its headquarters was at Kiev. By 1989 the air army had the following structure:

Directly subordinated to 17th Air Army HQ:

- 135th Separate Signals and Automatized Command and Control Regiment (Kiev (city))
- 255th Separate Composite Aviation Squadron (Borispol military part of Boryspil International Airport): transport aircraft - Tu-154, Tu-134, AN-26, An-24, Mi-22, 2 Mil Mi-6, 7 Mil Mi-8
- 228th Separate Electronic Warfare Helicopter Squadron (Borispol, military part of Boryspil IAP): 15 Mi-8PPA/SMV
- 190th Fighter Aviation Regiment (Kanatovo), flying MiG-23 (disbanded in 1989)
- 452nd Separate Ground Attack Aviation Regiment (Blyznetsy, Kharkiv Oblast): Su-25/UB (planned to relocate to Aleksandriia once the 51st Separate Guards Transport and Combat Helicopter Regiment (an army aviation regiment of the Kiev MD) based there disbanded. This never happened and the helicopter regiment became a separate helicopter brigade of the UNG in 1992)
- 94th Separate Squadron of UAV Reconnaissance Assets (Kharkiv), flying Tu-141 (disbanded in 1989, some sources claim the unit existed until the autumn of 1996)
- 161st Separate Squadron of UAV Reconnaissance Assets (Honcharivske), flying Tu-141 (disbanded in 1990)
- ? Separate Squadron of UAV Reconnaissance Assets (Dnepropetrovsk), flying Tu-141 (disbanded in 1990)

Lugansk Higher Military Aviation School of Navigators (Луганское ВВАУШ/Lugansk VVAUSh)

- 46th Training Aviation Regiment (Voroshilovgrad (Lugansk), Voroshilovgrad Oblast) with An-26
- 130th Training Aviation Regiment (Mariupol, Donetsk Oblast) with An-12BK
- 228th Training Aviation Regiment (Bagerovo, Krymskaya Oblast): 36 MiG-21; 20 L-29

Kharkhov Higher Military Aviation School of Pilots (Харьковское ВВАУЛ/Kharkov VVAUL)

- 443rd Training Aviation Regiment (Velikaya Krucha, Poltava Oblast): 101 L-39
- 809th Training Aviation Regiment (Akhtyrka, Sumy Oblast); 102 L-39
- 810th Training Aviation Regiment (Chuguev, Kharkov Oblast): 103 MiG-21
- 812th Aviation Regiment (Kupyansk (Kurlovka), Kharkov Oblast): 102 MiG-21 (or L-39 ?)

Chernigov Higher Military Aviation School of Pilots (Черниговское ВВАУЛ/Chernigov VVAUL)

- 105th Training Aviation Regiment (Konotop (air base)): 101 L-39
- 701st Training Aviation Regiment (Chernigov air base): MiG-29, L-39
- 702nd Training Aviation Regiment (Uman): MiG-21
- 703rd Training Aviation Regiment (Gorodnya/Городня): 101 L-39

The Chernigov School was disbanded 30.11.1995.

Aircraft numbers are sourced from Vad777. Information is from Michael Holm and Feskov et al.
