= 1st Guards Assault Aviation Corps =

1st Guards Assault Aviation Corps (1944–49) 1st Assault Aviation Corps (1942–44)
- Active: 1942–49
- Country: Soviet Union
- Branch: Soviet Air Force
- Type: Aviation corps
- Engagements: World War II: Battle for Velikiye Luki; Demyansk Pocket; Belgorod-Khar'kov Offensive Operation; Battle of the Korsun–Cherkassy Pocket; Dnieper-Carpathian Offensive; Lvov–Sandomierz Offensive; Vistula-Oder Offensive; Lower Silesian Offensive; Upper Silesian Offensive; Battle of Berlin; Prague Offensive
- Decorations: Order of the Red Banner Order of Suvorov Order of Kutuzov
- Battle honours: Kirovograd; Berlin; Кировоградско-Берлинский Краснознамённый орденов Суворова и Кутузова

Commanders
- Notable commanders: Vasily Ryazanov

The 1st Guards Kirovograd–Berlin Red Banner Order of Suvorov and Order of Kutuzov Assault Aviation Corps (1st GvShAK) was a military formation of the Soviet Air Forces during World War II and the early postwar period. Formed from elite units of the Red Air Force, the corps played a significant role in ground-attack operations on the Eastern Front, primarily operating the Ilyushin Il-2 Sturmovik close-support aircraft.

In 1949, the unit was reorganized and renamed the 60th Guards Assault Aviation Corps, continuing its service until its disbandment in 1956.

== Designations ==
- 1st Assault Aviation Corps
- 1st Kirovograd Assault Aviation Corps (1942–44)
- 1st Guards Kirovograd Assault Aviation Corps
- 1st Guards Kirovograd-Berlin Red Banner Orders of Suvorov and Kutuzov Assault Aviation Corps (1944–49)
- 60th Guards Assault Aviation Corps (1949–56)

== Formation ==
The 1st Assault Aviation Corps was formed by an NKO Order dated September 10, 1942, from the 2nd Fighter Aviation Army. Part of the order establishing the corps said:

- 1. Establish and keep in the Reserve of the Supreme High Command:
- b) 1st Assault Aviation Corps as part: Office of the Air shtat No. 015/281, 121st Communications Battalion Shtat 015/215, 292nd, 290th and 266th Assault Aviation Divisions, each composed of three assault and one fighter aviation regiments with 32 aircraft each.
- 1st Assault Aviation Corps stationed in Yurkino district, Dmitrov.
- 3. Three squadrons are part of each of the fighter and assault aviation regiments, consisting of two flights with four aircraft and two aircraft for the squadron commander and commissar. The regimental headquarters have two aircraft for the use of the regimental commander and commissar.
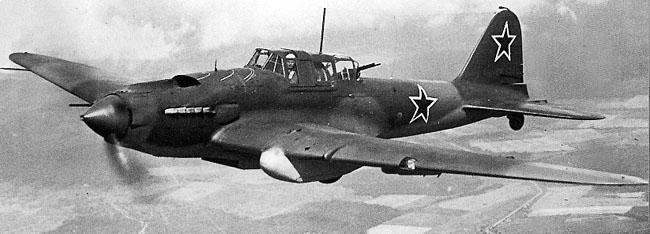
- An Ilyushin Il-2 of the type flown by the corps

4. 1st and 2nd Fighter and the 1st Bomber Air Army - disband. Personnel and equipment used to staff the [new] air corps.

- 5. Air Corps to be included as part of the army ....
- 11. Assign the following to the corps: as the commander of the 1st Assault Aviation Corps, Major General of Aviation Vasily Georgyevich Ryazanov, as the commander of the 290th Assault Aviation Division Lieutenant Colonel P.I. Mironenko, as the commander of the 263rd Bomber Aviation Division Colonel F.I. Dobysh, as the commander of the 266th Assault Aviation Division Lieutenant Colonel F.G. Radyakina

== World War II ==
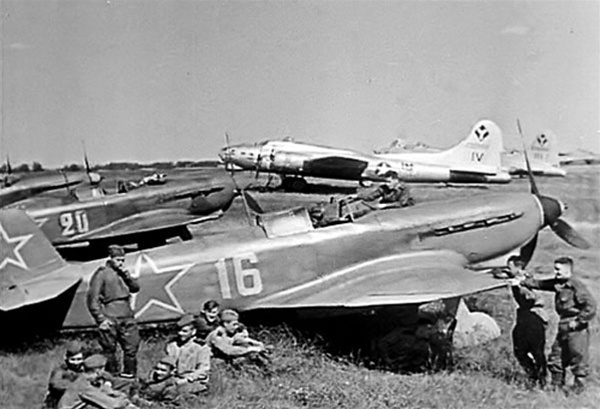
Aircraft of the corps. Can be dated to the period of the U.S. Operation Frantic by the Boeing B-17 Flying Fortress in the background.

In the Battle of Kursk (Operation Citadel), General Vasily Ryazanov became a master in the use of attack aircraft en masse, developing and improving the tactics of Il-2 operations in co-ordination with infantry, artillery and armored troops. Il-2s at Kursk used the "circle of death" tactic: up to eight Sturmoviks formed a defensive circle, each plane protecting the one ahead with its forward machine guns, while individual Il-2s took turns leaving the circle, attacking a target, and rejoining the circle. Ryazanov was later awarded the Gold Star of Hero of Soviet Union twice, and the 1st Assault Aircraft Corps under his command became the first unit to be awarded the honorific title of Guards. In 1943, one loss corresponded to 26 Sturmovik sorties. About half of those lost were shot down by fighters, the rest falling to anti-aircraft fire.

== Part of the 'Operational Army' ==
The 1st Assault Aviation Corps was part of the 'operational army' ((ru:Действующая армия и флот, in combat) from October 17, 1942 to February 5, 1944, a period of 477 days. The corps was still part of the 'operational army' after its elevation to Guards status and remained in combat until 11 May 1945. The corps thus spent 937 days in combat.
