= Bereza =

Bereza may refer to:

- Bereza, Lublin Voivodeship, Poland
- Bereza, Sumy Oblast, Ukraine
- Bereza-Osovcy, an air base in Brest Oblast, Belarus
- FC Bereza-2010, a football club, Belarus
- Bereza (surname)
- Bereza (Desna), a tributary of the Desna in Ukraine
- Bereza (Mezha), a tributary of Mezha in Russia
- A transliteration without diacritics of the Russian word "Берёза", see Beryoza (disambiguation)

== See also ==
- Bereza Kartuska, Polish name of Belarusian town Byaroza
