= Syalyets Selsoviet, Brest region =

Territorial subdivision of Byaroza District, Brest Region, Belarus

Syalyets rural council (Belarusian: Сялецкі сельсавет; Russian: Селецкий сельсовет) is a lower-level subdivision (selsoviet) of Byaroza District, Brest Region, Belarus. Its administrative center is the agrotown of Syalyets.

It includes the following populated places:

- Vorozhbity (village)
- Zubachi (village)
- Kurovshchina (village)
- Mikhnovichi (village)
- Narutovichi (village)
- Onitsevichi (village)
- Oseka (village)
- Osovtsy (village)
- Panasovichi (village)
- Plyakhovshchina (village)
- Rogachi (village)
- Syalyets (agrotown)
- Soshitsa (village)
- Utrany (village)
- Yasevichi (village)
