= 911th Fighter-Bomber Aviation Regiment =

911th Fighter-Bomber Aviation Regiment (1960–1993) 911th Fighter Aviation Regiment (1942–1960)
- Active: 1942–1993
- Country: Soviet Union; Belarus
- Branch: Soviet Air Force; Belarusian Air Force
- Type: Aviation Regiment
- Garrison/HQ: Baranovichi
- Engagements: World War II: Soviet invasion of Manchuria

Commanders
- Notable commanders: Alexey Yeryomin

Aircraft flown
- MiG-15 MiG-17 MiG-27

The 911th Fighter-Bomber Aviation Regiment (911th IBAP/APIB since 1976) was an aviation regiment of the Soviet Air Force and later the Belarusian Air Force. It was formed in 1942 in the Soviet Far East as a fighter regiment and fought in the Soviet invasion of Manchuria. After the end of the latter it was stationed in Sakhalin and then the Chukotka Peninsula until 1953, when it moved to Belarus, where it remained for most of the Cold War. In 1960 it was converted into a fighter-bomber aviation regiment. In 1989 it was transferred to East Germany, but withdrawn to Belarus in 1992, where it disbanded in 1993.

== History ==
=== World War II ===
The 911th Fighter Aviation Regiment (IAP) was formed between 25 July and 17 August 1942 at Matveyevka-2, an airfield near Matveyevka, Khabarovsk Krai, part of the 29th Fighter Aviation Division of the 10th Air Army. It was commanded by future Hero of the Soviet Union Major Alexey Yeryomin until December. The 911th was equipped with obsolete Polikarpov I-16 fighters and on 24 November transferred to the 83rd Fighter Aviation Division. On 1 March 1943 the 911th transferred back to the 29th Fighter Aviation Division. Two weeks later, it was relocated to Pereyaslavka airfield, where it was rearmed with Polikarpov I-153 biplanes. On 13 April 1944 the regiment finally received modern Lavochkin La-5 fighters. In January 1945, Major Konstantin Kotelnikov took command of the regiment, which he led until December. On 23 May, the regiment was reequipped with the improved Lavochkin La-7.

On 8 August, just before the Soviet invasion of Manchuria on the next day, the regiment had 57 La-7s and two La-5s. During the invasion of Manchuria, which ended on 3 September, the 911th flew 80 sorties, broken down as follows: four against Japanese troops, 38 to provide air cover to advancing Soviet troops, four against Japanese airfields, and 34 reconnaissance sorties. The regiment did not participate in air combat, and destroyed a Japanese aircraft and a train car on the ground, but lost one aircraft to an operational accident.

=== Postwar ===
In 1947, the 911th was relocated to Bolshaya Elan in Sakhalin and a year later received Lavochkin La-11 long-range escort fighters. In July 1949 the regiment was transferred to Uelkal in the Chukotka Peninsula, becoming part of the 95th Mixed Aviation Division there. At Uelkal it assumed the mission of escorting Tupolev Tu-4 strategic bombers. In May 1950, before the beginning of the Korean War, pilot Captain V.S. Yefremov, flying out of Toyohara airfield in an La-11, reported intercepting and shooting down an American F-51 Mustang that he reported had been violating Soviet airspace. In 1952 the regiment relocated to Anadyr but in December 1953 moved to the other side of the Soviet Union at Zasimovichi airfield, near Pruzhany, Belarus, along with the division, which became a fighter unit. At this time the 911th began to convert to the Mikoyan-Gurevich MiG-15, its first jet fighter. From 1957 to early 1959 it was commanded by Korean War flying ace Vladimir Zabelin. In 1960, the regiment became a fighter-bomber aviation regiment, was relocated to Lida, and was transferred to the 1st Guards Fighter-Bomber Aviation Division. In 1961 the unit converted to the Mikoyan-Gurevich MiG-17. During 1975 and 1976 the unit replaced its MiG-17s with Mikoyan-Gurevich MiG-21S aircraft from the 684th Guards Fighter Aviation Regiment. Between 1981 and 1982 the regiment replaced the MiG-21s with Mikoyan-Gurevich MiG-23BNs from the 236th Fighter-Bomber Aviation Regiment and simultaneously received Mikoyan MiG-27s and MiG-27Ks.

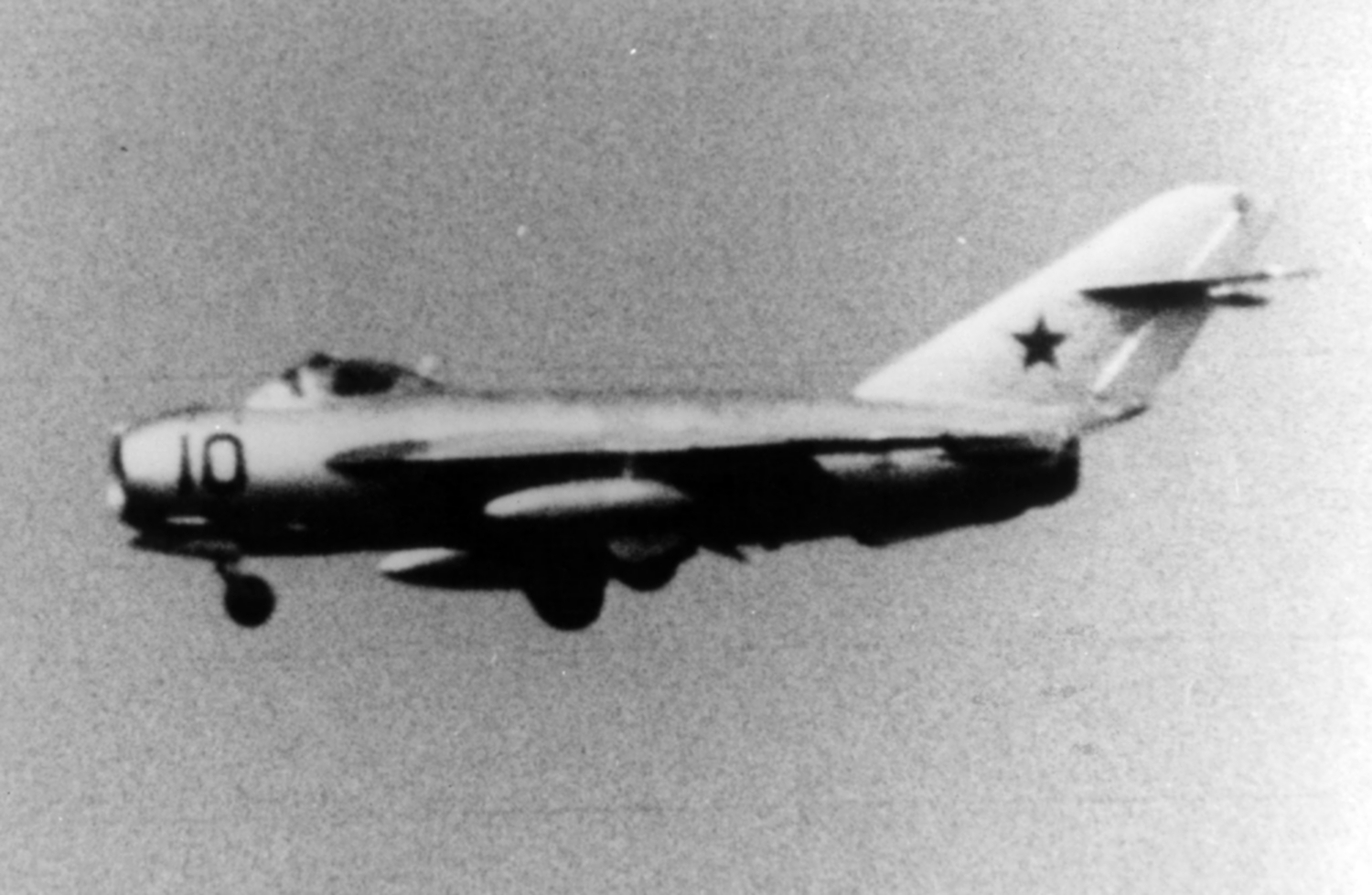
A MiG-17 of the type flown by the 911th for 15 years

In June 1989, the 911th Regiment was transferred to Brand airfield in East Germany (now the Tropical Islands Resort theme park), and became part of the 105th Fighter-Bomber Aviation Division. In November 1990, according to data exchanged by the Treaty on Conventional Armed Forces in Europe, the regiment included 32 MiG-27s and 10 MiG-23UMs. As Soviet troops withdrew from Germany, the regiment was briefly transferred to Finsterwalde on 22 June 1992, but returned to Lida on 6 July. At Lida, it became part of the 26th Air Army of the Belarusian Air Force and on 12 August was finally transferred to Baranovichi. The 911th Fighter-Bomber Regiment was disbanded in 1993, and its aircraft scrapped.

== Aircraft operated ==
Aircraft operated by 911th IAP (911th IBAP from 1960, APIB from 1976), data from
From	To	Aircraft	Version
July 1942	March 1943	Polikarpov I-16	
March 1943	April 1944	Polikarpov I-153	
April 1944	1945	Lavochkin La-5	
May 1945	1948	Lavochkin La-7	
1948	1954	Lavochkin La-11	
late 1953	1961	Mikoyan-Gurevich MiG-15	
1961	1976	Mikoyan-Gurevich MiG-17	
1975	1982	Mikoyan-Gurevich MiG-21	MiG-21S
1981	1993	Mikoyan-Gurevich MiG-23	MiG-23BN, MiG-23UM
1981	1993	Mikoyan MiG-27	MiG-27K
