= 95th Fighter Aviation Division =

95th Mixed Aviation Division (1949–1954) 95th Fighter Aviation Division (1954–1988)
- Active: 1949–1988
- Country: Soviet Union
- Branch: Soviet Air Forces
- Type: Aviation division
- Garrison/HQ: Shchuchyn

The 95th Fighter Aviation Division (95th IAD) was a fighter aviation division of the Soviet Air Forces. The division was originally formed in 1949 as the 95th Mixed Aviation Division and became a fighter aviation division in 1954. It was disbanded in 1988 and was based in Shchuchyn from 1960.

== History ==
The 95th Mixed Aviation Division was formed in July 1949 in Markovo, part of the 29th Air Army. It was composed of the 214th Guards Transport Aviation Regiment and the 911th Fighter Aviation Regiment. In December 1953, the division was transferred west to Byaroza and became a fighter aviation division in 1954. It was subordinated to the 26th Air Army. In 1955, it included the 911th, 940th and the 968th Fighter Aviation Regiments. Between 1957 and 1959, future cosmonaut Dmitri Zaikin served as a chief pilot in the division.

The division relocated to Shchuchyn in 1960. Its 911th and 940th Fighter Aviation Regiments were transferred and replaced by the 927th (ru:927-й истребительный авиационный полк) at Bereza and 979th Fighter Aviation Regiments. In April 1980, the division became part of the Belorussian Military District VVS after the 26th Air Army was renamed. Elements of the 927th and 979th Fighter Aviation Regiments fought in the Soviet-Afghan War. The division was disbanded in June 1988.

The 927th Fighter Aviation Regiment became part of the Belarus Air Force after the collapse of the Soviet Union.
