= Bereza (surname) =

Bereza (Ukrainian: Береза, Russian: Берёза) is a Ukrainian and Russian-language surname which literally means "birch tree". Notable people with this surname include:

- Boryslav Bereza (born 1974), Ukrainian politician
- Myron Bereza (1936–2012), Ukrainian-Canadian soccer player
- Yuriy Bereza (born 1970), Ukrainian politician

== See also ==
- Beryoza (disambiguation)
- Byaroza, Belarusian-language version
