= Aleś Razanaŭ =

Belarusian writer, translator and poet (1947–2021)

- Алесь Разанаў
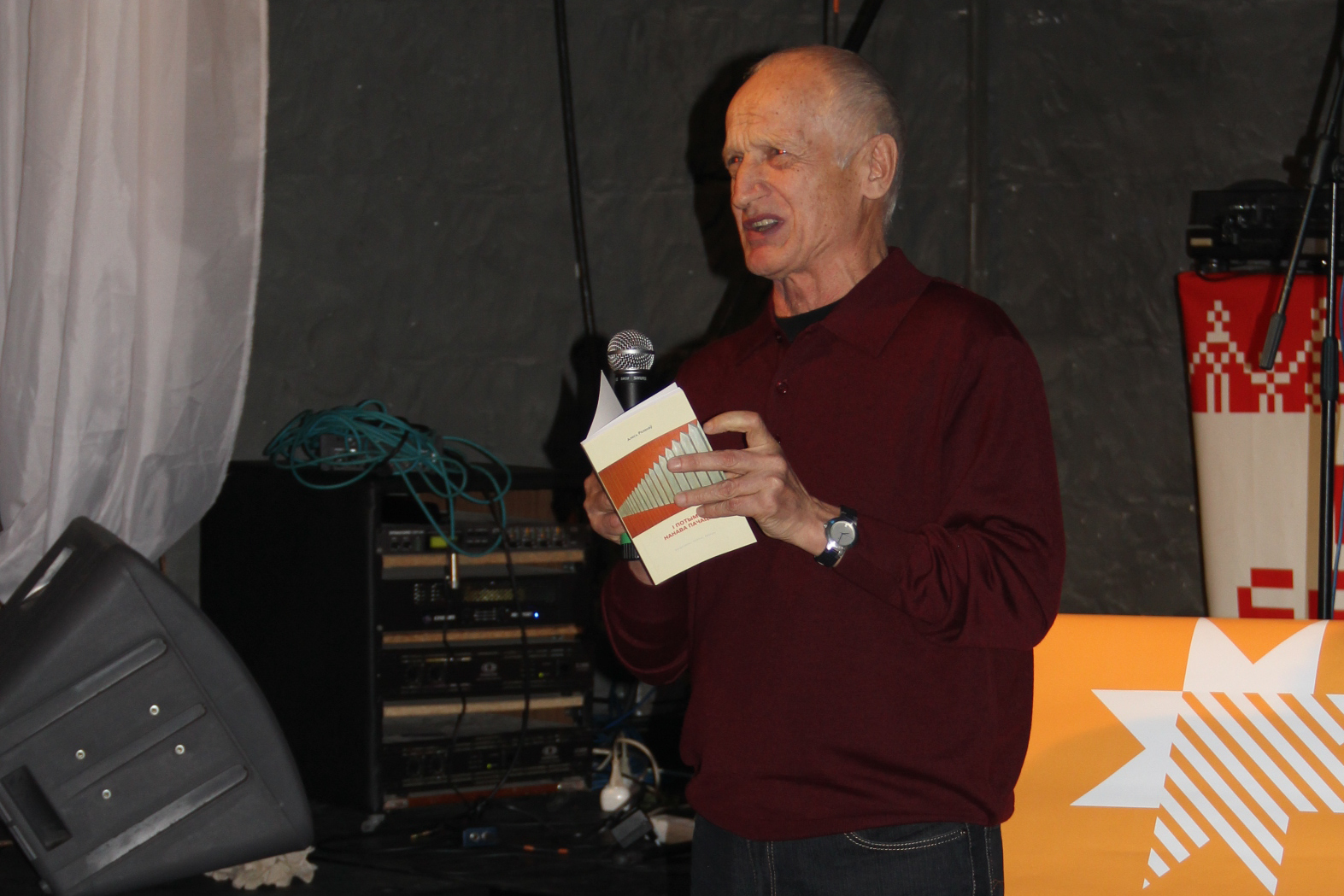
- Born: 5 December 1947; Syalyets, Byaroza District, Brest Oblast, Byelorussian SSR, USSR
- Died: 26 August 2021 (aged 73); Minsk, Belarus
- Occupations: writer, poet and translator
- Organization: Belarusian P.E.N. Centre

Aleś Razanaŭ (Belarusian: Алесь Разанаў; 5 December 1947 – 26 August 2021) was a Belarusian writer, poet and translator.

== Life ==
Aleś Razanaŭ was born in 1947 in Sialec (Biaroza district, Belarusian SSR), one of the oldest settlements in Belarus. His father, Stepan Ryazanov, was Russian, and he was from Tambov Oblast. He had come to Belarus before the Second World War as a participant in a geodetic expedition and had settled there.

His father had also written poems as a former concentration camp prisoner in Sachsenhausen and Mauthausen concentration camp. Razanaŭ began writing poems at an early age. When he was in the 6th grade (around 13 y.o.), his poems were printed in the district magazine "Biarozka" (Belarusian: Бярозка,"Little Birch Tree").

In the secondary school, Razanaŭ often attended the meetings of the literary association of the magazine "Biarozka". He also attended the meetings of the literary association at the district newspaper "Zaria" in Brest. When he was in the 9th grade, he attended a young writers workshop in Karalishchavichy. In January 1966, the newspaper "Literature and Art" published a collection of poems by Razanaŭ. He graduated from school in 1966. He then passed the entrance examination for the Philological Faculty of the Belarusian State University in Minsk. His essay, written in poetry, was later published in the university newspaper.

In addition to his studies, he worked in a Minsk Radiator Plant as a foundryman. In his spare time he was an active member of both the literary circle and the circle concerned about the general socio-political situation in Belarus. In October 1968, BSU philology students, led by Ales Razanaŭ, Viktar Yarac and Leu Bartash, sent a letter to the Central Committee of the Communist Party of Belarus addressed to Piotr Masherau (the letter was signed by several hundred students) demanding the return of teaching in Belarusian. As a result, the three initiators of the appeal were branded as "nationalists". And when Ales Razanaŭ, Viktar Yarac and Valyantsina Koutun visited Zelva to see Larysa Hienijuš, the first two were expelled from the Belarusian State University in the winter of 1969 (allegedly, due to failure to pass the military training test; before that they were excellent students). Thanks to the support of Siarhei Husak, Rector of the Maksim Tank Belarusian State Pedagogical University and Uladzimer Kaliesnik, Head of the Belarusian Language and Literature Department of this university, Ales Razanaŭ continued his studies at the Faculty of Philology of the Brest Pedagogical Institute, graduating in 1970. After graduating there in 1970, Razanaŭ worked as a teacher of Belarusian language and literature at the middle school in the village of Kruhel of Kamianeс district.

In 1971–1972 he did his military service in Valdai.

In 1970 Razanaŭ published his first book entitled Renaissance (Belarusian: Адраджэнне). Although many poems that had been published earlier did not appear in this collection, and others were ruthlessly censored, the book received a wide public response.

The publication of this book gave Razanaŭ the opportunity to become a member of the Belarusian section of the Writers' Union of the USSR in 1972, returning to Minsk, to the creative community in the capital. He got a job at the newspaper “Litaratura i Mastactva” ("Literature and Art"). However, his reputation as a nationalist did not keep him long with the then only intellectual Belarusian newspaper. He moved to the newspaper “Rodnaya Pryroda“ ("Native Nature").

From then on he worked as a translator, translating works from Bulgarian, Slovenian, Macedonian, Serbo-Croatian, German, Polish, Czech, Latvian and many other languages.

From 1974 to 1990 Razanaŭ worked for the editorial department of the literary criticism of the publishing house "Schöngeistige Literatur". From 1989 he was elected vice-president of the Belarusian P.E.N. Centre.

In the 1990s he became head of the Belarusian Roerich Foundation and in 1992 a research assistant at the national Franсysk Skaryna Centre. From 1994 he was Deputy Editor-in-Chief of the magazine "Krynica" ("Source"), which he had founded with like-minded people. He left this position in 1999 due to political pressure and increasingly accepted invitations from abroad, from Germany, Austria, Finland, Sweden and Slovenia. In 2001, for example, he lived in Hanover at the invitation of the International Writers' Parliament (IPW), which had joined the cities network for threatened and censored writers ("International Cities of Refuge Network") in 2000, and was the first to receive the Hannah Arendt One-Year Scholarship established for this purpose.

In 2003 he lived in Graz as a scholarship holder of this network, in 2007, as in 2001, he was a guest at the International Literature Festival Berlin and a Fellow in the DAAD Artists-in-Berlin Program.

== Later life and death ==
In his last years he lived mostly in Germany. He also wrote and published many of his short poems in German. He died in Minsk in August 2021, at the age of 73.

== Work ==
Ales Razanaŭ was one of the world's best-known Belarusian poets of the second half of the 20th century and the beginning of the 21st century. He was considered a master of landscape poetry with deep philosophical and psychological content, a classic of free verse and one of the founders of Belarusian haiku. Despite his independent way of thinking and writing independently, the poet's career developed quite smoothly. He was known in Belarusian literature as the author of new poetic forms.

He has translated from many languages, including the comedy Сон у Іванаву ноч ("A Midsummer Night's Dream") and two other comedies by William Shakespeare (1989), from Lithuanian the novel Час, калі пусцеюць сядзібы ("Time of the Desolate Courtyards") by Jonas Avyžius (1989) and poems selected from Latvian by Uldis Bērziņš (2013). Razanaŭ translated into Belarusian the haiku (then called hokku) poetry of Matsuo Bashō. On the centenary of Janka Kupala's birthday in 1982, he published the book of poems Выйду з сэрцам, як з паходняй!.. ("I will go out with my heart as a blazing torch!").

His works have been translated into English by the American writer Justin Rawley of North Carolina.

== Works ==
- 1970: Адраджэньне ("Renaissance") (initial title — «Адрачэньне» (“Renunciation”)
- 1974: Назаўжды ("Forever")
- 1976: Каардынаты быцьця ("Coordinates of Existence")
- 1981: Шлях — 360 ("The Way – 360“)
- 1988: Вастрыё стралы ("Tip of the Arrow")
- 1992: У горадзе валадарыць Рагвалод ("Ragvalod rules in the city")
- 1994: Паляванне ў райскай даліне ("Paradise Valley Hunt")
- 1995: Zeichen vertikaler Zeit. Poems, versettes, punctuations, reflections. (= Erato-Druck. 28). Agora, Berlin 1995, ISBN 3-87008-124-4. (Translator: Elke Erb).
- 1996: Страшният съд (The Judgement Day. Versettes). Версети, преведени от беларуски от Здравко Кисьов. На български език. Издателска къща Сребърен лъв, София, 1996. ISBN 954-571-063-6 (In Bulgarian. Translator: Zdravko Kissiov).
- 2000: Гліна. Камень. Жалеза ("Clay. Stone. Iron.")
- 2002: Tanz mit den Schlangen. Selection of poems. (= Erato-Druck. 31). Agora, Berlin 2002, ISBN 3-87008-132-5. (Translators: Elke Erb and Uladsimir Tschapeha).
- 2002: Hannoversche Punktierungen. Nachdichtung: Oskar Ansull. Revonnah-Verlag, Hannover 2002, ISBN 3-934818-51-X.
- 2003: Wortdichte. Steirische Verlags-Gesellschaft, Graz 2003, ISBN 3-85489-100-8.
- 2005: Кніга ўзнаўленняў ("The Book of Restoration")
- 2005: Лясная дарога: версэты ("Forest Trail")
- 2006: Каб мелі шчасце ўваскрасаць і лётаць: паэмы ("If we were lucky enough to rise and fly: poems")
- 2006: «Der Zweig zeigt dem Baum wohin er wachsen soll: gedichte» (The branch shows the tree where it should grow. Poems.) With an epilogue by Ilma Rakusa. (= Erato-Druck. 33). Agora, Berlin 2006, ISBN 3-87008-137-6.
- 2007: Дождж: возера ў акупунктуры: пункціры ("Rain: The Lake in Acupuncture")
- 2007: Das dritte Auge. Punctuations. Engeler, Basel/Weil am Rhein 2007, ISBN 978-3-938767-41-2. (Translator: Elke Erb).
- 2009: Пчала пачала паломнічаць: вершаказы ("The bee started a pilgrimage")
- 2009: Сума немагчымасцяў: зномы ("Sadness of Impossibility")
- 2010: Воплескі даланёю адною: пункціры ("One-handed applause")
- 2010: З апокрыфа ў канон: гутаркі, выступленні, нататкі ("From Apocryph to Canon: Conversations, Speeches, Articles")
- 2011: З: Вяліміра Хлебнікава ("3: by Velimir Hlebnikov")
- 2011: І потым нанава пачаць: квантэмы, злёсы, вершы ("And then start anew")
- 2011: «Der Mond denkt, die Sonne sinnt: wortdichte» (The moon thinks, the sun ponders. Word density.) Lohvinau, Minsk 2011, ISBN 978-985-6991-30-4. (Месяц думае, сонца разважае).
- 2013: «Падарунак хроснай маці»
- 2015: «На гэтай зямлі = Auf dieser Erde: версэты» (“On this land”)
- 2016: «Галасы тое, што ёсць, шукаюць: пункціры»
- 2016: From near and far. New word density. Vilnius and Minsk,.
- 2017: «Францыск Скарына. Маем найбольшае самі: кніга перастварэнняў Алеся Разанава»
- 2018: «Такая і гэтакі: талакуе з маланкай дождж: пункціры»
- 2020: «Маланка жне, гром малоціць: вершаказы»

== Recognition ==
- 1990: Janka Kupala Literature Prize (Літаратурная прэмія імя Янкі Купалы) for the book Вастрыё стралы (Tip of the Arrow)
- 2003: Herder Prize of the Alfred Toepfer Foundation F.V.S.
- 2012: Залаты апостраф (Golden Apostrophe)
- 2017: Natallia Arsiennieva Poetry Prize (Прэмія імя Натальлі Арсеньневай) for the book Перавыбранае (Selected Once Again)
