= 26th Air Army =

The 26th Air Army was an Air army of the Soviet Air Forces active from 1949 to 1980, and then 1988-1992.

It was formed by redesignation of the 1st Air Army in February 1949 (in accordance with a decree of 10 January 1949, ГШ ВС СССР No. ОРГ 120026), and controlled frontal aviation units stationed in the Belorussian Military District until the dissolution of the Soviet Union. Under newly independent Belarus, the army headquarters was used to form that of the Belarusian Air Force in 1992. The units of the army were divided between the Belarusian Air Force and the Russian Air Force in 1991–1993.

== History ==
After the end of World War II, the 1st Air Army was withdrawn to Belarus. The army was renumbered in January 1949 as the 26th Air Army to avoid duplication of numbers.

In 1952 two new Fighter Aviation Divisions arrived within the 26th Army, the 175th from East Germany and the 229th from Poland.

In 1953 the 175th Fighter Aviation Division was transferred to the 30th Air Army in the Baltic States, and was replaced by the 95th Fighter Aviation Division, arriving from the 29th Air Army in the Far East.

The 120th Fighter Aviation Regiment began forming as part of the Soviet military buildup in response to tensions with China on 24 September 1969. Initially based at the Osovtsy airfield in Berezovsky district of Brest Oblast, Belarus, the regiment initially formed part of the 26th Air Army. The 1st Aviation Squadron was formed from pilots of the 927th and 968th Fighter Aviation Regiments of the 26th Air Army, while the 2nd and 3rd Aviation Squadrons were formed from pilots transferred from other Air Force units and recent graduates of flying schools. Under the command of Lieutenant Colonel Solomon Zeltser, it was equipped with the Mikoyan-Gurevich MiG-21S. Following the completion of its formation in late 1970, the 120th IAP was relocated to Domna in the Transbaikal Military District in July 1971 in order to strengthen Soviet air forces on the border with China, its pilots making the flight in their aircraft.

In 1980, the 26th Air Army was redesignated the Air Forces of the Belorussian Military District (ГШ ВС СССР 1980 года No. 314/1/00170).

On 1 May 1988, in accordance with the Ministry of Defence of the USSR's Decree № 0018, the Air Forces of the District were again renamed the 26th Air Army.

The 95th Fighter Aviation Division was disbanded in mid-1988.

On 1 July 1989, the 979th Fighter Aviation Regiment at Schuchin (air base), Grodno Oblast was disbanded.

In 1990 the army included:

- 1st Guards Bomber Aviation Division (Lida, Grodno Oblast)
- 50th independent Composite Aviation Regiment (Minsk, Minsk Oblast)
- 151st independent Aviation Regiment for Electronic Warfare (Schuchin, Grodno Oblast)
- 927th Fighter Aviation Regiment (Bereza-Osovcy, Brest Oblast)
- 206th independent Assault Aviation Regiment (Pruzhany, Brest Oblast)
- 378th independent Assault Aviation Regiment (Postavy, Vitebsk Oblast)
- 397th independent Assault Aviation Regiment (Kobrin, Brest Oblast)
- 10th independent Reconnaissance Aviation Regiment (Schuchin, Grodno Oblast)
- 302nd independent Helicopter Squadron for Electronic Warfare (Kobrin, Brest Oblast)
- 56th independent Communications Regiment and Automated Control Regiment (Minsk, Minsk Oblast)

The army came under Belorussian control in mid 1992. On 15 June 1992, by decree № 05 of the Ministry of Defence of the Republic of Belarus, the 26th Air Army headquarters became the command of the Air Forces of the Republic of Belarus.
