= Syalyets, Byaroza district =

Agrotown in Brest Region, Belarus

Syalyets Сялец (Belarusian)
- Agrotown
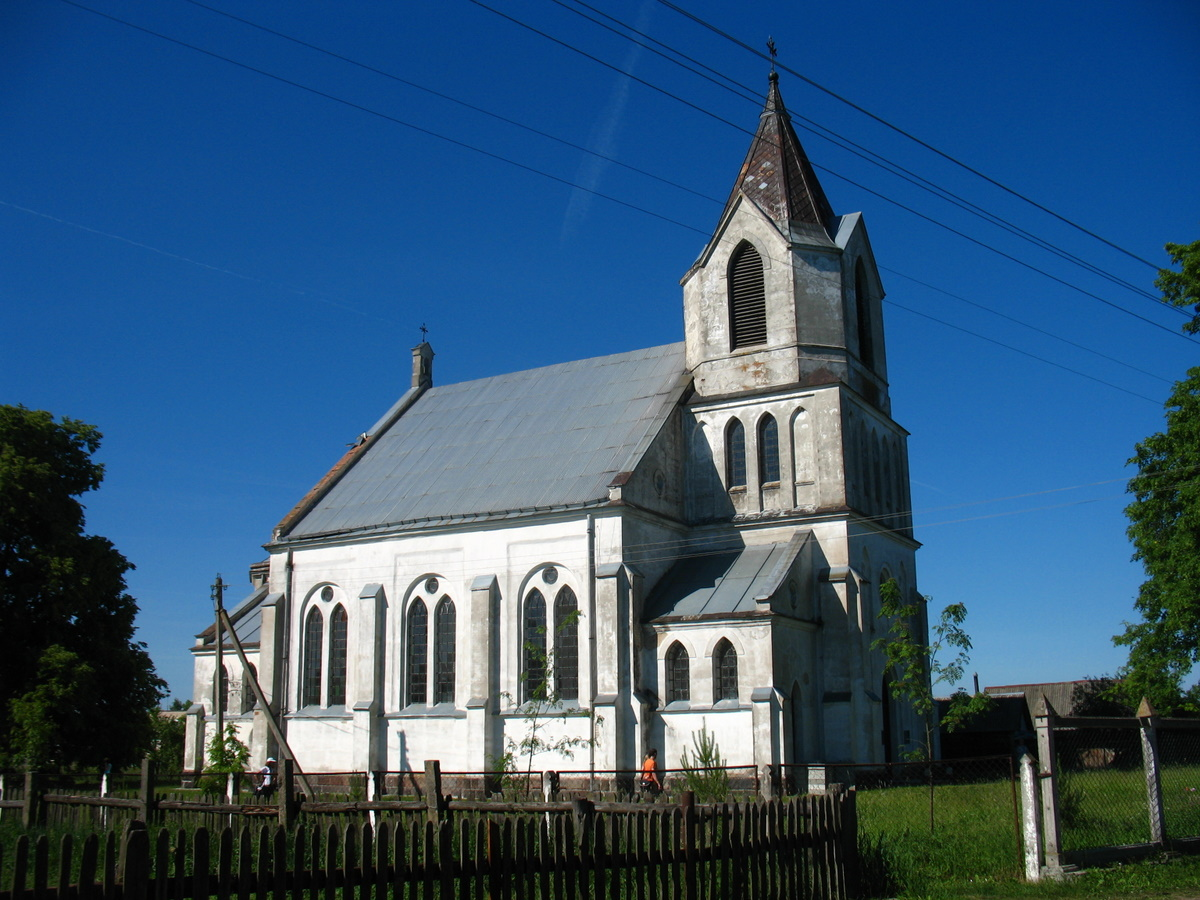

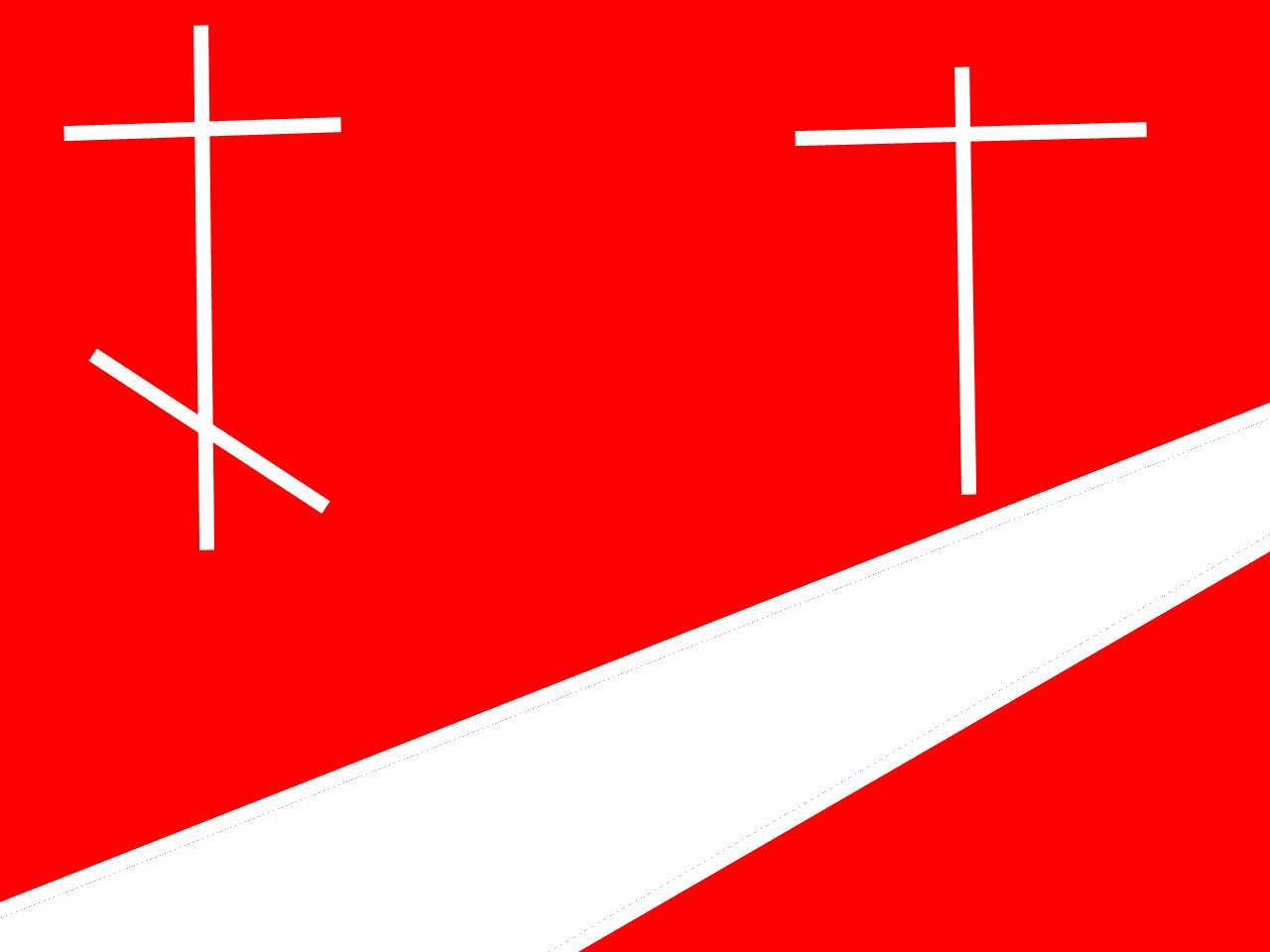
- Flag

- Location within Belarus
- Coordinates: 52°35′N 24°52′E
- Country: Belarus
- Region: Brest Region
- District: Byaroza District
- Time zone: UTC+3 (MSK)

Syalyets (Belarusian: Сялец, romanized: Sialiec; Russian: Селец, romanized: Selets; Polish: Sielec) is an agrotown in Byaroza District, Brest Region, Belarus. It serves as the administrative center of Syalyets selsoviet.

== Notable people ==
- Aleksander Okińczyc (1839–1886), physician
- Vilna Gaon (1720–1797), Talmudic scholar
