= Beryoza =

Beryoza literally meaning "birch tree" in Russian, may refer to

- Russian-language name of Byaroza, a town in Belarus
- Beryoza, call sign of Samara Airlines, Russia
- SPO-15 Beryoza, a Russian radar warning receiver
- Beryoza River, Russia
- T-80UD "Beryoza", a Russian tank T-80 model

== See also ==
- Bereza (disambiguation)
