= 105th Guards Mixed Aviation Division =

Russian Aerospace Forces formation

The 105th Guards Borisov-Pomeranian Twice Red Banner Order of Suvorov Mixed Aviation Division is an aviation division of the Russian Aerospace Forces, based in Voronezh's Voronezh Malshevo air base.

The division was first formed in 1950 as the 105th Fighter Aviation Division PVO at Kharkov Sokolniki. In late 1951 it became a regular fighter aviation division and transferred to Großenhain in East Germany. The division served there for the rest of the Cold War as part of the 24th (later 16th) Air Army. In 1960 it was renamed the 105th Fighter-Bomber Aviation Division. In August 1993, the division was withdrawn from Germany to Voronezh, and renamed the 105th Mixed Aviation Division. During the reform of the Russian Air Force in 2009, the division was converted into the 7000th Air Base and received guards title and honorifics from one of its regiments. The air base became a division again in 2013. The 105th Division has fought in the Russian military intervention in Syria.

== Cold War ==
The 105th Fighter Aviation Division PVO was activated on 15 July 1950 in Kharkov-Sokolniki, and its formation was completed on 1 October. As part of the 16th Fighter Aviation Corps PVO, the division included the 296th Fighter Aviation Regiment PVO at Kharkov-Sokolniki, and the 497th and 559th Fighter Aviation Regiments PVO at Kharkov-Osnova. All three regiments were equipped with the Mikoyan-Gurevich MiG-15. In October 1951 the division became a regular fighter aviation division and was moved to Großenhain in East Germany. The division became part of the 61st Guards Fighter Aviation Corps there. By 1960, its regiments had been reequipped with the Mikoyan-Gurevich MiG-17. The 296th was based at Altenburg, the 497th at Großenhain, and the 559th at Finsterwalde.

In March 1960 the division became a fighter-bomber aviation division. At the same time the 116th Guards Fighter-Bomber Aviation Regiment replaced the 296th. By 1970, the 116th Guards were based at Brand-Briesen Airfield and the 497th and 559th had converted to the Sukhoi Su-7B. In May 1980, the division was transferred to the 71st Fighter Aviation Corps. At this time the 497th had been reequipped with the Sukhoi Su-17M2 and the 559th with the Mikoyan MiG-27. In April 1988, the division was directly subordinated to the 16th Air Army. The 116th Guards and 497th Bomber Aviation Regiments were replaced by the 296th and 911th Fighter-Bomber Aviation Regiments in July 1989. In August 1992, the 31st Guards Fighter Aviation Regiment replaced the 911th. The division was withdrawn from Germany on 10 August 1993 after the end of the Cold War.

== Russian Air Force service ==
At Voronezh Malshevo/Baltimor, the division became part of the Air Forces of the Moscow Military District and was renamed the 105th Mixed Aviation Division. In 1994 it transferred back to the 16th Air Army, which became the 16th Mixed Aviation Corps in May 1998. In 2000, the division included the 1st Guards Bomber Aviation Regiment at Lebyazhye, the 455th Bomber Aviation Regiment at Voronezh, and the 899th Assault Aviation Regiment at Buturlinovka. The 1st and 455th Regiments were equipped with the Sukhoi Su-24, and the 899th with the Sukhoi Su-25. The 16th Corps became an army again in February 2002.

In 2009, the 16th Air Army was disbanded and replaced by the 1st Air and Air Defence Forces Command. The same year, the division became the 7000th Air Base, taking the titles of the 47th Separate Guards Reconnaissance Aviation Regiment, "Borisov Pomeranian Twice Red Banner Order of Suvorov". On 1 December 2013 the air base was reformed into the 105th Guards Mixed Aviation Division.
