= Großenhain Airport =

Abandoned military air base

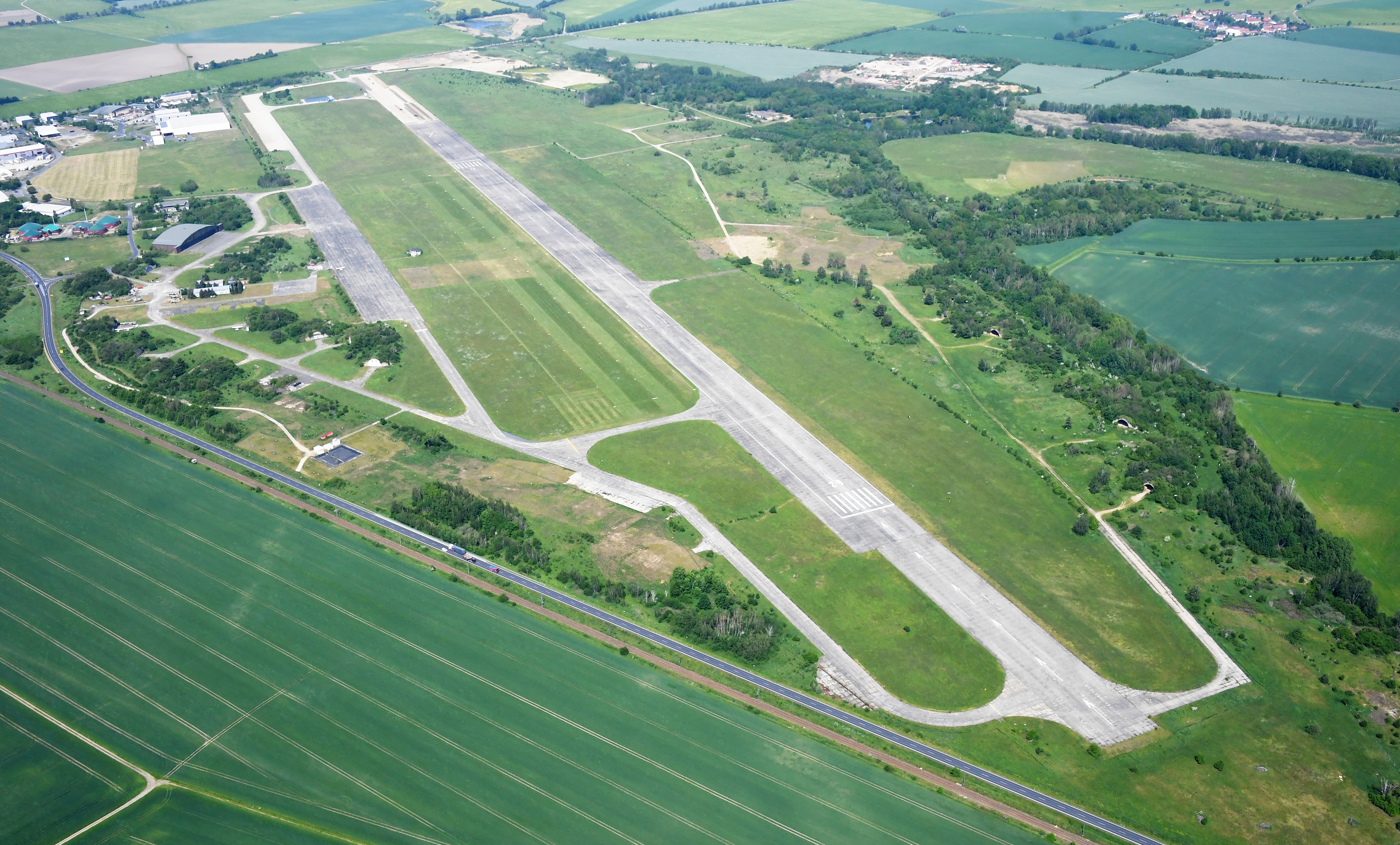
- IATA: none; ICAO: EDAK

Summary
- Airport type: Civilian
- Location: north of Großenhain, Germany
- Built: 1914
- In use: 1914 - present
- Occupants: 1914-1945 German Luftwaffe; 1945-1993 Soviet 16th Air Army
- Coordinates: 51.305°N 13.553°E

Map
- Location of airport in Saxony Großenhain Airport (Germany)

Runways
Direction	Length		Surface
Direction	ft	m	Surface
12/30		1,415	concrete

Großenhain Airport, (German: Flugplatz Großenhain) (ICAO: EDAK) is a civilian airport and former military air base located just north of the town of Großenhain, Saxony, Germany.

== History ==
=== 1913–1919 ===
After the restructuring of the Prussian Air Corps in 1913, a separate Saxon unit, the 3rd Royal Saxon Company of the 1st Royal Prussian Aviation Battalion, was created, for which Großenhain was chosen as a suitable base in Saxony. The new airfield was completed by the beginning of 1914 with a total capacity of 60 aircraft. Flight operations began on 21 February 1914 with the first landing of a DFW Stahl-Taube piloted by Lieutenant Emil Clemens with observer Lieutenant Rudolf Hasenohr.

At the beginning of the First World War, the Großenhain flying company was relocated to the Western Front. Afterwards, the Pilot Replacement Department No. 6, was founded with a pilots school and courses for observers, air gunners, bombers and aerial photographers. A total of around 60,000 men were trained in Großenhain by 1918.

In June 1915 Manfred von Richthofen was assigned to Großenhain for his initial training as an aerial observer.

=== 1919–1945 ===
Under the Treaty of Versailles Germany was banned from having an air force and on 20 May 1920 the base was officially closed. Most of the buildings were subsequently dismantled. From 1925 onwards it was intermittently used again, initially as an emergency landing field.

From 1934, the base was reactivated as part of the clandestine establishment of the Luftwaffe. On 1 March 1935, Department B of the flying school of the German Air Sports Association Celle-Wietzenbruch took over the base and immediately began training military pilots. On 1 March 1936, the unit was renamed Reconnaissance Group 23 and on 1 November 1938 it was given the final name Aufklärungsgruppe 11. After most of the squadrons were relocated shortly after the start of World War II, the Reconnaissance Aviation School 1 (F) Heer was set up on 26 August 1939. This was transferred to the Kampfgeschwader 101 on 15 February 1943 as I Group and remained the main user of the air base until February 1945. As the war continued, various fighter and fighter-bomber squadrons were stationed at Großenhain from July 1944, which also flew missions against the Red Army from here.

On 2 May 1945, Soviet forces captured the base and used it as a fighter base until the end of the war.

=== 1945–1993 ===
After the end of the war, the Soviets expanded Großenhain using the existing infrastructure and extended the runway.

In late 1951 the Soviet Air Force 105th Fighter Aviation Division equipped with the Mikoyan-Gurevich MiG-15s was transferred to Großenhain. By 1960, its regiments had been reequipped with the Mikoyan-Gurevich MiG-17, with only the 497th still based at Großenhain. By 1970, the 497th had converted to the Sukhoi Su-7B becoming a fighter-bomber unit.

The Soviets constructed a special weapons bunker for the storage of nuclear weapons at the base.

On 27 May 1973, Soviet aircraft technician senior lieutenant Yevgeny Vronsky stole an Su-7BM fighter-bomber from the base. Vronsky had no flight training, but nevertheless he safely crossed the West German border and then ejected. The plane crashed into a forest near the city of Braunschweig.

By 1980 the 497th had been reequipped with the Sukhoi Su-17M2. The 497th Bomber Aviation Regiment was replaced by the 296th Fighter-Bomber Aviation Regiment equipped with Mikoyan MiG-27s in July 1989. The regiment was withdrawn from Germany on 10 August 1993 after the end of the Cold War.

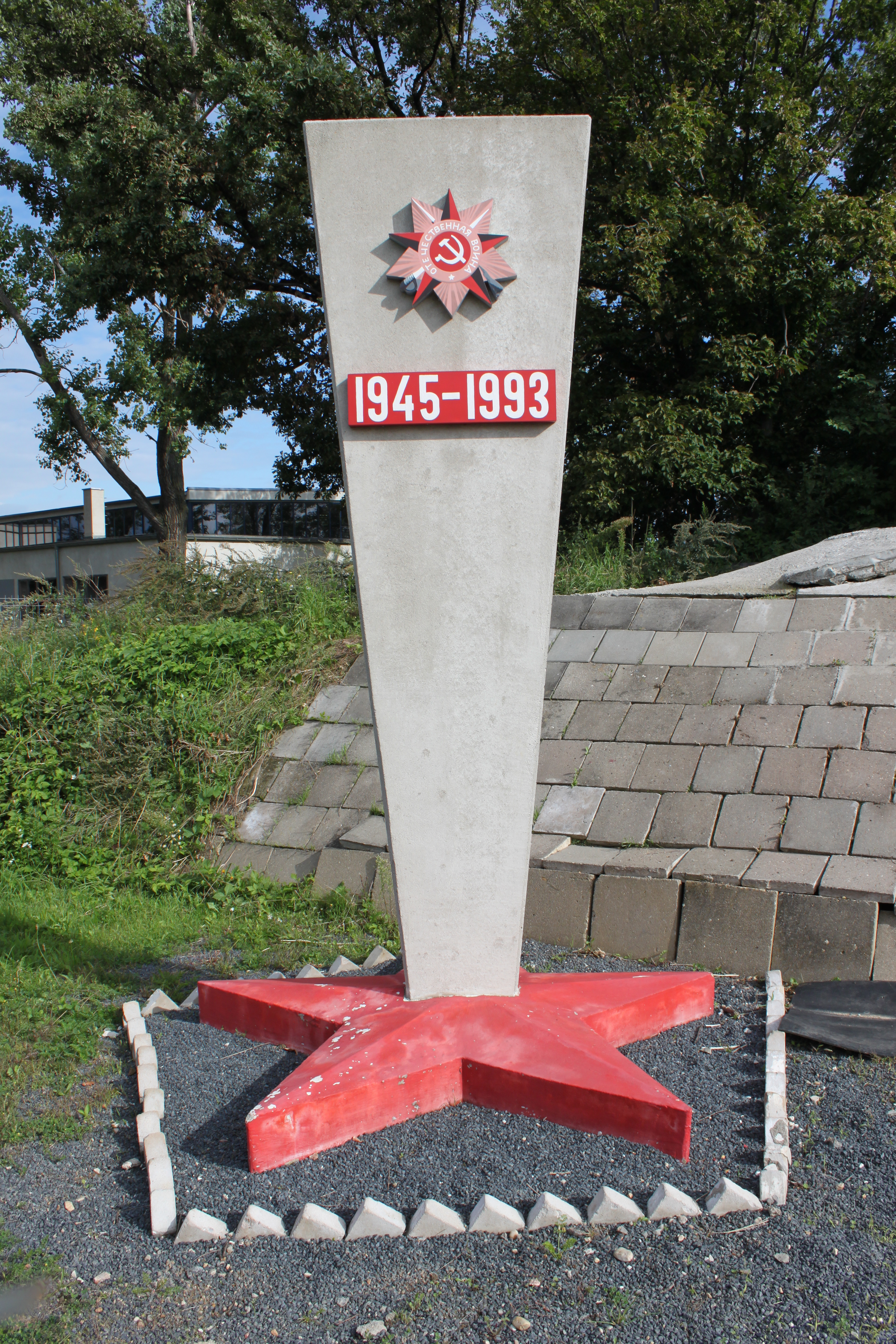
Memorial at the Airport in Großenhain.

=== 1993–present ===
Following the withdrawal of Soviet forces, the airfield was converted for civilian use. The first civil flights took place from May 1993. On 23 September 1993 the Federal Property Office took over the site, which subsequently became the property of the Free State of Saxony.

The Fliegendes Museum Historische Flugzeuge Josef Koch is located at the airport.

In December 2022, the Free State of Saxony, the district of Meißen and the city of Großenhain signed a declaration of intent that flight operations should be discontinued in order to be able to develop a 145-hectare industrial area on the site.

In 2023 Rheinmetall planned to build a new munitions factory on part of the airfield site, but this was opposed by the local government and residents.
