= Strasshof concentration camp =

Strasshof was a Nazi German transit camp (German: Durchgangslager or Dulag) located in Strasshof an der Nordbahn, near Vienna, Austria. While the camp was established in early 1942 to house foreign forced labor (Ostarbeiter), it is most notable for its role in the 1944 deportation of Hungarian Jews during the Holocaust.

== History ==
In the spring of 1942, the camp was opened to process forced laborers from Eastern Europe, primarily from Ukraine and Russia, who were sent to work in the armaments industry and agriculture around Vienna.

In June 1944, following negotiations between the SS (represented by Adolf Eichmann) and the Aid and Rescue Committee (led by Rudolf Kasztner), approximately 21,000 Hungarian Jews were diverted to Strasshof instead of being sent to Auschwitz. Known as being "kept on ice," these families were used as forced labor in and around Vienna. This arrangement was partially initiated by Karl Blaschke, the Mayor of Vienna, who sought laborers to replace Austrians mobilized for the war.

== Liberation ==
The camp remained operational until late 1944, when it was damaged by Allied air raids. It was eventually liberated by the Red Army on April 10, 1945. Most of the Hungarian Jews at Strasshof survived the war, a stark contrast to the fate of those sent directly to extermination camps.
