= Giovanni Battista Gisleni =

Italian architect, designer, theater director and musician (1600-1672)

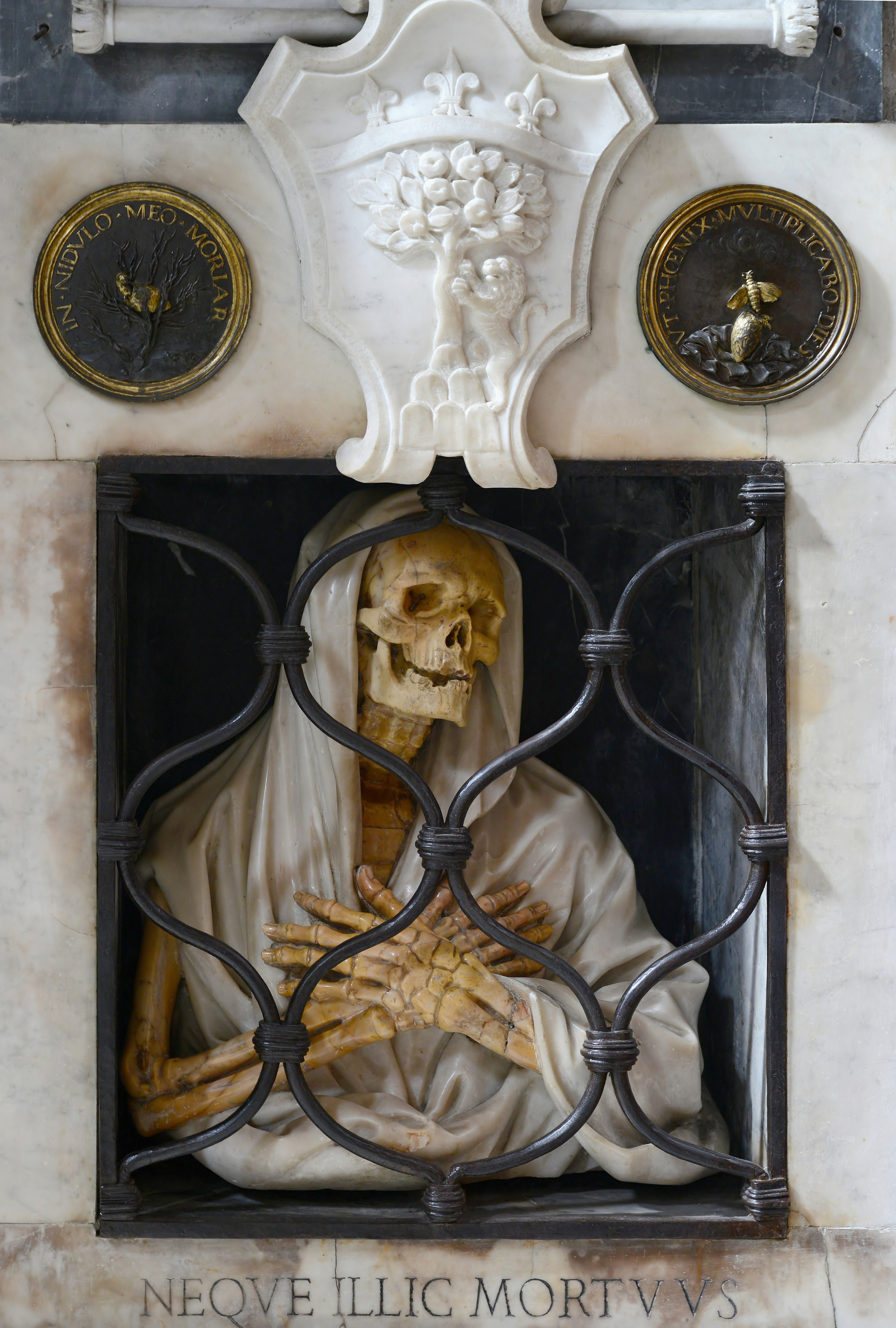
Detail of Gisleni's tomb in the church of Santa Maria del Popolo in Rome.

The Biaroza monastery – painting by Napoleon Orda

Giovanni Battista Gisleni (1600 – 3 May 1672) was an Italian Baroque architect, stage designer, theater director, singer, and musician at the Polish-Lithuanian royal court.

Gisleni was born and died in Rome. He served three Polish-Lithuanian kings of the Vasa dynasty: Sigismund III, Władysław IV and John II Casimir, during the years 1630–1668. Gisleni's tomb in the church of Santa Maria del Popolo in Rome takes the form of a memento mori, showing an intricately carved skeleton figure of Death.

== Main works ==
- Biaroza monastery of the Carthusians in present-day Belarus (1648)
- Church of the Discalced Carmelite Nuns in Lviv (1642)
- Church of the Discalced Carmelites in Warsaw (1652)
- project of an altar for the Miraculous Icon of Black Madonna of Częstochowa, Jasna Góra in Częstochowa (circa 1630)
- Baroque Altar funded by bishop Piotr Gembicki in the Wawel Cathedral (circa 1650)

== Publications ==
- Varii disegni d'architettura inventati e delineati da Gio:Battista Gisleni Romano architetto delle MMta et Sermo Prencipe di Polonia e Sueta Sir John Soane's Museum, London – 116 mostly unrealized projects
- 12 drawings. Milan, Castello Sforzesco.
- Architectural projects by Gisleni and other architects. Dresden, Kupferstichkab.; Skizzenbuch des G. Chiaveri.
