= Strasshof an der Nordbahn =

Strasshof an der Nordbahn Strasshof aun da Noadbauh
- Municipality
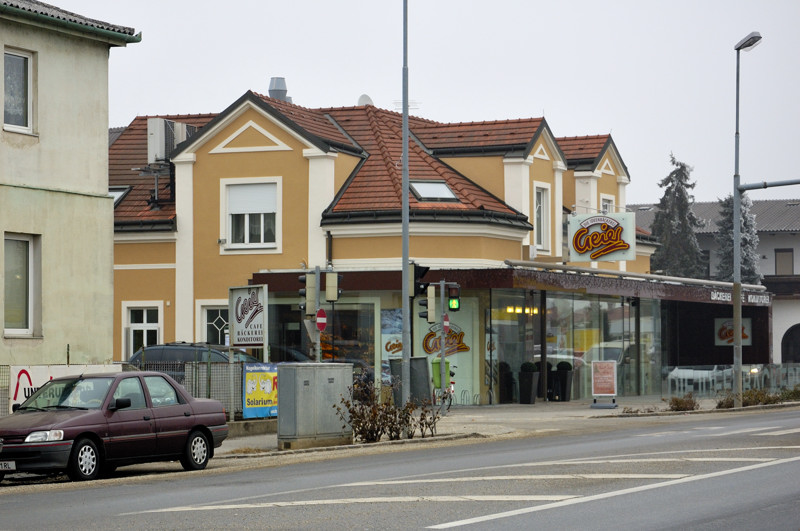
- Hauptstraße

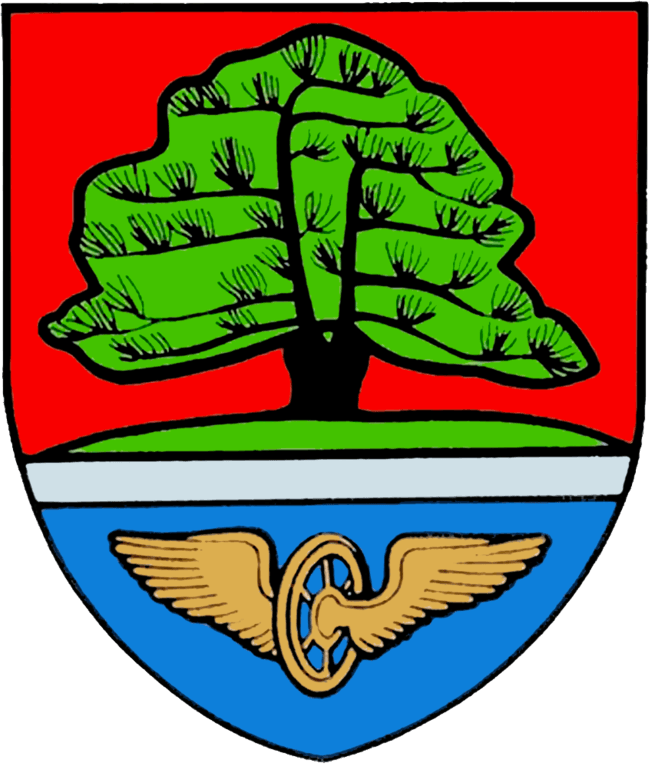
- Coat of arms

- Location within Austria
- Coordinates: 48°19′10″N 16°38′51″E
- Country: Austria
- State: Lower Austria
- District: Gänserndorf

Government
  - Mayor: Ludwig Deltl (SPÖ)

Area
  - Total: 11.64 km^{2} (4.49 sq mi)
- Elevation: 165 m (541 ft)

Population (2018-01-01)
  - Total: 10,009
  - Density: 859.9/km^{2} (2,227/sq mi)
- Time zone: UTC+1 (CET)
  - Summer (DST): UTC+2 (CEST)
- Postal code: 2231
- Area code: 02287
- Vehicle registration: GF
- Website: Willkomen in STRASSHOF an der Nordbahn (in German)

Strasshof an der Nordbahn (meaning Strasshof at the Northern railway; Central Bavarian: Strasshof aun da Noadbauh) is a satellite town 25 km east of Vienna, Austria. A historical locomotive built by LOFAG is displayed in the town.

== Geography ==
Strasshof an der Nordbahn lies in Marchfeld in Lower Austria. About 21.08 percent of the municipality is forested.

== History ==
Strasshof had about 50 inhabitants in 1900, and a railroad yard functioned from 1908 to 1959. In 1944, about 75 percent of 21,000 Hungarian Jews deported from the concentration camp at Strasshof survived due to an agreement between the Aid and Rescue Committee of Budapest and Adolf Eichmann.

On 2 December 1944 the marshalling yard in "Straszhof" was targeted in a United States Army Air Forces bombing by the 47th Bombardment Wing. There was solid overcast over the city causing the wing to bomb Wien Floridsdorf Shell Refinery as an alternative. The west marshalling yard was bombed on 26 March 1945 by the 49th BW between 12:24 and 12:36; several large fires were noted among goods wagons.

After the end of the Second World War, much of eastern Austria was occupied temporarily by the Soviet Union. The 927th Fighter Aviation Regiment of the 59th Air Army, Soviet Air Forces, operated from Strasshof from 1952 to 1955, before being moved to Bereza in the Belorussian Military District.

On 23 August 2006, kidnapped teenager Natascha Kampusch escaped after nearly 8½ years imprisonment in a cellar of a Strasshof house. The kidnapper Wolfgang Přiklopil committed suicide on the evening of the same day.

== Population ==
Historical population
| Year | Pop. | ±% |
|---|---|---|
| 1971 | 4,377 | — |
| 1981 | 4,973 | +13.6% |
| 1991 | 5,673 | +14.1% |
| 2001 | 6,993 | +23.3% |
| 2011 | 8,543 | +22.2% |
| 2018 | 10,009 | +17.2% |
