= Aleksander Okińczyc =

Physician (1839–1886)

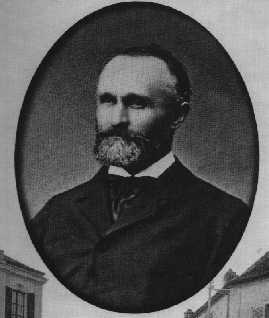
- Born: 28 January 1839; Sielec, Grodno Governorate, Russian Empire (now Belarus)
- Died: 18 March 1886 (aged 47); Villepreux, France
- Medical career
- Profession: "Médecin des pauvres"

Aleksander Okińczyc (Belarusian: Аляксандар Акінчыц, romanized: Aliaksandr Akinchyts; 1839–1886) was a Polish and French medical doctor and memoirist of Belarusian ethnicity.

He was sent to Siberia by Tsar Alexander II's troops after participating in the January Uprising in Belarus, Poland and Lithuania. From there, he escaped to the West with Zygmunt Mineyko and other prisoners. He re-established himself in France and became a doctor.

There, he wrote in Polish the story of his adventure, which was later translated into French by Joséphine Bohdan. The original Polish written version of the memoirs seems to be owned by Jean and Madeleine Okinczyc. The doctor died in Villepreux. There, the "Association des amis du vieux Villepreux" offers a museum about the "Docteur Alexandre" and there is a street named "rue du Docteur Alexandre".

He was the son-in-law of Polish romantic poet, Józef Bohdan Zaleski (1802–1886), who also died in Villepreux.
