= Battle of Bereza Kartuska =

1919 and 1920 battles in the Polish–Soviet War

Coordinates: 52°33′N 24°58′E

- Part of Polish–Soviet War
- Polish-Soviet & Lithuanian-Soviet Wars of 1919: Polish & Lithuanian counterattacks marked in blue.
| Date | 14 February 1919 |
| Location | Near Bereza Kartuska, near Brzesc, Belarus |
| Result | Polish victory: Beginning of the Polish-Soviet War |

Belligerents
| (Second Polish Republic) Poland | (Russian Soviet Federative Socialist Republic) Russian SFSR |

Commanders and leaders
| Józef Haller | Unknown |

Strength
| 62 soldiers | 86 soldiers |

Casualties and losses
| Unknown | 80 captured |

The Battle of Bereza Kartuska was fought between the Second Polish Republic and Soviet Russia around the village Bereza Kartuska (now Byaroza, Belarus) first on 14 February 1919, and again between 21 and 26 July 1920.

The first skirmish of Bereza is considered to be the initial engagement of the Polish–Soviet War of 1919–1921 by some historians.

== History ==
After German and Polish representatives signed an evacuation agreement on 5 February 1919, the ten battalions of the newly formed Polish Army were to pass through German Oberkommando-Ostfront (Ober-Ost) lines at Wolkowysk to reach the Bolshevik front, where on 12 January 1919, the Soviet Supreme Command ordered a "reconnaissance in depth", codenamed Target Vistula.

It is problematical whether this [Soviet] operation, which bore the code name 'Target Vistula' was intended to bring the Red Army as conquering heroes into Warsaw. Its name suggest so. Yet the extremely tentative phrasing of its directives and the extremely parlous state of the Western Army suggests otherwise.

In February 1919, both Soviet Russia and newly reborn Poland were in their infancy, and both only months old. On 13 February 1919, at 7 in the morning, 57 Polish soldiers and 5 officers, led by Capt. Mienicki of the Polish Wilno Detachment, made a sortie into the township of Biaroza (Polish: Bereza), a small city to the east of Brzesc, capturing 80 soldiers of the Red Army.

=== The second Battle of Bereza Kartuska ===
One year later, between 21 and 26 July 1920, soldiers of the Polish 14th Infantry Division under General Daniel Konarzewski once again clashed with the Red Army in Bereza Kartuska, soon after the Battle of Warsaw (1920). Poles had retreated from Baranowicze, abandoning German Imperial Army fortifications constructed there during World War I, and took defensive positions along the Jasiołda River. After three days of heavy fighting, the 14th I.D. once again was forced to retreat towards Kobryn, after burning the bridges on the Jasiołda. The town of Bereza Kartuska was retaken by the Polish Army and, at the end of the Polish–Soviet War, ceded to Poland in the Peace of Riga signed by Soviet Russia (acting also on behalf of Soviet Belarus). The peace treaty remained in force until the Soviet invasion of Poland in 1939.
