= Jakob Klatzkin =

Belarusian-born German Jewish philosopher and author

Yakov Klaczkin
- יעקב קלצקין
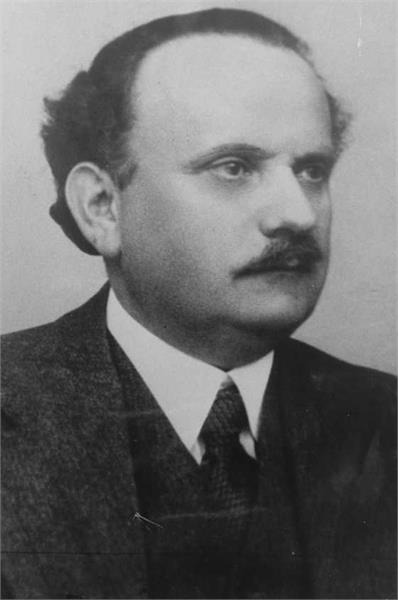
- Jacob Klatzkin 1940
- Born: October 3, 1882; Byaroza, Belarus (then Russian Empire)
- Died: March 26, 1948 (aged 65)

Philosophical work
- Notable works: German Encyclopaedia Judaica and others

Jakob Klatzkin, Yakov/Jakub Klaczkin (Hebrew: יעקב קלצקין; Russian: Яков Клачкин; October 3, 1882, in Biaroza, Grodno Governorate, now Belarus – March 26, 1948, in Vevey, Switzerland) was a Jewish philosopher, publicist, author, and publisher.

== Life ==
Klatzkin was born in Byaroza-Kartuskaya, a son of the local Rabbi Eliyahu Klatzkin. He received his early schooling from his father and yeshivas in Lithuania. Later he traveled to Germany to study with philosopher Hermann Cohen. Klatzkin received his doctorate from the University of Berne in Switzerland, then returned to Germany to write for Hebrew periodicals and establish Jewish publishing firms. He also served as director of the Jewish National Fund in Cologne.

He wrote widely on the philosopher Baruch Spinoza, translating the latter's Ethics to Hebrew, and by celebrating the radical and herem philosopher's Jewish character, reclaiming him as an exclusively Jewish hero through the Hebrew language instead of religious orthodoxy. He also compiled 10 of 15 anticipated volumes of the German Encyclopaedia Judaica with Nahum Goldmann. Klatzkin had a close relationship with Arnold Schoenberg, a Jewish musician who was also active in advancing the need to establish a place of refuge for the Jews in the 1930s.

After the Nazis' rise to power in 1933, Klatzkin fled to Switzerland and earned a living giving lectures on various Jewish subjects. He moved to the United States in 1941 and continued to teach in Chicago at the College of Jewish Studies. He returned to Switzerland in 1947 and died there at the age of 66.

== Beliefs ==
He rejected the notion of chosenness for the Jewish people, either religious or secular. He argued that the only meaningful goal for Zionism was regaining the land of Israel and normalizing the conditions of Jewish existence. He believed that assimilationists were "traitors to their Judaism". He criticized Ahad Ha-Am for the notion that morality was the key to Israel's uniqueness. He believed that ethics are universal, not the possession of a particular people. He maintained that the spiritual definition of Judaism denied freedom of thought and led to national chauvinism. Klatzkin proposed a Jewish covenant that is based on secular-nationalist terms. Here, the Jewish state does not pursue any messianic or colonialist mission and instead a territorial Zionism that is normal, national state and culture.

Klatzkin also developed an alternative to the Freudian view of life, which holds that it can only be understood from within. This involved his theory of the mind, which emphasizes the so-called rift between life and the spirit or the living or the original, unmediated soul and the spirit. The conflict, according to Klatzkin, is the reason why man live in constant alienation from the world.

== Literary works ==
- Otzar Munahim ha'Philosophim (Philosophy Terms), 4 vols. (printed in Berlin)
- "Baruch Spinoza, Hermann Cohen, and Crayim" (printed in Berlin)
- "Mishnat Rishonim", a philosophical anthology (printed in Berlin)
- "Shkiyatahayim, philosophical discussions" (printed in Berlin)
- Truhmim, Zutot, and Mishnat Ahonim, and Tavim (printed after he died)
- "Krisis und Entscheidung im Judentum" (Berlin, 1921)
- "Probleme des modernen Judentums" (Berlin, 1918; Berlin, 1930)
- "Hermann Cohen" (Berlin, 1919)
- "Der Erkenntnistrieb als Lebens und Todesprinzip" (Zurich, 1935)
- "German Encyclopaedia Judaica" (completed 10 of 15 intended volumes)
