= Coat of arms of Biaroza =

- Armiger: City of Biaroza
- Adopted: 2008 (previous version in 1997)
- Shield: Shield horizontally divided into the larger blue part and a white tip of the shield, separated by a white and a blue waved lines; in the blue field, a silver monastery gate.

The coat of arms of the town of Biaroza in Brest Region, Belarus, in its current version was officially adopted in 2008 basing on an earlier version developed in the 1990s.

Unlike many other towns and cities in Belarus, historically Biaroza had no Magdeburg rights and therefore no coat of arms before the late 20th century.

== Symbolism ==
The monastery gate symbolizes the Biaroza Charterhouse, the town’s most important landmark. The waved lines symbolize the river Jasielda on which Biaroza is located.

== Earlier version ==
The first version of the coat of arms was developed in the 1990s by Rolf Grotrian, a German owner of a design bureau who was engaged in residential construction projects in Biaroza at that time.

The coat of arms was described as a silver shield horizontally divided by a blue waved line, above the line a red monastery gate and below the line a green leave of a birch tree.
