= Byaroza Monastery =

Former Catholic monastery in Byaroza, Belarus

Coordinates: 52°31′55″N 24°57′33″E

Carthusian Monastery of Biaroza
- Бярозаўскі кляштар картузаў
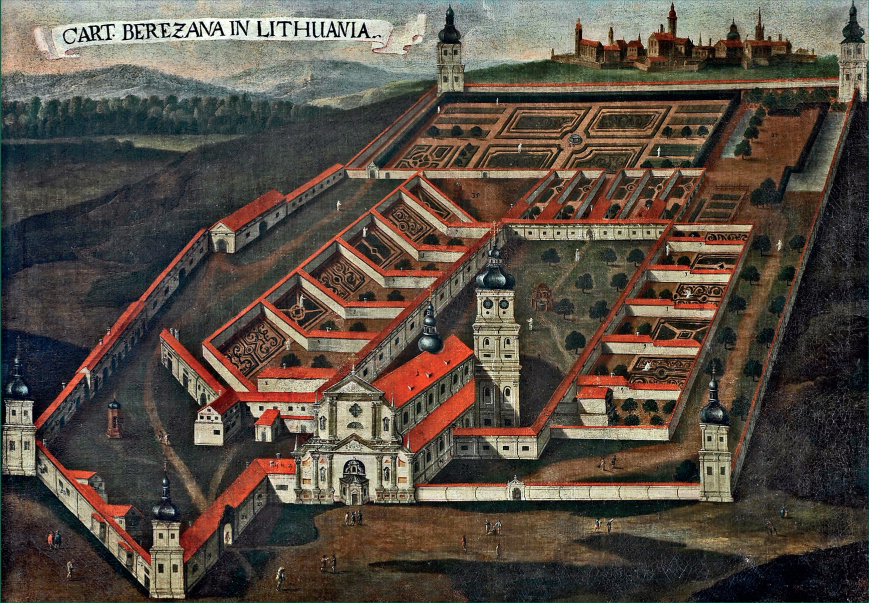
- Biaroza monastery on a 1750 painting

- Location within Belarus

Monastery information
- Established: 1666
- Disestablished: after 1831
- Controlled churches: Church of the Holy Cross

Architecture
- Architect: Giovanni Battista Gisleni
- Style: Baroque
- Groundbreaking: 1648
- Completed date: 18th century

Site
- Location: Biaroza

The Byaroza monastery - painting by Napoleon Orda

Byaroza monastery refers to the ruins of the former Carthusian baroque Catholic Monastery of the Holy Cross, constructed in the seventeenth century in the Polish–Lithuanian Commonwealth and today situated in Belarus.

== Foundation ==
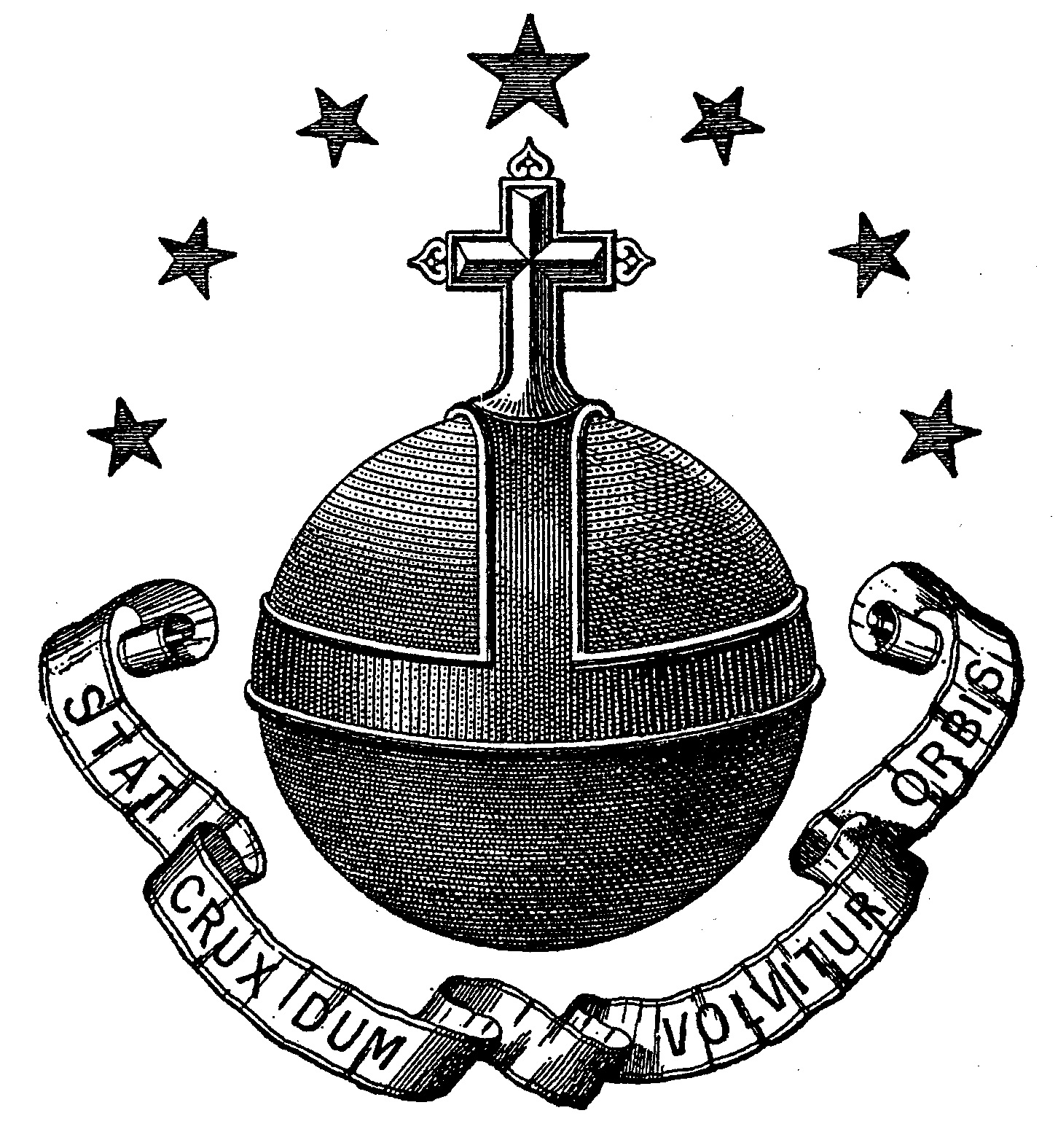
Emblem of the Carthusian order

In the 17th century, the village of Byaroza belonged to the Sapieha, a powerful magnate family in the Polish–Lithuanian Commonwealth, who founded a fortified monastery and a palace in the village. In 1648, the monastery was presented to the Carthusian monks who came from the Italian town of Treviso and settled in the monastery.

The cornerstone of the monastery was laid in 1648 by the monastery's founder, Kazimierz Leon Sapieha, in the presence of bishop Andrej Hiembinski and the nuncio of Rome, Jan de Torres. Historians state that the monastery's architect was Giovanni Battista Gisleni, who worked for 40 years in the eastern Commonwealth (now Belarus). Kazimierz Leon Sapieha, the son of the Commonwealth magnate Lew Sapieha and member of the powerful Sapieha family, was the main sponsor of the project.

The monastery was to be built on the place where a wooden cross was found in the forest. Therefore, the monastery was also named after the Holy Cross.

The monastery was consecrated in 1666, but work on construction of the church continued until the 18th century. As a result, it became one of the most beautiful among the monastery churches of the Rhine province of the eastern Commonwealth (now Belarus).

The charterhouse was also expanded and became one of the biggest monasteries in the Polish–Lithuanian Commonwealth. The monastic order (the Carthusians) gave their name to the second part of the village's (which grew into a town) name (in Belarusian, the Бяроза-Картуская, Biaroza Kartuskaja, in Polish the Bereza Kartuska).

In addition, the monastery had large living premises, a pharmacy, a botanical garden, and an economic infrastructure. A palace of the Sapiehas was built close to the monastery.

During the Great Northern War, the monastery housed a conference held by King August II of Poland and Tsar Peter I of Russia.

== Economic activities of the monastery ==
During its 200-year-long existence the Byaroza monastery was the owner of a large territory. The main sources of the monastery's income were land operations and gifts of local szlachta and magnates. The monastery acted as creditor, and monopolised the local trade of salt, wine, honey and bread.

== Monastery's degradation ==
In 1706, the fortified monastery was put under siege and then taken by assault and looted by the forces of Charles XII of Sweden. Two years later, Swedish forces again looted the area, which resulted in almost total depopulation of the town. It was also damaged by the armies of Alexander Suvorov in 1772, during the Partitions of Poland.

After the Partitions of Poland and the annexation of Belarus by the Russian Empire, the number of monks shrank to six persons and the monastery's huge treasures were robbed. After the closure of Carthusian monasteries on the territory of Poland, the Biaroza monastery remained the last active monastery of the order on the territory of the former Commonwealth.

Russian authorities made efforts to close down the monastery of Biaroza. In 1823 the monks were claimed to have taken part in the uprising led by Tadeusz Kościuszko thirty years earlier, but no evidence of this could be found.

After the November Uprising (1831), Russian authorities closed down the monastery. The monastery's infrastructure was given to the army. The city of Byaroza-Kartuskaya (Carthusian Byaroza) was renamed Byaroza-Kazionnaya (State-owned Byaroza).

== After closure ==
Coat of arms of Biaroza, adopted in 1997, with the gate of the monastery

The premises of the former monastery were used by Russians as casernes. After the next uprising in the former Polish–Lithuanian Commonwealth (1863) Russians started destroying the walls of the monastery and building casernes out of the monastery wall bricks.

Poland gained independence after World War I, and in the aftermath of the Polish-Soviet War (1919–1920) the territory of Belarus was split between Poland and the Soviet Union. In the 1930s the former Russian barracks were rebuilt by the Polish authorities and adapted into a prison for political prisoners. After the reunification of West Belarus and East Belarus within the framework of the Soviet Byelorussia, a Soviet military unit was placed within the walls of the monastery. This led to the further degradation of the site.

== Modern state ==
At the beginning of the 1990s the monastery was placed on the list of the historic architectural heritage of Belarus. There was a project of renovation and restoration of the Byaroza monastery, however so far little progress was made.

As of 2015, the gates of the monastery, that appear on the coat of arms of Byaroza, are renovated, renovation of the monastery church is planned.

== Gallery ==
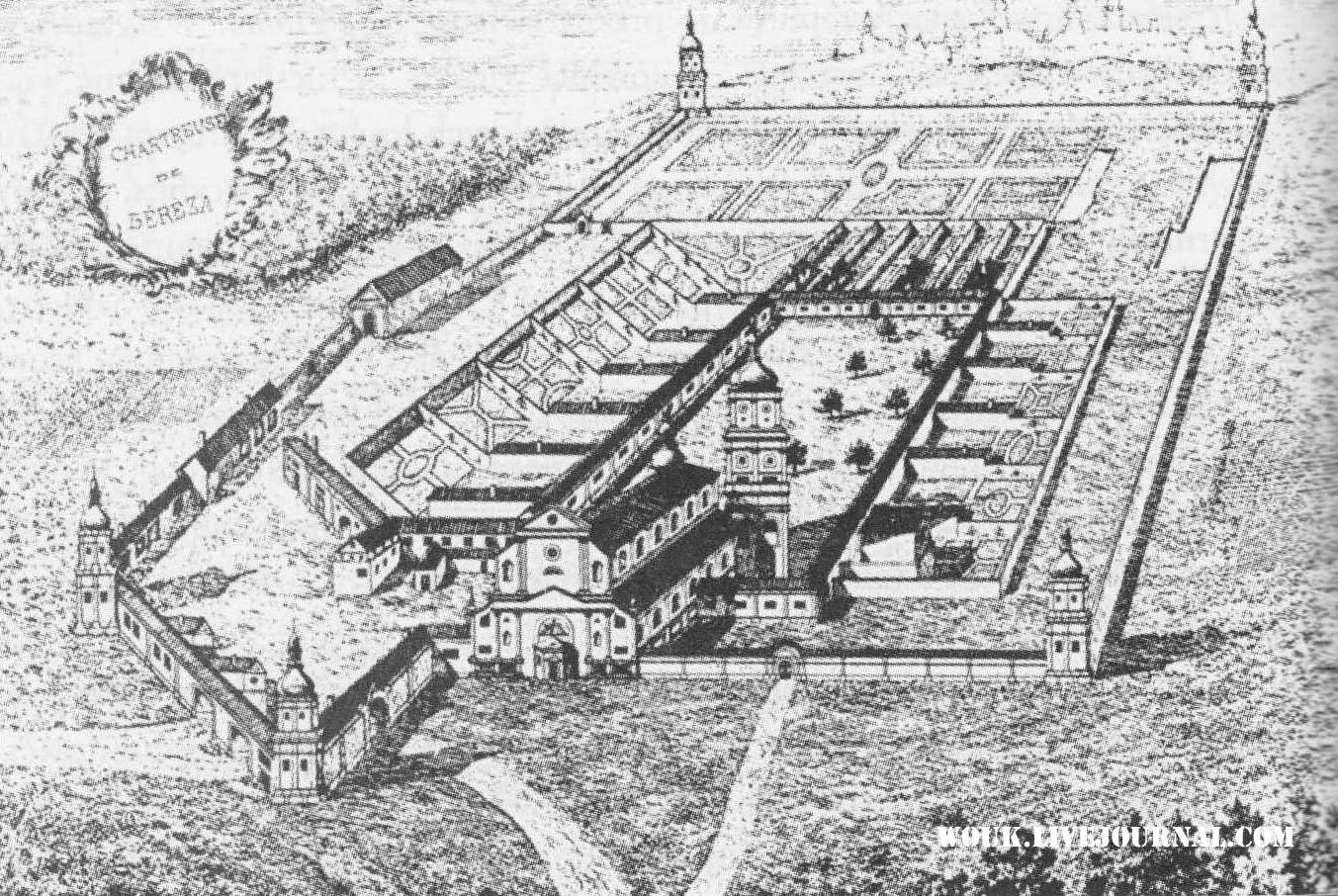
Monastery in 18th century

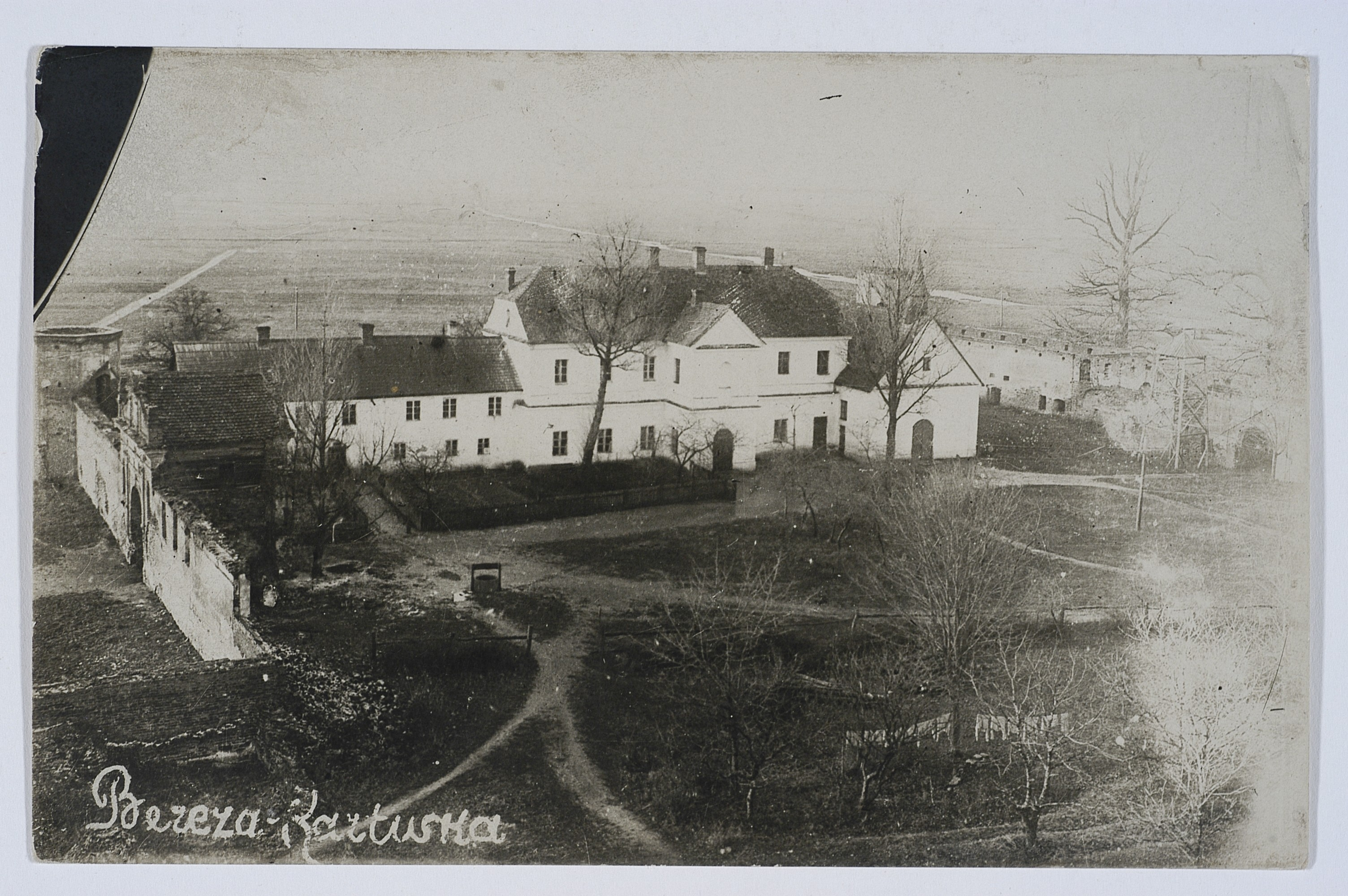
Byaroza monastery in early 20th century

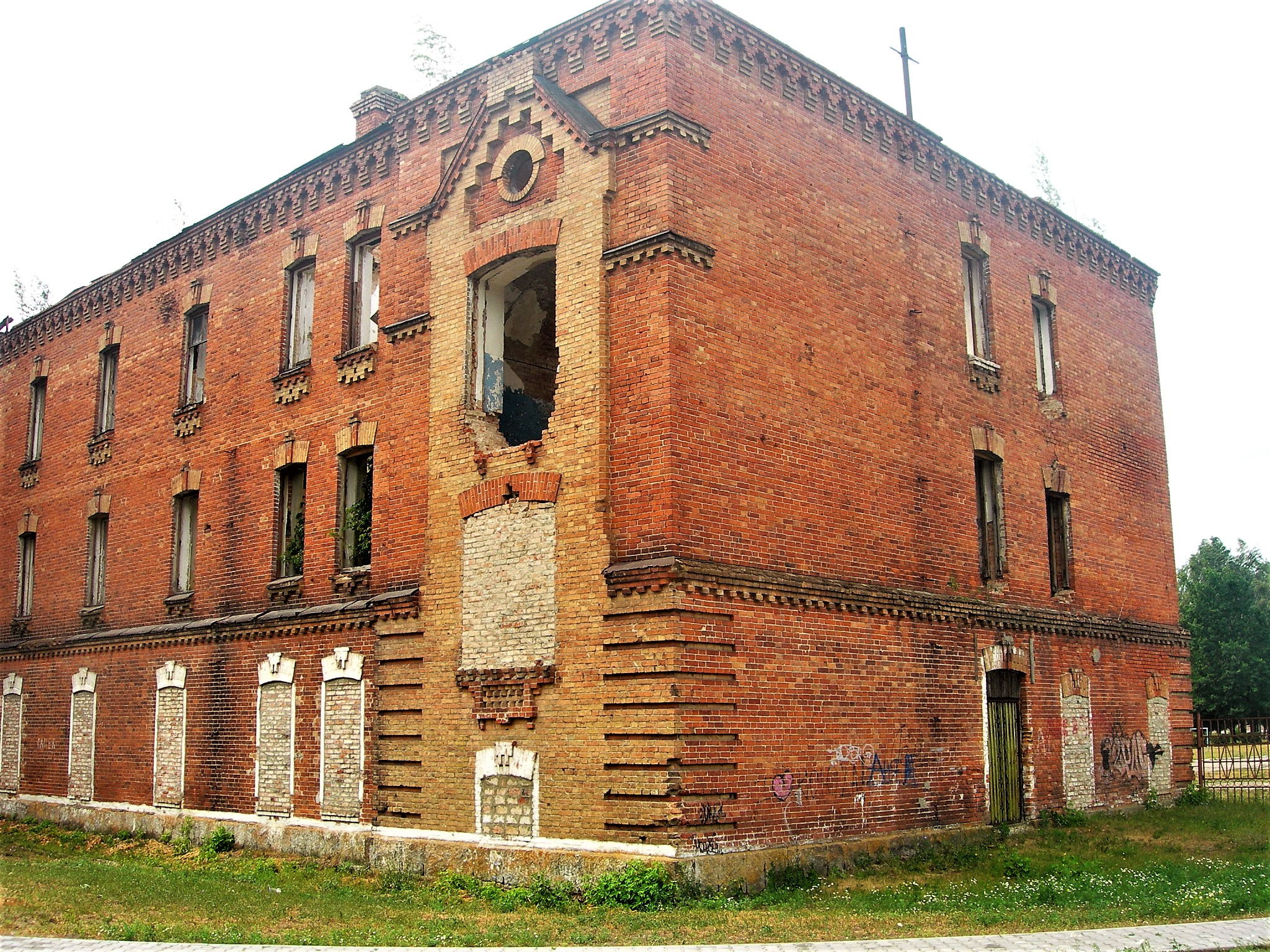
Russian barracks built of red monastery brick

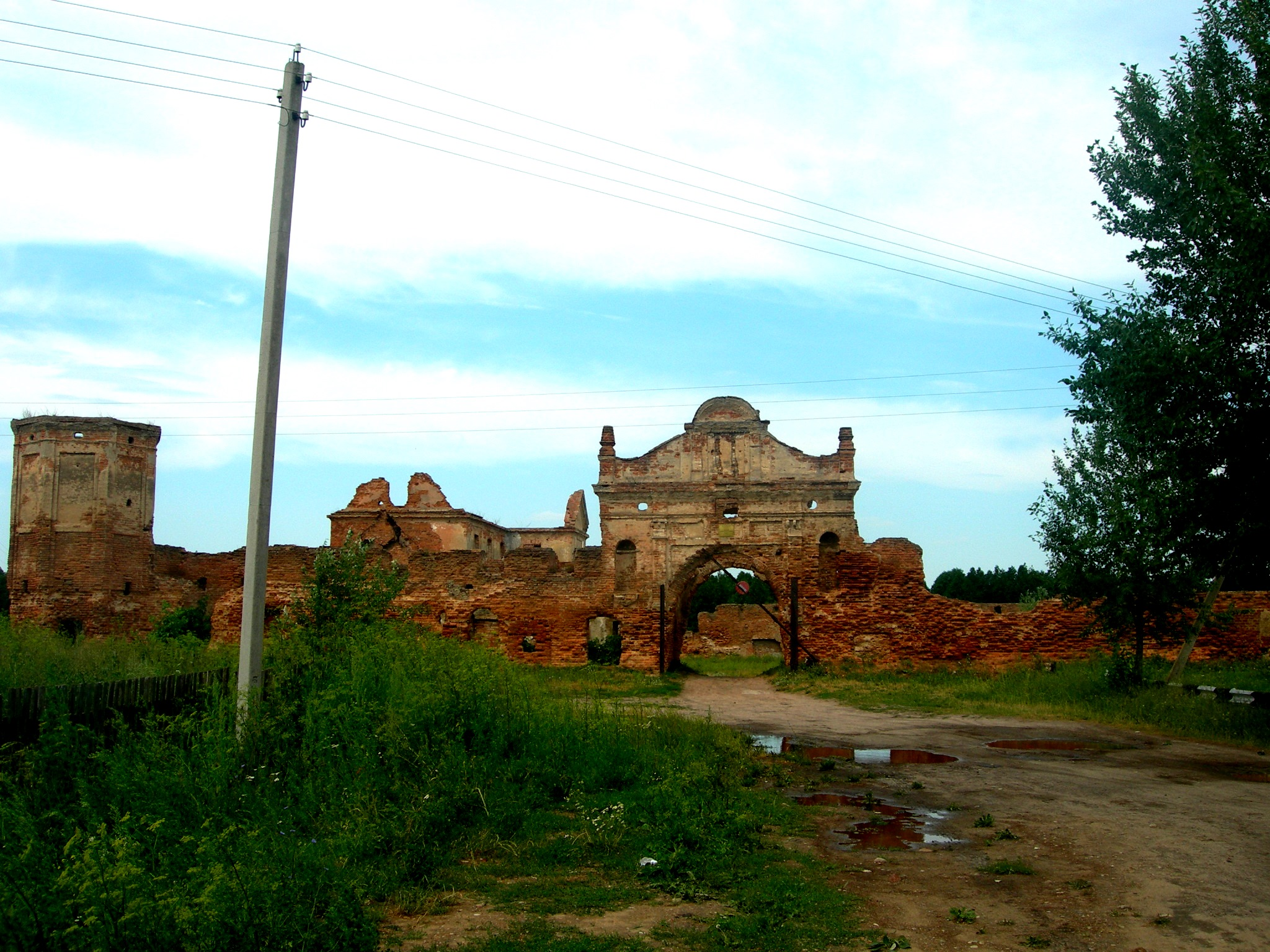
Monastery gate - also to be found on the modern city coat of arms of Byaroza

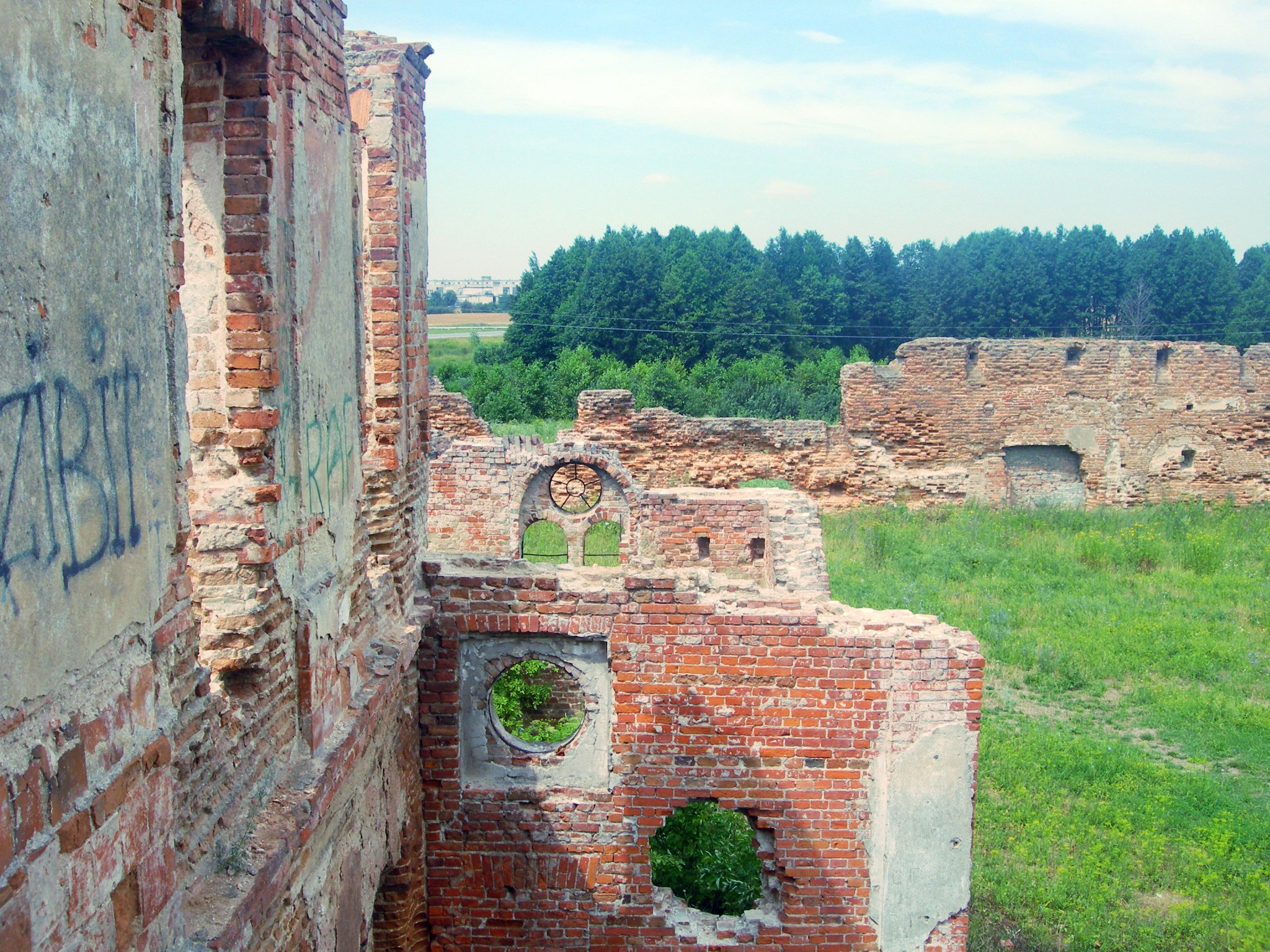
Byaroza monastery today
