= Schuchin (air base) =

Former military airfield in Belarus

Schuchin
- Shchuchyn, Grodno Region in Belarus

Site information
- Type: Air Base
- Owner: Ministry of Defence
- Operator: Belarusian Air Force

Location
- Shown within Belarus
- Coordinates: 53°35′57″N 24°45′57″E

Site history
- Built: 1945
- In use: 1945 - 1993

Airfield information
- Elevation: 10 metres (33 ft) AMSL
Runways
Direction	Length and surface
02/20	2,500 metres (8,202 ft) Concrete

Schuchin is a former airbase of the Belarusian Air Force located near Shchuchyn, Grodno Region, Belarus.

The base was home to the:

- 10th Independent Reconnaissance Aviation Regiment between 1945 and 1993 with the Mikoyan-Gurevich MiG-25 (ASCC: Foxbat), Sukhoi Su-24 (ASCC: Fencer) and Mikoyan-Gurevich MiG-21 (ASCC: Fishbed)
- 129th Fighter Aviation Division between 1945 and 1952.
  - 790th Fighter Aviation Regiment between 1945 and 1952 with the Lavochkin La-5, Lavochkin La-7 & Lavochkin La-9 (ASCC: Fritz).
- 157th Bomber Aviation Division between 1954 and 1961
  - 993rd Bomber Aviation Regiment with Ilyushin Il-28 (ASCC: Beagle).
  - 998th Bomber Aviation Regiment with Il-28.
- 979th Fighter Aviation Regiment between 1960 and 1989 with the Mikoyan-Gurevich MiG-23 (ASCC: Flogger).
- 151st Independent Aviation Regiment for Electronic Warfare between 1989 and 1993 with the MiG-25.
