= Bereza, Sumy Oblast =

Village in Sumy Oblast, Ukraine

Bereza Береза
- Village
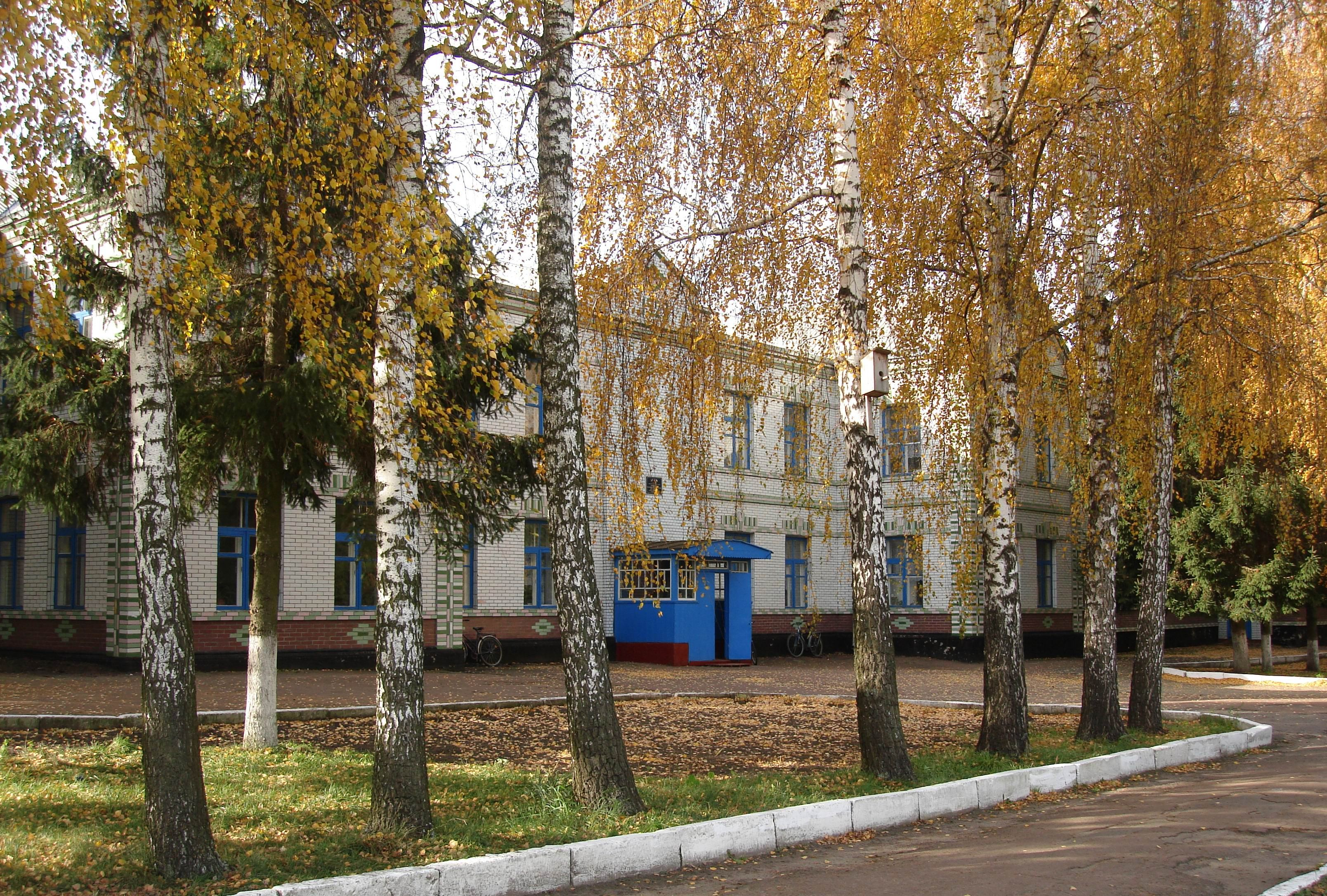
- Bereza school

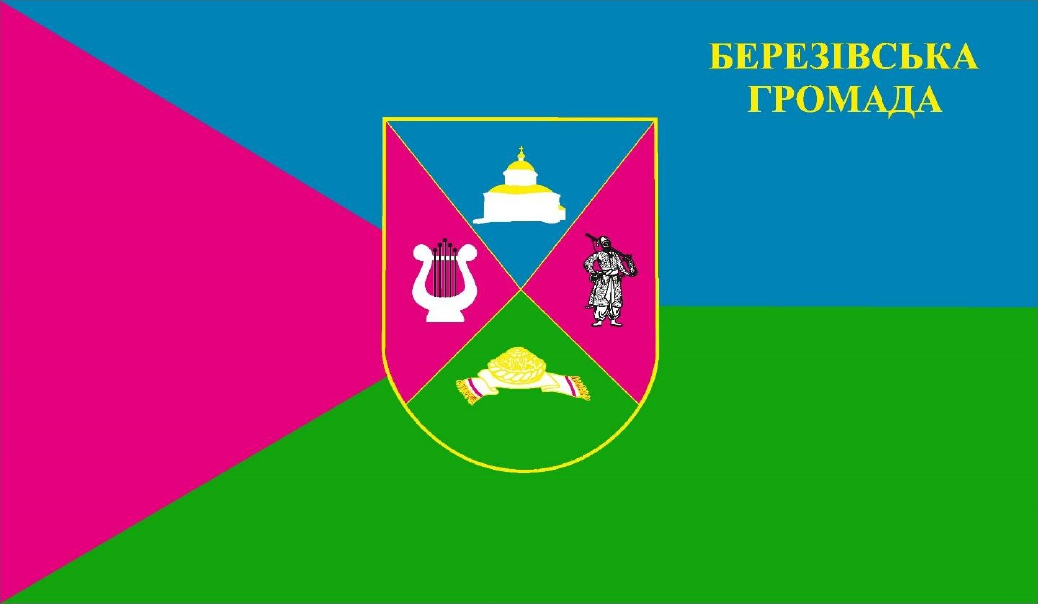
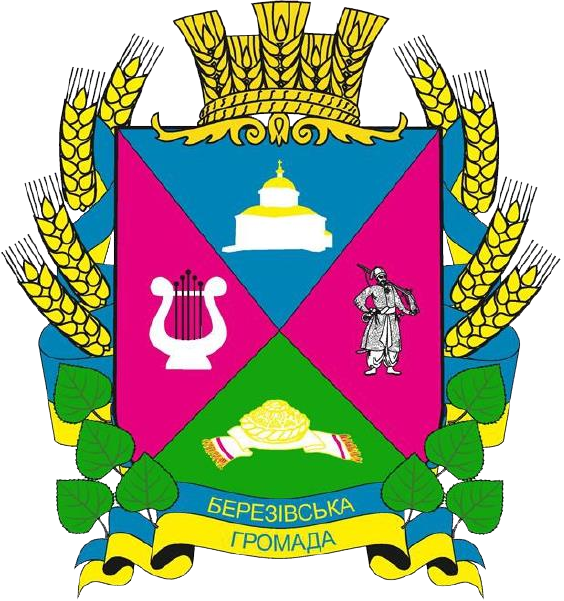
- Flag Coat of arms

- Location of Bereza in Sumy Oblast Location of Bereza in Ukraine
- Coordinates: 51°44′08″N 33°52′01″E
- Country: Ukraine
- Oblast: Sumy Oblast
- Raion: Shostka Raion
- Hromada: Bereza rural hromada
- First mentioned: 17th century

Population
  - Total: 1,371

Bereza (Ukrainian: Береза; Russian: Берёза, romanized: Beryoza) is a village in Shostka Raion, Sumy Oblast, in central Ukraine. It is the administrative centre of Bereza rural hromada, one of the hromadas of Ukraine, and has a population of 1,371 (as of 2023).

== History ==
Bereza was first mentioned in the early 17th century. During the Russian Revolution of 1905 there was an uprising against the landlords of the village, and prior to the 1917 Russian Revolution a church was sold to the village by the neighbouring village of Makove.

The Russian Soviet Federative Socialist Republic occupied the village in January 1918. In 1924 a kolkhoz was established in the village, named Zaporozhets.

A memorial to the victims of the Holodomor was installed in the village in 2006. There is also a memorial to Soviet soldiers who died during World War II.

== Notable people ==
- Oleksii Bohdanovych, Ukrainian actor
- Oksana Slipushko, Ukrainian writer and professor of Ukrainian literature
- Pavlo Sokyra, Ukrainian bandurist
