= Osovcy (air base) =

Airport in Byaroza, Belarus

Osovcy
- Byaroza, Brest Region in Belarus
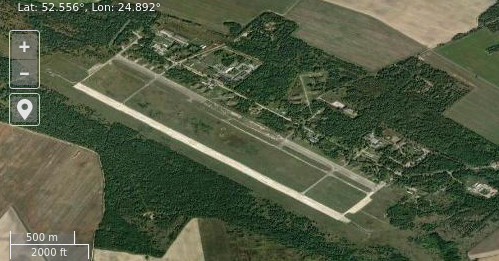
- Satellite imagery of Osovcy air base

Site information
- Owner: Ministry of Defence of the Republic of Belarus
- Operator: Air Force and Air Defence Forces of the Republic of Belarus

Location
- Shown within Belarus
- Coordinates: 52°33′20″N 24°53′30″E

Site history
- In use: c1915 - present

Airfield information
- Identifiers: ICAO: UMMO
- Elevation: 183 metres (600 ft) AMSL
Runways
Direction	Length and surface
13/31	1,075 metres (3,527 ft) Concrete

Osovcy (official transliteration: Asaŭcy) is an air base of the Air Force and Air Defence Forces of the Republic of Belarus located in Byaroza, Brest Region, Belarus. Bereza (Osovcy) is 7 km NW of Byaroza. Alternate given coordinates are 52° 33.4' N 24° 52.8' E.

The airfield is one of the oldest in Soviet/Russian aviation history. Mentions of it date back to 1915, when a separate combat detachment was based at the airfield, consisting of two aircraft "Ilya Muromets" from the 4th aviation company based at the airfield Lida. The detachment operated jointly with the Imperial 3rd Army from February 1915 and, in addition to Bereza, was also based at airfields in Brest-Litovsk and Slutsk.

By September 10, 1915, Bereza-Kartuzskaya (the name of the city was Bereza (Birch) until 1940) was occupied by the Germans. The combat detachment of Ilya Muromets aircraft flew to Slutsk, from where it continued to bomb enemy positions in Bereza Kartuzskaya, Skobelevsky camp, Baranovichi and nearby railway stations. A German aviation detachment was relocated to Bereza, equipped with Albatros D.I aircraft.

As part of the forward air defence forces during Operation Bagration in 1944, as part of the 14th Air Defence Corps, the 927th IAP, located at Loshitsa airfield particularly distinguished itself. The regiment was commanded by Hero of the Soviet Union, Lieutenant-Colonel N. Kozlov (later major-general of aviation, deputy commander of the 2nd independent Air Defence Army).

The 927th Kenigsbergskiy Red Banner order of Aleksandr Nevskiy Fighter Aviation Regiment (IAP) (Military Unit Number 55782) arrived from Strasshof in Austria to the base in 1955, when it was flying Mikoyan-Gurevich MiG-15 (Western ASCC codenamed "Fagot.") From 1962 the regiment was reequipped with the Mikoyan-Gurevich MiG-21 (ASCC "Fishbed.")

In December 1963, the 89th separate corrective and reconnaissance Novgorod orders of Suvorov and Kutuzov squadron was disbanded. Part of the squadron's servicemen was transferred to the 510th separate division of unmanned reconnaissance aircraft, which was being formed, armed with single-use reconnaissance Lavochkin La-17R (TBR-1) Unmanned aerial vehicles. In September 1966, the 510th separate division of unmanned reconnaissance aircraft was renamed the 106th separate squadron of unmanned reconnaissance aircraft. In September 1987, the 106th Squadron was relocated to the Carpathian Military District, where it was disbanded.

The 120th Fighter Aviation Regiment began forming as part of the Soviet military buildup in response to tensions with China on 24 September 1969. Initially formed at Osovtsy, the regiment was part of the 26th Air Army of the Belorussian Military District. The 1st Aviation Squadron was formed from pilots of the 927th and 968th IAPs of the 26th Air Army, while the 2nd and 3rd Aviation Squadrons were formed from pilots transferred from other Air Force units and recent graduates of flying schools. Under the command of Lieutenant Colonel Solomon Zeltser, it was equipped with the Mikoyan-Gurevich MiG-21S. Following the completion of its formation in late 1970, the 120th IAP was relocated to Domna in the Transbaikal Military District in July 1971 in order to strengthen the Soviet air component on the border with China, its pilots making the flight in their aircraft.

The 927th Fighter Aviation Koenigsberg Red Banner Order of Alexander Nevsky Regiment, permanently based at the airfield, reequipped with MiG-19 supersonic fighters in 1956. In 1960, after the disbandment of the 330th IAD, it was transferred to the 95th Fighter Aviation Division of the 26th Air Army, retrained for aircraft MiG-21. On February 23, 1968, by the Decree of the Presidium of the Supreme Soviet of the USSR, the regiment was awarded the Order of the Red Banner. In 1986, the regiment was re-equipped with MiG-29 fighters. In 1989 it became a separate regiment of the 26th Air Army.

Apart from a year deploying to the Soviet war in Afghanistan, to Kokandy and Bagram Air Base from June 1983 to July 1984, the 927th Fighter Aviation Regiment has been located at Bereza-Osovcy ever since. While in Afghanistan it would have been attached to the 34th Mixed Aviation Corps (ru:34-й смешанный авиационный корпус). It flew the Mikoyan MiG-29 (ASCC "Fulcrum") from 1986, until its changeover to unmanned aerial vehicles. From 1988-89, it was a separate regiment part of the 26th Air Army. In 1992 it became part of the Armed Forces of Belarus. In 1993, the regiment was reorganized into the 927th Fighter Aviation Base of the Belarusian Air Force. On August 24, 2010, the base was transformed into the 927th Center for the preparation and use of unmanned aerial systems of the Air Force of the Republic of Belarus. It now flies Irkut-3s and Irkut-10s.

The 5th Guards Fighter Aviation Regiment had been stationed at Sármellék, with Mikoyan-Gurevich MiG-21 fighter aircraft, part of the Southern Group of Forces in Hungary. It was disbanded in October 1990, with aircraft and crews being withdrawn to Byaroza (Osovcy).
