= Byaroza district =

District of Brest region, Belarus

Byaroza district Бярозаўскі раён (Belarusian) Берёзовский район (Russian)
- District
- Flag Coat of arms

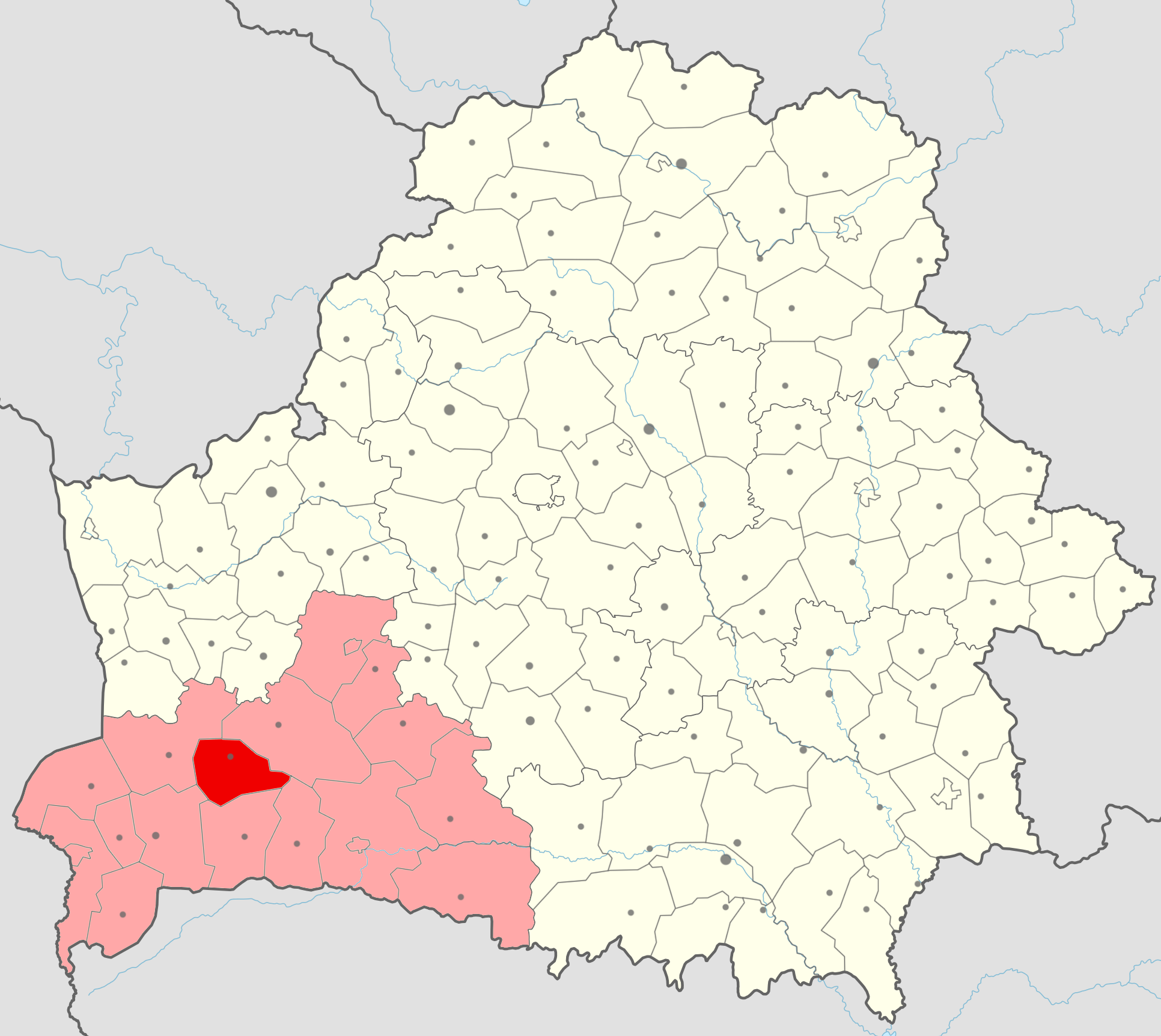
- Coordinates: 52°31′58″N 24°58′39″E
- Country: Belarus
- Region: Brest Region
- Formed: 1940
- Administrative center: Byaroza

Government
  - Chairman: Vyacheslav Metlitsky

Area
  - District: 1,405.74 km^{2} (542.76 sq mi)

Population (2024)
  - District: 57,767
  - Density: 41.094/km^{2} (106.43/sq mi)
  - Urban: 39,360
  - Rural: 18,407
- Time zone: UTC+3 (MSK)
- Website: bereza.brest-region.gov.by

Byaroza district or Biaroza district (Belarusian: Бярозаўскі раён; Russian: Берёзовский район) is a district (raion) of Brest region in Belarus. Its administrative center is Byaroza. The district is located in the northwest of the historical region of Polesia. As of 2024, it has a population of 57,767.

== History ==
The district was formed in 1940 after the Soviet annexation of Western Belarus.

Bronna Góra was the site of mass killings during the German occupation of the region.

In 1958–1967 the Byaroza hydroelectric power station was built. The town of Byelaazyorsk was built for the power station workers in 1958.

There are two biological reserves in the district near the villages of Sporava and Buslowka.

== Demographics ==
At the time of the 2009 Belarusian census, Byaroza district had a population of 66,988. Of these, 90.8% were of Belarusian, 5.7% Russian, 1.8% Ukrainian and 1.0% Polish ethnicity. 61.7% spoke Belarusian and 36.2% Russian as their native language. In 2023, it had a population of 58,350.

== Economics ==
There are industry enterprises in the raion producing agricultural products, ceramics, construction materials, textiles.

In Bronnaya Gora is the 46th Arsenal of the Armed Forces of Belarus. Since 1940, the 1483rd Main Ammunition Depot and the 843rd District Ammunition Depot were located there. In 1945, a Central Ammunition Base of the Soviet Main Artillery Directorate was relocated here from Moscow Oblast, which in 1960 was transformed into the 46th arsenal of rockets and ammunition.

An important railway branch connecting Brest and Minsk goes through the Byaroza district. Its main railway stations are Byaroza-Kartuzskaya, Bronnaya Hara and Byelaazyorsk.

== Places of interest ==
- Orthodox Charnyakawskaya church of St. Nicholas (1725)
- Carthusian monastery ruins, Byaroza
- Homestead of the Puslowski family in Pyeski, 19th century
- Roman Catholic Church of St. Virgin Mary, Sihnyevichy (1795)
- Chernoye Lake (tenth the largest lake in Belarus)

== Notable people ==
- Aleś Razanaŭ (1947–2021) – Belarusian writer, poet and translator.
