= Byaroza =

Town in Brest Region, Belarus

Byaroza Бяроза (Belarusian) Берёза (Russian)
- Town
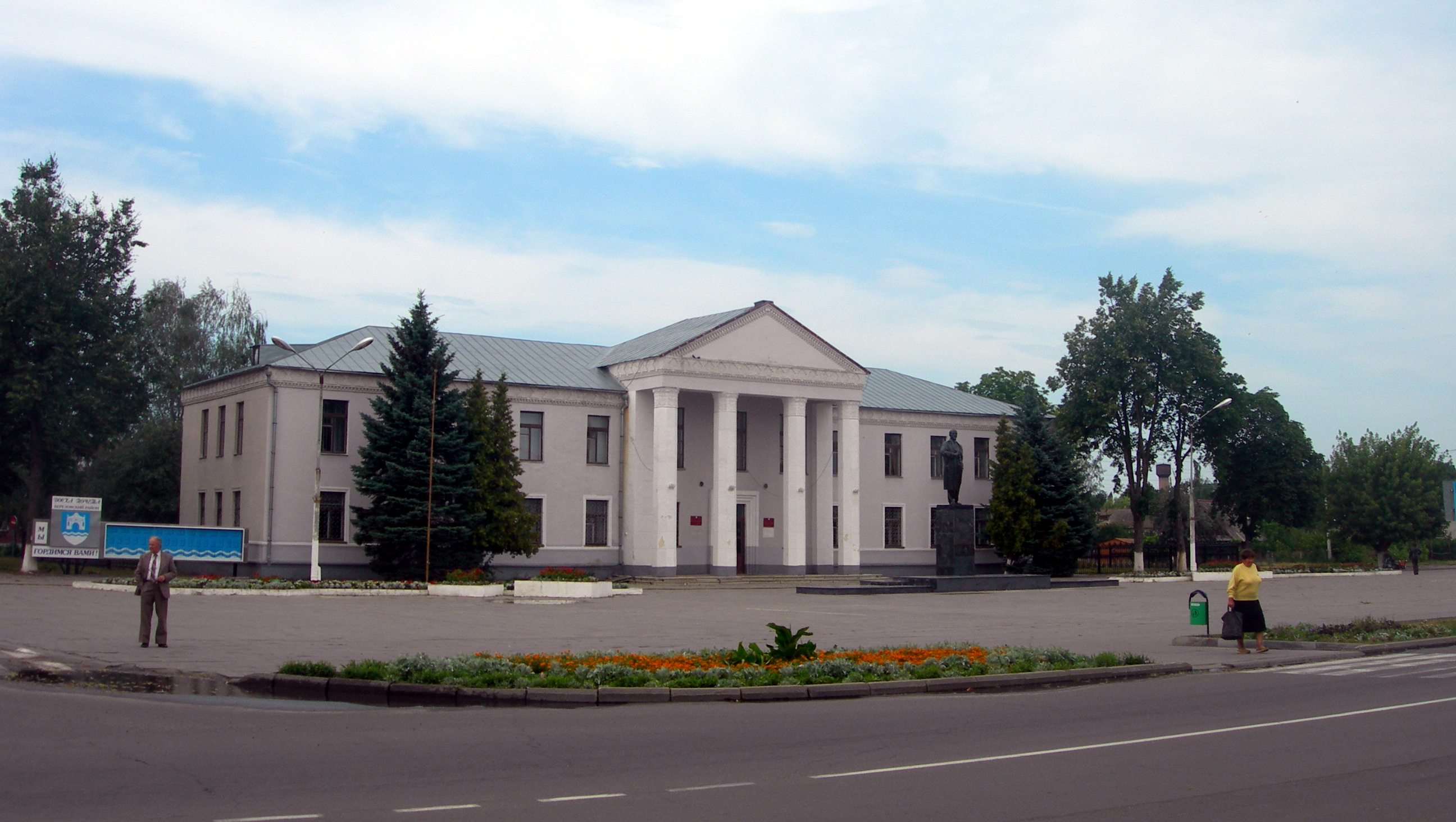
- Town hall

- Flag Coat of arms

- Location in Belarus
- Coordinates: 52°33′N 24°58′E
- Country: Belarus
- Region: Brest Region
- District: Byaroza District
- First mentioned: 1477

Area
  - Total: 43.3 km^{2} (16.7 sq mi)

Population (2026)
  - Total: 27,986
  - Density: 646/km^{2} (1,670/sq mi)
- Time zone: UTC+3 (MSK)
- Postal code: 225210
- Area code: +375 1643
- License plate: 1
- Website: Official website (in Russian)

Byaroza (Belarusian: Бяро́за, romanized: Biaroza; Russian: Берёза, romanized: Beryoza; also spelled Bereza, local pronunciation: [beˈrɛzɐ]), formerly Byaroza-Kartuzskaya, (Note: Belarusian: Бяро́за-Карту́зская; Russian: Берёза-Карту́зская; Polish: Bereza Kartuska; Yiddish: קאַרטוז־בערעזע, romanized: Kartùz-Bereze) is a town in Brest Region, in western Belarus. It serves as the administrative center of Byaroza District. As of 2026, it has a population of 27,986.

== History ==
The village of Biaroza (meaning birch) was first mentioned in 1477 as part of the Slonim County. In the 15th century, the village probably received the town charter. Between 1538 and 1600 it was an important centre of Calvinism. Later the town became the private property of the Radziwiłł family. Administratively, it was located in the Brest Litovsk Voivodeship in the Grand Duchy of Lithuania and Polish–Lithuanian Commonwealth.

=== In the Polish–Lithuanian Commonwealth ===
In the 17th century, the village belonged to Sapieha family, who founded a fortified monastery and a palace here. In 1648, the monastery was presented to the Carthusian monks. They came from the Italian town of Treviso and settled here. In gratitude for this deed, Pope Alexander VII granted the title of a prince to Lew Sapieha. The monastery was also expanded and became one of the biggest charterhouses (Carthusian monasteries) in the Polish–Lithuanian Commonwealth. The Carthusian order gave its name to the second part of the town's name in the form in which it was used until the late 1940s: Biaroza-Kartuzskaya (Polish: Bereza Kartuska).

During the Great Northern War, in 1706, the monastery housed a conference held by King Augustus II of Poland and Tsar Peter I of Russia. In 1706, the fortified monastery was put under siege and then taken by assault and looted by the forces of Charles XII of Sweden. Two years later, the Swedish forces looted the area again, which resulted in almost total depopulation of the town. It was also damaged by the armies of Alexander Suvorov in 1772, during the Partitions of Poland.

=== Under Russian rule ===
Byaroza monastery, a 19th-century drawing by Napoleon Orda

As a result of the Third Partition of Poland, in 1795, the town and the monastery were incorporated into the Russian Empire, which administered it as part of the Pruzhansky Uyezd of Grodno Governorate. After the November Uprising of 1831 the town was captured by the Russian armies and then looted. The monastery was closed by tsarist authorities and in 1866, after the January Uprising, the whole complex was partially demolished, and the bricks were used for construction of a Russian prison and barracks nearby. The baroque church was destroyed in 1868. After the uprising, the town became a part of the so-called Pale of Settlement and was repopulated with Jews expelled from other areas of the Russian Empire. As of 1878, the town had a population of 2,507, of which Jews constituted 44.4%.

In 1842, a new road was opened between Moscow and Warsaw and passed through the town, which started a period of economic prosperity. In 1871, a Warsaw-Moscow railroad was laid only 20 miles (32 kilometres) from the town, connecting the town with the nearby major cities of Brest and Minsk. In 1878, the town had a marketplace, 7 streets and approximately 200 houses. Apart from the Catholic and Uniate Churches, there was also a synagogue, Jewish baths and a market just outside the city limits.

=== In the 20th century ===
In 1915, during the First World War, the town was occupied by the Imperial Germany and in 1918 claimed by the short-lived Belarusian People's Republic. The town was captured by the Red Army on January 19, 1919, during the Soviet westward offensive of 1918–19 (Target-Vistula). Within one month, the Polish Army advanced into the area and captured the town on February 14, 1919. During the Polish–Soviet War the town became a notable location of two major battles including the war's very first and the second Battle of Bereza Kartuska (1920). At the end of the Polish–Soviet War the town was ceded to Poland in the Peace of Riga signed by Soviet Russia (acting also on behalf of Soviet Belarus) on 18 March 1921. The peace treaty remained in force until the Soviet invasion of Poland in 1939.

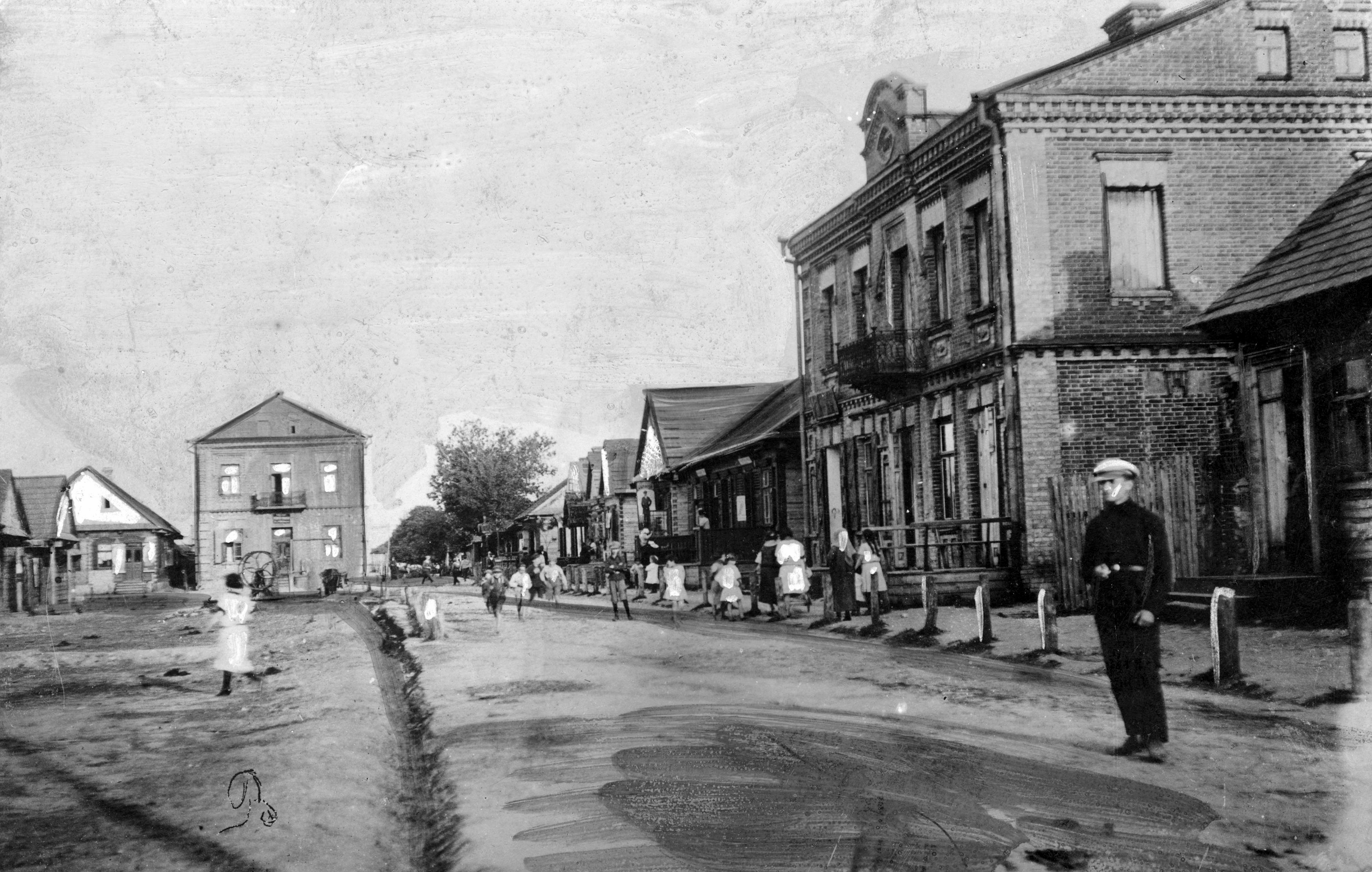
Bereza Kartuska in the interwar period

Within the Second Polish Republic, the town was administratively located in the Prużana County in the Polesie Voivodeship. In 1939, town limits were expanded by including the village of Nowosiółki.

==== Polish prison ====
A Polish political prison camp was created in Bereza Kartuska in 1934. The former Russian barracks and prison were turned into an internment camp for both Polish right-wing extremists from the ONR, Ukrainian separatists from the Organization of Ukrainian Nationalists and members of the Communist Party of Poland and the Communist Party of Western Ukraine, and later also for members of opposition parties, journalists critical of the government and people suspected of common crimes. Inmates were sent there for up to three months without the involvement of the courts, based solely on the administrative decision of the police or the voivode. In this way, many Belarusians who resisted Polonization found themselves in the Bereza Kartuska camp.

The legal basis for the camp opening was openly questioned and its existence was often criticized by opponents of the Sanacja movement, which from its inception called it a "concentration camp". The camp was closed in September 1939, during the invasion of Poland.

==== World War II ====
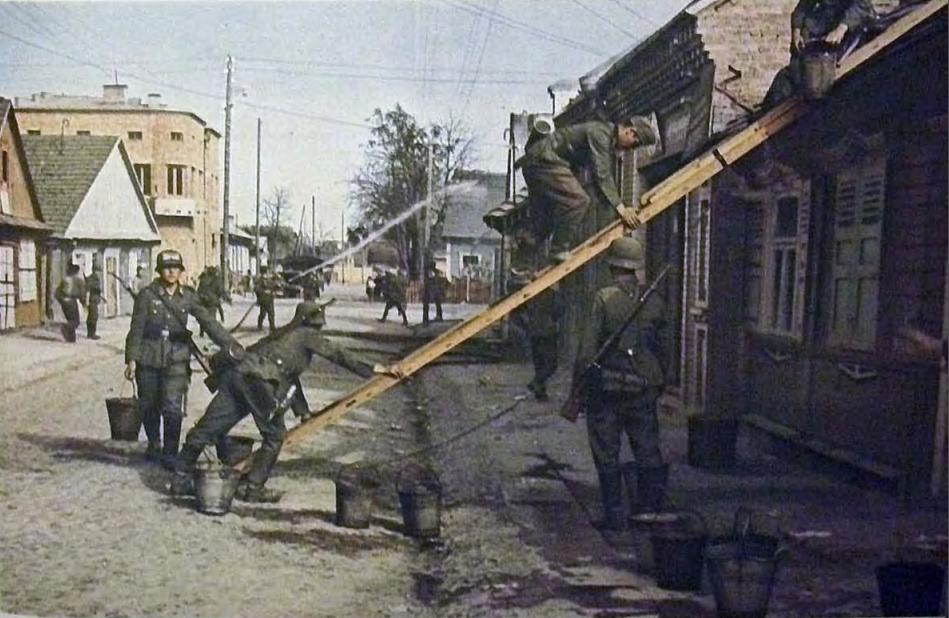
Bereza Kartuska in 1941

During the German-Soviet invasion of Poland, which started World War II in September 1939, the town was captured by the Red Army and incorporated into the Byelorussian SSR. After the outbreak of the German-Soviet War, the town was captured by the German Army on 23 June 1941. The German occupation lasted until 15 July 1944. During this time, Byaroza was administered as a part of Generalbezirk Wolhynien und Podolien of Reichskommissariat Ukraine.

Under German occupation, a ghetto was created in the town for Jews who fled there from the surrounding areas. Under the Nazi German occupying administration — which had merged Byaroza, along with most of western Polesia, into the Reichskommissariat Ukraine — more than 8,000 people were killed in mass executions or were starved to death.

Polish and Soviet partisans were active in the area around Byaroza. The Polish resistance organized sabotage actions, disrupting German military transports. Red Army troops recaptured the town on 15 July 1944. It was eventually annexed from Poland in 1945.

==== Post-war period ====
Repopulated with Belarusian and Russian peasants, the town was rebuilt after the destruction of World War II. After a minor building materials factory was opened in the town, another period of fast growth followed.

During the postwar period a Soviet Frontal Aviation base, Osovcy was close to Biaroza.

In 1958-1967 a hydroelectric power station was built in the Biaroza Raion.

In 1991, after the dissolution of the USSR, the town became part of the independent Republic of Belarus.

== Mayors ==
- Berl (Dov) Ribak (1882–1915)
- Naftali Levinson (1915–1919 acting, 1919–1939?)

=== Heads of Biaroza District Executive Committee ===
- Yury Narkevich (2005–2016)
- Leanid Martyniuk (since 2016)

== Landmarks ==
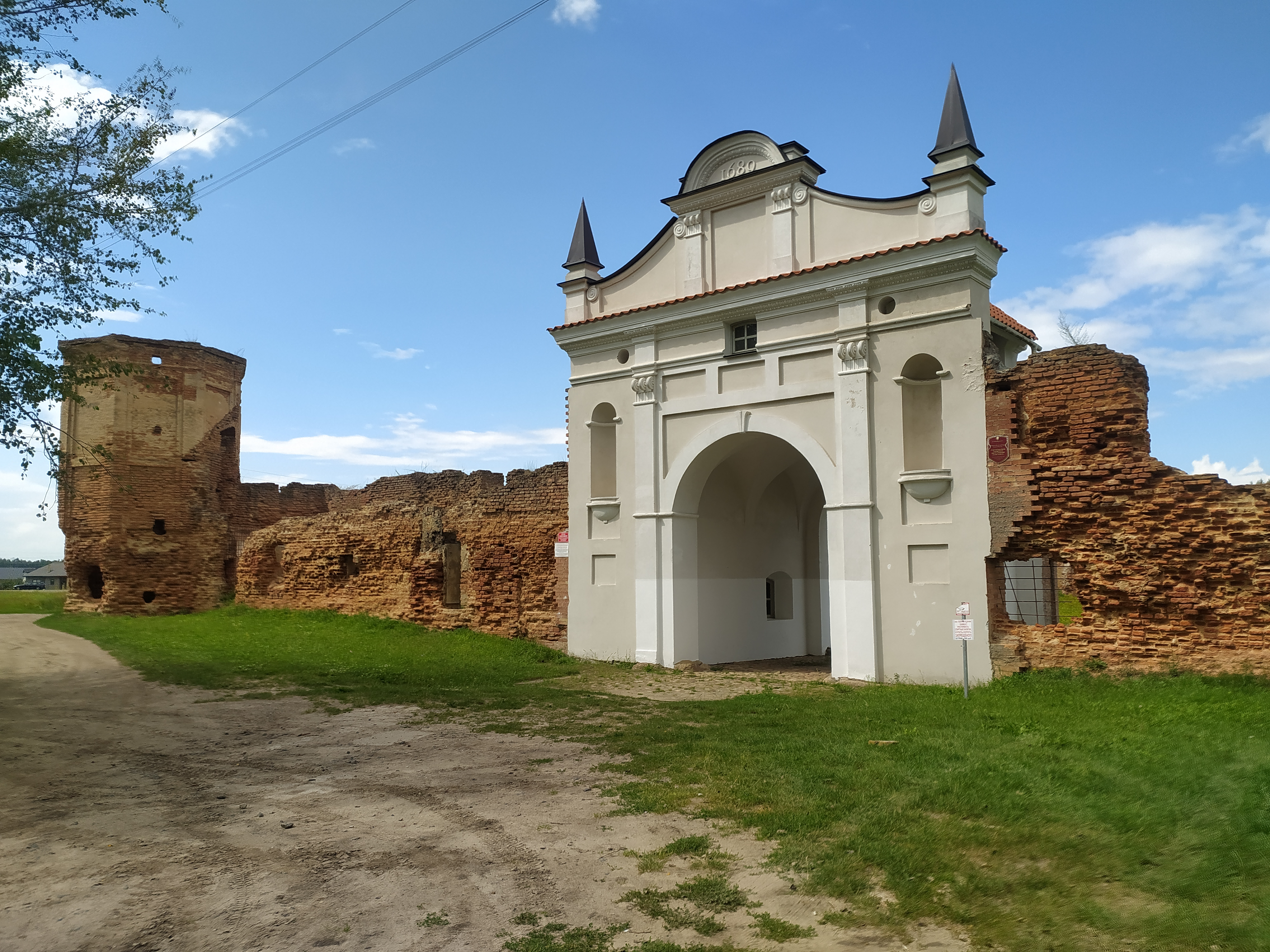
Entrance gate to the Carthusian monastery

Although the 17th-century monastery was mostly destroyed in the 19th century, there are some ruins remaining. Among them are:

- Historical gateway with a decorative façade
- Parts of fortifications surrounding the monastery with several towers partially preserved
- Ruins of the octagonal church tower
- Ruins of the hospital
- Several buildings later incorporated into the tsarist prison.

== Notable people ==
- Jakob Klatzkin (1882–1948), Jewish philosopher
- Kadia Molodowsky (1894–1975), Jewish poet and writer
- Kseniya Koçyiğit (born 1986), Belarusian-born Azerbaijani professional volleyball player

== See also ==
- Battle of Bereza Kartuska

== Bibliography ==
- Vándor, Károly. "Légierő társbérletben I-II, Vpp Kiadó, 2009-2010, Dunakeszi".
