= List of arsenals of the Russian Armed Forces =

Arsenals of the Armed Forces of the Russian Federation are military units for the manufacture, repair and store weapons and military equipment.

== Arsenals in cities ==
The arsenal in Ulyanovsk is among the most dangerous military arsenals located within Russian cities. Many arsenal detonations and fires have occurred since the 1990s, reportedly often because fires are set to cover large-scale theft.

A major series of explosions occurred at an arms depot of the 31st Arsenal of the Caspian Flotilla near Ulyanovsk on 13 November 2009. At least two people were killed in the explosion and 43 were rescued from a bomb shelter where they had taken refuge.

Other arsenals that are within the cities of Russia, which are threats to inhabitants by either accidental detonations or Ukrainian attacks and which the public wish to have removed from the city limits:

- Northern Arsenal of the Ministry of Defence of the Russian Federation, Murmansk, Murmansk Oblast
- Far Eastern Arsenal - 690920 Vladivostok, Russky settlement (Russky Island?), Cape Shigina, 6. Postal address: 690065, Primorsky Krai, Vladivostok, Sipyagina St., 21.
- 5th Arsenal, probably V/Ch 62033 - Alatyr, Chuvash Republic (Chuvashia)
- 11th Arsenal of the Navy, Military Unit Number (V/Ch or в/ч) 31353, Yoshkar-Ola-27 p. Babak, Mari El. There are two arsenals in the Yoshkar-Ola area, the other being the 116th. The 116th Arsenal became part of OAO Oboronservis / Remvooruzhenie.
- 15th Arsenal of the Navy, в/ч 69233, с 2010 в/ч 81263 - Bolshaya Izhora, Lomonosovsky District of Leningrad Oblast
- 18th Arsenal of the Navy - St. Petersburg
- 31st Arsenal of the Ministry of Defence, в/ч 34236, - Military Town No. 26, Ulyanovsk Ulyanovsk Oblast - Central Warehouse of the Navy 2004; 31st Arsenal from 1946. Now possibly reduced/disbanded.
- 39th Arsenal, V/Ch 74085 - Perm-2 v / g 1 "kr. Barracks" Perm, Perm Krai
- 55th Arsenal, V/Ch 41710, - "Rzhev-9" (Sklad-40) S. Monchalovo, Tver Oblast
- 59th Arsenal, V/Ch 42697, Moscow Oblast - Babushkin, Moscow, Moscow Oblast
- 60th Arsenal of the Ministry of Defence - Kaluga, Kaluga Oblast
- 63rd Arsenal of the Ministry of Defence - Lipetsk Lipetsk Region
- 75th Arsenal, V/Ch 42708 - Serpukhov-4 Moscow Oblast ш,60, Air Defence Troops of the Russian Ground Forces. Raised to arsenal status 1962. The plant was founded in 1949 as repair plant No. 185 of the Main Artillery Directorate of the Armed Forces for the repair of radio-technical weapons in accordance with a directive of the General Staff of the Armed Forces of the USSR. Then, in September 1962, the 45th military base became part of the plant. In accordance with the order of the Commander of the Missile Forces and Artillery of September 16, 1962, the 185th radar weapons repair plant was renamed into the 75th Artillery Arsenal, and since February 2010 - into the 75th Arsenal OJSC.
- 103rd Arsenal, V/Ch 42701 - 430004, Republic of Mordovia, Saransk-4, Mordovskaya str., 35. Deals with automated control systems. Stations and points for reconnaissance and control of artillery and anti-aircraft artillery fire; command and observation vehicles (KNM) for weapons (fire) control. Radar stations, units, radar identification equipment. Diesel and multi-fuel engines.Observation and observation devices and their components. Lasers. Means and technical devices for the creation of radio-electronic.
- 116th Arsenal, possibly V/Ch 67708 - Krasnooktabrsky, Medvedevsky District, Mari El
- 118th Arsenal of the Navy, V/Ch 53140 - Novosibirsk-95 p. Pashin, Ulitsa Flotska, Novosibirsk Oblast
- 7080th Centre for Artillery Weapons and Ammunition(?) of the Navy (центр АВ и БП) (в/ч 81269, 152291, пос. Некрасовское (с. Burmakino-1, Yaroslav-55), Nekrasovskiy Raion, Yaroslavl Oblast), formerly ФГУП "6 арсенал ВМФ МО РФ" (в/ч 09919);
- 7081st Technical Base for Weapons of the Navy, V/Ch 81272, 663604, Kansk Krasnoyarsk Territory, Ulitsa Gertsena–9. Former 10th Arsenal of the Navy of the Ministry of Defence. In 1946, Central Warehouse 2040 of the Navy was renamed the 5th Naval (morskoi) Arsenal of central subordination. In 1948, the 5th Naval Arsenal was renamed the 10th Naval (morskoi) Arsenal of the VMF with the Military Unit Number (в/ч) 78309. Deals with mine trawls; components of ship, boat, aviation mines, mine systems, mine devices and equipment; components of ship and aircraft torpedoes, anti-torpedoes, high-speed underwater missiles, anti-submarine missiles; buoys; special equipment for maintenance, testing, checking the serviceability and repair of torpedoes, anti-torpedoes, high-speed submarine missiles, anti-submarine missiles; depth charges and sea mines; unguided missiles, and rockets.

== Arsenals 12 GU MO RF ==
Arsenals of the 12th Chief Directorate of the Ministry of Defence of Russia were inherited from a Soviet defence ministry chief directorate. They store nuclear weapons for all types of the Armed Forces of the Russian Federation, and in the past the USSR.

== Arsenals of GRAU ==
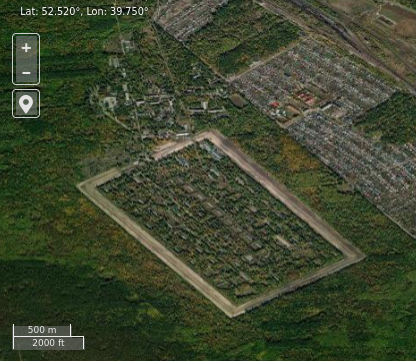
Satellite imagery of the (former) 63rd Arsenal of the GRAU at Lipetsk, now a Central Rocket-Artillery Base.

Arsenals of the Main Missile and Artillery Directorate of the Ministry of Defence:

- 6th Arsenal (ii) of the GRAU, в/ч 55487, 682612 Khabarovsk Krai, Amursky District, Elban (Эльбан-2) settlement. Previously the 14th Arsenal. Second formation of 6th Arsenal; first formation now the Nekrasovskoye site (above).
- 7th Arsenal, V/Ch 42228. 676875, Завитинский р-н, Zavitinsk, ул. Озерная), Amur Oblast. Seemingly the former 112th Arsenal, which was located in the same place with the same V/Ch in the 1980s.
- 8th "Order of the Red Star" Arsenal of GRAU, Military Unit Number (V/Ch) в/ч 55443-СГ, Maxim Gorky Street, Rybinsk, 152918, Yaroslavl Oblast; Formerly в/ч 41686. Affiliated with the Navy and the 1060th Centre for Material-Technical Support, Leningrad Military District.
- 13th Arsenal of GRAU, V/Ch 64531, Kotovo, Okulovsky District, Novgorod Oblast, a settlement in Kotovskoye Settlement of Okulovsky District It is located about 100 km east of Veliki Novgorod. It has a total area of about 3 km2. It is about 680 km from the Ukrainian border. Kommersant-Vlast 2005 gave a different location nearby. (58°28′55″N 33°30′18″E)
- 20th Arsenal of GRAU, V/Ch 40951, 682030, Khabarovsk Krai, Verkhnebureinsky District, Chegdomyn settlement, Mira avenue, 3.
- 23rd Arsenal of GRAU, V/Ch 71628, (в/ч 71628, 172841, Tver Oblast, p. Октябрьский, Ok. Toropets-1 / Art. Staraya Toropa); Strategic Rocket Forces 1952–58; in April 1958 transferred to GAU.
- 42nd Arsenal of GRAU, V/Ch 67877 - Bagrationovsk Art. Ladushkin, Kaliningrad Oblast
- 51st Arsenal GRAU, V/Ch 11785, Barsovo, Kirzhachsky District, Vladimir Oblast. The arsenal, holding weapons of the Russian Missile Troops and Artillery, occupies an area of 502 hectares (3.5 km^{2}), with a perimeter of 8.4 km. Its storage capacity is said to be 105,300 tons of ammunition in 45 individual storage facilities and 30 open-air ammunition storage areas. On 22 April 2025, the arsenal suffered an explosion followed by fires. and 450 residents were evacuated from nearby towns.
- 53rd Arsenal of GRAU, V/Ch 64469, "Dzerzhinsk-38," Yuganets, Nizhny Novgorod Oblast
- 54th Arsenal of GRAU, V/Ch 32358, "Bologoe-5" Kuzuzhenkino-1 Tver Oblast
- 60th Arsenal of GRAU, V/Ch 86283, (former V/Ch 42702) - Kaluga-32, Ulitsa Gvardeiskaya, 21, "906 base," Kaluga Oblast. Raised to arsenal status 1960. Formed as Military Warehouse No. 906, May 1940. On September 30, 1943, the unit (warehouse) was transferred to Kaluga. Its task was to supply the Red Army fronts with ammunition. From September 1943 to May 1945 alone, 5,340 wagons of artillery and mortar rounds were collected and 6,200 ammunition wagons were sent to the troops. In August 1960, the base was retitled the 60th Arsenal of the GRAU.” The now Open Joint Stoxk Company "60 Arsenal" repairs and maintains anti-aircraft Buk missile system, 2K12 Kub systems, combat vehicle 9AZZBM2 (BMZ), detection radar P-19 "Dunai", carries out major repairs of gas turbine engines 9I56, 9I57, DG4M, 2PV8 of various series, and power supply systems of surface-to-air missile systems.
- 63rd Arsenal GRAU, V/Ch 11700, "Lipetsk-29" Lipetsk Oblast, from 2010 260th Central Missile-Artillery Base (V/Ch 86295)
- 67th Arsenal of GRAU, V/Ch 55443-BK (-41), (former V/Ch 92919), Karachev Bryansk Oblast, approximately 114 km from the Ukrainian border. The depot was attacked by Ukrainian drones in October 2024. Fires, explosions and continuous detonations for hours resulted, but initial battle damage assessment has not yet been made by independent military analysts. Two ammunition depot storage warehouses were destroyed.
- 68th Arsenal of GRAU, V/Ch 30148, Mozdok Art. Lukovskaya North Ossetia
- 70th Arsenal of GRAU, V/Ch 58661-BB (-48) (earlier V/Ch 92922), village Kedrovka, Sverdlovsk Oblast
- 72nd Arsenal of the GRAU (в/ч 59313–71, former V/Ch 63292 until December 2015.) Ul. Volochaevskaya, 30, village (st.) of Taltsy, belonging to Oktyabrsky City District, Ulan-Ude, 670019, the Republic of Buryatia. Near the village of Sosnovy Bor.
- 73rd Arsenal of GRAU, V/Ch 11931, Ul. Centralnaya 149, Esino settlement, Kovrovsky District, Vladimir Oblast, named "Kovrov-31".
- 74th Arsenal of the Main Command of the Air Forces (в/ч 21220, 157040, Buy, Kostroma Oblast);
- 80th Arsenal of GRAU, V/Ch 86791 - Gagarskaya, Beloyarsky Raion, Sverdlovsk Oblast (Yekat-56)
- 93rd Arsenal of GRAU, V/Ch 68586 (554443-TD) "Bologoe-4" Kuzuzhkino-2 Tver region <!-57°41′21″N 33°58′46″E->>
- 97th Arsenal of GRAU, V/Ch 86741 "Skopin-51"
- 100th Arsenal of GRAU, military unit 55486, 157330, Kostroma Oblast, Neya
- 101st Arsenal of GRAU, V/Ch 55448, "Inz-40" Glotovka Ulyanovsk Oblast
- 102nd Arsenal of GRAU, V/Ch 86696 - Malaya Purga, Pugachevo, Udmurtia - During the explosion on June 2, 2011, two-thirds of the storage areas were destroyed. The arsenal was beyond repair. The issue of its closure was considered. After the fire in 2011, the arsenal was disbanded, its facilities were [to be] transferred to a specialized enterprise. Subsequent fires and explosions in 2013, 2015, 2016, and May 2018.
- 107th Arsenal GRAU, V/Ch 55443-TT (former V/Ch 11777), Toropets-2, (172842, Nelidovo, Nelidovsky District, Tver Oblast. On the night of 17–18 September 2024, after the 2022 Russian invasion of Ukraine had begun, Ukraine launched a large attack on the arsenal, causing repeated large explosions and serious damage.
- 109th Arsenal of GRAU, V/Ch 63792 - Irkutsk-37. Battery Central, 10 Irkutsk Oblast
- Kotluban Arsenal (GRAU arsenal V/Ch 57229–51) in Kotluban, Volgograd Oblast, located 40 kilometers from Volgograd. On the night of November 16, 2023, at about 01:00, a fire broke at the storage site near the village of Kotluban. The fire was only extinguished at about 5 a.m. Russian media wrote that more than 600 people were evacuated from the territory of the military unit, including three children. A second Ukrainian missile attack occurred on the night of 11–12 February 2026 causing explosions and fires. Russian authorities acknowledged the fire, but said Russian air defense forces had repelled the missile attack and the fire was caused by "falling debris." Residents of the city of Kotluban were evacuated.
- 346th Red Banner Central Artillery Base for Weapons, V/Ch 55443-VP (former в/ч 42262), 601130 Gorodishchi, Petushinsky District, Vladimir Oblast, ст. Usual. Formerly 40th Arsenal of GRAU.
- 435th Central Artillery Weapons Warehouse/Depot - Armavir, Krasnodar Territory
- 719th Artillery Ammunition Base - (military unit 01704, 352120, Krasnodar Region, Tikhoretsk, actually the settlement of Tikhonkiy)
- 744th Artillery Weapons Base (military unit 42286, 346430, Rostov Region, Novocherkassk, Pervomayskaya Street, 97)
- 1411th Artillery Ammunition Depot is located in Cobasna, Transdnestr, Moldova, under the Operational Group of Russian Forces, Moldova.

Former GRAU Arsenals:

- 2nd Arsenal of the GRAU (2-й арсенал, Military Unit 61809, Kiev, in 1993 renamed the 2nd Arsenal of the GRAU of Ukraine, military unit A2161). By the last order of the GRAU of the United Armed Forces of the Commonwealth of Independent States No 7 of January 31, 1992, Senior Lieutenant Alexander Nikitin was appointed a workshop engineer there. Ukraine disbanded the arsenal in 2005.
- 3rd Arsenal GRAU, V/Ch 47156, Bogandinsky, Tyumensky District, Tyumen Oblast. Disbanded 2014.
- 7th Arsenal GRAU (First Formation) V/Ch 61808 - Riga, Latvian Soviet Socialist Republic.
- 22nd Arsenal GRAU, V/Ch 62059, "Sizran-2" the village of Serdovino, Samara Oblast. <!-53° 8'59" N 48°->.
- 32nd Arsenal (в/ч 21223, 663820, Krasnoyarsk Krai, Нижнеингашский р-н, пос. Nizhny Ingash, хранятся R-40 (missile), KSR-5, Р- менование почему-то от 611th Fighter Aviation Regiment к 1.12.2010 должна войти.
- 50th Arsenal - in 1947, the 76th warehouse at Leonidovka, Penza District, in Penza Oblast (ru:Леонидовка (железнодорожная станция, Пензенская область) was reorganized into the 608th Central Aviation Ammunition Base. In 1983, the base was renamed the 50th Arsenal of the Air Force. In February 1998, the unit was reassigned to the Chief of the NBC Protection Troops and received the name 50th Arsenal for Storage of Chemical Weapons of the 1st Category. In 2001, Military Unit 21222 became part of the Federal Directorate for the Safe Storage and Destruction of Chemical Weapons and was named the Leonidovka Chemical Weapons Storage Facility. The depot was storing aviation chemical munitions filled with nerve agents such as sarin, Soman, and VX. The toxic agents stored there amounted to just over 17% of the total stockpiles in the Russian Federation.
- 94th Arsenal GRAU, V/Ch 63779, Omsk-99 Omsk Oblast, on December 1, 1960, the 25th Central Artillery Repair Base received its Military Unit Number, and in December 1986 it was transformed into an arsenal of the GRAU.
- 99th Arsenal of the GRAU, V/Ch 67684 - Urman, Iglinsky District, Republic of Bashkortostan - after a fire in 2011 this unit was to be disbanded on 1 September 2011.
- 120th Arsenal of GRAU, V/Ch 55443 with a suffix. Bryansk, Bryansk Oblast . Now part of 1060th Centre for Material-Technical Support. Former V/Ch 42696. The arsenal was attacked by Ukraine on 28 June 2025.
- Military Unit 10718, Radiological and Chemical Troops (РХБЗ) of the Navy, Rybinsk Bereznyaki village (Kobostovo station), Yaroslavl Oblast. Seemingly disestablished circa 2002.

== Navy ==
In addition to the Navy arsenals located in large cities, listed above, there are the:

- 14th Arsenal of the Navy (military unit 20991, 184650, Murmansk Oblast, Polyarny, Ulitsa Vidyaevo);
- 17th Arsenal of the Navy (в/ч 13189, Sevastopol, Sukharnaya gully);

== Strategic Rocket Forces ==
The 21st, 27th (Nizhny Novgorod Oblast), and 29th Arsenal are affiliated with the Strategic Rocket Forces. The 25th Arsenal in Stolbtsy, Minsk Oblast, Belorussian SSR, was also affiliated with the RSVN. The 28th Arsenal (28-й арсенал КВ РФ) in Pervomaisky, Znamenka, Znamensky District, Tambov Oblast in Tambov Oblast is affiliated with the Russian Space Forces.

== Chemical ==
By 2014 the chemical warehouses/base at Shikhany-4 had become the 115th State Special Chemical Arsenal of the RF. Now 115th Arsenal of the Radiation, Chemical and Biological Protection Troops? Shikhany-4, Saratov Oblast appears to be the location of the arsenal.

- 1207 Facility for the storage and destruction of chemical weapons (military unit 92746, aka Object 1597). Shchuchye, Shchuchye-2 village Planovy, Kurgan Oblast, Russia
- 1208 Facility for the storage and destruction of chemical weapons (V/Ch 55498), settlement of Kizner, Сосновая, Udmurt Republic); aka Object 159
- Kambarka Chemical Weapons Storage Facility, V/Ch 42727 - Kambarka, Udmurtia
