= 51st Arsenal GRAU =

Russian weapons storage depot

- Vladimir Oblast; Near Barsovo in Russia
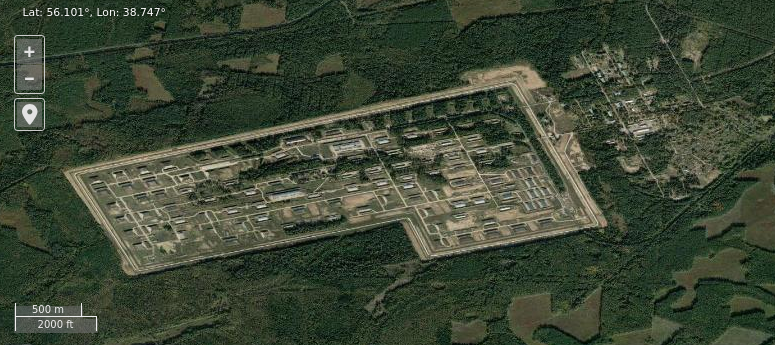
- Satellite imagery of the 51st arsenal before the April 2025 explosion

Location
- Location of 51st Arsenal GRAU within Vladimir Oblast Location of Vladimir within Europe#Location of Vladimir within Russia 51st Arsenal GRAU (Russia)
- Coordinates: 56.101466125876044°N 38.74729263195981°E

The 51st arsenal of the Main Missile and Artillery Directorate (GRAU) located in Barsovo, Kirzhachsky District, Vladimir Oblast, 70 kilometres (43 mi) northeast of Moscow, is one of the largest arsenals in Russia. It is identified by the Russian Armed Forces as Military Unit Number 55443-VD (formerly 11785).

== Characteristics ==
This arsenal of the Russian Missile Troops and Artillery occupies an area of 502 hectares (1,240 acres), with a perimeter of 8.4 kilometres (5.2 mi). Its storage capacity is estimated at 105,300 tons of ammunition in 45 individual storage facilities and 30 open-air ammunition storage areas.

In 2009, it comprised 14.2 kilometres (8.8 mi) of railways and 15.3 kilometres (9.5 mi) of roads, with a capacity of 4,286 ammunition wagons - 64 tonnes each - or more than 264,000 tonnes at its maximum. The arsenal stores a wide variety of munitions, including solid-propellant anti-aircraft and tactical ballistic missiles, multiple rocket launchers, and various types of shells. It reportedly stores munitions transferred from Belarus. It also handles their assembly (e.g., the installation of warheads on anti-tank missiles), repairs them, and disposes of them in the event of a defect. It is one of eleven critical military logistics platforms for the distribution and maintenance of munitions in European Russia, operational in 2023. In 2009, the arsenal director was a senior warrant officer receiving 22,000 rubles ($265). The civilian staff was largely female, paid 6,000 to 8,000 rubles ($72 to $96).

== History ==
The majority of the facilities were built in the 1970s and 1980s during the Soviet Union. The arsenal was listed among the GRAU's installations during the 1980s.

In 2013, it was decided to modernize the arsenal with fortified bunkers built to modern standards. However, nearly half of the 1.3 billion ruble budget was misappropriated by contractors. Work continued until 2021. Satellite images show that more than half of the buildings, including all those along the railway, were not covered with any layer of earth, but only protected by revetments. Many revetments appear to have been built only on one side of the buildings, not around them. Photos show that ammunition crates were stored in the open air.

In June 2002, four people were killed when ammunition exploded during unloading operations.

On June 28, 2022, the cell "BOAK-Vladimir" published a press release claiming sabotage action on the arsenal's railway. The rails were damaged. BOAK's press release stated, "Every stopped train helps to get rid of missiles and rockets, which could hit peaceful Ukrainian cities!"

=== Explosion on April 22, 2025 ===
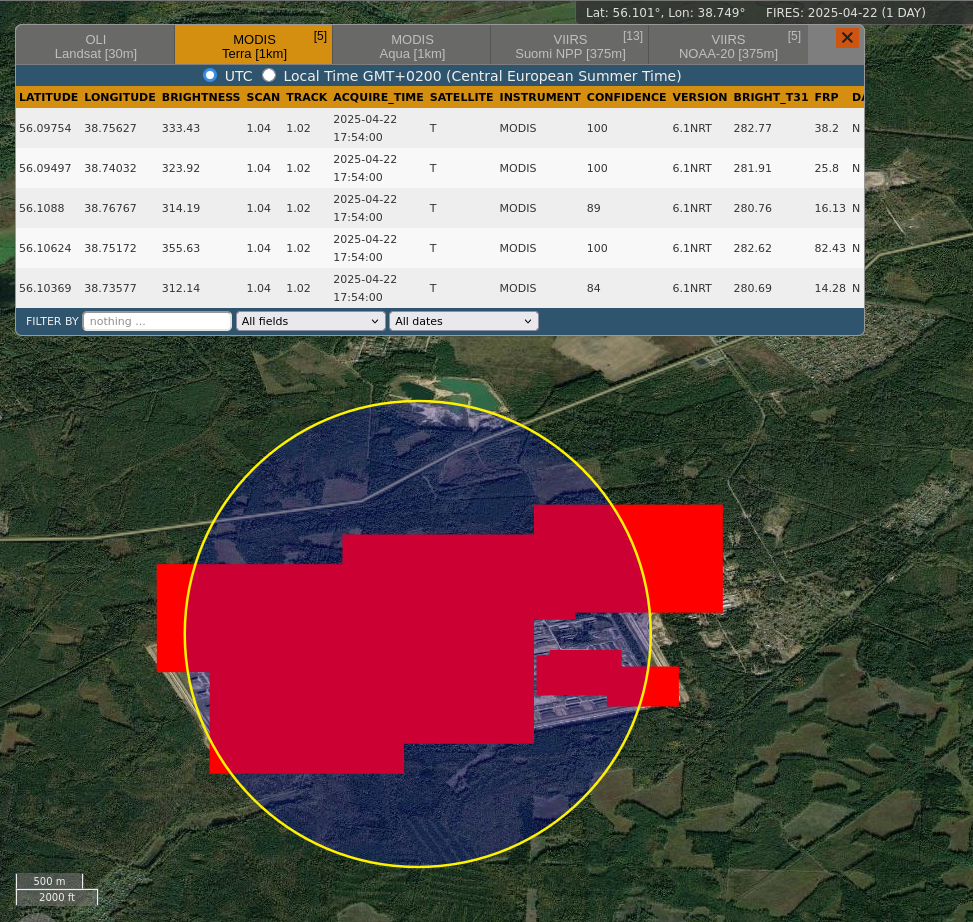
A FIRMS satellite image from April 22, 2025, shows a fire in the arsenal.

On April 22, 2025, violent explosions destroyed a square kilometer of the site while Ukraine estimates that it contained 105,000 tons of munitions. On April 23, secondary explosions continued at the arsenal. Authorities evacuated eight nearby villages and two second-home cooperatives, or approximately 450 people. Thirty-seven towns were cut off from gas supplies. The furthest evacuated town is 4.5 kilometres (2.8 mi) from the site, while the town of Kirzhach, located only 5–6 kilometres (3.1–3.7 mi) away, was not evacuated. The Russian Defence Ministry issued a statement on April 22, 2025, denying any casualties and attributing the incident to "a violation of safety regulations when handling explosive materials". Regional governor reports four injured on day of explosion. Earth observation satellites from the Fire Information for Resource Management System indicate fires until April 24, 2025. The worst-affected area of the arsenal was around the railway loading/unloading facility.

== See also ==
- Toropets depot explosions
- List of arsenals of the Russian Armed Forces
