= 1060th Centre for Material-Technical Support =

- 1060 Краснознаменного центра материально-технического обеспечения (1060 ЦМТО)
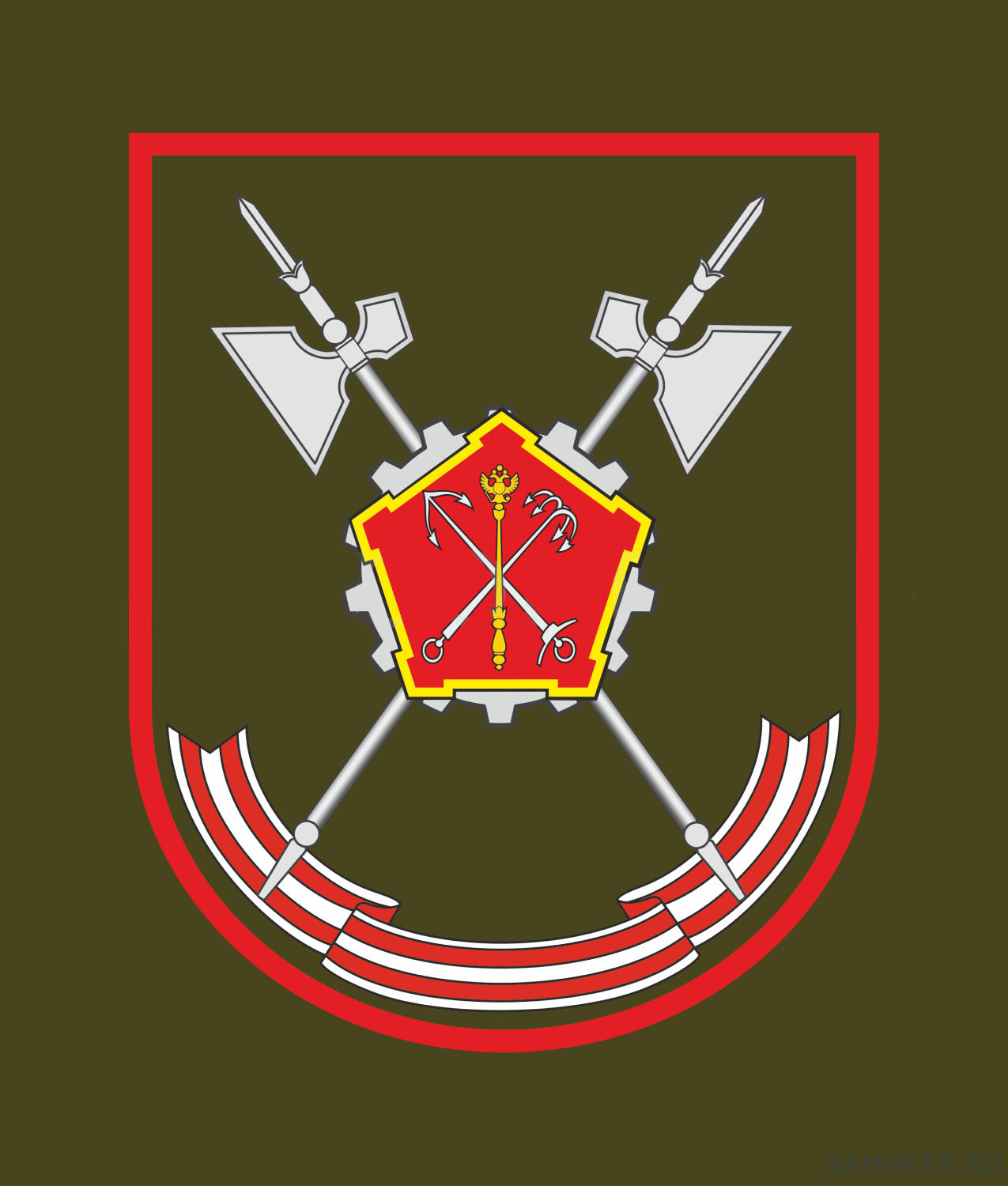
- Armsmark of the center
- Active: 2012-present
- Country: Russia
- Part of: Western Military District (2012–2024); Leningrad Military District (2024–present)
- Decorations: Order of the Red Banner

The 1060th Red Banner Center for Material-Technical Support (Russian: 1060 Краснознаменного центра материально-технического обеспечения) (1060 ЦМТО) (Military Unit Number 55443) is a unit of the Armed Forces of the Russian Federation that supervises logistical support of the Russian Ground Forces, Russian Navy and Air and Space Forces within the territories of the Leningrad Military District.

== History ==
On September 1, 2012, the 1060 Red Banner Center for Material-Technical Support was formed in the city of St. Petersburg, the city of Pushkin. It was formed in accordance with directive of the Ministry of Defence of the Russian Federation dated May 28, 2012 No. D-037 "On organizational activities held in the Western Military District in 2012." It was organised under Table of Organisation and Equipment (shtat) No. 33/023.

During the Second World War, three units of the center were awarded Battle Flags and state awards for their courage and heroism, and excellent performance of tasks:

- Arsenal (missile and artillery weapons, 1st grade), Воинская часть (Military Unit) 55443-SG — with a battle flag and the Order of the Red Star with diplomas;
- Arsenal (missile and artillery weapons, 1st rank), military unit 55443-VP — by Decree of the Presidium of the Supreme Soviet of the USSR dated March 29, 1944, the Order of the Combat Red Banner with a certificate, seemingly as 919 Military Warehouse;
- Arsenal (complex storage of rockets, ammunition and explosive materials, 2nd category) military unit 55443-НХ — Battle flag and the Order of the Red Star with diplomas.

As the units that the 1060th Centre had been formed from had been awarded Battle flags, the orders of the Red Star and the Battle Red Banner, the centre was assigned the name Red Banner when it was formed.

The 1061st Centre for Material-Technical Support was formed as the counterpart organization in the Southern Military District.

== Structure ==
- Military Unit 55443-BM, Bryansk, пр-т Московский д.10.
- Military Unit 55443-VD Barsovo formerly 51st Arsenal of the GRAU, near Kirzhach in Vladimir Oblast. Nearby railway lines attacked by partisans in June 2022.
- Military Unit 55443-VK, Kovrov-35
- Military Unit 55443-VP (formerly Military Unit No. 42262, 40th Arsenal (Gorodishchi, Petushinsky District, Vladimir Oblast).)
- Arsenal (complex storage of missiles, ammunition and explosive materials, 2nd category), military unit 55443-ЛЙ (-25) (formerly the 15th Arsenal of the Navy, military unit 69233, since 2010 7082nd Technical Mine-Torpedo Base of the Navy, 1st grade, military unit 81263), Bolshaya Izhora (Velika Izhora), Lomonosovsky District, Leningrad Oblast;
- military Unit 55443-HA
- Military Unit 55443-LS
- work unit 55443-MZh
- Central Aviation-Technical Base of Russian Naval Aviation No. 2512 (Центральной авиационно-технической базы морской авиации ВМФ No.2512 (Military Unit 55443-MK, Kolomna). Formed c1948, 70th anniversary 2018. Major fire 2010.
- Military unit 55443-МЧ, Столбовая-2, Chekhov city district, formerly V/Ch 13818
- Military Unit 55443-NL - arsenal of the GRAU at Okulovka, Novgorod Oblast. Commanded by Colonel Arkady Plyushch in November 2017.
- military unit 55443-NP
- military unit 55443-NH
- military unit 55443-RD (formerly Military Unit 41442) Oryol region, Mtsensk, Dumchino. Previously the 1962nd Central Base for Engineering Equipment.
- military unit 55443-RK (formerly Military Unit 86741) Shelemyshevo, Skopinsky District, Ryazan Oblast. On 7 October 2020, a grass fire reached ammunition in open storage at the site, igniting munitions. The unit was once seemingly the 97th Arsenal of the Main Missile and Artillery Directorate, near Zheltukhino (ru:Желтухино (деревня, Рязанская область)). Interfaks-AVN wrote that there were 113 warehouses and bunkers with 75,000 tons of missiles, rockets, and artillery shells (including 152-mm) at the site. A women died from injuries and there were at least another 15 victims in stable condition; the fire and explosions "damaged 430 structures, public facilities, apartment buildings, and private homes." The 97th Arsenal had been active since the 1980s at least.
- Military Unit 55443-TA, Novaya Lyada, Tambov region. Seemingly a Complex or Comprehensive Storage Base for fuels and lubricants. By order of the Ministry of Defence of September 24, 2018, a 3-kilometer “restricted zone” was established, in which significant restrictions apply. Reportedly former Military Unit 42765.

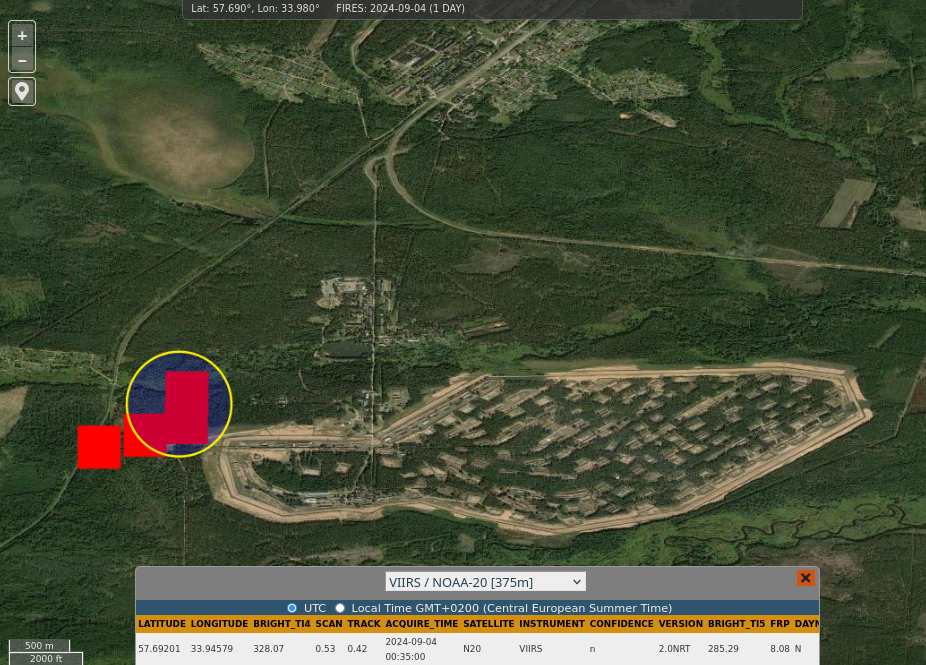
Satellite imagery of the military unit 55443-TD arsenal with NASA's FIRMS showing a fire at the entrance's railroad tracks on 4 September 2024 at 00:35:00 (UTC)

- warehouse (storage of missile and artillery weapons), military unit 55443-TD, Kuzhenkino-2 village, Bologovsky District, 171057 Tver Oblast; Alternate listed V/Ch 55443-43 as listed in a partial building collapse in March 2020 when three conscripts and an officer were reportedly injured. Seemingly former 93rd Arsenal GRAU of the Order of the Red Banner of Labour.
- Base (material and technical support, aviation, Air Force unit, 1st category), military unit 55443-TL (-16) (formerly military unit 21317), p. Khomyakovo, town of Tula. "On the basis of the order of the NPO of the USSR dated August 19, 1944, number 0036, the 2846th long-range aviation ammunition depot - military unit 55088 was formed at Khomyakovo station of the Moscow-Kursk railway in Tula Oblast. In October 1957, the depot was reorganized into the 2846th central aviation ammunition depot of the Air Force, later transformed into the 2846th regional aviation and technical depot of the Air Forces of the Moscow Military District. In 1998, the warehouse was transferred to the Air Force and Air Defense of the Moscow Military District, and in 2002 - to the troops of the Special Purpose Command. In 2003, the aviation and technical warehouse was transferred to the 16th Air Army, and from December 1, 2005, it was reorganized into the 2846th Aviation Logistics Base (Air Force formations of the first category). In accordance with the directive of the General Staff of the RF Armed Forces dated January 24, 2009 No. 314/4/076, military unit 21317 (Air Force formations of the 1st category), the 16th Air Army was transferred to the 1st Air and Air Defence Forces Command. On the basis of MOD RF directive No. D-037 dated May 26, 2012 and the headquarters of the USC Western Military District No. 5/1/0264 dated July 13, 2012, the 2846th Aviation Base MTO was renamed the air logistics base of the military unit 55443. During the existence of the military unit, 312 people were awarded various orders, and 1653 people were awarded medals. At present, the base is maintained according to state 33/023, approved on July 17, 2012." There was an attempted weapons theft in 2002.
- military unit 55443-SAT (55443-СБ)
- military unit 55443-SG, Rybinsk. The 8th Order of the Red Star Arsenal (V/Ch 41686) was located in Rybinsk, which may have been the 34th Central Artillery Base until 1958 and then the 8th Artillery Arsenal. Hero of the Soviet Union Pavel Meshcheryakov (ru:Мещеряков, Павел Матвеевич) worked at the establishment until 1967.
- work unit 55443-SP

Also reported was the 67th Arsenal of the Main Missile and Artillery Directorate (Military Unit 55443–41), located at 242500, Bryansk Oblast, Karachev, and Military Unit (в/ч) 55443–90, formerly Military Unit 96131-2 (86765) 2-й Branch (филиал) 3783-й КБМТО СГ (3783rd complex base of material-technical support, Moscow region, Schelkovsky district, town of Monino.).

After the beginning of the full-scale Russian invasion of Ukraine in early 2022, on April 25, 2022, a fire engulfed the 2nd Branch of Military Unit 55443–90, which was concerned with fuel service. The unit, which was located in Bryansk, was holding 5,000 tonnes of fuel. It may have been struck by a Ukrainian Tochka-U missile.

On 28 June 2022 the cell "BOAK-Vladimir" published a press release claiming sabotage action on railway of Military Unit Number 55443 VD Barsovo (51st Arsenal of the GRAU) near Kirzhach in Vladimir Oblast. The rails were damaged. BOAK's press release stated, "Every stopped train helps to get rid of missiles and rockets, which could hit peaceful Ukrainian cities!"
