= Main Missile and Artillery Directorate =

Department of the Russian Ministry of Defence

Main Missile and Artillery Directorate of the Ministry of Defence of the Russian Federation
- Гла́вное раке́тно-артиллери́йское управле́ние Министе́рства оборо́ны Росси́йской Федера́ции
- GRAU emblem
- Active: 1862–present Current title from 1960
- Country: Russia
- Type: Central Military Authority
- Part of: Ministry of Defence

Commanders
- Current commander: Major General Aleksey Volkov

The Main Missile and Artillery Directorate, (Note: Russian: Гла́вное раке́тно-артиллери́йское управле́ние Министе́рства оборо́ны Росси́йской Федера́ции, abbr. ГРАУ Миноборо́ны Росси́и, romanized: Glavnoye raketno-artilleriyskoye upravleniye Ministerstva oborony Rossiyskoy Federatsii, abbr. GRAU Minoborony Rossii, lit. 'Main Missile and Artillery Directorate of the Ministry of Defense of the Russian Federation') commonly referred to by its transliterated acronym GRAU (ГРАУ), is a department of the Ministry of Defence of Russia responsible for the military acquisition and equipment of the Russian Armed Forces. It is subordinate to the Chief of Armament and Munition of the Russian Armed Forces, a vice-minister of the Ministry of Defence.

The GRAU was established in 1862 to provide equipment and training for the Imperial Russian Army. It was reorganised several times under the Soviet Union before reaching its current form on 19 November 1960. The GRAU is responsible for assigning GRAU Indices – the official designations for all equipment and ammunition used by the Russian military – and currently operates most of the arsenals of the Russian Armed Forces.

As of April 2025, the Chief of the GRAU was Major-general Aleksey Volkov, who was appointed in May 2024 and succeeded Lieutenant-general Nikolai Parshin (ru:Паршин, Николай Михайлович) who took office in mid-2012.

== History ==
The Main Artillery Directorate (GAU) was established on 28 December 1862 by Order No. 375 issued by Count Dmitry Milyutin, the Minister of War of the Russian Empire. The GAU supervised the supply of the Imperial Russian Army, not only with artillery guns and ammunition, but also with small arms, and also supervised the combat training and staffing of artillery units. State-owned military factories were subordinate to it. The GAU was headed by a General–Feldtseykhmeyster (the chief of the artillery) and in 1908 the specific position of Chief of the GAU was introduced .

During the First World War, the GAU played a key role in supplying the Russian army with weapons and ammunition. During this period it was headed by General of Artillery Dmitry Kuzmin-Karavaev (ru:Kuzmin-Karavaev, Dmitry Dmitrievich) until May 1915, when he was replaced by General of Artillery Alexey Manikovsky.

In December 1917, in connection with the October Revolution and the final collapse of the Russian military, the GAU was reorganized by the Bolsheviks into the Artillery Directorate. It continued its work uninterrupted and no fundamental changes were made to it. On 15 October 1918, the position of Inspector of Artillery was established for the leadership and management of artillery at the headquarters of the Revolutionary Military Council of the Republic. From August 1921, the position was renamed Chief of Artillery of the Red Army. The same year, the Artillery Directorate became the Main Artillery Directorate. In accordance with his duties, the Inspector of Artillery supervised the combat activity of the Red Army's artillery, the creation of new artillery formations, the recruitment of personnel, and the preparation of key documents concerning the development of artillery. The total number of employees was 734.

From June 1922 to 1924, the former General-Lieutenant, Red Commander (Kraskom) Georgi Sheideman (ru:Шейдеман, Георгий Михайлович) led the artillery efforts. The number of guns and mortars available to the troops rose from 10,700 in 1932, to 34,000 by the beginning of the Second World War, in 1939.

"The central warehouses of the GAU, as a rule, were of the 1st category. In the military districts there were warehouses of all categories, but warehouses of the 3rd and 4th categories prevailed. In 1940, all warehouses that had equipment and assembly shops and turned into large military production enterprises were renamed bases."

"The most intensive construction of central ammunition depots was noted in the third five-year plan (1938-1940), when 13 warehouses with a design storage capacity of 3,000 wagons of ammunition each were built and continued. Under favourable conditions, the construction of such a warehouse was completed within four years."

"Depending on the storage capacity and the availability of production workshops, all artillery depots were divided into 4 categories, as a rule, according to operational capacity: a) warehouses of the 1st category, which included production workshops and storage capacities of up to 5000 wagons of cargo; b) warehouses of the 2nd category had storage capacities of 700 and more wagons; c) warehouses of the 3rd category - up to 500 wagons of cargo, respectively; d) warehouses of the 4th category - up to 200 wagons of cargo, respectively."

"The average capacity of the central warehouse (base) for the specified period increased from 1800 to 2100 wagons, and the average capacity of the warehouse of district subordination decreased from 610 to 415 wagons. The construction of low-power district depots was due to the need to disperse mobilization stocks of ammunition, which, as a result of their advancement to the state border, became more vulnerable to air strikes."

There were at least 33 central weapons/ammunition bases in five districts (Moscow, OrVO, KhaVO, Volga Military District, and the Ural Military District of the European part of the USSR at the beginning of the German Operation Barbarossa, the German invasion. The 357th Central base of depots and Ammunition was located in Yuski (now in Udmurtia).

Marshal of Artillery Nikolai Yakovlev became head of the GAU at the beginning of the invasion, and held the post throughout the war.

Materiel shortages during the Battle of Moscow in 1941 forced the introduction of strict rationing of ammunition supply at the Front level, and the centralization of munitions storage and distribution in the Central Bases of the People's Commissariat for Defence (NKO).

Larger storage and manufacturing sites, arsenals began to appear after the end of the Second World War. The 47th Arsenal at Tsvetokha in the Slavuta Raion of the Khmelnytsky Oblast was established in 1945. Military Depot No. 61 of the NKO was formed on May 13, 1938, at Lozovaya in Kharkiv Oblast, and on August 1, 1960 it was transformed into the 61st Arsenal of the Ministry of Defence. It was part of GRAU during the 1980s.

Ammunition depots were established for the Limited Contingent of Soviet Forces in Afghanistan during the Soviet–Afghan War. From August 8-10, 1988, there were fires and explosions in the 3704th Ammunition Depot (в/ч 77824 - 3704 артиллерийский склад вооружения и боеприпасов) of the 40th Army (Soviet Union), located in the Kelgai Valley near Puli Khumri. The detonation of the explosives storage facility, according to eyewitnesses, resembled a nuclear one with the appearance of a characteristic "mushroom cloud". Eight soldiers and one civilian cook may have been killed, with others wounded. Western sources reported that the Soviet Ministry of Foreign Affairs (Soviet Union) denied there had been any casualties.

After the declaration of independence of Ukraine, the 61st Arsenal at Lozovaya with a technical area of 247 hectares and a total area of 488.4 hectares was transferred to the Ministry of Defence of Ukraine. On August 27, 2008, a fire broke out at the arsenal, which led to the explosions of shells.

There has been large-scale use of ammunition since the 2022 Russian invasion of Ukraine, which has led to much of the Soviet-era ammunition being used up.

== Arsenals ==
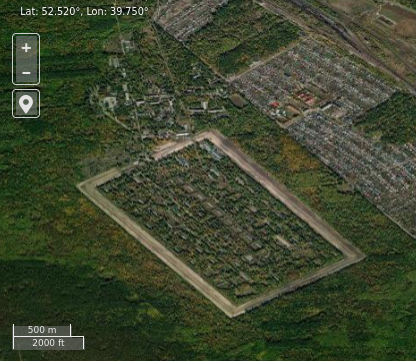
Satellite imagery of the 63rd Arsenal of the GRAU at Lipetsk

Arsenals of the GRAU, according to Kommersant-Vlast in 2005, included the 53rd at Dzerzhinsk, Nizhniy Novogorod Oblast, the 55th in the Sklad-40 microraion at Rzhev, the 60th at Kaluga, the 63rd at Lipetsk, the 75th at Serpukhov south of Moscow, the 97th at Skolin and the 107th at Toropets, all six in the Moscow Military District. The 5th at Alatyr, Chuvash Republic, the 80th Arsenal at Gagarskiy, the 103rd Arsenal at Saransk, Mordovia, and the 116th at Krasno-Oktyabrskiy were all in the Volga–Urals Military District.

=== Fires and explosions ===
Since 2009, there have been a number of fires and explosions at GRAU ammunition storage depots.

- A major series of explosions occurred at an arms depot of the 31st Arsenal of the Caspian Flotilla near Ulyanovsk on 13 November 2009. At least two people were killed in the explosion and 43 were rescued from a bomb shelter where they had taken refuge.
- There were fires and explosions at the 102nd Arsenal GRAU at Pugachevo (Malaya Purga) in Udmurtia (Volga-Urals Military District) in 2011, 2013, 2015, 2016, and 2018, and two other incidents in 2011 at the 99th Arsenal in Bashkiria and at Ashuluk. There were three more fires in 2012.
- On December 26, 2013, an Antonov An-12B transport aircraft of the Irkut company was flying along the route Novosibirsk–Irkutsk, but when landing, it crashed onto a warehouse of the 109th Arsenal GRAU located near the Irkutsk Northwest Airport (Siberian Military District). All nine people on board were killed—six crew members and three passengers.
- On 7 October 2020, a grass fire reached ammunition in open storage at Military Unit Number 55443 (once maybe the GRAU's 97th Arsenal) near Zheltukhino (ru:Желтухино (деревня, Рязанская область)) in Skopinsky District, Ryazan Oblast, igniting munitions. Whether GRAU or the Western Military District was responsible for the depot was unclear. Interfaks-AVN wrote that there were 113 warehouses and bunkers with 75,000 tons of missiles, rockets, and artillery shells (including 152-mm) at the site. A woman died from injuries and there were at least another 15 victims in stable condition; the fire and explosions "damaged 430 structures, public facilities, apartment buildings, and private homes."
- On 28 June 2022 the cell "BOAK-Vladimir" published a press release claiming sabotage action on railway of the 51st Arsenal GRAU (Military Unit Number 55443 VD), Barsovo, near Kirzhach in Vladimir Oblast. The rails were damaged. BOAK's press release stated, "Every stopped train helps to get rid of missiles and rockets, which could hit peaceful Ukrainian cities!"
- On 4 September 2024 the railroad tracks at the entrance to the 93rd GRAU arsenal of military unit 55443-TD near Kuzhenkino and 7 km West-northwest of Borisovsky Khotilovo air base saw an extensive fire detected by NASA's FIRMS.
- Toropets depot explosions – On the night of 17–18 September 2024, during the Russo-Ukrainian War, Ukraine launched a drone attack on the 107th Arsenal GRAU ammunition depot in Toropets, causing a massive series of explosions and fires while damaging much of the town. The attack resulted in an earthquake-magnitude blast, and NASA satellites detected the resulting fires over an area of approximately 13 km^{2} (5 sq mi). The blast wave spread up to 200 mi (320 km) and was estimated to be consistent with 200–240 tonnes of TNT (840–1,000 GJ) of high-explosives detonating. The Security Service of Ukraine claimed that "Iskander, Tochka and KAB missiles" were stored at the facility. Russian officials reported that 13 people had been injured and that an evacuation of the area had been ordered.
- On 21 September 2024 both the 23rd Arsenal GRAU near Oktyabrsky and the 719th Artillery Ammunition Depot near Tikhoretsk caught fire due to drone attacks. The 23rd Arsenal is located 16 km south of Toropets, where the GRAU arsenal was still on fire from the attack three days prior.
- On 9 October 2024 the ammunition storage area at the 67th Arsenal GRAU (V/Ch 55443-BK (41), former V/Ch 92919) near Karachev, located in Bryansk Oblast, approximately 114 km from the Ukrainian border, was attacked by Ukrainian drones. Fires, explosions and continuous detonations for hours resulted, but initial battle damage assessment has not yet been made by independent military analysts. Two ammunition storage warehouses were destroyed.
- On 20 November 2024 the 13th Arsenal located at Kotovo, Novgorod Oblast was attacked by Ukrainian drones and Kotovo residents were evacuated to nearby Okulovka as a precaution.
- On 22nd April 2025, the 51st arsenal located at Barsovo, Vladimir Oblast suffered an explosion followed by fires and 450 residents were evacuated from nearby towns.
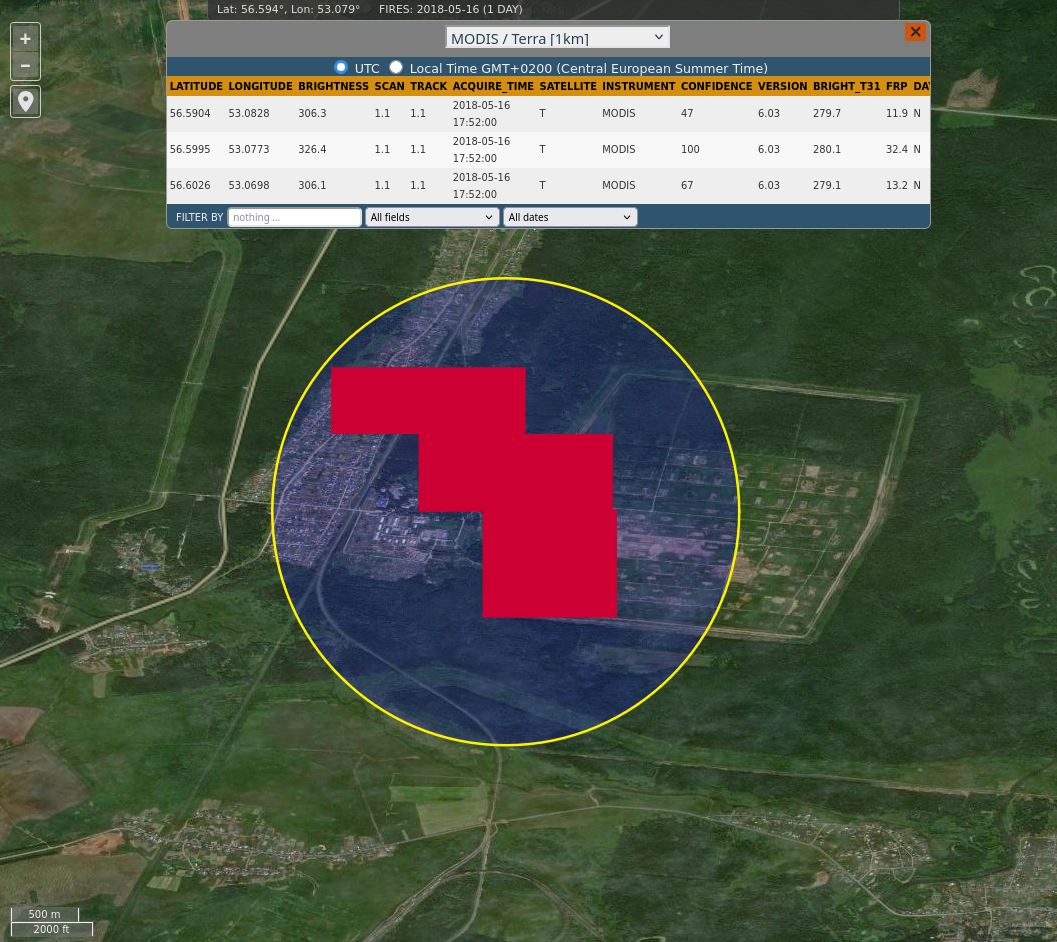
Extensive fire in and near the 102nd GRAU Arsenal at Pugachevo on 16 May 2018

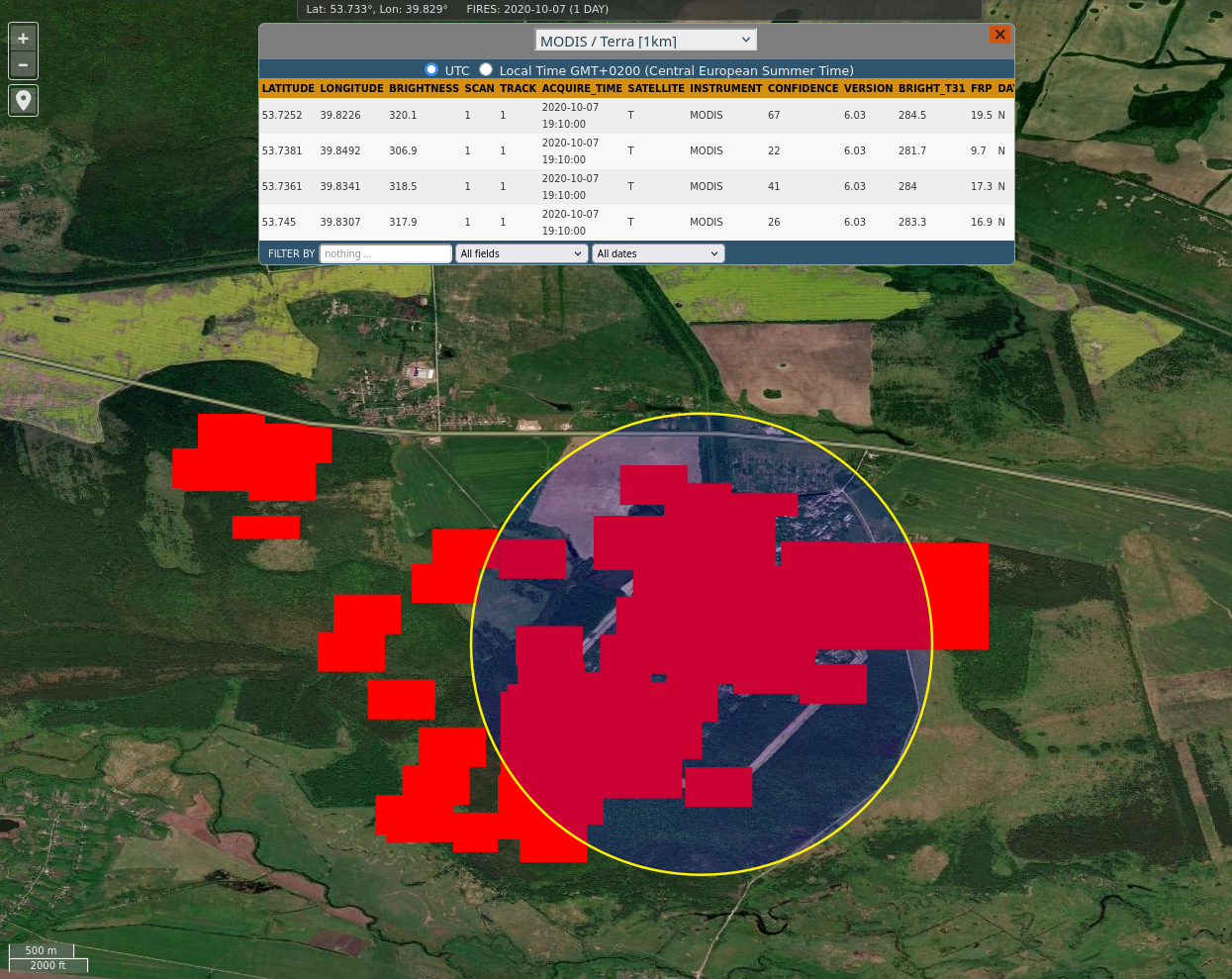
Wildfire enveloping open storage at Military Unit Number 55443 near Zheltukhino on 7 October 2020

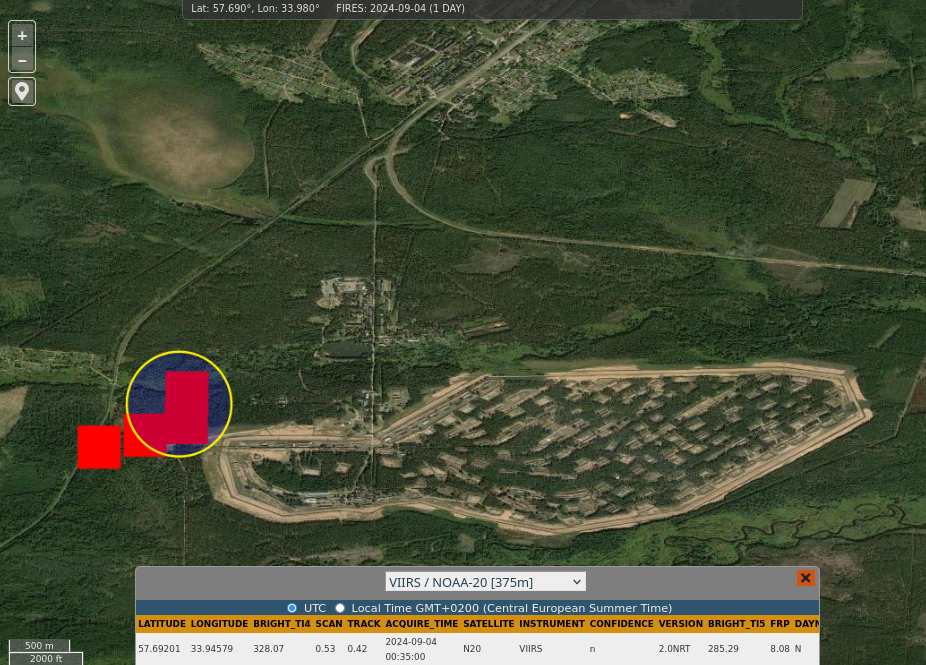
Fire around the railroad tracks at the entrance to the 93rd GRAU arsenal near Kuzhenkino on 4 September 2024

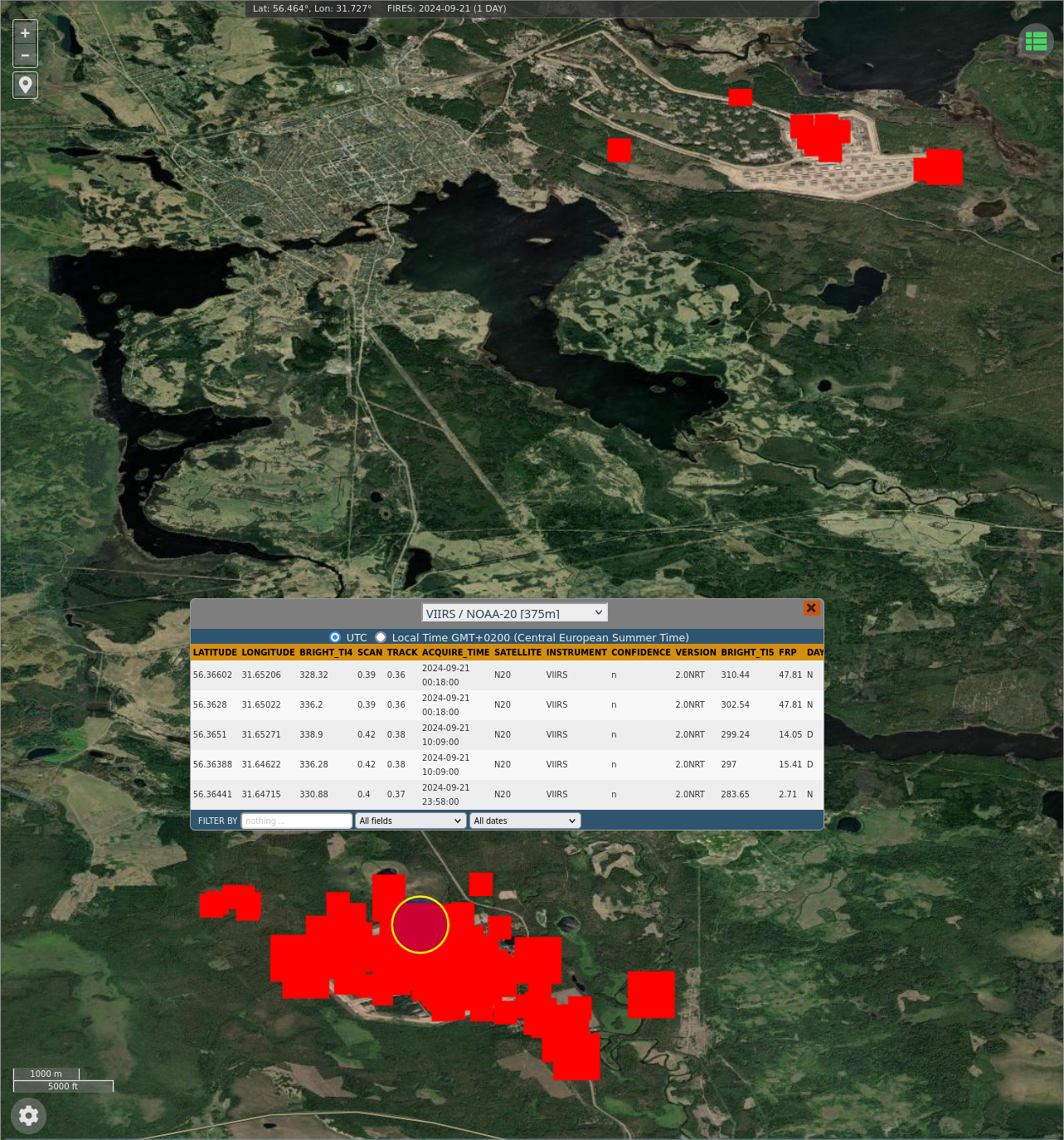
Extensive fire in 23rd arsenal south of Toropets with still ongoing fire at 107th arsenal on 21 September 2024

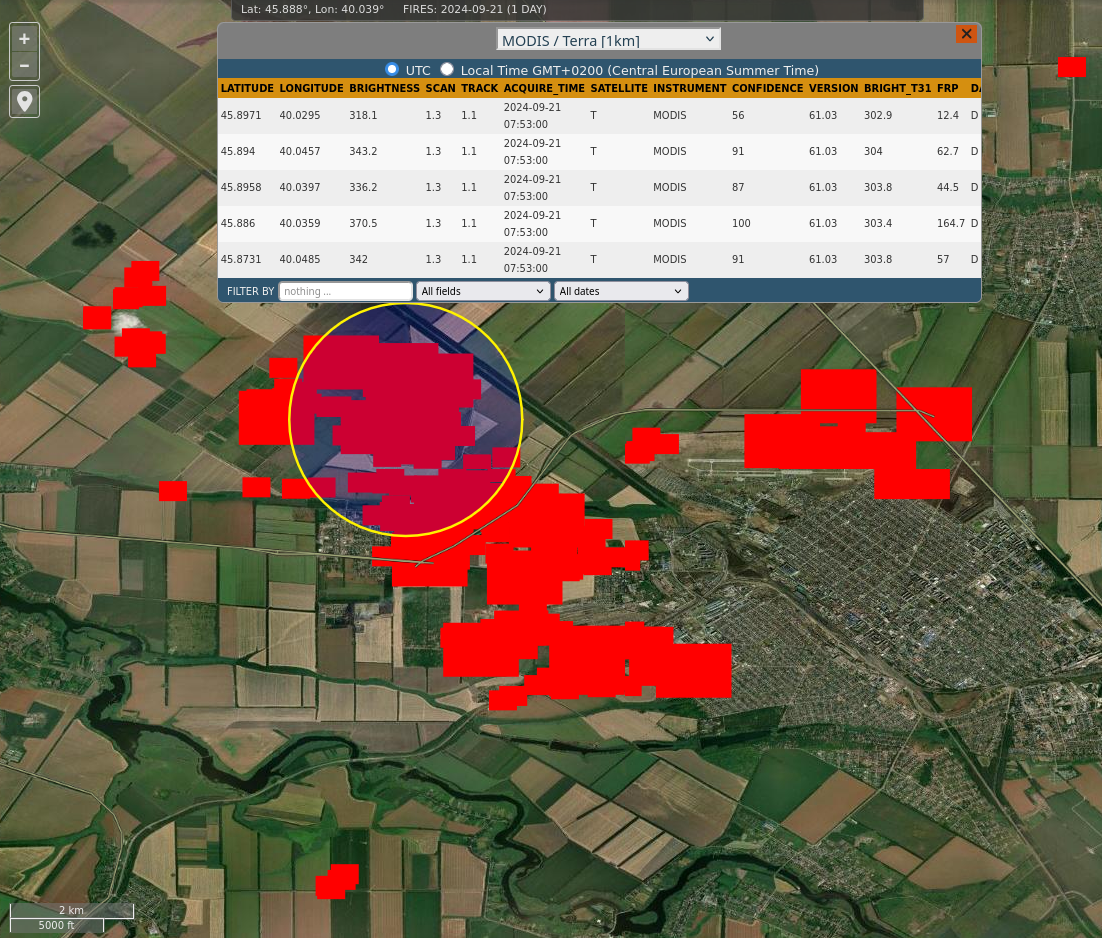
Extensive fire in 719th arsenal northwest of Tikhoretsk, along with fires at the Tikhoretsk air base and rail yard on 21 September 2024

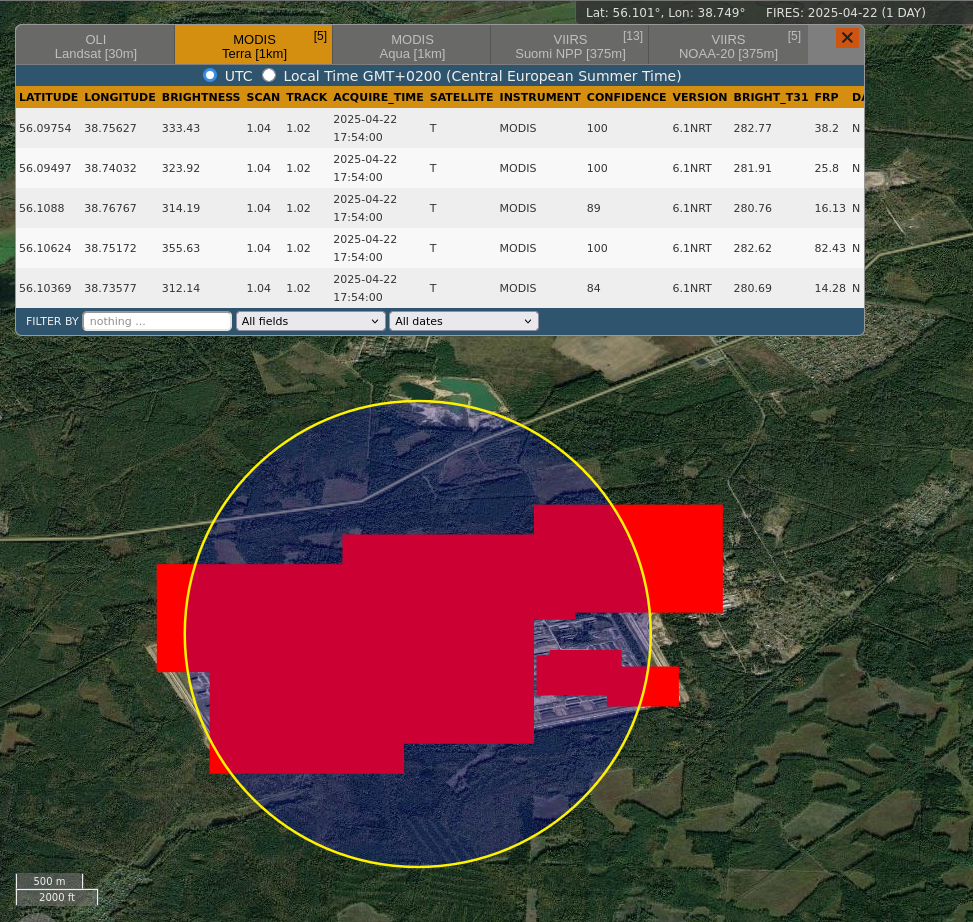
Extensive fire in the 51st arsenal near Barsovo on 22 April 2025

== Chiefs of the GRAU, 1965-present ==
- Marshal of Artillery P N Kuleshov (1965 - 1983) - a Katyusha rocket expert
- General Colonel Yu. M. Andrianov (May 1984 - September 1986)(ru:Андрианов,_Юрий_Михайлович)
- General Colonel M. E. Penkin (September 1986 - October 1991)
- General Colonel A. P. Sitnov (October 1991 - March 1994)
- General Colonel N. I. Karaulov (April 1994 - August 2000)
- General Colonel N. I. Svertilov (October 2000 - 2007)
- General Major O. S. Chikirev (2007 — 2009) (dismissed in 2009 in connection with explosions at ammunition depots in Ulyanovsk)
- General Major A. L. Romanovsky (2009 — 2012)
- General Lieutenant Nikolai Parshin (July 2012 — May 2024)
- General-mayor Aleksey Volkov (May 2024 - present)

== Current GRAU indices ==
GRAU indices are of the form ⟨number⟩ ⟨letter⟩ ⟨number⟩, sometimes with a further suffix ⟨letter⟩ ⟨number⟩. They may be followed by a specially assigned codename. For example "2 S 19 Msta-S", the 2S19 Msta self-propelled howitzer, has the index 2S19, without suffix; Msta-S is the codename.

=== Misconceptions ===
Several common misconceptions surround the scope and originating body of these indices. The GRAU designation is not an industrial designation, nor is it assigned by the design bureau. In addition to its GRAU designation, a given piece of equipment could have a design name, an industrial name and a service designation.

For example, one of the surface-to-air missiles in the S-25 Berkut air defense system had at least four domestic designations:

- design name: La-205
- GRAU index: 5V7
- industry name: Product 205 (Izdeliye 205)
- Soviet military designation: V-300

Some Soviet general-purpose bombs bore a designation that looked confusingly similar to GRAU. (Note: For example, the FAB-250sch entered service in 1944 with the designation 7-F-334, which was not assigned by GRAU.)

=== Designation scheme ===
The first part of a GRAU index is a number indicating which of the several main categories of equipment a given item belongs to. The second part, a Cyrillic character, indicates the subcategory. The third part, a number, indicates the specific model. The optional suffix can be used to differentiate variants of the same model.

==== 1 (Radio and electronics equipment) ====
- 1K: Buran (the first Buran-class orbiter; see also "#11 (Rocketry and associated equipment)")
- 1L: 1L14, the IFF detector for the 9K310 (Igla) air defense system
- 1S: Radar (1S11, target detecting radar of 1S91 command and control vehicle of 2K12 Kub air defense system)
- 1V: Artillery command vehicles (1V18/19 on BTR-60 chassis, 1V13/16 on MT-LBu chassis)
- 1P: Firearms optic (1P87 optic on AK-12, 1P70 optic on SVDK). 1PN designates the firearms optic as a night vision device, e.g. 1PN51.

==== 2 (Artillery systems and anti bunker rounds) ====
- 2A: Towed artillery systems (2A65 Msta-B) or Tank Cannons (2A18, 2A46M-5)
- 2B: Mortar Systems (2B9 Vasilek, 2B14 Podnos)
- 2K: Air Defence Systems (2K11, Krug surface-to-air missile system; 2К12, Kub surface-to-air missile system, 2K22, Tunguska surface-to-air gun-missile system)
- 2S: Self-propelled artillery systems (2S1 Gvozdika, 2S19 Msta-S)
- 2VG: Anti structure rounds (2VG11)
- 2U: Training equipment

==== 3 (Army and naval missiles or Anti Tank Shells) ====
- 3M: Various missiles (3M80 Moskit, 3M45 Granit)
- 3BK: Heat shells (3BK18M, 3BK13)
- 3BM: APFSDS Rounds (3BM42 "Mango", 3BM60 "Svinets 2")
- 3BR: Armour Piercing rounds that are not APDS or APFSDS
- 3O: Cluster shells (3O28, 3O15)
- 3OF: High Explosive Shells (3OF25, 3OF26)
- 3VBK: Index for the whole HEAT shell
- 3VBM Index for whole APFSDS shell
- 3VBR: Index for whole AP/ APHE round
- 3VO: Index for whole cluster shell
- 3VOF: Index for whole HE shell

==== 4 (Naval missiles and army equipment (munitions, reactive armour, etc.)) ====
- 4G: Warheads (4G15, the high explosive/HEAT warhead for the P-15 Termit anti-ship missile)
- 4K: Naval missiles (4K10, the submarine-launched ballistic missile R-27 (RSM-25) for D-5 "Zyb" system; 4K40, P-15 Termit missile)
- 4P: Launchers
- 4S: Launchers (4S95, the launcher of "Kinzhal/Klinok" (SA-15 Gauntlet) air defense complex)

==== 5 (Air defense equipment) ====
- 5Ae: Computers (5Ae26, a specialized multi-CPU computer with a performance of 1.5 MIPS)
- 5B: Surface-to-air missile warheads (5B18, the warhead for the S-125's V-601 missile)
- 5P: Surface-to-air missile launchers (5P75, the four-missile launcher for the S-125 air defense system)
- 5V: Surface-to-air missiles (5V55, SAM for S-300 air defense system)
- 5Ya: Surface-to-air missiles (5Ya23, a SAM for the S-75 air defense system)
- 5#

* 51T6 (SH-11/ABM-4 Gorgone), an exoatmospheric anti-ballistic missile interceptor for the A-135 air defense system
* 53T6 (SH-08/ABM-3 Gazelle), an endoatmospheric interceptor for A-135 air defense system

==== 6 (Firearms, air defense equipment) ====
- 6B: Body armor (6B1; 6B13, for mountain troops; 6B23, MOLLE; 6B43, MOLLE for airborne, naval and special troops), helmets (6B6)
- 6Ch: Firearm equipment (6Ch12, the PBS-1 flash suppressor and silencer; 6Ch63, AK modernize kit; 6Ch64, front grip)
- 6E: Firearm equipment (6E7, flashlight)
- 6G: Grenade or rocket launchers (6G3, the RPG-7 man-portable, rocket-propelled grenade launcher; 6G17, the VOG-25 40 mm grenade cartridge)
- 6Kh: Knives and bayonets (6Kh3, a sword-bayonet for the AKM)
- 6P: Firearms (6P1, the 7.62 mm AKM, and 6P41/6P41M, PKP)
- 6Sh: Firearm equipment (6Sh5, a rifle sling; 6Sh92, tactical vest; 6Sh104, SVD/VSS vest for sniper and backpack with rain cover and 2 side MOLLE pouches; 6Sh105, normal or digital tactical vest; 6Sh112, MOLLE tactical vest for PKM/PKP machine-gunner)
- 6T: Firearm equipment (6T2, Samozhenkov's carriage for PKS machine gun)
- 6Ts: Sights (6Ts1, the PSO-1 sight for the Dragunov sniper rifle)
- 6U: Firearm equipment (6U1, personnel carrier vehicle carriage for PKB/PKBM machine gun)
- 6V: Firearms (6V1, the Dragunov sniper rifle)
- 6Yu: Firearm accessories kit (6Yu4, accessories kit for the AKM)
- 6Zh: Firearm equipment (6Zh1M, a 100-round belt-box for the PKM machine gun)
- 6L: Magazine (6L20, bakelite plastic 5.45×39mm magazine for the AK-74)

==== 7 (Firearm munitions) ====
- 7B: Ammunition (7B33, the 7.62×54mmR armour-piercing/incendiary round)
- 7G: Grenades (7G1, the RKG-3 handheld HEAT grenade)
- 7Kh: Training ammunition (7Kh1, the 12.7×108mm blank cartridge)
- 7N: Ammunition (7N1, the 7.62×54mmR round for sniper rifles)
- 7P: Rocket-propelled grenades (7P1, a 40 mm RPG-7 round)
- 7S: Misc. ammunition (7S1, a signal false-fire of orange smoke)
- 7T: Ammunition (7T2, the 7.62×54mmR tracer round)
- 7U: Ammunition (7U1, the 5.45×39mm low speed (subsonic) US (Umenshennoy Skorosti; "Reduced Speed") cartridge)
- 7Z: Ammunition (7Z1, the 14.5×115mm incendiary round)

===== Exceptions =====
- 71Kh6: the US-KMO Prognoz-2 early warning system satellite
- 73N6 Baikal-1: an automated air defense command and control system
- 75E6 Parol-3: the IFF interrogator for the S-75M and S-125
- 76N6: a low-altitude target detector radar

==== 8 (Army missiles and rocketry) ====
- 8A: Ballistic missiles
- 8D: Rocket engines (mostly)
- 8F: Warheads
- 8K: Missiles (8K51, 8K63 Dvina, 8K64, 8K67, 8K71, 8K81, 8K84)
- 8P: Expendable launch systems
- 8S: Missile propulsion stages

==== 9 (Army missiles, UAVs) ====
- 9A: Launchers (9A52, the chassis of the BM-30 Smerch MLRS)
- 9F: Training and equipment systems (9F827 of the BM-30 Smerch system)
- 9K: Systems (9К33 Osa surface-to-air missile system; 9K115-2 Metis-M anti-tank missile system; 9K310 Igla air defense system 9K111 Fagot anti-tank weapon system)
- 9M: Missiles (9M133 Kornet, 9M123 Khrizantema, 9M120 Ataka ATGM)
- 9P: Launchers (9P140, the chassis of the BM-27 Uragan MLRS)
- 9S: 9S737, Ranzhir mobile command center
- 9T: Transporter-loaders and re-supply vehicles (9T234 of the BM-30 Smerch system, 9T244 of the 9K331 Tor system)

==== 10 (Equipment) ====
- 10P: Sights (10P19, the PGO-7V sight for RPG-7V grenade launcher)
- 10R: Radios (10R30 Karat-2, a radio transmitter)

==== 11 (Rocketry and associated equipment) ====
- 11A: Rocketry (11A51, the Korolev N1 heavy-lift launcher, 11A511, the Soyuz launcher)
- 11B: Nuclear thermal rocket engines (11B91 (RD0410); 11B97)
- 11D: Rocket engines (11D43, the RD-253 liquid fuel rocket engine (First stage of Proton space launcher))
- 11F: Satellites (11F67 Molniya-1, a telecom satellite; 11F35 K1 Buran (the first Buran-class shuttle; see also "#1 (Radio and electronics equipment)"); 11F654 GLONASS satellites; 11F94 LK, a lunar lander; 11F732 Soyuz spacecraft )
- 11G: Equipment (11G12, a refuelling station)
- 11K: Rocketry (11K25 Energia, a heavy-lift rocket for the Buran–class shuttle)
- 11M: Onboard equipment (11M243, solar array actuators for the 11F624 Yantar-2K satellite)
- 11P: Ground equipment (11P825, the launch complex for the 11K25)
- 11S: Rocket stages (11S59, the 1st and 2nd stages ("unit A") of the Soyuz rocket)

==== 14 (Rocketry and associated equipment) ====
- 14A: Rockets (14A15, is the "Soyuz-2-1v")
- 14D: Rocket engines (14D30, the "Briz" booster's S5.98M liquid fuel engine)
- 14F: Satellites (14F10, the IS-MU Naryad anti-satellite weapon)
- 14I: Ground equipment (14I02, the ground equipment for the "Briz" booster's 8P882 system)
- 14P: Ground equipment (14P72, the service system for the "Briz" booster)
- 14S: Boosters (14S12, the "Briz" booster)
- 14T: Ground equipment (14T81, the storage equipment for the "Briz" booster)

==== 15 (Strategic Missile Forces equipment) ====
- 15A: Intercontinental ballistic missiles (15A14 and 15A18, the R-36M (SS-18 Satan) ICBM; 15A15, the UR-100MR (SS-17 Spanker) ICBM)
- 15B: Warheads
- 15D: Rocket engines (mostly)
- 15F: Warheads
- 15N: Command and control vehicles
- 15P: Silo-based launchers (mostly)
- 15U: ICBM ground equipment
- 15Zh: ICBMs and tactical ballistic missiles (15Zh45, the RT-21M Pioneer (SS-20 Saber) TBM)

==== 17 (Rocketry and associated equipment) ====
- 17D: Misc. rocket engines (17D58Ae, the stabilization and orientation engine of the "Briz-M" booster)
- 17F: Satellites (17F15 Raduga-1, a telecommunications satellite)
- 17K: Space-based systems (17K114, a space-based reconnaissance and targeting system)
- 17P: Ground equipment (17P31, the start system for 11K25)
- 17S: Rocket stages (17S40, Unit D of the Proton launcher)
- 17U: Ground equipment (17U551, the "Briz-M" booster testing system)

== See also ==
- Arsenals of the Russian Armed Forces
- Designations of Russian towed artillery
- NATO reporting name
