= Sklad-40 =

Military camp in Rzhev, Russia

- Склад-40
- Советская сторона, Western Rzhev, Rzhev in Russia
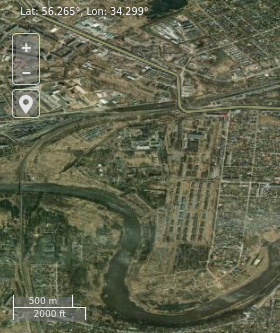
- Satellite imagery of Sklad-40 army base

Site information
- Type: Weapons storage and repair depot
- Owner: Russian Ministry of Defence
- Operator: 55th Arsenal

Location
- Shown within Tver Oblast Sklad-40 (Russia)
- Coordinates: 56°15′55″N 34°17′58″E

Site history
- In use: 1918-

Garrison information
- Garrison: 86286

Sklad-40 (Склад-40) (also Arsenal) - a closed military camp in the western part of the city of Rzhev in the Tver Oblast, on the ru:Советская сторона (Soviet side).

It is a microdistrict of the city of Rzhev. All the houses of the microdistrict are assigned to Karl Marx Street.

Military Unit Number 86286, the 55th Arsenal Main Missile and Artillery Directorate of the Ministry of Defence, is garrisoned in the town.

A civilian enterprise operates on the basis of the military unit - OAO 55 Arsenal, which specializes in the repair of military and special equipment, as well as the production of trailers and other consumer goods.

== History ==
The history of the arsenal begins in 1918, when a warehouse redeployed from Dvinsk and artillery was placed in Rzhev.

On September 16, 1919, by order of the commander of the Armies of the Western Front No. 683, the warehouse was given the name Rzhevskaya Artillery Base Western Front.

During the years of the Russian Civil War, the workers and employees of the base worked selflessly to provide the front with the necessary weapons and equipment.

In 1922 the Rzhevskaya artillery base receives the name of the Rzhevskaya artillery warehouse of the first category and becomes subordinate to the Artillery Directorate of the Workers' and Peasants' Red Army.

In 1923 the warehouse is inspected by the inspectorate of the Main Artillery Directorate, which marks the work of the personnel as one of the best in the young Soviet Republic.

In 1928 the Rzhevsky Artillery Depot was renamed into Military Depot No. 40, from which the name of the residential town came.

In the same years, barracks and the first barrack houses for fighters and commanders of the Red Army appeared in the town.

In 1938, Military Depot No. 40 was renamed Military Base No. 40.

In July 1941, with the beginning of the Great Patriotic War, military base No. 40, in accordance with the order of the People's Commissar of Defense, was relocated to the city of Alatyr, Chuvash ASSR, where it is currently located under the name of the 5th arsenal of the GRAU. Immediately after the war, a new military formation was formed on the site of the Rzhev base - the 55th arsenal of the GRAU.

== Transport ==
Communication with the center of Rzhev is carried out by bus route No. 3.

== Notes ==
- Feskov, V.I.; Kalashnikov, K.A.; Golikov, V.I.; Slugin, S.A. (2013). Вооруженные силы СССР после Второй Мировой войны: от Красной Армии к Советской (часть 1: Сухопутные войска) [The Armed Forces of the USSR after World War II, from the Red Army to the Soviet (Part 1: Land Forces).]. Tomsk. Improved version of 2004 work with many inaccuracies corrected.
