= Kedrovka =

Kedrovka may refer to:

- Kedrovka, a former urban-type settlement in Kemerovo Oblast; since 2004—a part of the city of Kemerovo
- Kedrovka, Sverdlovsk Oblast, a former urban-type settlement in Sverdlovsk Oblast; since 2004—a settlement
