= 6B6 helmet =

Russian titanium combat helmet

6B6
- Type: Combat helmet
- Place of origin: Soviet Union; Russian Federation

Service history
- In service: 2000-?
- Used by: Russian Armed Forces
- Wars: First Chechen War; War in South Ossetia

Production history
- Designer: NII Stali
- Manufacturer: NII Stali

Specifications
- Weight: ~ 1.5-1.6 kg

The 6B6 is a titanium ballistic helmet adopted by Russian Armed Forces. Developed as part of Borit-M program by NII Stali, it was adopted alongside the aramid 6B7. It provided better protection, but was never issued as widely as its aramid counterpart, in part due to its higher weight and cost.

== History ==
6B6 was developed as part of Borit-M program in 1990s by NII Stali. It was officially adopted in the year 2000 by the order of the Minister of Defence together with 6B7 and 6B14 helmets. It was never produced as widely as 6B7 because of its cost and weight.

The helmet was used by the 589th Separate Motorized Rifle Regiment during the War in South Ossetia.

== Design ==
The helmet consists of an outer 3 mm thick titanium layer and an aramid liner. As such, it provides better protection than Br 1 rated 6B7 helmet; It can withstand 7.62x25 Pst gzh steel core rounds from a distance of 50 meters.
