= Urman, Iglinsky District, Republic of Bashkortostan =

Urman Урман
- Selo
- Location within Bashkortostan Location within Russia
- Coordinates: 54°52′N 56°52′E
- Country: Russia
- Region: Bashkortostan
- District: Iglinsky District
- Time zone: UTC+5:00

Urman (Bashkir and Russian: Урман) is a rural locality (a selo) and the administrative centre of Urmansky Selsoviet, Iglinsky District, Bashkortostan, Russia. The population was 2,877 as of 2010. There are 26 streets.

== Geography ==
Urman is located 44 km east of Iglino (the district's administrative centre) by road. Novy is the nearest rural locality.
