= Gorodishchi, Petushinsky District, Vladimir Oblast =

Urban locality in Vladimir Oblast, Russia

Coordinates: 55°52′06″N 39°05′54″E

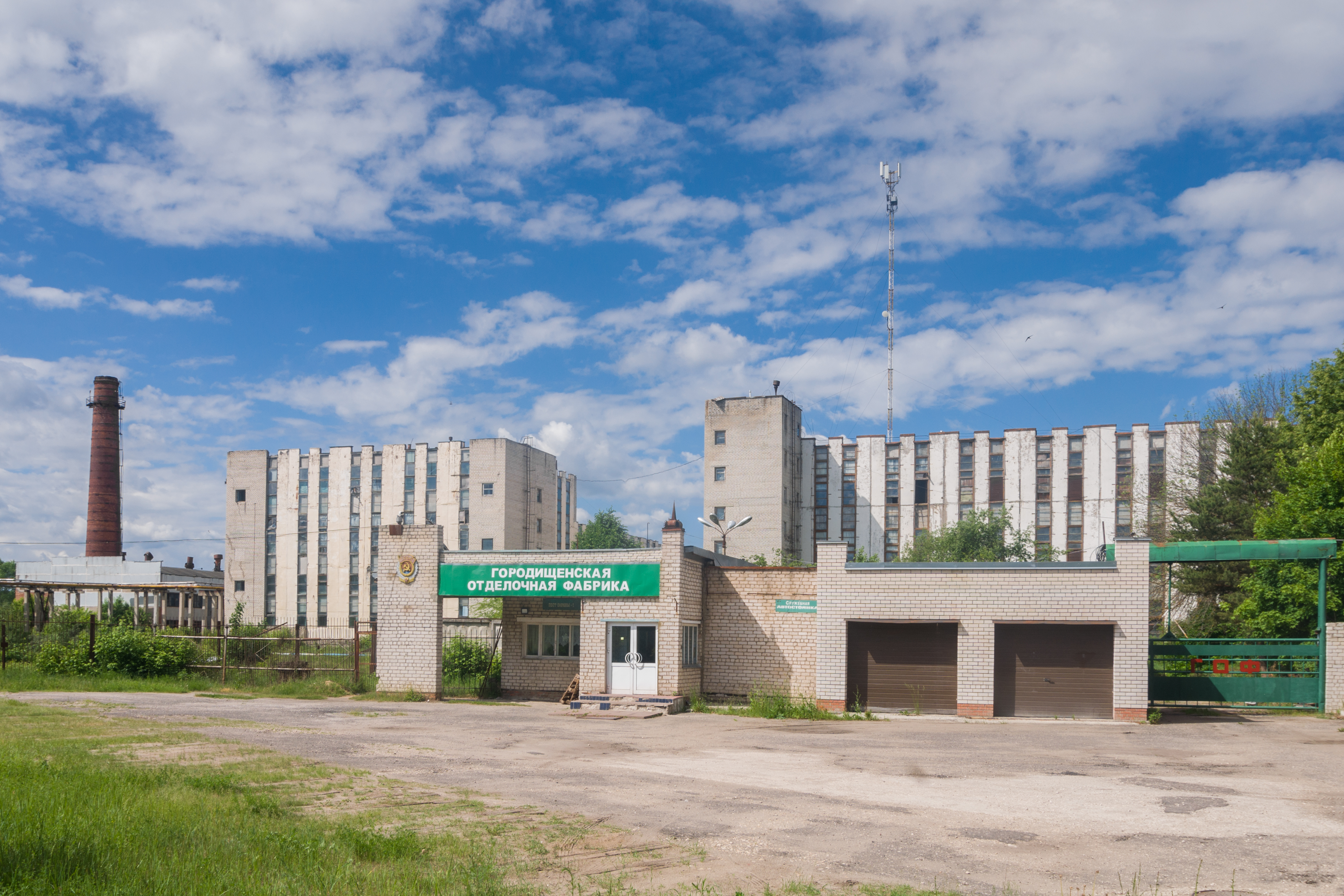
The furniture factory

Gorodishchi (Russian: Городищи) is an urban-type settlement in Petushinsky District of Vladimir Oblast, Russia. Population: 4,290 (2021 census); 5,628 (2010 census); 5,942 (2002 census); 6,149 (1989 Soviet census).
