= Toropets depot explosions =

Ukrainian attack on Russian ammunition depot

2024 Toropets depot explosions
- Part of the Ukrainian attacks in Russia during the Russian invasion of Ukraine
- NASA FIRMS imagery of the Toropets depot fires from 2024-09-17 to 2024-09-21 with first detection at 2024-09-17 23:58:00 (UTC)
- Date: September 17–18, 2024
- Time: 3:56 (UTC+03:00)
- Venue: Toropets weapon depot
- Location: Toropets, Tver Oblast, Russia; 56°30′0″N 31°43′15″E
- Type: Weapons storage explosion
- Cause: Ukrainian drone attack
- Perpetrator: Security Service of Ukraine
- Deaths: 0 (per Russia)
- Injuries: 13 (per Russia)

On the night of 17–18 September 2024, during the Russo-Ukrainian War, Ukraine launched a drone attack on the 107th Arsenal, Main Missile and Artillery Directorate (GRAU), an ammunition depot of the Russian Armed Forces in Toropets, Tver Oblast. The attack caused a massive series of explosions and fires and shattered windows across nearby towns. The primary explosion caused an 82 m wide crater and a seismic wave of magnitude 2.5~2.8 on 18 September, 3:56 am, local time.

== Context ==
Following more than two years of war, Ukraine moved the conflict into Russian territories. On 6 August 2024, Ukraine launched an incursion into Kursk Oblast. Ukraine claimed responsibility for the attack stating it was led with domestically manufactured airborne drones with a goal of normalizing such in-depth attacks in order to ease allies' stances. Ukrainian representatives stated that more attacks of this kind are expected in order to “methodically” reduce Russia’s missile potential.

== Target ==
In 2012, a program was launched to develop a comprehensive system for safeguarding ammunition in order to reduce the risk of accidental detonations. Funding for this program amounted to 90 billion rubles. The minister of defense Sergei Shoigu stated that under this program, in 2015 it was planned to produce 454 units in 13 arsenals. The 107th Arsenal was modernized within the framework of this programme. 3.5 billion rubles were allocated for the construction of shelters in this territory. A modern arsenal was to appear, in compliance with environmental requirements.

The facility was substantially expanded after 2010, reaching its current state by 2018, as seen in Google Earth history: numerous new buildings and hardened bunkers were added on the southeastern end, perhaps doubling the storage capacity.

Euronews reported that the military ammunition depot had been renovated in 2018 and that the Russian deputy defense minister claimed that the site met the "highest international standards" and could defend against weapons such as missiles and "even a small nuclear attack." Euronews also reported that approximately 30,000 tonnes of military munitions were stored at the facility, including "fuel tanks, as well as Iskander and Tochka-U missile systems, guided aerial bombs, and assorted artillery ammunition." Russia had also started to store North Korean munitions in Toropets. NBC reported that KAB missiles were also stored at the facility.

=== Depot contents ===
- Fuel tanks
- Missiles and explosive warehouses
- S300 missiles
- Iskander tactical missile systems
- Tochka-U tactical missile systems
- Guided aerial bombs / KABs
- North Korean Hwasong-11A (KN-23) missiles
- Artillery ammunition
- North Korean munitions

=== CIA involvement ===
Intelligence about the depot's munitions, its vulnerabilities, and nearby Russian defensive systems was provided to Ukraine by the Central Intelligence Agency. CIA officers were also responsible for calculating how many drones would be necessary and for planning the drones' flight paths.

== Attack ==
Ukrainska Pravda cited Ukraine's Security Service, Defence Intelligence, and Special Operations Force as the author of the nighttime attack. According to Russian Defense Ministry, all of the 54 Ukrainian drones aimed at western Russian regions were successfully intercepted. According to Igor Rudenya, governor of Tver Oblast, debris of a successfully downed Ukrainian drone caused the fire, igniting the ammunition depot and the series of explosions.

On 22 September 2024, media reported that Ukrainian drones had struck a second ammunition depot located south of Toropets, again causing a large fire.

== Explosions ==
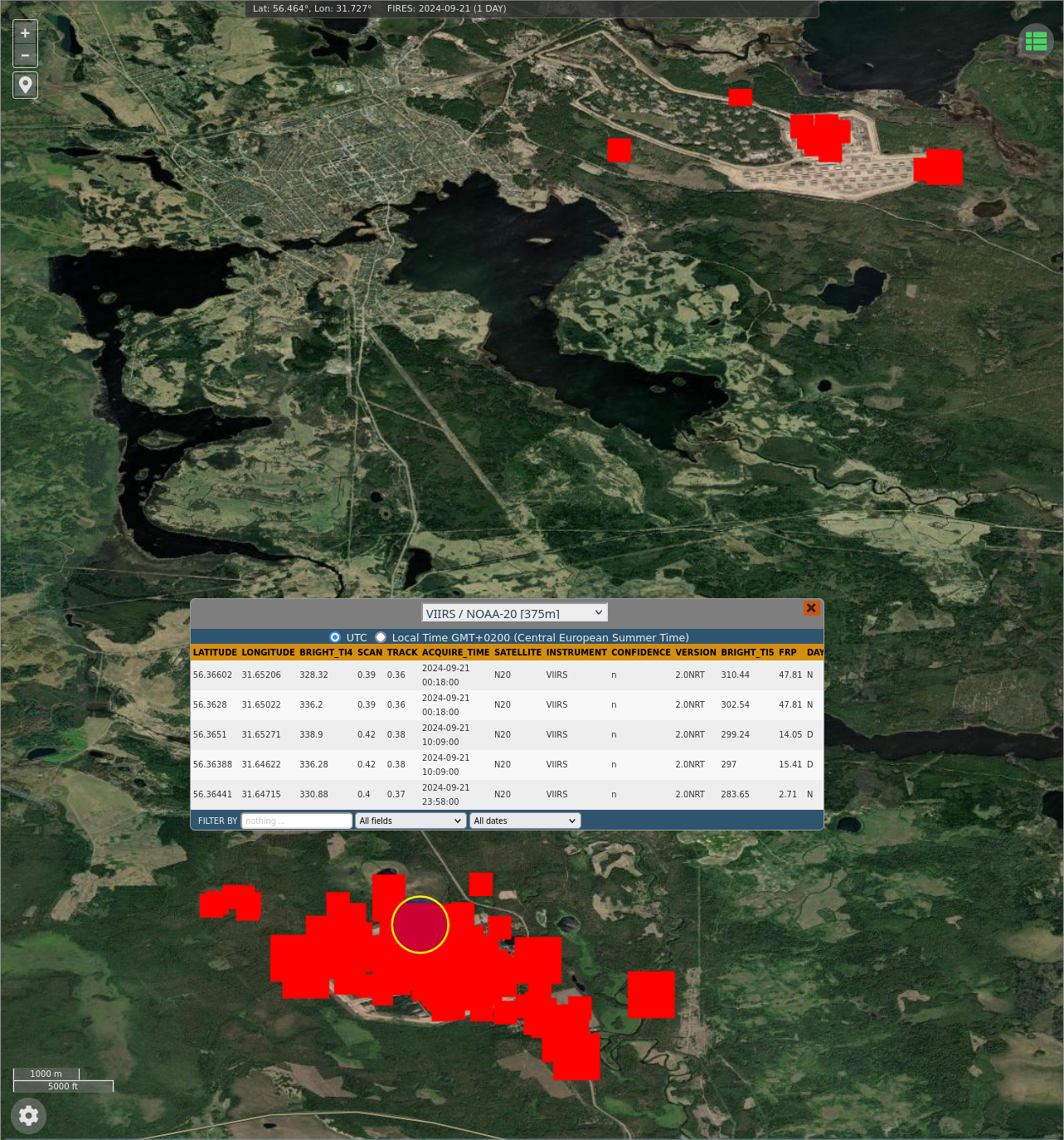
NASA FIRMS imagery from 21 September 2024 showing the newer, extensive fire south of Toropets with first detections at 00:18:00 (UTC) and the still ongoing fire from the first attack east of Toropets

The attack resulted in multiple secondary explosions, the largest being an earthquake-magnitude blast. The blast wave spread up to 300 km (200 mi) and was estimated to have a TNT equivalent of either 200 to 240 tons or 1.3 to 1.8 kilotons of high explosives. Resulting fires were detected from NASA's fire monitoring systems as covering an area of approximately 13 km^{2} (5 sq mi).

== Consequences ==
Igor Rudenya, governor of Tver Oblast, announced a partial evacuation of the town but declared that there were no serious injuries or fatalities. Russian officials later reported that 13 people had been injured.

However, according to pro–Russian milblogger Anastasia Kashevarova, hundreds of Russians may have been killed in the strike, with the facility's utility block alone accommodating 200 people.

On 20 September, Colonel Kiviselg, head of the Estonian Defense Forces Intelligence Center, estimated that the strike had caused 30,000 tonnes of munitions to explode, the size of which he equated to 750,000 shells, adding that the strike destroyed two to three months of Russia's ammunition supply. The depot reportedly stored not only artillery shells but also Iskander missiles, Tochka-U ballistic missiles, and glide bombs. It is unclear if his bomb damage assessment includes both missiles and artillery ammunition.

== See also ==
- List of arsenals of the Russian Armed Forces
- RAF Fauld explosion
- 2020 Beirut explosion
- 2022 Crimean Bridge explosion
- Raids on the Tendra Spit
- 2014 Vrbětice ammunition warehouse explosions
- Attacks in Russia during the Russian invasion of Ukraine
