= Arsenal =

Place where weaponry is made, stored, repaired etc

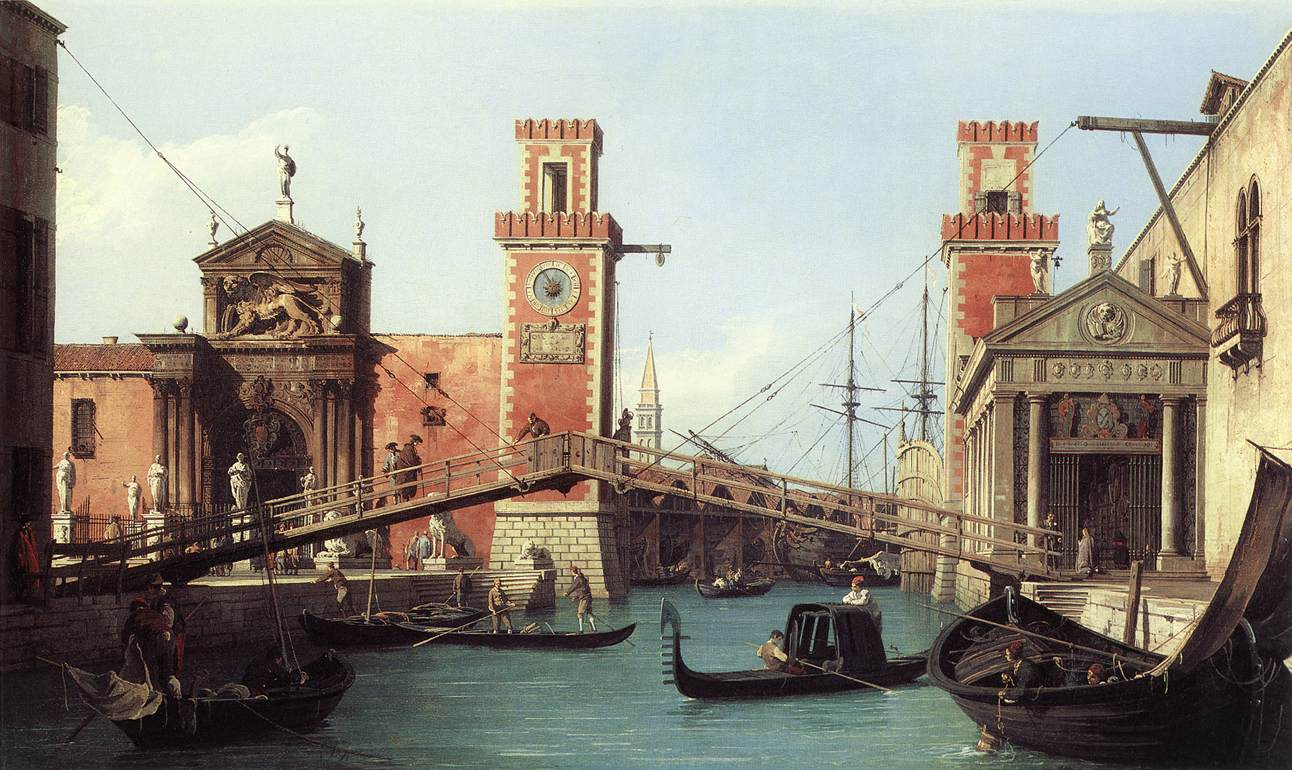
View of the Entrance to the Arsenal, by Canaletto, 1732

Armourers of the Royal Flying Corps maintaining Lewis guns

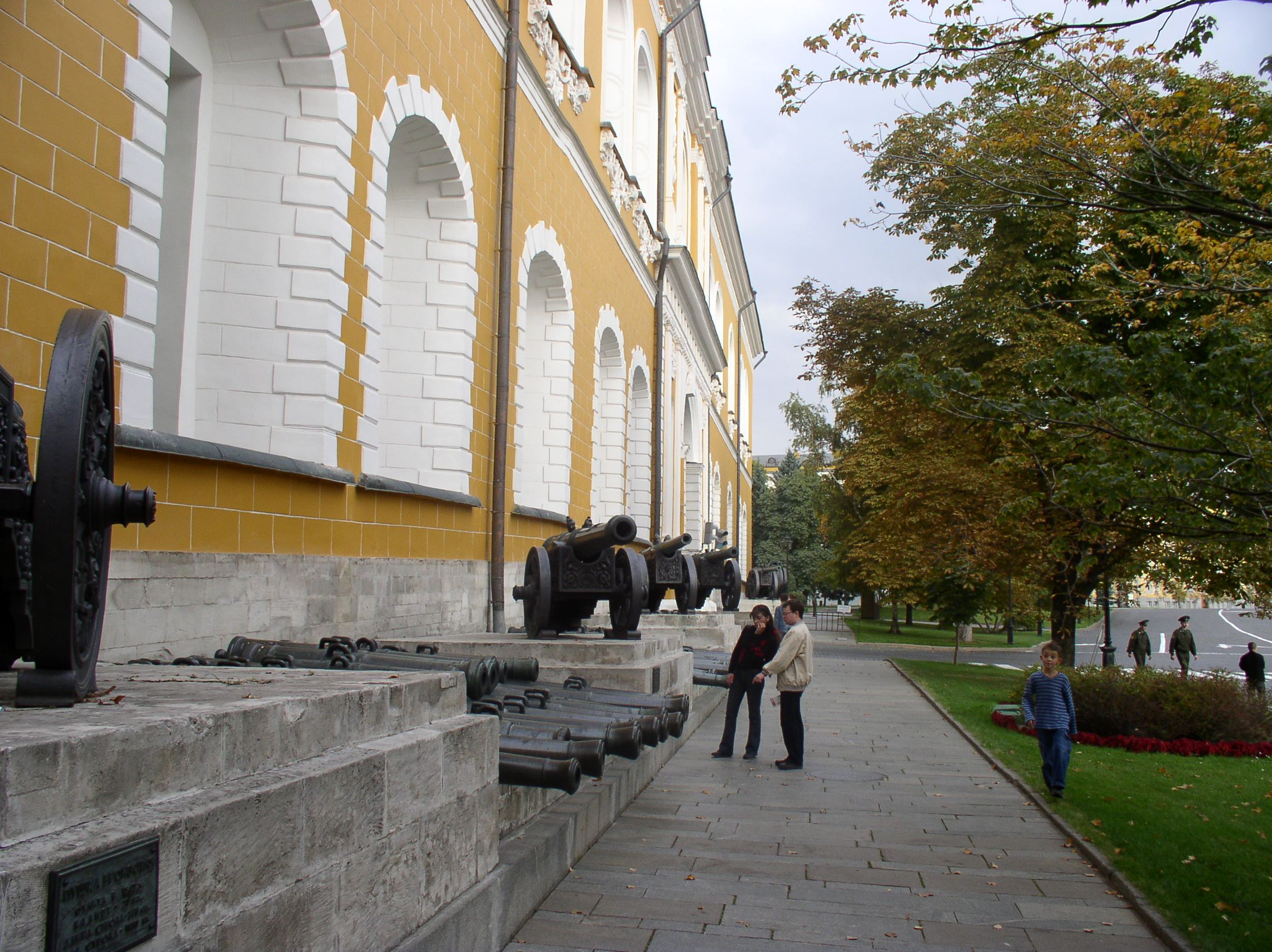
Cannons and mortars of Napoleon's army exhibited along the wall of the Kremlin Arsenal

The Royal Armoury, Leeds

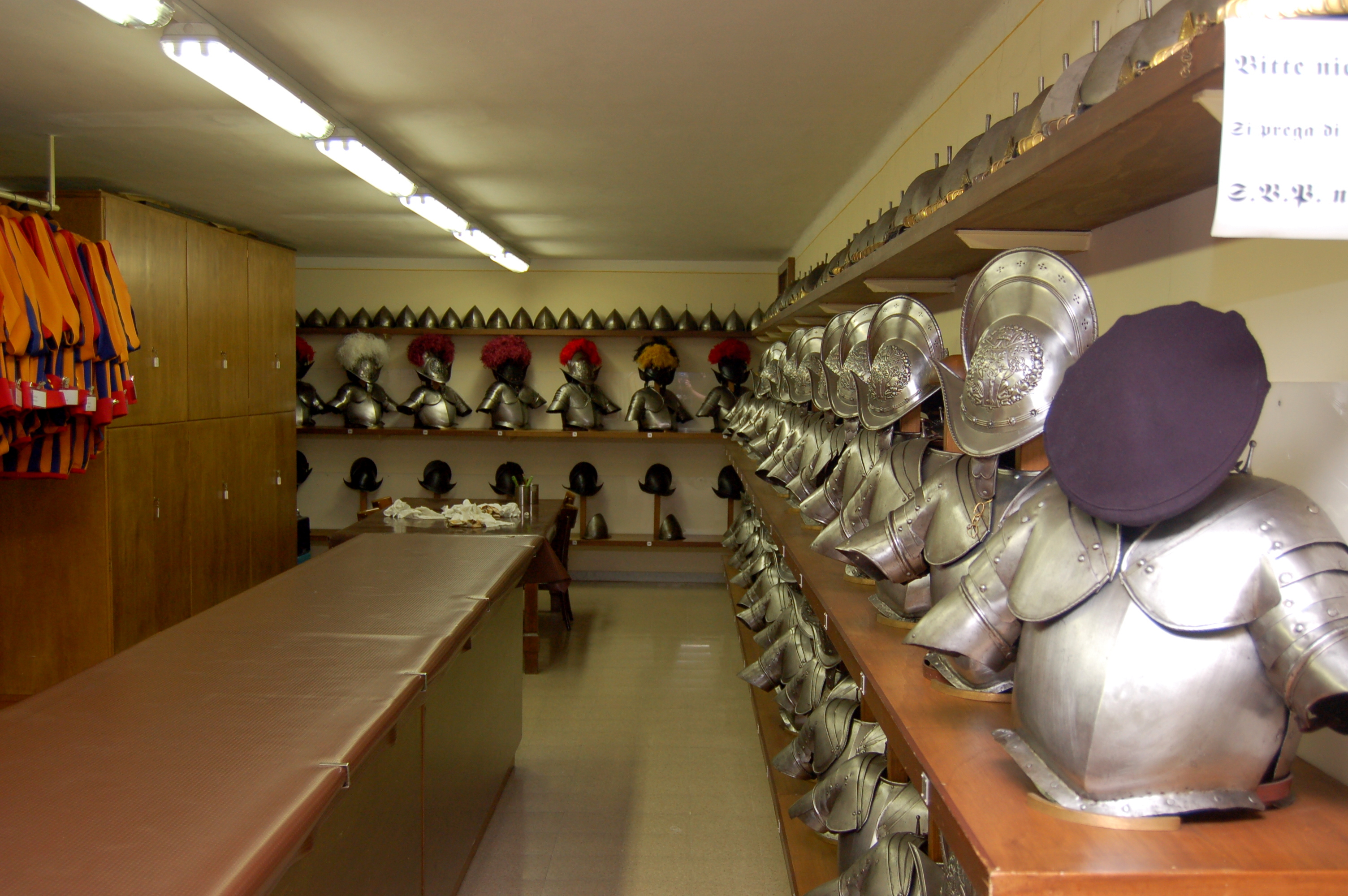
Armory of Swiss Guard

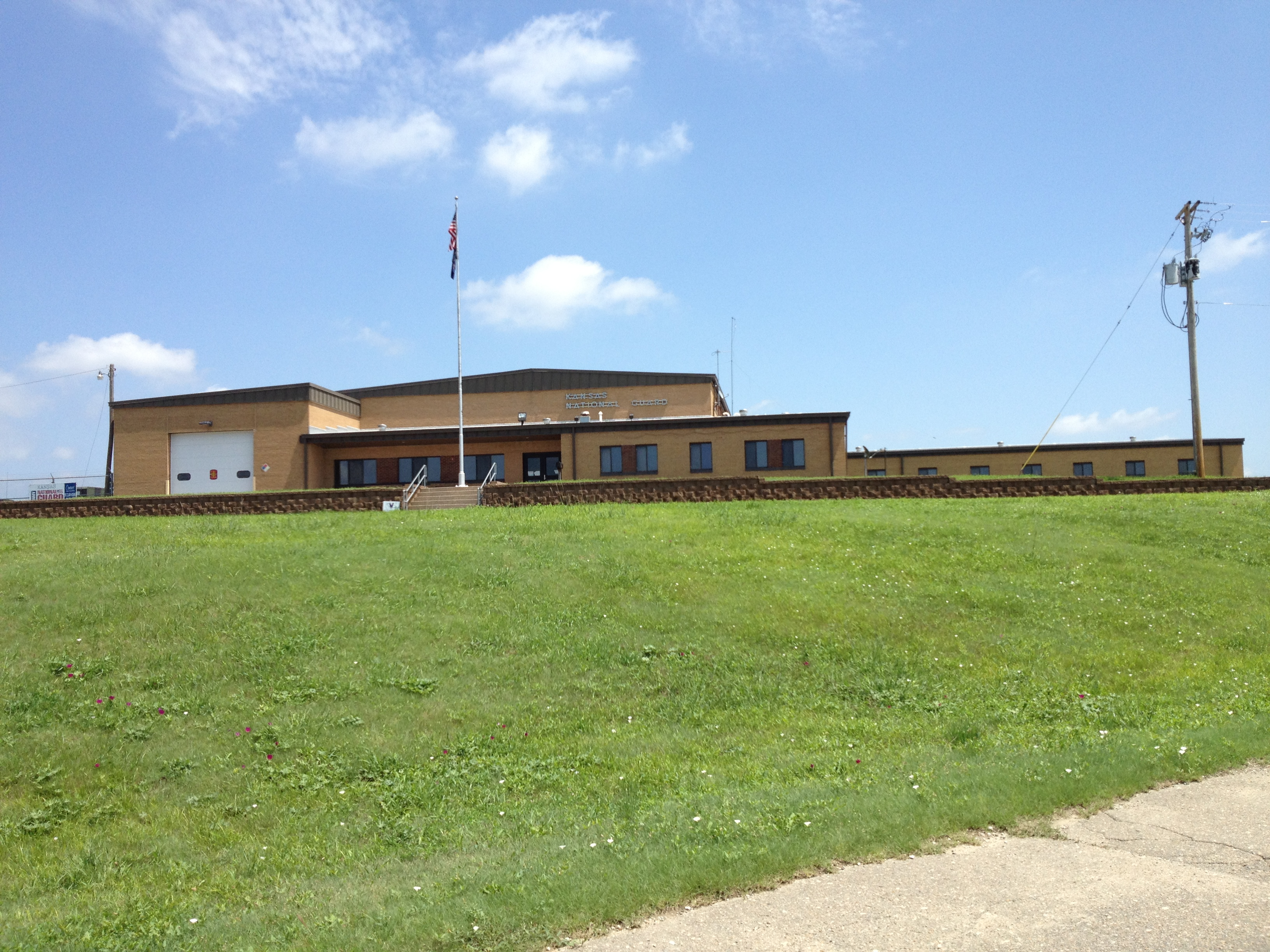
The Kansas Army National Guard armory in Concordia, Kansas, is a typical building used for the National Guard programs in the United States.

An arsenal is a place where arms and ammunition are made, maintained and repaired, stored, or issued, in any combination, whether privately or publicly owned. Arsenal and armoury (British English) or armory (American English) are mostly regarded as synonyms, although subtle differences in usage exist.

A sub-armory is a place of temporary storage or carrying of weapons and ammunition, such as any temporary post or patrol vehicle that is only operational in certain times of the day.

== Etymology ==
The term in English entered the language in the 16th century as a loanword from French: arsenal, itself deriving from the term Italian: arsenale, which in turn is thought to be a corruption of Arabic: دار الصناعة, dār aṣ-ṣināʿa, meaning "manufacturing shop".

== Types ==
A lower-class arsenal, which can furnish the materiel and equipment of a small army, may contain a laboratory, gun and carriage factories, and small-arms ammunition, small arms, harness, saddlery, tent and powder factories; in addition, it must possess great storehouses. In a second-class arsenal, the factories would be replaced by workshops. The situation of an arsenal should be governed by strategic considerations. If of the first class, it should be situated at the base of operations and supply, secure from attack, not too near a frontier, and placed so as to draw in readily the resources of the country. The importance of a large arsenal is such that its defences would be on the scale of those of a large fortress.

In the early 21st century, the term "floating armoury" described a ship storing weapons to be supplied to merchant vessels in international waters subject to piracy, so that the weapons do not enter territorial waters where they would be illegal.

Arsenal usually describes 100 or more weapons or firearms.

== Operational subdivision ==
The branches in a great arsenal are usually subdivided into storekeeping, construction and administration:

- Under storekeeping the arsenal should have the following departments and stores: Departments of issue and receipt, pattern room, armoury department, ordnance or park, harness, saddlery and accoutrements, camp equipment, tools and instruments, engineer store, timber yard, breaking-up store, and unserviceable store.
- Under construction: Gun factory, carriage factory, laboratory, small arms factory, harness and tent factory, gunpowder factory, etc. In a second-class arsenal there would be workshops instead of factories.
- Under the head of administration would be classed the chief director of the arsenal, officials military and civil, non-commissioned officers and military artificers, civilian foremen, workmen and laborers, with the clerks and writers necessary for the office work of the establishments.

In the manufacturing branches are required skill, and efficient and economical work, both executive and administrative; in the storekeeping part, good arrangement, great care, thorough knowledge of all warlike stores, both in their active and passive state, and scrupulous exactness in the custody, issue and receipt of stores. Frederick Taylor introduced command and control techniques to arsenals, including the U.S.'s Watertown Arsenal (a principal center for artillery design and manufacture) and Frankford Arsenal (a principal center for small arms ammunition design and manufacture).

== See also ==
- Armorer
- Arsenal Academy
- List of armouries in Canada
- List of arsenals of the Russian Armed Forces
- Magazine (artillery)
- Royal Armouries (UK)
- Zeughaus (Berlin)
