= Barsovo, Vladimir Oblast =

Barsovo Барсово
- Settlement
- Location within Vladimir Oblast Location within Russia
- Coordinates: 56°06′N 38°47′E
- Country: Russia
- Region: Vladimir Oblast
- District: Kirzhachsky District
- Time zone: UTC+3:00

Barsovo (Russian: Барсово) is a rural locality (a settlement) in Pershinskoye Rural Settlement, Kirzhachsky District, Vladimir Oblast, Russia. The population was 1,030 as of 2010. There are 2 streets.

On 22nd April 2025, the 51st Arsenal of the Main Missile and Artillery Directorate located at Barsovo suffered an explosion followed by fires and 450 residents were evacuated from nearby towns.

== Geography ==
Barsovo is located 12 km south of Kirzhach (the district's administrative centre) by road. Ileykino is the nearest rural locality.
