= Fire Information for Resource Management System =

Conflagration mapping platform developed by NASA

NASA FIRMS
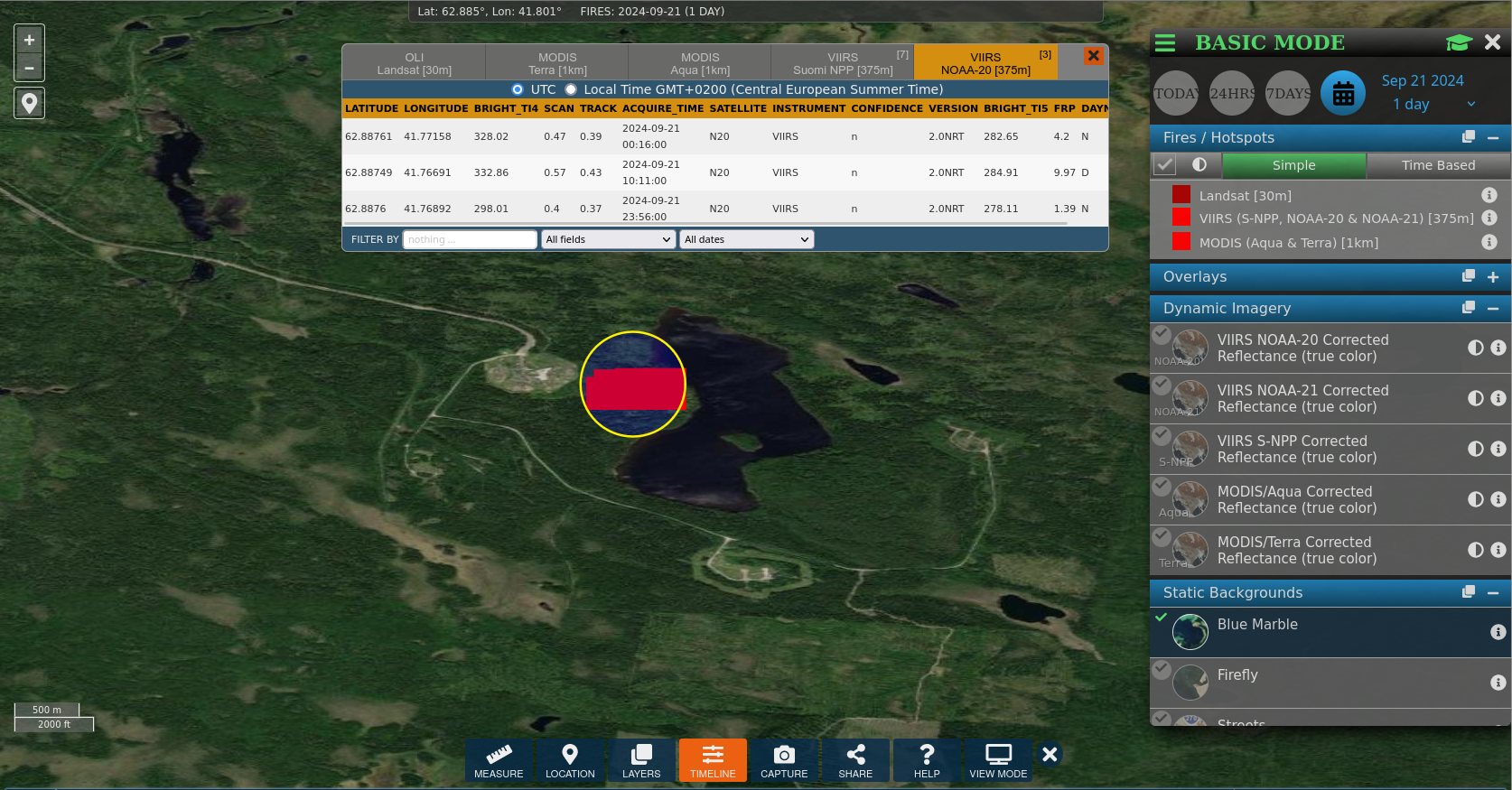
- Screenshot of NASA FIRMS in a web browser
- Website type: Web mapping
- Owner: NASA
- Website: https://www.earthdata.nasa.gov/firms
- Commercial: No
- Registration: No
- Launched: January 2021; 5 years ago
- Current status: Limited updates since October 1, 2025; 11 months ago

Fire Information for Resource Management System (FIRMS) is a free web mapping platform offered by NASA as part of its Earth Science Data Systems (ESDS) Program. It displays active fire locations in near real-time overlaid on a map.

While created to monitor wildfires, it has also been used to report on fires due to military conflicts such as the Russian invasion of Ukraine and the Tigray war.

== Specifications ==
=== Satellites ===
The data is collected via satellites in sun-synchronous orbit, making each satellite pass over the same location on Earth on the same time every day. Each satellite crosses the equator from North to South twelve times a day thus also from South to North twelve times a day.

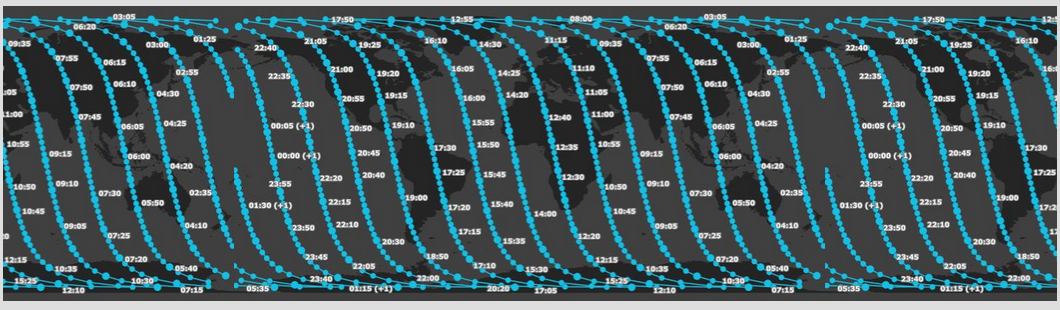
Aqua's ascending orbital path as of 2021

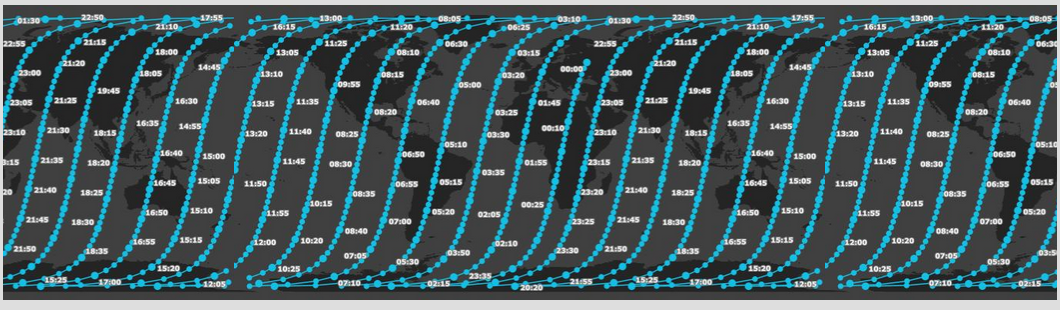
Aqua's descending orbital path as of 2021

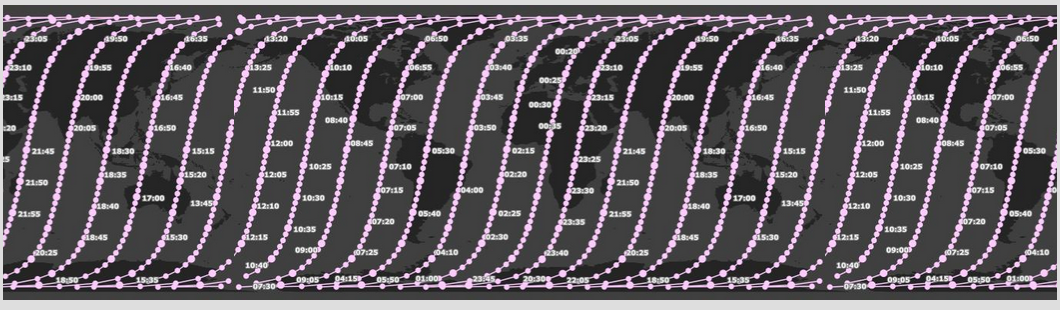
NOAA-20's descending orbital path

=== Instruments ===
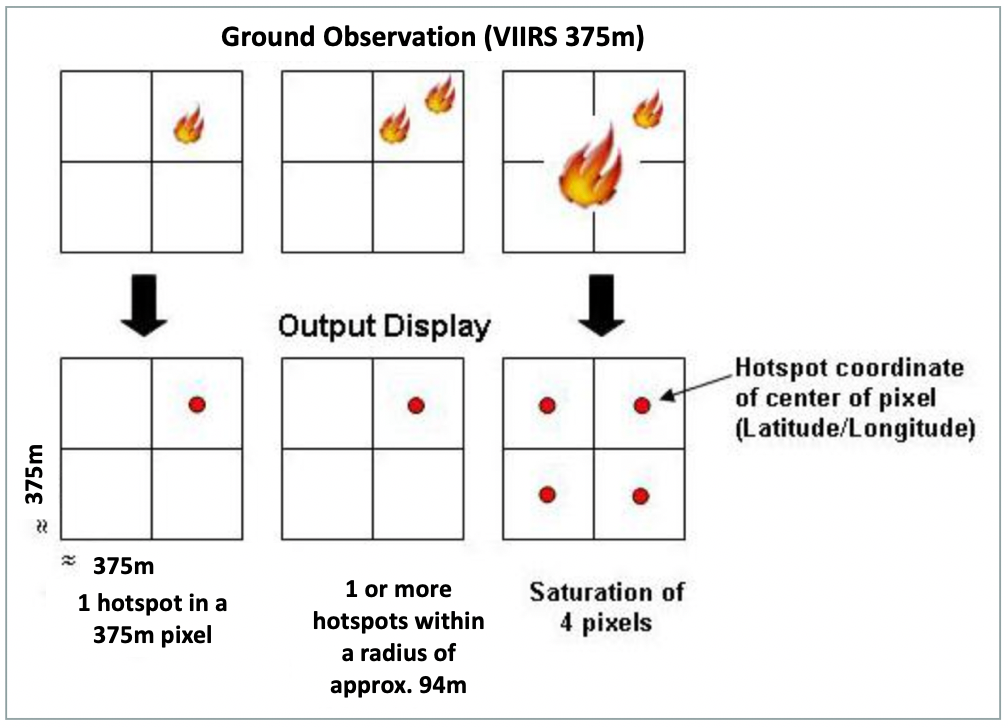
VIIRS spatial detection limits

The data is collected via MODIS (on board Terra and Aqua) and VIIRS (on board Suomi NPP, NOAA-20 and NOAA-21) satellite instruments. The spatial resolution of the MODIS instrument is 1 km × 1 km and 375 m × 375 m for VIIRS. This sets a lower limit on how accurately fires can be placed and whether a detection stems from a single larger or multiple smaller fires.

=== Website ===
The data collected by FIRMS are presented as a free web mapping service, with the active fire locations if any overlaid on a map. The detections are displayed on top of a static background layer and each visualized detection is clickable to display its data, such as detection time, coordinates, satellite and instrument. The default static background layer consists of higher resolution satellite imagery with terrain details called Blue Marble in reference to The Blue Marble.

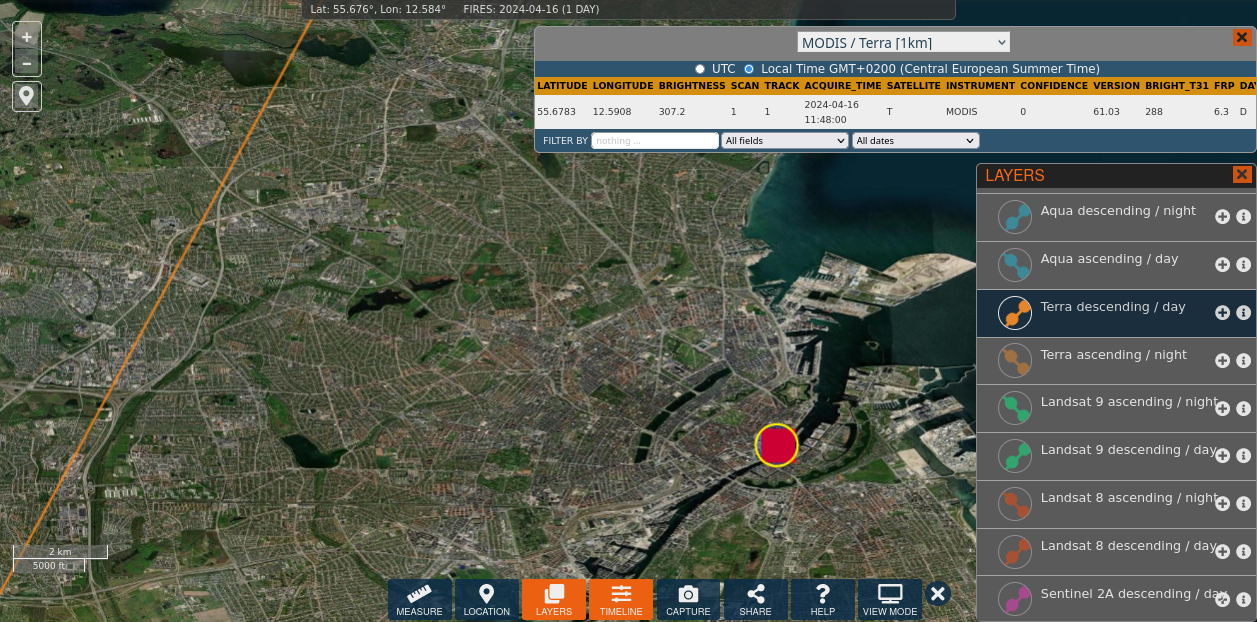
The 2024 Børsen fire detected at 11:48 local time by Terra on its descending pass, overlaid in orange

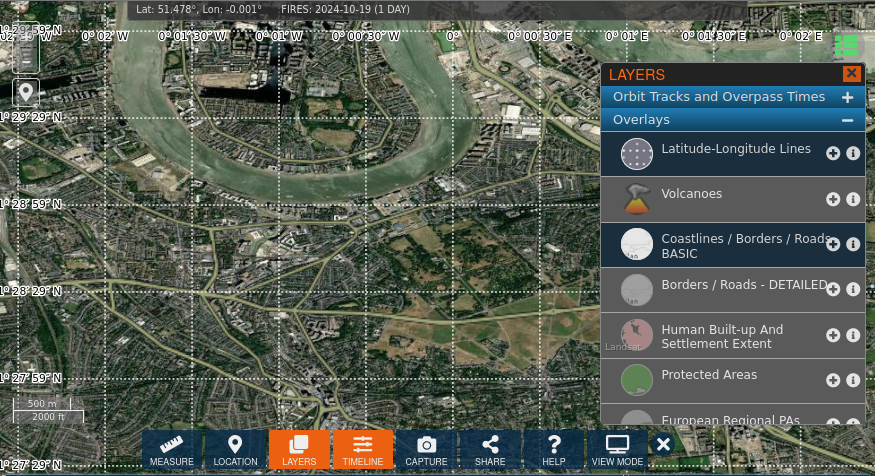
The Greenwich Meridian overlaid with latitude-longitude lines

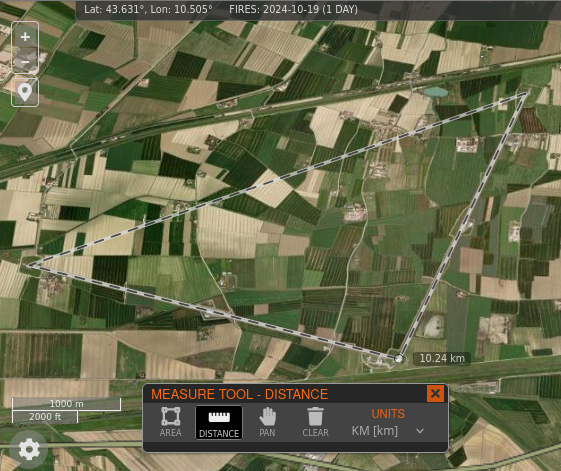
The FIRMS measurement tool calculates the length of a user defined sequence of connected line segments, here the isosceles right triangle of the Virgo interferometer with sides 3 km + 3 km + 3 √2 km ≈ 10.24 km

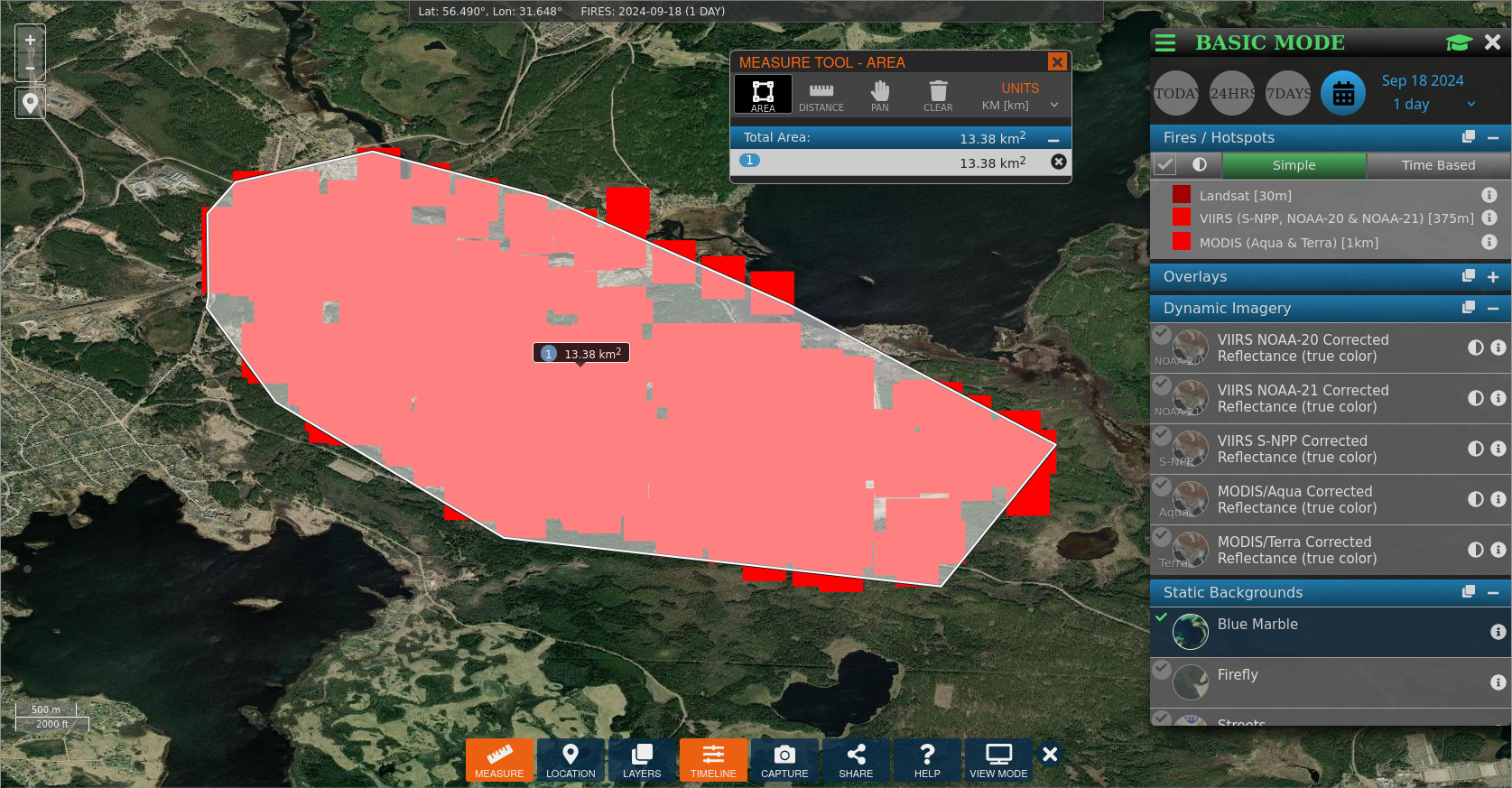
The FIRMS measurement tool calculates the area of a user defined polygon, here the Toropets depot explosions

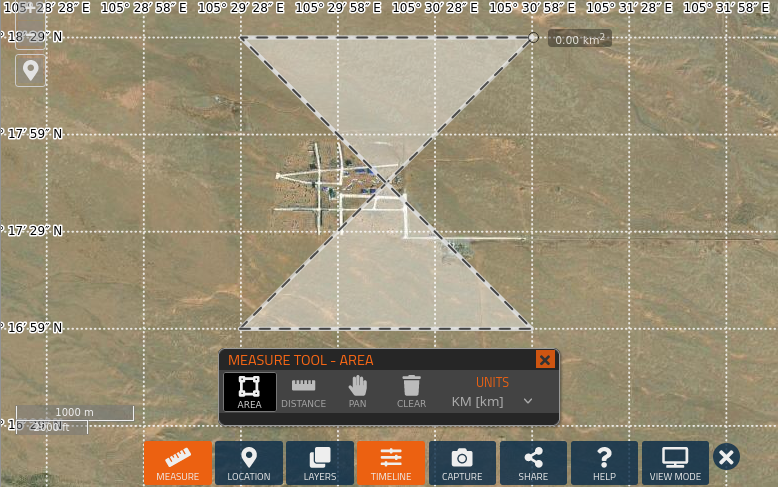
The FIRMS measurement tool calculates the area of a self-intersecting polygon such that e.g. a crossed square has zero area

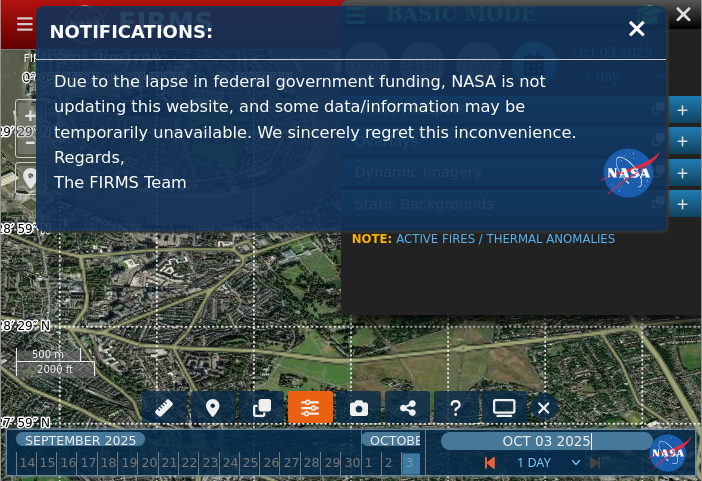
Service message following the 2025 United States federal government shutdown

== Development ==
FIRMS was developed by the University of Maryland in 2007 with NASA funds and from 2010 to 2012 a version of it was run by the UN's FAO.

On 31 January 2023 NASA entered into a Space Act agreement with GIS software company Esri. The purpose of the agreement is to further improve global access to NASA's geospatial data via Esri's ArcGIS software and via Open Geospatial Consortium data-formats.

== Thermal Anomaly vs Fire Detection ==
As they pass over Earth, the FIRMS satellites detect "thermal anomalies". This is any source of sufficiently intense heat, be it from a wildfire, a non-vegetation fire in a built-up area, a volcano or fire or other intense heat as an expected result of various industrial processes, such as oil refining or cement or steel production.

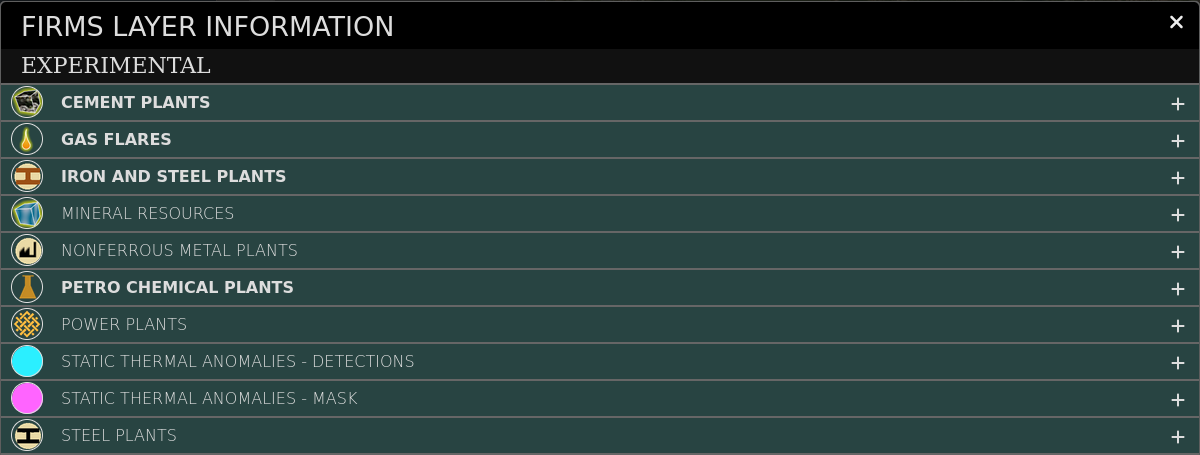
Industries that can cause FIRMS heat detections, e.g. oil refinery gas flares

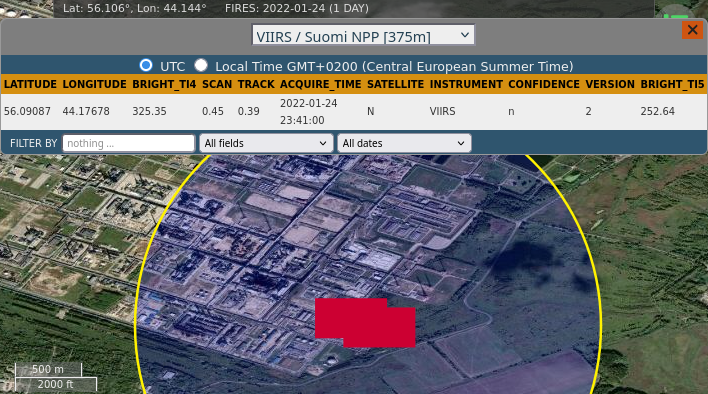
Two satellites detecting fire consistent with a gas flare at Kstovo refinery

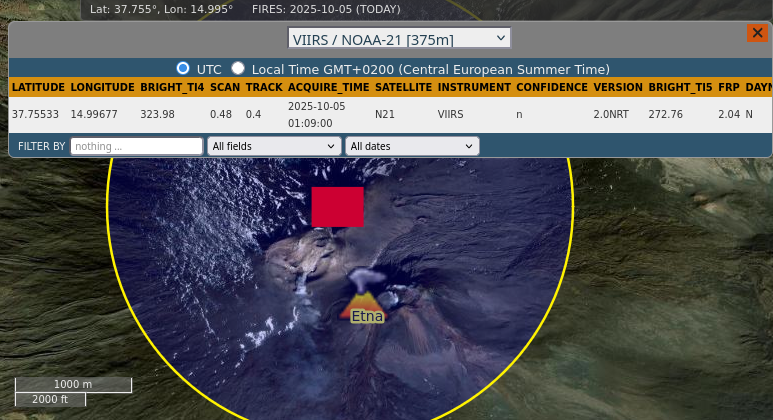
The FIRMS volcano layer at Mount Etna

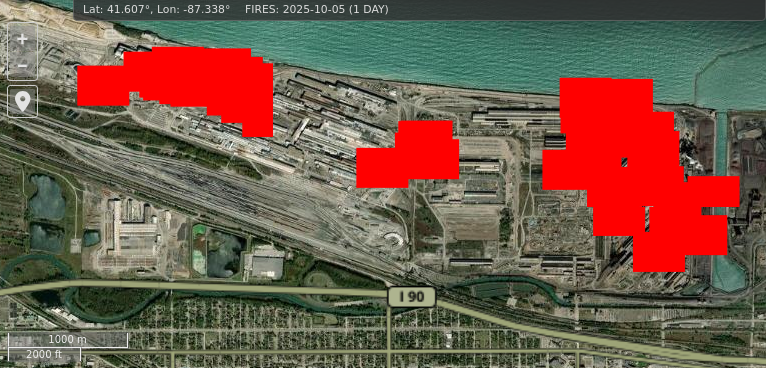
Intended heat sources at Gary Works

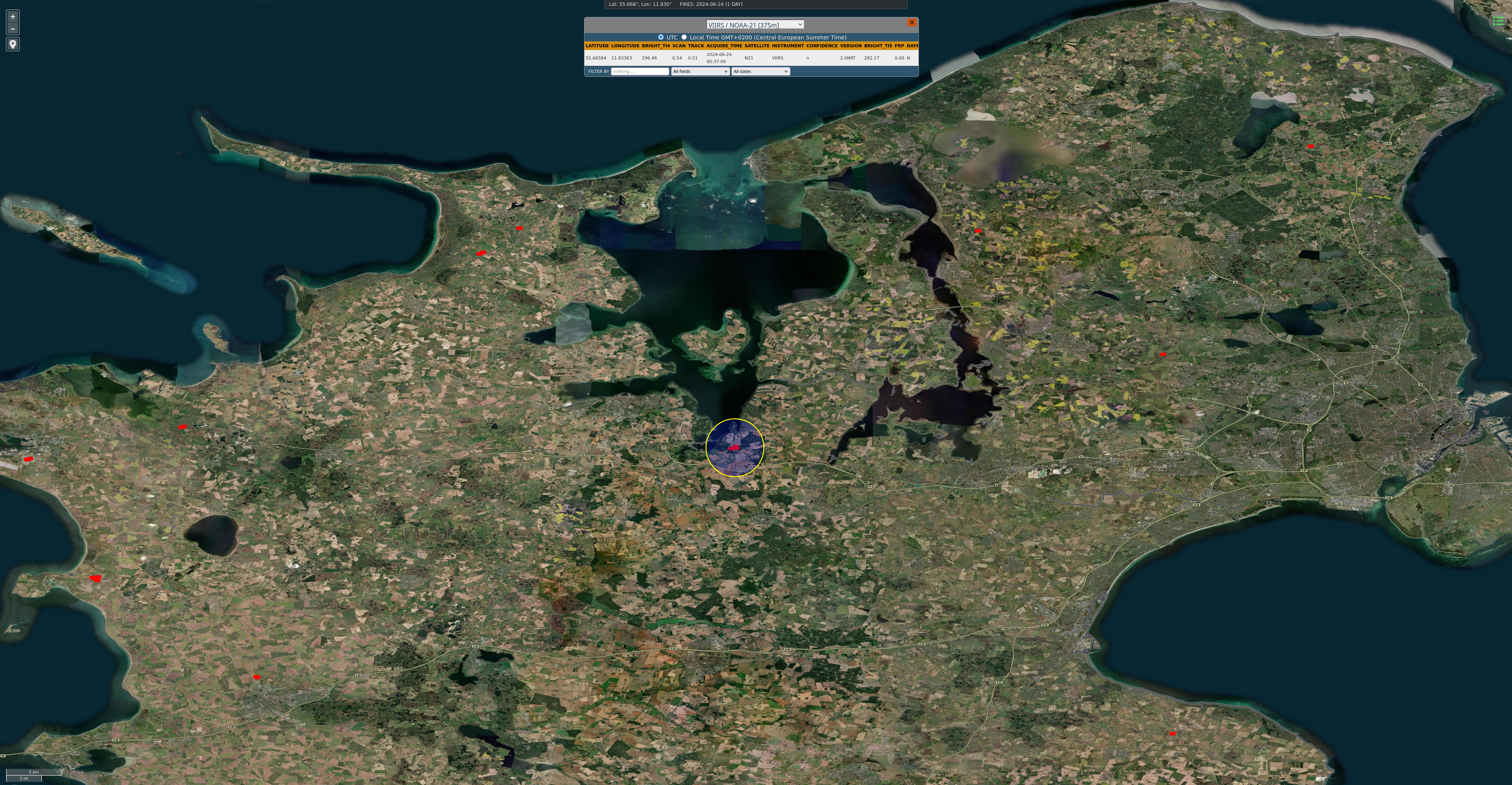
Fires on Zealand on Saint John's Eve

== See also ==
- NASA WorldWind
- Earth Observing System
