= Western Military District =

Former operational strategic command of the Armed Forces of the Russian Federation

Coordinates: 59.9381°N 30.3172°E

- Западный военный округ
- Emblem of the Western Military District
- Active: 20 October 2010–26 February 2024
- Country: Russia
- Branch: Russian Armed Forces
- Part of: Ministry of Defence
- Headquarters: General Staff Building, Saint Petersburg
- Decorations: Order of Lenin
- Website: Official website

Commanders
- Final Commander: Colonel General Yevgeny Nikiforov

Insignia
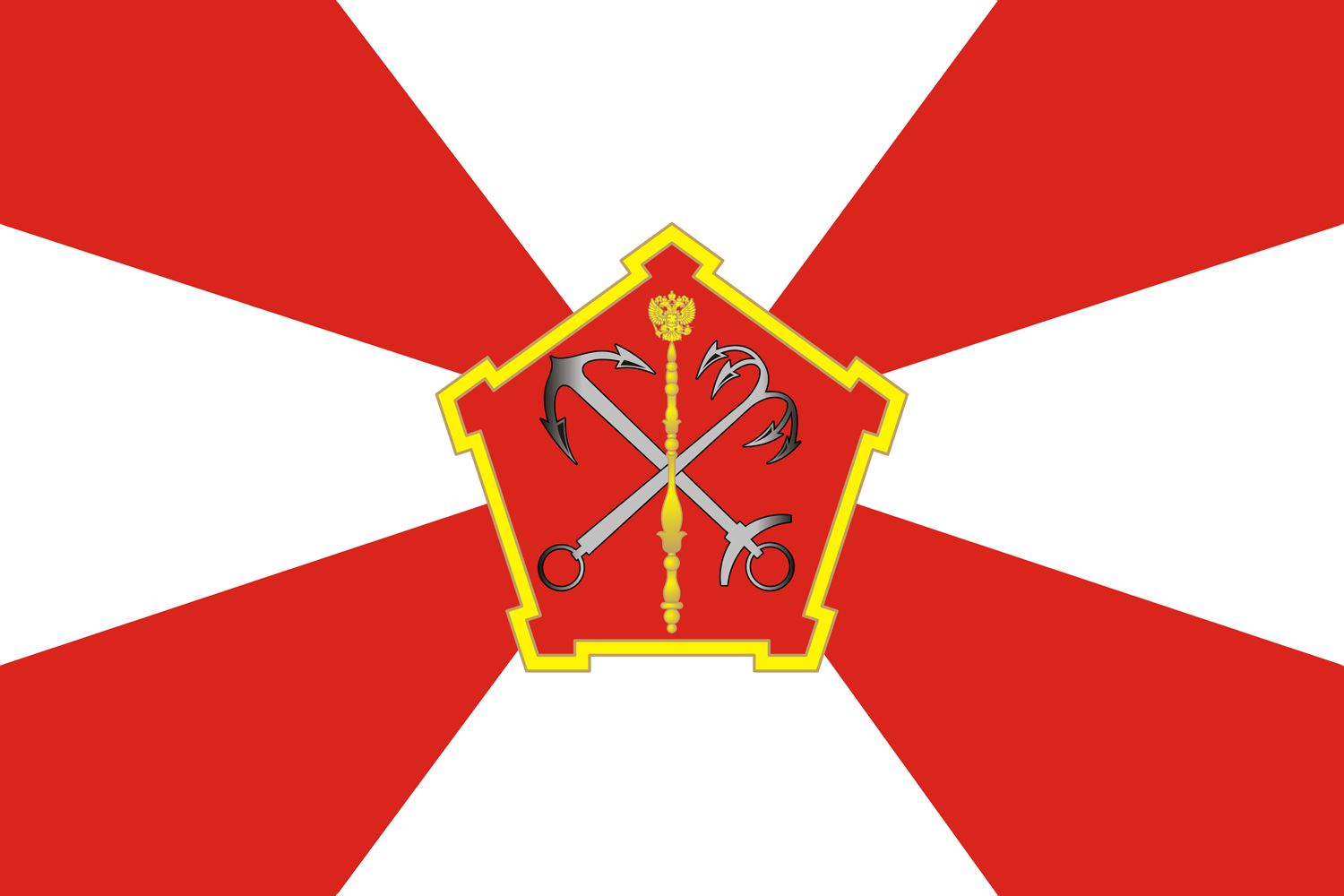
- Flag

The Western Military District, on a map of the five Russian military districts

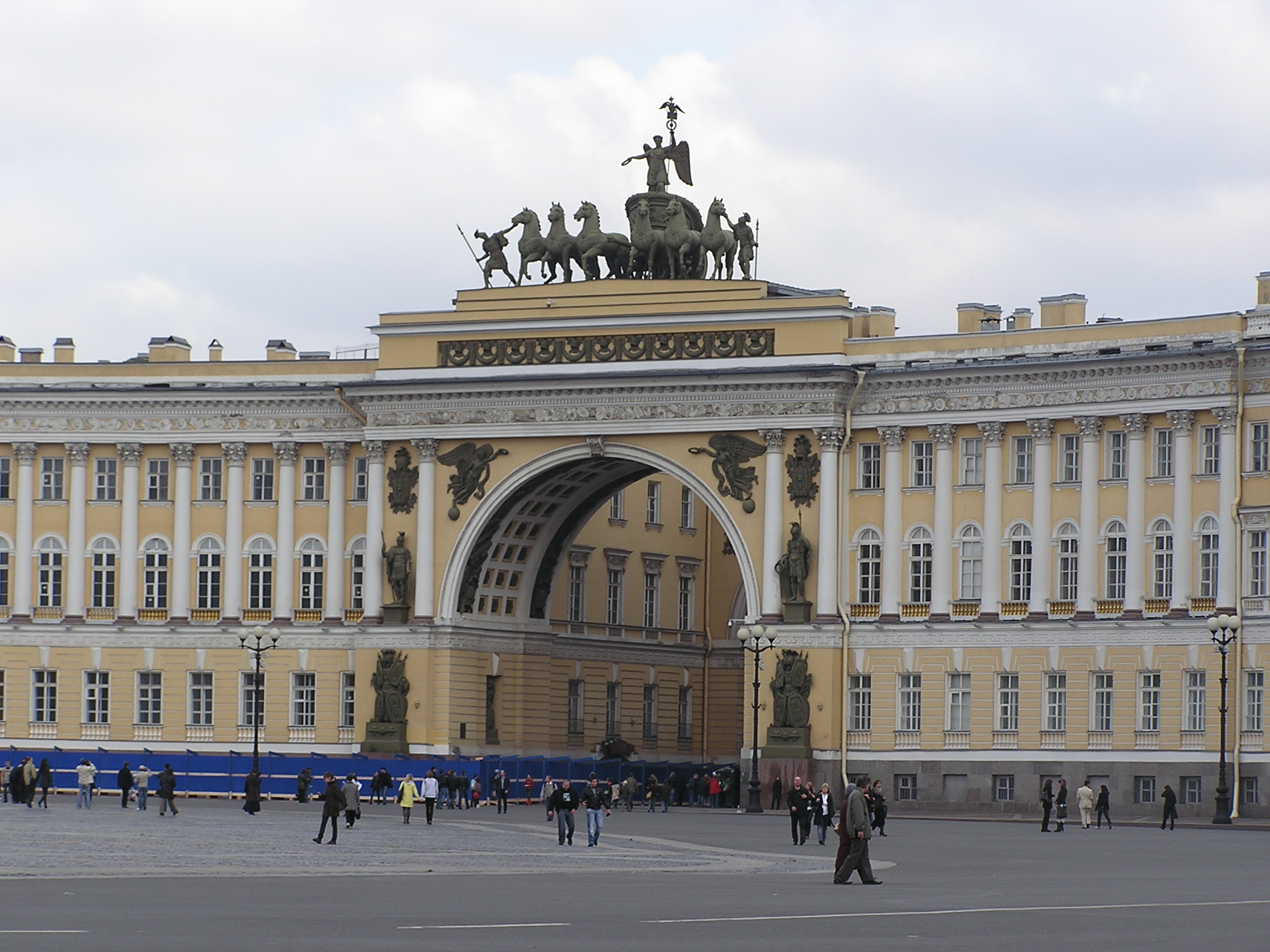
Western Military District HQ at the Saint Petersburg General Staff Building

The Western Military District (Russian: Западный военный округ, romanized: Zapadnyy voyennyy okrug) was a military district of Russia, in existence from 2010 until its abolishment as a unitary military command on February 26, 2024, succeeded by the newly reconstituted Moscow Military District and Leningrad Military District.

It was one of the five military districts of the Russian Armed Forces, with its jurisdiction primarily within the western central region of European Russia. The Western Military District was created as part of the 2008 military reforms, and founded by Presidential Decree №1144 signed on 20 September 2010, as an amalgamation of the Moscow Military District, Leningrad Military District and Kaliningrad Special Region. The district began operation on 20 October 2010, under the command of Colonel-General Valery Gerasimov. General Lieutenant Roman Berdnikov took over command on 3 October 2022, but two further command changes would take place by the end of the year, under the pressure of the Russian invasion of Ukraine.

The Western Military District was the second smallest military district in Russia by geographic size. The district contained 26 federal subjects of Russia: Belgorod Oblast, Bryansk Oblast, Ivanovo Oblast, Kaliningrad Oblast, Kaluga Oblast, Karelia, Kostroma Oblast, Kursk Oblast, Leningrad Oblast, Lipetsk Oblast, Moscow, Moscow Oblast, Nizhny Novgorod Oblast, Novgorod Oblast, Oryol Oblast, Pskov Oblast, Ryazan Oblast, Saint Petersburg, Smolensk Oblast, Tambov Oblast, Tver Oblast, Tula Oblast, Vladimir Oblast, Vologda Oblast, Voronezh Oblast, Yaroslavl Oblast. On 1 December 2014, the Arctic Joint Strategic Command was split off from the Western Military District, removing Arkhangelsk Oblast, Murmansk Oblast, Komi Republic, and the Nenets Autonomous Okrug, as well as the Russian Navy's Baltic Fleet and Northern Fleet, from the district's command.

The Western Military District was headquartered in the General Staff Building in Saint Petersburg.

The Western Military District, until its abolishment in February 2024, was led by Colonel General Yevgeny Nikiforov, who was previously Chief of Staff of the Eastern Military District.

Military units of the internal troops of the Ministry of Internal Affairs, the Border Troops of the FSB, as well as units of the Ministry of Emergency Situations and other ministries and departments of the Russian Federation performing tasks on the territory of the district are under its operational subordination.

== History ==
The Western Military District, "with about 300,000 troops, was formed in 2010 from the Moscow and Leningrad" Military Districts. When the Moscow and Leningrad Districts were merged, the Russian soldiers in Transnistria, the former Soviet 14th Guards Combined Arms Army, became part of the Western Military District. Of the 1,700 Russian Armed Forces soldiers in Transnistria by 2022, military sources in Chișinău said that only 70-100 were actually Russians; the rest were Transnistrians who were given contracts to serve in the Russian Armed Forces.

During the 2008–2012 military reform, the area of the Western Military District received the largest reduction in units and personnel. The number of motor rifle and tank battalions in the former Moscow Military District was reduced from 50 to 22.

On 26 February 2014, during the invasion of Crimea, President Vladimir Putin ordered the Russian Armed Forces to be "put on alert in the Western Military District as well as units stationed with the 2nd Army Central Military District Command involved in aerospace defense, airborne troops and long-range military transport." Despite media speculation it was for in reaction to the events in Ukraine, Russian defense minister Sergei Shoigu said it was unrelated to the unrest in Ukraine.

After a 15-year hiatus, the 1st Guards Tank Army headquarters was re-formed within the district in November 2014.

In April 2017, the Defence Ministry reported that the 14th Army Corps had been transferred to the Northern Fleet Joint Strategic Command. It appears that this army corps, formed with its number in view of the Second World War actions of the Soviet 14th Army, includes the 80th Arctic Motor Rifle Brigade and the 200th Motor Rifle Brigade.

In the September Zapad 2017 exercise, a significant portion of troops from the Western Military District numbering 12,700 personnel were involved in Belarus, the Kaliningrad Region and Russia's other north-western areas as well.

A December 2018 Russian Ministry of Defense press release said that an independent Spetsnaz company had been formed in a combined arms army of the district.

Almost the whole forces of the district became involved in the 2022 Russian invasion of Ukraine, suffering considerable losses (see Casualties of the Russo-Ukrainian War). The district's deployed force became the Western Grouping of Forces. A new army corps, the 3rd Army Corps, then began forming within the district. The 3rd Army Corps' main base and training centre was identified by Ukraine in August 2022 as being located in Mulino, Nizhny Novgorod Oblast. The new 72nd Separate Motor Rifle Brigade, intended to form part of the 3rd Army Corps, was reported by Penza Oblast authorities to be forming at Totskoye, Orenburg Oblast.

Much of the Russian Airborne Forces is located within the district's boundaries but not under its command. These forces include the 45th Guards Spetsnaz Brigade (Kubinka, Moscow); the 76th Guards Air Assault Division (Pskov); the 98th Guards Airborne Division (Ivanovo); the 106th Guards Airborne Division (Tula), and the VDV signals regiment, the 38th Airborne Signal Regiment (n. Bear Lake, Moscow Oblast). In addition, there are two formations of the Russian Aerospace Forces within the district's boundaries but under central command: the 1st Special Purpose Air and Missile Defense Army (Moscow SAM and ABM defences) and 15th Army of the Aerospace Forces of Special Purpose (space operations, the former Russian Space Command).

The Main Directorate of Intelligence (Ukraine) of the Ministry of Defence (Ukraine) on 26 December 2022 that General Yevgeny Nikiforov was appointed as commander, Western Military District, and commander of the Russian western grouping of forces in Ukraine. He had been transferred from the post of first deputy commander, Eastern Military District. In this transfer, Colonel-General Sergey Kuzovlev was removed from the position of commander of the troops of the Western Military District, after having only been in post for about a month. "The reason for Kuzovlev's dismissal was the failure of preparations for an offensive in the Lyman [area], but [Ukrainian intelligence assessed it also as a] internal political struggle.. because from the Shoigu-Gerasimov orbit changing for a candidate from the Surovikin-Prygozhin group.

== Formations and units ==
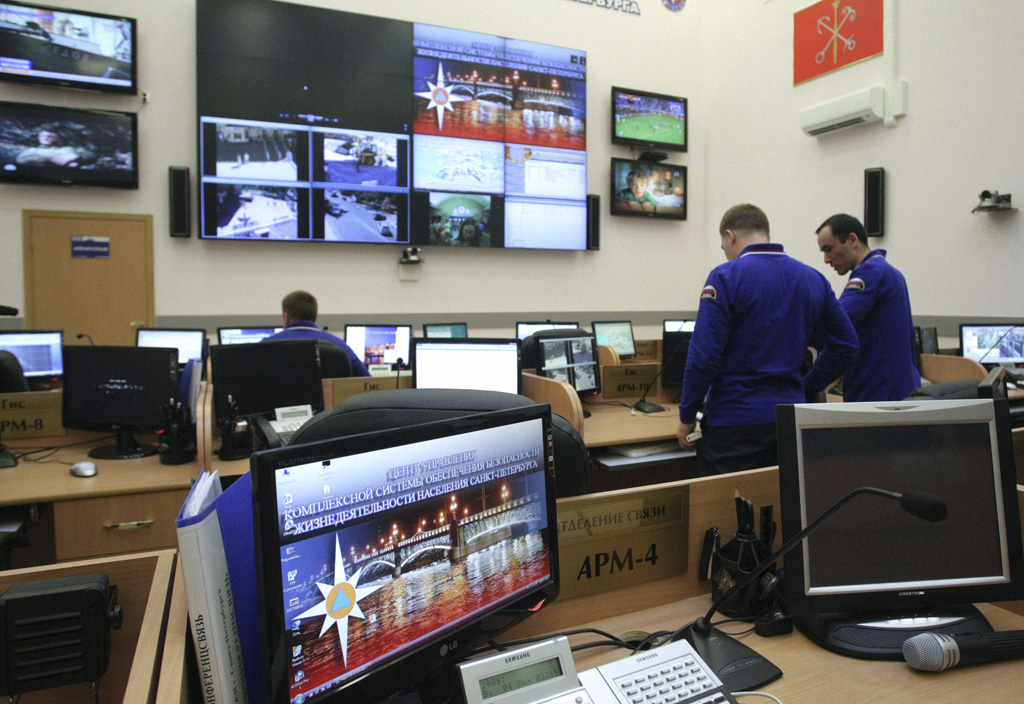
Russia's Comprehensive Security System Center in Saint Petersburg

=== Direct reporting units and formations ===
Muzyka 2020 lists a total of 21 direct reporting units and formations, but does not include the OGRF in Moldova, but does include Land Forces Command HQ, Moscow, and Joint Strategic Command - West at St Petersburg.

- Operational Group of Russian Forces in the Transnistrian region of the Republic of Moldova (Tiraspol, Transnistria)
  - 82nd Motorized Rifle Battalion
  - 113th Motorized Rifle Battalion
  - 540th Command Battalion
- 1st Command Brigade (Sertolovo, Leningrad Oblast) (ru:1-я бригада управления)
- 45th Guards Berlin Engineering Brigade, Russian Engineer Troops (Murom)
- 29th (Bryansk), 34th (Yaroslavl) and 38th Railway Brigades of the Russian Railway Troops
- 1st Guards Engineer-Sapper Brigade (Murom)
- 27th Brigade, Russian NBC Protection Troops (Shikhany)
- 79th Guards Rocket Artillery Brigade (Tver)
- 45th High-Power Artillery Brigade "Svir" (Tambov)
- 15th Electronic Warfare Brigade (Stroitel)
- 16th Electronic Warfare Brigade (Plavsk, says Galeotti 2017, Kursk-MZS, says Muzyka 2020)
- 146th Special Purpose Radio Engineer Brigade (Bugry)
- 45th Separate Engineer-Camouflage Regiment (HQ located in Vladimir Oblast; in late 2020 reported at Inzhenernyy 1, 55.793785, 37.192298). Military Unit Number 58142. The regiment's formation was completed in June 2017; as well as the ability to quickly camouflage key facilities, it has "“inflatable models of tanks, guns, infantry fighting vehicles, PVO [air defense] systems, and other weapons systems."

Muzkya 2020 does not include the:

- 154th Preobrazhensky Commandant's Regiment (Moscow)
- Semyonovsky Regiment (Ramensky District, Moscow Oblast)
- 132nd Signals Brigade
- 22nd Central Base for Reserve Tanks (Buy, Kostroma Oblast)
- 1060th Centre for Material-Technical Support (Pushkin, Saint Petersburg)

=== 1st Guards Tank Army ===
HQ: Odintsovo, Moscow Oblast (reinstated 2014)

- 4th Guards Tank Division (Naro-Fominsk)
- 47th Tank Division (Mulino)
- 2nd Guards Motor Rifle Division (Kalininets)
- 27th Guards Motor Rifle Brigade (Mosrentgen)
- 96th Reconnaissance Brigade
- 49th Anti-Aircraft Rocket Brigade
- 112th Rocket Brigade (Shuya)
- 288th Artillery Brigade
- 20th NBC Defense Regiment (p. Tsentralny, Nizhny Novgorod Oblast)
- 60th Control Brigade

=== 6th Combined Arms Army ===
HQ: Saint Petersburg

- 138th Guards Motor Rifle Brigade (Kamenka)
- 25th Guards Motor Rifle Brigade "Latvian Riflemen" (n. Vladimirsky Lager)
- 9th Guards Artillery Brigade (Luga)
- 268th Guards Artillery Brigade (Pushkin)
- 30th Engineering Regiment (Vsevolozhsk)
- 5th Anti-Aircraft Rocket Brigade (Gorelovo)
- 95th Administration and Command Brigade (Gorelovo)
- 26th Rocket Brigade (Luga)

=== 20th Guards Combined Arms Army ===
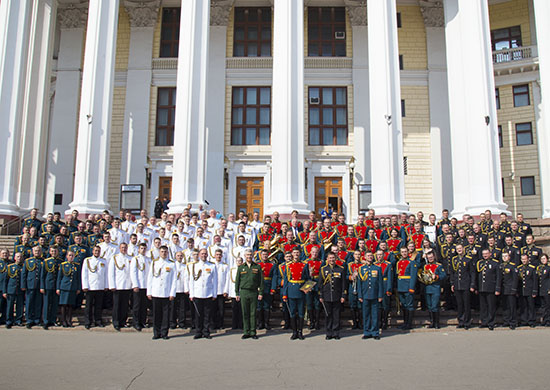
The bands of the Western Military District in their various uniforms.

HQ: Voronezh, Voronezh Oblast

- 3rd Motor Rifle Division (Boguchar)
  - 237th Tank Regiment (Valuyki and Soloti, Belgorod Oblast)
  - 752nd Guards Motor Rifle Regiment (Valuyki and Soloti, Belgorod Oblast)
  - 252nd Motor Rifle Regiment (Boguchar, Voronezh Oblast)
  - 99th Self-propelled Artillery Regiment (Boguchar, Voronezh Oblast)
  - 84th Reconnaissance Battalion (Valuyki and Soloti, Belgorod Oblast)
  - 159th Anti-Tank Battalion (Boguchar, Voronezh Oblast)
- 144th Guards Motor Rifle Division (Yelnya)
- 99th Weapons and Equipment Storage Base (Tver)
- 53rd Anti-Aircraft Rocket Brigade (Kursk)
- 236th Artillery Brigade
- 9th Administration Brigade
- 448th Rocket Brigade (Kursk)
- 7015th Weapons and Equipment Storage Base (Mulino)
- 69th Materiel Security Brigade

=== Intelligence/Spetsnaz units and formations ===
- 2nd Spetsnaz Brigade
- 16th Spetsnaz Brigade (Tambov)
- 322nd Special Forces Training Center

=== Naval Forces ===
- Baltic Fleet

==== Naval Infantry and Coast Defense ====
- 11th Army Corps (Kaliningrad)
  - 18th Guards Motorized Rifle Division: formed in December 2020 incorporating existing (and potentially new) regiments. As of 2021 ground combat units deployed within the 11th Corps include:
    - 275th Motorized Rifle Regiment
    - 280th Motorized Rifle Regiment
    - 79th Guards Motorized Rifle Regiment (former 79th Independent Guards Motorized Rifle Brigade re-formed as a regiment - Gusev, Kaliningrad Oblast)
    - 11th Independent Tank Regiment (Gusev, Kaliningrad Oblast) (Military Unit Number V/Ch (в/ч) 41611) (Equipped with T-72B Main Battle Tanks (upgrades of T-72s to B3M standard underway as of 2019/20)
    - 75th Motorized Rifle Regiment (reported forming as of 2021 in Sovetsk)
    - 20th Separate Reconnaissance Battalion (forming 2020-21; Orlan-10 UAVs and "Sobolyatnik" and "Fara-VR" reconnaissance radars)
    - 22nd Guards Air Defence Missile Regiment (Tor M1/M2), in Kaliningrad
  - 7th Independent Guards Motorized Rifle Regiment (Kaliningrad) (equipped with BMP-3 infantry fighting vehicles as of 2021; regiment reportedly retains independent status outside 18th Motorized Rifle Division)
  - 244th Artillery Brigade (2A36/BM-21/2S7M Malka self-propelled howitzers with Zoopark-1 counter-battery radars), BM-27 Uragan multiple rocket launchers (delivery initiated 2020) and 9P157-2 Khrizantema-S tank destroyers) in Kaliningrad
  - 336th Guards Naval Infantry Brigade (village Mechnikovo, Baltiysk) (Naval Infantry)
  - 25th Coastal Rocket Brigade with (BAL-E/K-300P Bastion-P), at Donskoye Air Base
  - 152nd Guards Missile Brigade (9K720 Iskander-M), at Chernyakhovsk Air Base
  - 73rd Bridge Battalion
  - 742th Fleet Signals Unit
  - 302nd Fleet Radio-Electronic Regiment

=== Aerospace Forces ===
- 6th Air and Air Defence Forces Army (HQ: St.Petersburg)
  - 105th Guards Composite Aviation Division
    - 159th Fighter Aviation Regiment (Petrozavodsk) (Two Squadrons: Sukhoi Su-35S)
    - 790th Fighter Aviation Regiment (Khotilovo) (Two Squadrons: Mikoyan MiG-31; One Squadron: Su-35)
    - 14th Guards Fighter Aviation Regiment (Kursk) (Two Squadrons: Sukhoi Su-30SM)
    - 47th Composite Guards Aviation Regiment (Voronezh) (Two Squadrons: Sukhoi Su-34)
    - 4th Reconnaissance Aviation Squadron (Shatalovo) (Sukhoi Su-24MR)
  - Naval Aviation (drawn from 132nd Mixed Aviation Division - Kaliningrad)
    - 689th Guards Fighter Aviation Regiment (Two Squadrons: Sukhoi Su-27P - planned to re-equip with the Su-35
    - 4th Naval Attack Aviation Regiment (One Squadron: Sukhoi Su-30SM; One Squadron: Su-24M)
  - 2nd Air Defence Division (St. Petersburg region)
    - 1488th Anti-Aircraft Missile Regiment (Zelenogorsk - S-400 SAM system)
    - 1489th Anti-Aircraft Missile Regiment (Vaganovo - S-400/Pantsir SAM systems)
    - 1490th Anti-Aircraft Missile Regiment (Ulyanovka - S-400 SAMs)
    - 500th Anti-Aircraft Missile Regiment (Gostilitsy - S-400/Pantsir SAMs)
    - 1544th Anti-Aircraft Missile Regiment (Vladimirsky Lager - S-400 SAMs)
  - 32nd Air Defence Division
    - 42nd Anti-Aircraft Missile Regiment (Izhitsy - S-300PM2 surface-to-air missile system)
    - 108th Anti-Aircraft Missile Regiment (Voronezh - S-300PM2 SAMs)
  - 44th Air Defence Division of the Baltic Fleet (Kaliningrad region)
    - 183rd Anti-Aircraft Missile Regiment (Gvardeysk - S-400/S-300/Pantsir SAMs)
    - 1545th Anti-Aircraft Missile Regiment (Kruglovo - S-400 SAMs)

=== Russian Aerospace Forces - Not Subordinate to Western Military District ===
Neither of these Russian Aerospace Forces armies are subordinated to the Western Military District.

- 1st Air Defence and Missile Defence Army (air defence of Moscow)
  - 4th Air Defence Division
    - 584th Anti-Aircraft Missile Regiment (Mar'ino - S-300PM SAMs)
    - 210th Anti-Aircraft Missile Regiment (Dubrovki - S-400/Pantsir SAMs)
    - 93rd Anti-Aircraft Regiment (Fun'kovo - S-400/S-300/Pantsir SAMs)
    - 612th Anti-Aircraft Missile Regiment (Krasnoznamensk - S-300 SAMs)
  - 202nd Anti-Aircraft Missile Brigade (Naro-Fominsk - S-300 SAMs)
  - 5th Air Defence Division
    - 549th Ant-Aircraft Missile Regiment (Il'inskoye - S-400/Pantsir SAMs)
    - 614th Anti-Aircraft Missile Regiment (Pestovo - S-300 SAMs)
    - 629th Anti-Aircraft Missile Regiment (Elektrostal - S-300 SAMs)
    - 606th Anti-Aircraft Missile Regiment (Elektrostal - S-400/S-300/Pantsir SAMs)
  - 9th Anti-Ballistic Missile Defence Division (A-135 anti-ballistic missile system)
- 15th Special Aerospace Forces Army (Moscow-based special Command of Russian Aerospace forces and responsible for cosmodromes and space-monitoring stations) reportedly receiving S-500 SAM/ABM system as of summer 2021

== Leadership ==
=== Commanders ===
- Colonel-General Valery Gerasimov (20–28 October 2010 (acting))
- Colonel-General Arkady Bakhin (28 October 2010 – 9 November 2012)
- Colonel-General Anatoly Sidorov (24 December 2012 – 10 November 2015)
- Colonel-General Andrey Kartapolov (10 November 2015 – 19 December 2016)
- Lieutenant-General Viktor Astapov (19 December 2016 – April 2017 (acting))
- Colonel-General Andrey Kartapolov (April 2017 – 30 July 2018)
- Lieutenant-General Viktor Astapov (30 July – November 2018 (acting))
- Colonel-General Alexander Zhuravlyov (November 2018 – June 2022)
- Lieutenant General Andrei Sychevoi, (June 2022 – dismissed by 4 September 2022)
- Colonel-General Roman Berdnikov (3 October – 26 December 2022)
- Colonel-General Sergey Kuzovlev (13–26 December 2022)
- Lieutenant General (later Colonel General) Yevgeny Nikiforov (26 December 2022 – 1 March 2024)

=== Chiefs of Staff - First Deputy Commanders ===
- Admiral Nikolai Maksimov (28 October 2010 – October 2012)
- Lieutenant-General Andrey Kartapolov (December 2012 – 21 June 2014)
- Lieutenant-General Viktor Astapov (21 June 2014 – February 2019)
- Lieutenant-General Aleksey Zavizon (February 2019 – 1 March 2024)

== See also ==
- List of military airbases in Russia
