= Leningrad Military District =

Military district of the Russian Armed Forces

- Ленинградский военный округ
- Great emblem of the Leningrad Military District
- Founded: Historic: 6 August 1864; Current: 26 February 2024
- Country: (Russia) Russian Empire (1864–1917); RSFSR (1917–1922); Soviet Union (1922–1991) (Russia) Russian Federation (1991–2010; 2024–present)
- Branch: Russian Ground Forces
- Type: Military district
- Part of: Ministry of Defence
- Headquarters: General Staff Building, Saint Petersburg
- Engagements: Russo-Turkish War of 1877–8; World War I October Revolution; Russian Civil War; World War II; Russian invasion of Ukraine
- Decorations: Order of Lenin

Commanders
- Commander: Colonel General Yevgeny Nikiforov

The Order of Lenin Leningrad Military District (Russian: Ордена Ленина Ленинградский военный округ) is a military district of the Armed Forces of the Russian Federation. The district was awarded the Order of Lenin in 1968. In 2010, it was merged with the Moscow Military District, the Northern Fleet and the Baltic Fleet to form the new Western Military District. In December 2022, Defense Minister Sergey Shoigu proposed to reestablish it along with the Moscow Military District, a decision confirmed in June 2023 by Deputy Chief of the General Staff Yevgeny Burdinsky. On December 17, 2023, Russian president Vladimir Putin announced plans to recreate the Leningrad Military District as a reaction to Finland joining NATO. The district was formally reconstituted on 26 February 2024 by a Presidential Decree No.141, transferring the Northern Fleet under its command.

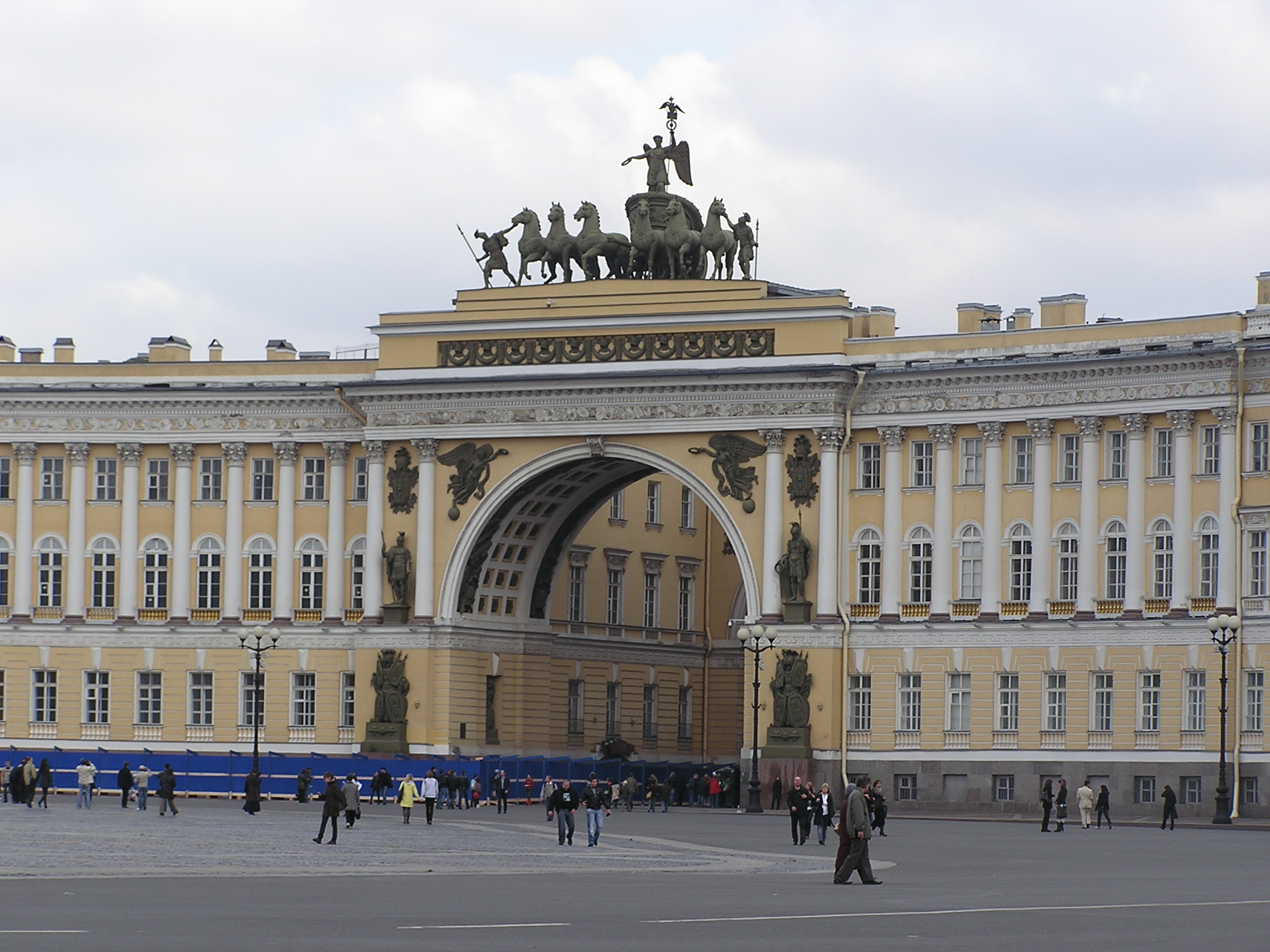
Leningrad Military District HQ at the Saint Petersburg General Staff Building.

It is one of five military districts of the Russian Armed Forces, with its jurisdiction primarily within the western central region of European Russia. The Leningrad Military District contains 11 federal subjects of Russia: the Republic of Karelia, the Komi Republic, Arkhangelsk, Vologda, Kaliningrad, Leningrad, Murmansk, Novgorod and Pskov oblasts, Saint Petersburg, and the Nenets Autonomous District. Additionally, the command contains most of Russia's islands in the Arctic Ocean, including those located in federal subjects not within the district. It lies in the Northwestern Federal District.

Military units of the internal troops of the Ministry of Internal Affairs, the FSB Border Service of Russia, as well as units of the Ministry of Emergency Situations and other ministries and departments of the Russian Federation performing tasks on the territory of the district are under its operational subordination.

Colonel General Aleksandr Lapin took over as the new district's commander on 16 May 2024. On 21 September 2025, Colonel General Yevgeny Nikiforov was appointed as commander of the Leningrad Military District instead of Lapin.

== History ==
=== Early history ===
The district was founded in 1864 as the Petersburg Military District in the Russian Empire during the military district reform of that year. After World War I began Saint Petersburg was renamed Petrograd and the district also changed its name to the Petrograd Military District.

The Leningrad Military District was originally formed as the Petrograd Military District after the October Revolution of 1917 up to the beginning of the formation of the Red Army. The Petrograd District was reestablished as a part of the Red Army (RKKA) by an order of the Highest Military Council of 6 September 1918. On 1 February 1924, the Petrograd military district was renamed the Leningrad Military District when the city was renamed Leningrad. The district included Leningrad, Pskov, Novgorod, Olonets, Cherepovets, and Murmansk Governorates and the Karelian SSR. In 1927 the governorates were merged into the new Leningrad Oblast, with the territory of the district remaining the same between the wars.

By 1935 the district included the 1st Rifle Corps at Novgorod with the 16th and 56th Rifle Divisions, and the 19th Rifle Corps at Leningrad with the 4th Turkestan and 20th Rifle Divisions. The 19th Rifle Corps also included the Separate Karelian Rifle Brigade and Separate Murmansk Rifle Regiment.

Markian Popov was appointed District Commander in 1939. Its main purpose was the defence of the Kola Peninsula and the northern shores of the Gulf of Finland. On the right flank it bordered with the Arkhangelsk Military District, on the left — with the Baltic MD. Among the defensive works started in the 1930s to protect the frontiers was the Karelian Fortified Region.

=== World War II ===
The Winter War of 1939–40 with Finland prompted a close examination of the combat performance of the District's troops, and for the better control of the 7th and 13th Armies the North-Western Front was formed from the staff of the District on 7 January 1940. Three and a half months later the Front was dissolved back into the District headquarters.

On June 9, 1940, directive 02622ss/ov was given to the District by Semyon Timoshenko to be ready by June 12 to (a) capture the vessels of the Estonian, Latvian and Lithuanian Navy in their bases and/or at sea; (b) Capture the Estonian and Latvian commercial fleet and all other vessels; (c) Prepare for an invasion and landing in Tallinn and Paldiski; (d) Close the Gulf of Riga and blockade the coasts of Estonia and Latvia in Gulf of Finland and Baltic Sea; (e) Prevent an evacuation of the Estonian and Latvian governments, military forces and assets; (f) Provide naval support for an invasion towards Rakvere; (g) Prevent the Estonian and Latvian airplanes flying either to Finland or Sweden.

On 22 June 1941 the District comprised the 7th Army, the 14th Army, the 23rd Army, the 1st Mechanised Corps (-), 177th Rifle Division, 191st Rifle Division, 8th Rifle Division, the 21st, 22nd, 25th, 29th Fortified Regions, Air Forces (six aviation divisions, including the 1st, 2nd, 5th, 39th, 41st, and 55th), and other formations and units.

Two days after the German invasion of the Soviet Union, on 24 June 1941, the District was reorganised as the Northern Front, and two months later, on 23 August 1941, it was split into the Leningrad and Karelian Fronts. The Front's forces efforts played a major part in resisting the German attacks during the Siege of Leningrad.

By the joint efforts of troops of the Leningrad Front, Volkhov Front, and the 2nd Baltic Front during January 1944 the Leningrad–Novgorod Offensive ended the siege of the city. Pressing home the attack, the forces of the Leningrad Front in summer and in the fall of 1944 helped seize Estonia, Latvia, and Lithuania. The Front was reorganized under the Leningrad District into a peacetime status on 9 July 1945. Marshal Leonid Govorov took command shortly afterwards.

=== Cold War ===
Boundaries of the Leningrad Military District (in red) on 1 January 1989

The reestablished district was responsible for the Estonian SSR, Leningrad, Pskov, and Novgorod Oblasts. Initially the district controlled two combined arms armies: the 10th Guards in Estonia and the 23rd on the Karelian Isthmus. The 10th Guards Army was reduced to the 4th Guards Rifle Corps in April 1948, and that of the 23rd Army disbanded as a result of the postwar demobilization. The district was thus left with the 4th Guards Rifle Corps, the 30th Guards Rifle Corps, the 2nd Guards Tank Division, and the 1st and 2nd Machine Gun Artillery Divisions. Control of forces in the Estonian SSR, which included the 4th Guards Rifle Corps with three divisions, was transferred to the Baltic Military District on 27 January 1956.

By 1946 the 2nd Guards Artillery Division had arrived at Pushkin, which would be its headquarters for nearly the next fifty years. The 13th Air Army was the district air force component and was redesignated as the 76th Air Army in 1949. General-Colonel of Aviation Fyodor Polynin was the first commander of the 76th Air Army. Apart from a brief period when the air army was redesignated the Air Forces of the Leningrad Military District from 1980 to 1988, the 76th Air Army would be active in the region until 1998.

In Arkhangelsk, Arkhangelsk Oblast, the 44th Special Rifle Corps was activated on 22 June 1956 from HQ Arkhangelsk Military District.

The 2nd Guards Tank Division was transferred to the district from the Estonian SSR in 1958, based at Garbolovo and Vladimirsky Lager.

In June 1957 44th Special Rifle Corps was renamed the 44th Special Army Corps. Three years later it comprised the 69th and 77th Motor Rifle Divisions. In August 1961, it was renamed the 44th Army Corps.

In May 1960 the Northern Military District, controlling forces in the Karelian and Komi ASSRs, and Arkhangelsk, Murmansk and Vologda Oblasts, was subsumed into the Leningrad Military District. Accordingly, Headquarters Northern Military District became Headquarters 6th Combined Arms Army. That year, the 37th Guards Motor Rifle Division of the 30th Guards Army Corps was reorganized as the district's motor rifle training division, returning to its wartime designation as the 63rd Guards in 1964. In the late 1960s the 14th Separate Machine Gun Artillery Regiment of the 30th Guards Army Corps was used to create the mobilization 37th Motor Rifle Division.

In 1962 the troops of the district participated in Operation Anadyr, the Soviet military deployment to Cuba that resulted in the Cuban Missile Crisis. As a result of tensions with China in the late 1960s, the headquarters of the 44th Army Corps, 2nd Guards Tank Division, the 279th Motor Rifle Regiment of the 54th Motor Rifle Division and other units were sent to the Far East. In 1967 the 44th Army Corps was moved to the Transbaikal Military District and established its headquarters at Ulan Ude. New units were formed to replace them, with the 26th Army Corps headquarters replacing the 44th, and a reshuffling of units to replace the 279th Regiment: the 221st Guards Motor Rifle Regiment of the 77th Guards Motor Rifle Division replaced the 279th in the 54th Motor Rifle Division. In turn the new 481st Motor Rifle Regiment was formed to complete the 77th Guards. During the 1970s and 1980s the 6th Combined Arms Army and the 30th Guards and 26th Army Corps were based in the territory of the district.

General, later Marshal, Sergei Sokolov assumed command in 1965. Marshal Sokolov later became the Minister of Defence in 1984. On 22 February 1968, in conjunction with the 50th anniversary of the Soviet Army and for its successes in combat and in political training, the District was awarded the Order of Lenin.

On 3 June 1968 the District was placed on alert. The Norwegian Army raised its alert levels in response. Within a couple of days the mobilized forces in the Leningrad region reached 11,000 soldiers, 4,000 naval infantry, 210 tanks, 500 troop transports, 265 self-propelled cannons, 1,300 logistics transports, 50 helicopters and 20 Antonov An-12 transport aircraft, all of which were staged in the Petchenga-Murmansk area near Norway. On the evening of 7 June, the Norwegian Garnisonen i Sør-Varanger garrison heard the noise of powerful engines coming from the manoeuvres along the entire Soviet front of the Norwegian-Soviet border. Actual observations were not possible over the border in the dark. On that same night the GSV commanding officer ordered all GSV reserve forces to report to their emergency muster locations. The Soviet demonstration of strength lasted until 10 June, when the Soviet forces stood down.

In 1979, Scott and Scott reported the headquarters address as Leningrad, L-13, Pod'ezdnoy Per., Dom 4.

In 1988 the district's forces were reported as consisting of the 6th Army (Petrozavodsk) with the 54th (Alakurtti), 111th (Sortavala) and 131st Motor Rifle Divisions, plus three zero-strength mobilisation divisions at Petrozavodsk, Alakurtti, and Nagornyy; the 26th Army Corps at Arkhangelsk, formed in 1967, with the 69th (Vologda) and 77th Guards Motor Rifle Divisions (Arkhangelsk), the 258th Separate Helicopter Squadron at Luostari/Pechenga airfield near Luostari, and other smaller units; the 30th Guards Leningrad Red Banner Army Corps at Vyborg, with the 45th Guards Motor Rifle Division, the 64th Guards Motor Rifle Division, and the 37th Motor Rifle Division (a mobilisation division, the double of the 63 MRTD) at Chernaya Rechka; and the 63rd Guards Training Motor Rifle Division, and the 76th Guards Airborne Division, under district control. At Garbolovo ([60 20 14N, 30 29 55E]) there was the 36th Air Assault Brigade (effectively an airmobile brigade), which had been activated in autumn 1979.

By 1990 the district included 60,000 servicemen, 822 tanks, 2,000 armored fighting vehicles, 1,100 guns, mortars and MLRS systems, and 100 helicopters.

==== Forces in 1990 ====
The composition of the troops of the district was as follows:

Formations and units of district subordination

- District Headquarters – Leningrad
- 2nd Guards Artillery Perekop Red Banner, Order of the Suvorov Division (HQ Pushkin)
- 229th Rear Guard Division (DOT) (Garbolovo)
- 250th Reserve Motor Rifle Division (Vladimirsky Lager)
- 359th separate security and support battalion
- 2nd Guards Spetsnaz Brigade (Promezhitsy, Pskov Region)
- 1071st Training Regiment of Special Designation (Pechory, Pskov Oblast) (Military Unit Number 51064)
- 36th Separate Air Assault Brigade (Garbolovo)
- 21st Rocket Brigade (Oselki, Leningrad Oblast)
- 131st Rocket Brigade (Luga, Leningrad Oblast)
- 186th Training Rocket Brigade (Luga, Leningrad Oblast)
- 195th Training Rocket Brigade (Medved, Novgorod Oblast (Arakcheevsky barracks)
- 141st Anti-Aircraft Rocket Brigade (Nenimyaki, Leningrad Oblast)
- 289th High Power Artillery Brigade (Meadows)
- 451st separate anti-tank artillery battalion
- 332nd Separate Guards Transport and Combat Helicopter Regiment (Pribilovo)
- 317th separate mixed aviation squadron (Taibola)
- 33rd Engineer Regiment (Kotly)
- 170th Engineer Regiment
- 7th Guards Pontoon-Bridge Kingisepp Red Banner Order of Alexander Nevsky Regiment (Kerro)
- 639th separate engineering road and bridge battalion
- 95th Leningrad Red Banner Communications Brigade named after the 50th anniversary of the formation of the USSR (Chernaya Rechka)
- 97th Communications Brigade (Agalatovo, Vsevolozhsk District)
- 192nd separate communications regiment
- 1611th training separate communications battalion
- 73rd Radio Engineering Brigade (Toksovo)
- 146th Separate Radio Engineering Red Banner Special Purpose Brigade (Bugry, Vsevolozhsky District)
- 164th Separate Electronic Warfare Regiment
- 41st Chemical Protection Brigade (Vologda)
- 69th Logistics Brigade
- 71st Logistics Brigade
- 3rd Automobile Brigade
- 34th Pipeline Brigade
- 209th Medical Brigade
- Repair enterprises of district subordination
  - 75th Automobile Repair Plant (Petrozavodsk)
  - 775th Artillery Repair Plant
  - 521st Communications Repair Plant
- Bases and warehouses of district subordination
  - 10th air base (helicopters)
  - 970th central base of reserve vehicles
  - 1873th Automobile Base
  - 2124th NRB
  - 3807th military equipment storage base (Chernaya Rechka) (The disbanded 37th (146th?) Motor Rifle Division)
  - 5188th military equipment storage base (Ivanteevo)
- training centers and spare parts
  - 56th Guards District Training Krasnoselsky Order of Lenin, Red Banner, Order of Suvorov and Bogdan Khmelnitsky Junior Specialist Training Center (motorized rifle troops) (Sertolovo)
  - 323rd, 391st, 406th, 731st, 987th training centers
  - 321st School of Ensigns (Garbolovo)
- 1494th Reserve Rocket and Artillery Regiment

==== 30th Guards Army Corps ====
- Office of the commander, headquarters and a separate company of protection and support (the city of Vyborg);
- 93rd Separate Helicopter Squadron (Kasimovo Airfield);
- Units directly under corps command
- 45th Guards Motor Rifle Krasnoselskaya Order of Lenin, Red Banner Division (Kamenka);
- 64th Guards Motor Rifle Krasnoselskaya Order of Lenin, Red Banner Division

==== 26th Army Corps ====
In December 1989, the 77th Guards Motor Rifle Division Moscow-Chernigov was transformed into a coastal defense division of the same name, and the 69th Sevsk Motor Rifle Division in Vologda was transformed into the 5189th Base for Storage of Weapons and Equipment (Russian acronym VKhVT). Accordingly, in 1991, the 26th ("Arkhangelsk") Army Corps had more than a modest set of corps units and the 5189th BKhVT in Vologda. The 77th Guards Coastal Defence Division was then reorganised as a separate coastal defence brigade by 1 December 1994.

- Corps Headquarters – Arkhangelsk
- 258th Separate Helicopter Squadron (Luostari)
- Collapsed divisions:
- 14th Engineer Regiment
- 293rd Engineer Regiment
- 1068th separate communications battalion (Arkhangelsk)
- 55th Logistics Brigade
- 709th separate repair and restoration battalion
- 5189th military equipment storage base (Vologda)

In 1989 V.I. Feskov et al. reported that the 71st MRD became the 5186th VKhVT, the 115th Guards became a storage base, and the Motor Rifle Division at Chernaya Rechka (the 37th, it was apparent later) was reduced to become the 3807th Base for Storage of Weapons and Equipment.

The 36th Landing-Assault Brigade was under district control until June 1990, when it was transferred to the Soviet Airborne Troops. Becoming part of the Russian Airborne Troops as the country dissolved, it was active until February 1997.

In 1990 the 63rd Guards became the 56th Guards District Training Centre.

In 1993 the 5189th Base for Storage of Weapons and Equipment was disbanded.

=== Post-Cold War ===
The fall of the Soviet Union caused much reassessment of the Russian Federation's military situation. During most of the 1990s, economic constraints greatly hampered military effectiveness. Several formations, such as the 25th Guards Motor Rifle Brigade, formed on 1 January 1993 from the disbanding 24th Tank Training Division at Riga, arrived in the district having been withdrawn from the former Baltic Military District. Since 1992 many formations and units of the District have participated in local conflicts and peace-keeping missions, especially in the North Caucasus.

The 111th Motor Rifle Division (still part of 6th Army) was active until 1994, and then seemingly became the 20th Separate MR Bde, which became a VKhVT between January 1997 and June 1998. As the 20th Separate Motor Rifle Brigade it shifted formations into the 30th Guards Army Corps. Also in 1994 the 5186th VkHVT at Petrozavodsk was seemingly upgraded into the 30th Separate Motor Rifle Brigade.

In early December 1997, President Boris Yeltsin said in Sweden that Russia would make unilateral reductions to forces in the northwest, which included the Leningrad Military District. He promised that land and naval units would be reduced by 40 per cent by January 1999. In May 1999, when Russian defense minister Marshal Igor Sergeyev confirmed that the cuts had taken place, Sergeyev said that the personnel of the Leningrad Military District had been drawn down by 52 per cent. In terms of formations, the series of disbandments left the district almost unrecognisable. The 6th Army's staff at Petrozavodsk, the staff of the 30th Guards Army Corps at Vyborg, and all the motor rifle divisions previously in the district disbanded (including the 54th Guards MRD, reduced in size to a brigade and then which became a storage base, and the 64th Guards, reduced to a storage base). Left in their place were a number of weapons and equipment storage sites, and two motor rifle brigades (between January 1997 and June 1998 the 45th Guards MRD was reduced in size to become the 138th Guards Motor Rifle Brigade, and the 131st was reduced in size to become the 200th Separate Motor Rifle Brigade).

In terms of air forces, after the collapse of the Soviet Union the 76th Army of the Soviet Air Forces and the 6th Air Army of the Soviet Air Defence Forces, were left operating in the district. The two forces were merged as the 6th Army of VVS and PVO in 1998.

Leningrad Military District Map

The 138th Guards Motor Rifle Brigade at Kamenka was deployed for operations during the Second Chechen War, in which, along with other Russian Ground Forces units, its personnel was reported to have behaved badly at times. A 22-year-old woman in Ingushetia was shot by drunken soldiers from the brigade scavenging for alcohol. The deployment of a tank battalion of the brigade was apparently halted when it was discovered that soldiers had been selling the explosive from their tanks' reactive armour.

The second fully operational brigade in the district, the 200th Motor Rifle Brigade descends from the World War II-era 45th Rifle Division, which later became the 131st Motor Rifle Division.

In 2006–07, the 35th Base for Storage of Weapons & Equipment, the former 54th Motor Rifle Division at Alakurtti, was disbanded.

The Russian Airborne Troops' 76th Air Assault Division was also based within the district's boundaries, at Pskov.

Presidential Decree 900 dated July 27, 1998 gave the District's composition as the Republic of Karelia, the Komi Republic, Arkhangelsk, Vologda, Leningrad, Murmansk, Novgorod, and Pskov oblasts, Saint Petersburg, and the Nenets Autonomous Okrug. The district headquarters is now in the General Staff Building on Palace Square in Saint Petersburg.

General Lieutenant Nikolai Bogdanovsky, commanded the district, between March 2009 and September 2010. On the abolition of the district General Bogdansky became Deputy Commander of the Russian Ground Forces.

=== Subordinate units in 2010 ===
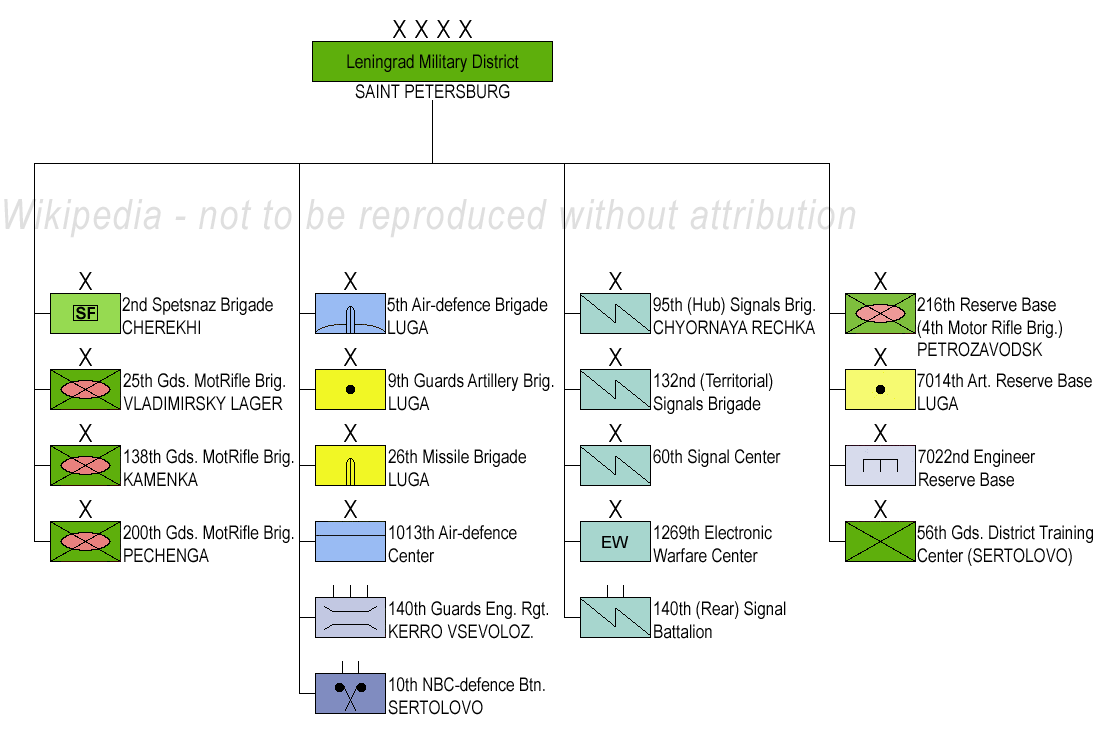
Structure and units of the Leningrad Military District in 2010

Order of Lenin Leningrad Military District in 2010:

- Combat formations:
  - 25th Separate Guards Motor-Rifle Brigade "Sevastopol – Latvian Rifles", in Vladimirsky Lager equipped with MT-LBV
  - 138th Guards Motor Rifle Brigade "Krasnoselskaya", in Kamenka equipped with MT-LBV (former 45th Guards MRD)
  - 200th Separate Motor Rifle Brigade "Pechenga", in Pechenga equipped with MT-LBV
  - 216th Reserve Base (4th Separate Motor-Rifle Brigade), in Petrozavodsk
  - 2nd Separate Spetsnaz Brigade, in Cherekhi
  - 56th Guards District Training Center "Krasnoselskyy"
- Missile and Artillery formations:
  - 26th Rocket Brigade "Nemanskaya", in Luga
  - 9th Guards Artillery Brigade "Kelecko-Berlin", in Luga
  - 7014th Artillery Reserve Base, in Luga
- Air-defence formations:
  - 5th Anti-Aircraft Rocket Brigade equipped with the Buk missile system
  - 1013th Air-defence Center
- Engineering formations:
  - 140th Guards Engineer Regiment "Kingisepskyy", in Kerro Vsevolozhskyy
  - 7022nd Engineer Reserve Base
- NBC-defence formations:
  - 10th Separate NBC-defence Battalion, in Sertolovo
- Signal formations:
  - 95th (Communications Hub) Signal Brigade "50th years of USSR"
  - 132nd (Territorial) Signal Brigade "Konstancskaya"
  - 60th Signal Center
  - 1269th Separate Electronic Warfare Center
  - 140th Separate (Rear) Signal Battalion

=== Recreation in 2024 ===
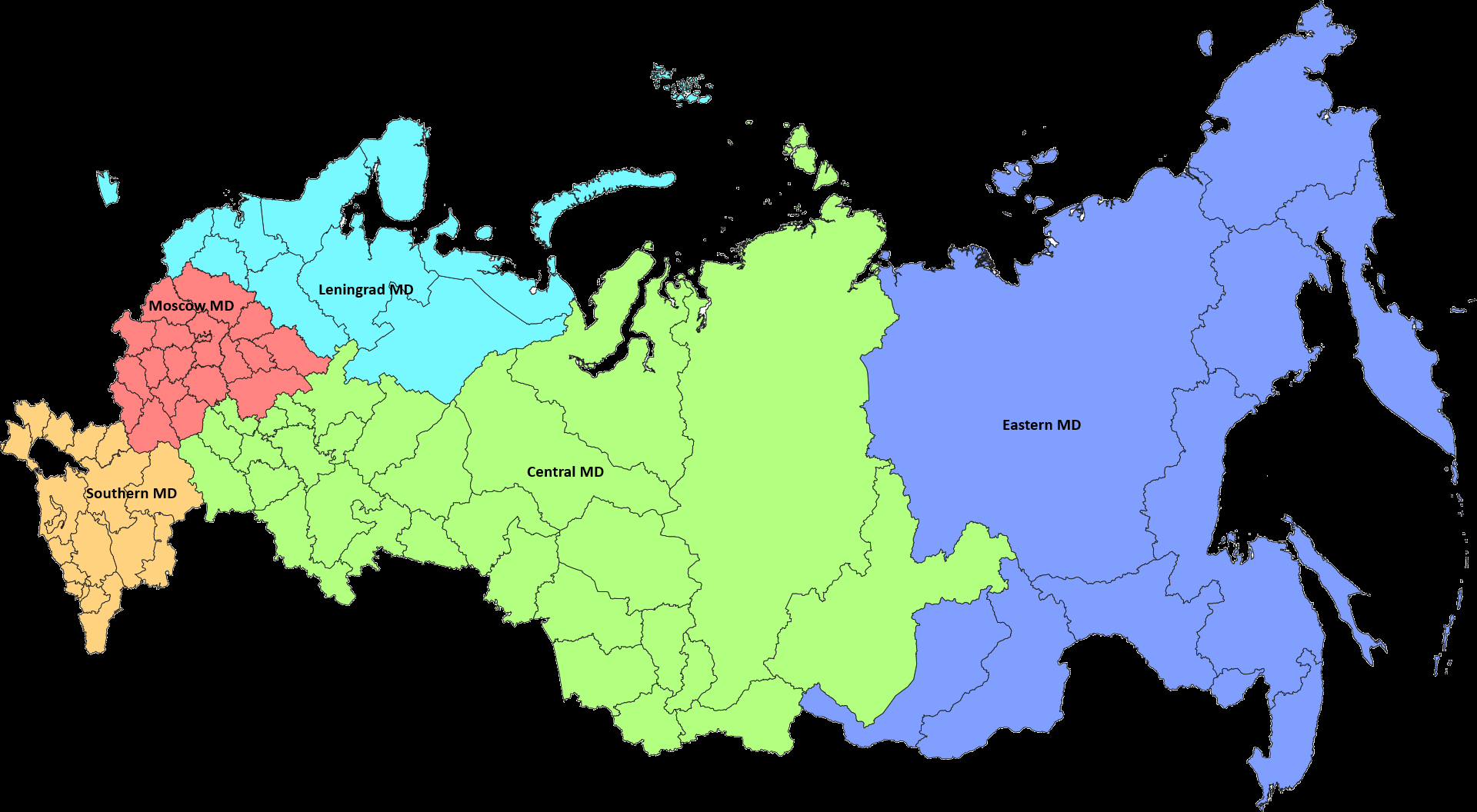
Military districts of the Russian Federation as of 2024, Leningrad MD in blue color.

In 2024, after the Russian invasion of Ukraine the district was reestablished. Since the middle of January 2024, the Northern Fleet lost its status as a military-administrative unit in line with a military district, and the territory it administered became part of the Leningrad Military District once more.

In March 2024, Shoigu announced that another new district's army corps (44th Army Corps, which is already in action in Kharkiv Oblast), would be formed through the year. The reforms also include reinforcement of the 11th Army Corps and 14th Army Corps into armies. All of the new or reinforced formations will be based within the Leningrad Military District.

On 2 September 2024, it was announced that the district's deputy commander, Valery Mumindzhanov, a Shoigu loyalist, was arrested on corruption charges as part of an apparent purge by Andrey Belousov.

== Component units ==
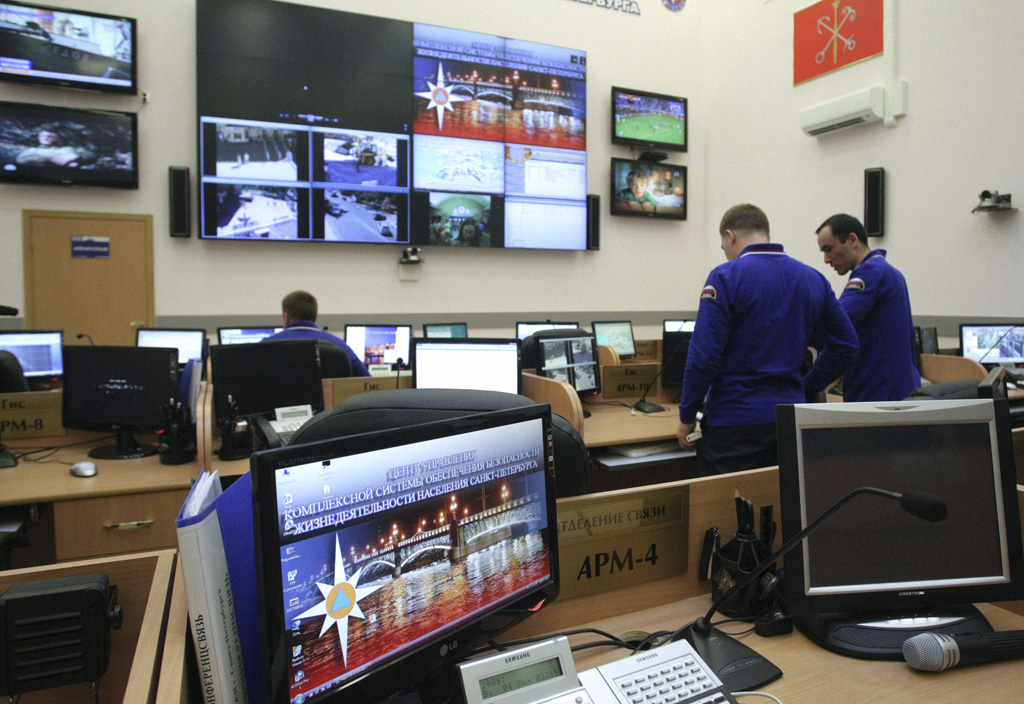
Russia's Comprehensive Security System Center in Saint Petersburg.

=== Direct reporting units and formations ===
- 1st Command Brigade (Sertolovo, Leningrad Oblast) (ru:1-я бригада управления)
- 51st Separate Logistics Brigade (Krasnoye Selo)
- 132nd Signals Brigade (Agalatovo)
- 1060th Centre for Material-Technical Support (Pushkin, Saint Petersburg)

=== Ground forces ===
6th Combined Arms Army (Agalatovo)

- 68th Guards Motor Rifle Division "Latvian Riflemen" (Vladimirsky Lager)
- 69th Guards Motor Rifle Division (Kamenka)
- 9th Guards Artillery Brigade (Luga)
- 268th Guards Artillery Brigade (Pushkin)
- 5th Anti-Aircraft Rocket Brigade (Gorelovo)
- 26th Rocket Brigade (Luga)
- 95th Administration and Command Brigade (Gorelovo)
- 1009th Motor Rifle Regiment
- 30th Engineering Regiment (Vsevolozhsk)

44th Army Corps (Petrozavodsk)

- 72nd Motor Rifle Division
  - 22nd Motor Rifle Regiment
  - 30th Motor Rifle Regiment
  - 41st Motor Rifle Regiment
  - 10th Engineer Regiment
- 128th Separate Motor Rifle Brigade

11th Army Corps (Kaliningrad)

As of 2024 ground combat units deployed within the 11th Corps include:

- 18th Guards Motor Rifle Division (formed in December 2020 incorporating existing (and potentially new) regiments.)
  - 75th Motor Rifle Regiment (reported forming as of 2021 in Sovetsk)
  - 79th Guards Motor Rifle Regiment (former 79th Separate Guards Motor Rifle Brigade re-formed as a regiment – Gusev, Kaliningrad Oblast)
  - 275th Motor Rifle Regiment
  - 280th Motor Rifle Regiment
  - 11th Separate Tank Regiment (Gusev, Kaliningrad Oblast) (Military Unit Number V/Ch (в/ч) 41611) (Equipped with T-72B Main Battle Tanks (upgrades of T-72s to B3M standard underway as of 2019/20)
  - 22nd Guards Air Defence Missile Regiment (Tor M1/M2), in Kaliningrad
  - 20th Separate Reconnaissance Battalion (forming 2020–21; Orlan-10 UAVs and "Sobolyatnik" and "Fara-VR" reconnaissance radars)
- 7th Separate Guards Motor Rifle Regiment (Kaliningrad) (equipped with BMP-3 infantry fighting vehicles as of 2021; regiment reportedly retains independent status outside 18th Motor Rifle Division)
- 244th Artillery Brigade (2A36/BM-21/2S7M Malka self-propelled howitzers with Zoopark-1 counter-battery radars), BM-27 Uragan multiple rocket launchers (delivery initiated 2020) and 9P157-2 Khrizantema-S tank destroyers) in Kaliningrad
- 152nd Guards Missile Brigade (9K720 Iskander-M), at Chernyakhovsk Air Base
- 73rd Bridge Battalion

14th Army Corps (Murmansk)

- 71st Guards Motor Rifle Division (Pechenga)
- 80th Arctic Motor Rifle Brigade (Alakurtti)
- 58th Control Battalion (Murmansk)
- 382nd Rocket Artillery Battalion
- 104th Artillery Brigade

==== Intelligence/Spetsnaz units and formations ====
- 2nd Guards Spetsnaz Brigade (Promezhitsy)
- 146th Separate Radio Technical Special Purpose Brigade (Bugry)
- 322nd Special Forces Training Center

=== Naval Forces ===
- Northern Fleet
- Baltic Fleet

==== Naval Infantry and Coast Defense ====
- 336th Guards Naval Infantry Brigade (village Mechnikovo, Baltiysk) (Naval Infantry) (Baltic Fleet)
- 25th Coastal Rocket Brigade with (BAL-E/K-300P Bastion-P), at Donskoye Air Base
- 61st Naval Infantry Brigade (Sputnik, Murmansk Oblast) (Northern Fleet)
- 536th Coastal Missile Brigade
- 63rd Separate Marine Engineering Regiment
- 742th Fleet Signals Unit
- 302nd Fleet Radio-Electronic Regiment
- 420th Maritime Reconnaissance Point

=== Aerospace Forces ===
- 6th Air and Air Defence Forces Army (Saint Petersburg)
  - 105th Guards Composite Aviation Division
    - 159th Fighter Aviation Regiment (Petrozavodsk) (Two Squadrons: Sukhoi Su-35S)
    - 790th Fighter Aviation Regiment (Khotilovo) (Two Squadrons: Mikoyan MiG-31; One Squadron: Su-35)
    - 14th Guards Fighter Aviation Regiment (Kursk) (Two Squadrons: Sukhoi Su-30SM)
    - 47th Composite Guards Aviation Regiment (Voronezh) (Two Squadrons: Sukhoi Su-34)
    - 4th Reconnaissance Aviation Squadron (Shatalovo) (Sukhoi Su-24MR)
  - Naval Aviation (drawn from 132nd Mixed Aviation Division – Kaliningrad)
    - 689th Guards Fighter Aviation Regiment (Two Squadrons: Sukhoi Su-27P – planned to re-equip with the Su-35
    - 4th Naval Attack Aviation Regiment (One Squadron: Sukhoi Su-30SM; One Squadron: Su-24M)
  - 2nd Air Defence Division (St. Petersburg region)
    - 1488th Anti-Aircraft Missile Regiment (Zelenogorsk – S-400 SAM system)
    - 1489th Anti-Aircraft Missile Regiment (Vaganovo – S-400/Pantsir SAM systems)
    - 1490th Anti-Aircraft Missile Regiment (Ulyanovka – S-400 SAMs)
    - 500th Anti-Aircraft Missile Regiment (Gostilitsy – S-400/Pantsir SAMs)
    - 1544th Anti-Aircraft Missile Regiment (Vladimirsky Lager – S-400 SAMs)
  - 32nd Air Defence Division
    - 42nd Anti-Aircraft Missile Regiment (Izhitsy – S-300PM2 surface-to-air missile system)
    - 108th Anti-Aircraft Missile Regiment (Voronezh – S-300PM2 SAMs)
  - 44th Air Defence Division of the Baltic Fleet (Kaliningrad region)
    - 183rd Anti-Aircraft Missile Regiment (Gvardeysk – S-400/S-300/Pantsir SAMs)
    - 1545th Anti-Aircraft Missile Regiment (Kruglovo – S-400 SAMs)
- 45th Air Forces and Air Defence Army (Northern Fleet Air Force) (Severomorsk)

== Commanders ==
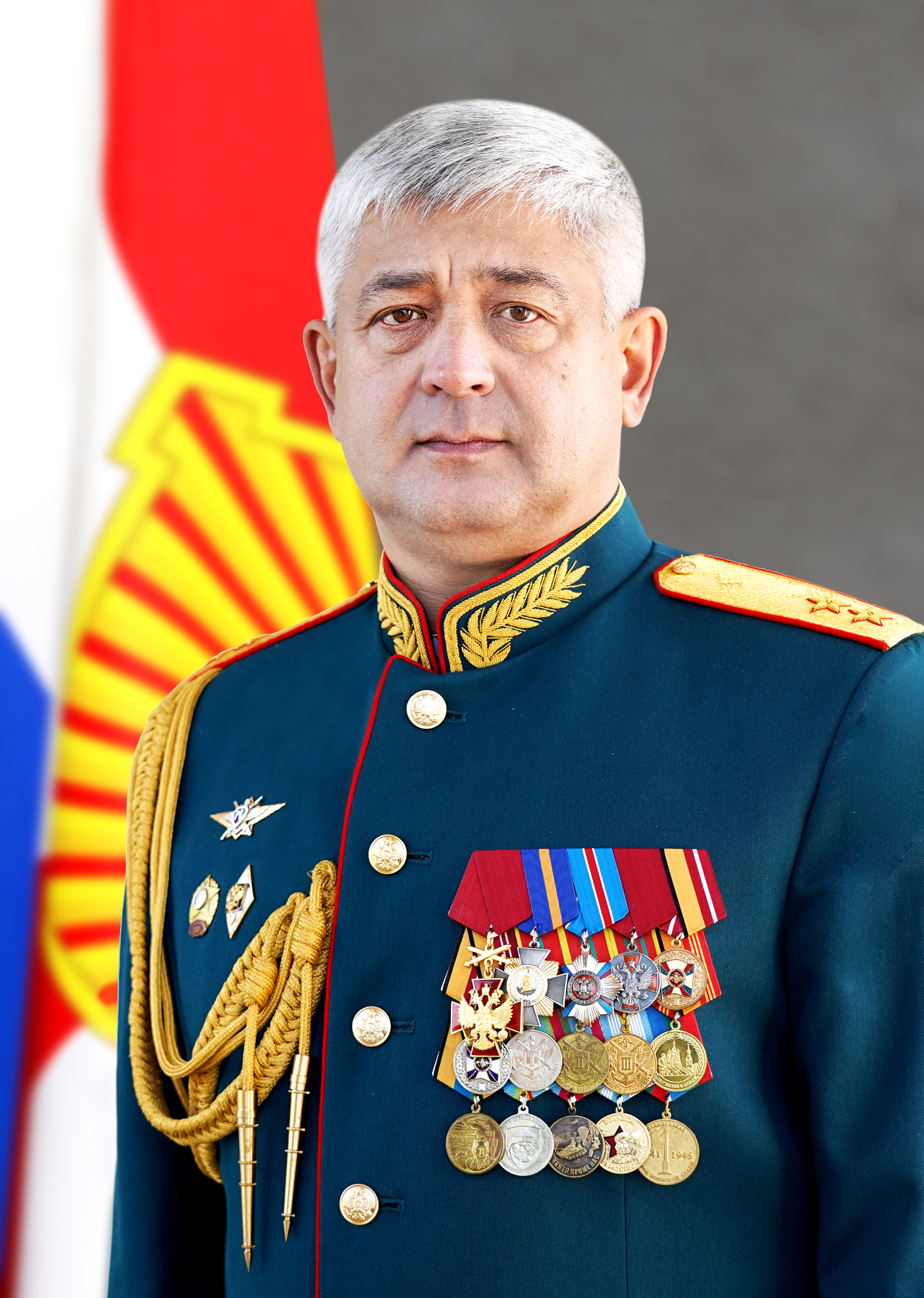
Colonel General Yevgeny Nikiforov

During its existence, the district was commanded by the following officers:

- Boris Pozern (1918–1919)
- Dmitry Nikolayevich Avrov 1920–1921
- Alexander Yegorov 1921
- Vladimir Gittis 1921–1925
- Boris Shaposhnikov 1925–1927
- August Kork 1927–1928
- Mikhail Tukhachevsky 1928–1931
- Ivan Panfilovich Belov 1931–1935
- Komandarm 1st rank Boris Shaposhnikov (September 1935 – June 1937)
- Komandarm 2nd rank Pavel Dybenko (June–10 September 1937)
- Mikhail Khozin 1937–1939
- Komandarm 2nd rank Kirill Meretskov (January 1939 – January 1940)
- Komandarm 1st rank (promoted to Marshal of the Soviet Union May 1940) Semyon Timoshenko (January–June 1940)
- Lieutenant General Mikhail Kirponos (June 1940 – January 1941)
- Lieutenant General Markian Popov (January–June 1941)
- Lieutenant General Trifon Shevaldin (July–September 1941)
- Marshal of the Soviet Union Leonid Govorov (July 1945 – April 1946)
- Lieutenant General Dmitry Gusev (April 1946 – September 1949)
- Lieutenant General Alexander Luchinsky (September 1949 – May 1953)
- General of the Army Matvei Zakharov (May 1953 – October 1957)
- General of the Army Nikolay Krylov (January 1958 – October 1960)
- General of the Army Mikhail Kazakov (October 1960 – October 1965)
- Lieutenant General Sergei Sokolov (October 1965 – April 1967)
- Lieutenant General Ivan Shavrov (May 1967 – January 1973)
- Lieutenant General Anatoly Gribkov (February 1973 – September 1976)
- Colonel General Mikhail Sorokin (October 1976 – October 1981)
- General of the Army Boris Snetkov (November 1981 – December 1987)
- Colonel General Viktor Yermakov (December 1987 – July 1990)
- Colonel General Viktor Samsonov (July 1990 – December 1991)
- Lieutenant General Sergey Seleznyov (7 December 1991 – 17 December 1996; appointed by USSR President Gorbachev as of 7 Dec 1991)
- Lieutenant General (promoted to Colonel General May 1997 and General of the Army February 2003) Valentin Bobryshev (December 1996–9 March 2005)
- General of the Army Igor Puzanov (9 March 2005 – 11 December 2007)
- Colonel General Valery Gerasimov (11 December 2007 – 5 February 2009)
- Lieutenant General Nikolai Bogdanovsky (23 March 2009 – September 2010)
- Colonel General Aleksandr Lapin (16 May 2024 – 21 September 2025)
- Colonel General Yevgeny Nikiforov (21 September 2025–)
