= Bugry, Russia =

Bugry (Russian: Бугры) is the name of several inhabited localities in Russia.

== Altai Krai ==
As of 2010, one rural locality in Altai Krai bear this name:

- Bugry, Altai Krai, a settlement in Rubtsovsky District.

== Bryansk Oblast ==
As of 2010, two rural localities in Bryansk Oblast bear this name:

- Bugry, Karachevsky District, Bryansk Oblast, a village in Karachevsky District;
- Bugry, Komarichsky District, Bryansk Oblast, a settlement in Komarichsky District.

== Kostroma Oblast ==
As of 2010, one rural locality in Kostroma Oblast bears this name:

- Bugry, Kostroma Oblast, a village in Kostromskoy District.

== Kursk Oblast ==
As of 2010, two rural localities in Kursk Oblast bear this name:

- Bugry, Fatezhsky District, Kursk Oblast, a village in Fatezhsky District;
- Bugry, Zolotukhinsky District, Kursk Oblast, a khutor in Zolotukhinsky District.

== Leningrad Oblast ==
As of 2010, two rural localities in Leningrad Oblast bear this name:

- Bugry, Gatchinsky District, Leningrad Oblast, a village in Gatchinsky District;
- Bugry, Vsevolozhsky District, Leningrad Oblast, a settlement in Vsevolozhsky District.

== Republic of Mordovia ==
As of 2010, one rural locality in the Republic of Mordovia bear this name:

- Bugry, Republic of Mordovia, a village in Ichalkovsky District.

== Nizhny Novgorod Oblast ==
As of 2010, one rural locality in Nizhny Novgorod Oblast bears this name:

- Bugry, Nizhny Novgorod Oblast, a village in Dalnekonstantinovsky District.

== Novgorod Oblast ==
As of 2010, two rural localities in Novgorod Oblast bears this name:

- Bugry (settlement), Novgorod Oblast, a settlement in Khvoyninsky District;
- Bugry (village), Novgorod Oblast, a village in Khvoyninsky District.

== Oryol Oblast ==
As of 2010, one rural locality in Oryol Oblast bears this name:

- Bugry, Oryol Oblast, a village in Mtsensky District.

== Penza Oblast ==
As of 2010, one rural locality in Penza Oblast bears this name:

- Bugry, Penza Oblast, a village Tamalinsky District.

== Perm Krai ==
As of 2010, one rural locality in Perm Krai bears this name:

- Bugry, Perm Krai, a village in Chastinsky District.

== Pskov Oblast ==
As of 2010, two rural localities in Pskov Oblast bears this name:

- Bugry, Velikoluksky District, Pskov Oblast, a village in Velikoluksky District;
- Bugry, Nevelsky District, Pskov Oblast, a village in Nevelsky District.

== Rostov Oblast ==
As of 2010, one inhabited locality in Rostov Oblast bear this name:

- Bugry, Rostov Oblast, a khutor in Semikarakorsky District.

== Samara Oblast ==
As of 2010, one inhabited locality in Samara Oblast bear this name:

- Bugry, Samara Oblast, a settlement in Kinelsky District.

== Sverdlovsk Oblast ==
As of 2010, one inhabited locality in Sverdlovsk Oblast bear this name:

- Bugry, Sverdlovsk Oblast, a village.

== Tomsk Oblast ==
As of 2010, one inhabited locality in Tomsk Oblast bear this name:

- Bugry, Tomsk Oblast, a village in Parabelsky District.

== Tyumen Oblast ==
As of 2010, one inhabited locality in Tyumen Oblast bear this name:

- Bugry, Tyumen Oblast, a village in Nizhnetavdinsky District.

== Vologda Oblast ==
As of 2010, two rural localities in Vologda Oblast bear this name:

- Bugry, Ustyuzhensky District, Vologda Oblast, a village in Ustyuzhensky District;
- Bugry, Sheksninsky District, Vologda Oblast, a village in Sheksninsky District.
