= 5th Anti-Aircraft Brigade =

5th Anti-Aircraft Brigade may refer to:

- 5th Anti-Aircraft Missile Brigade – a Soviet and later Russian Army formation, 1971-present
- 5th Anti-Aircraft Brigade (United Kingdom) – A British Anti-Aircraft Command formation 1940–1950s
