= 131st Brigade =

131st Brigade may refer to:

- 131st Infantry Brigade (United Kingdom)
- 131st Rocket Brigade, Russia/Soviet Union
- 131st Separate Motor Rifle Brigade, Russia/Soviet Union

== See also ==
- 131st Division (disambiguation)
- 131st Regiment (disambiguation)
