= 346th Brigade =

346th Brigade may refer to:

- 346th Rocket Brigade, Russia/Soviet Union
- 346th Brigade, Royal Field Artillery, United Kingdom
