= 68th Guards Motor Rifle Division =

Russian Ground Forces formation

68th Guards Motor Rifle Sevastopol Red Banner Division named after the Latvian Riflemen (2025–present) 25th Separate Guards Motor Rifle Sevastopol Red Banner Brigade named after the Latvian Riflemen (1992–2025)
- 68-я гвардейская мотострелковая Севастопольская Краснознамённая дивизия имени Латышских стрелков
- Active: 1992–present
- Country: Russia
- Branch: Russian Ground Forces
- Type: Motorized Infantry
- Size: Division
- Part of: Leningrad Military District; 6th Combined Arms Army
- Garrison/HQ: Luga, Leningrad Oblast
- Nickname: Latvian Riflemen
- Engagements: World War II; Crimean offensive; Russian invasion of Ukraine; Battle of Kharkiv; 2024 Kharkiv offensive; Kupiansk offensive
- Decorations: Guards; Order of the Red Banner
- Battle honours: Sevastopol

Commanders
- Current commander: Colonel Andrei Arkhipov

The 68th Guards Motor Rifle Sevastopol Red Banner Division named after the Latvian Riflemen (Russian: 25-я гвардейская мотострелковая Севастопольская Краснознамённая дивизия имени Латышских стрелков; MUN 29760) is a unit of the Russian Ground Forces, which traces its history to the 13th Guards Rifle Regiment (ru:13-й гвардейский стрелковый полк).

== History ==
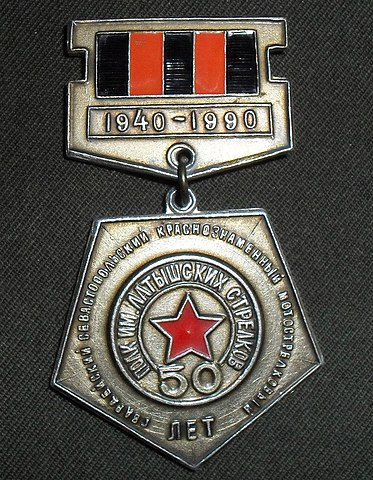
Medal commemorating "50 years of the Guards Sevastopol Red Banner Motor Rifle Regiment named for the Latvian Riflemen," 1990.

The predecessor of the formation was established on August 18, 1940, as the 666th Rifle Regiment of the 153rd Rifle Division. From September–November 1941 the division was "ranged among the Guards" by being raised to the status of the 3rd Guards Rifle Division. The unit was reorganized on September 18, 1941, in the 13th Guards Rifle Regiment. Then-Lieutenant Colonel Vasily Margelov took over command of the regiment in June 1942. Margelov was to take a leading role in the development of the Soviet Airborne Forces decades after the end of the war.

In February 1944, the division and the 2nd Guards Army was transferred to the area of the Perekop Isthmus and in April–May took part in the Crimean strategic operation. On April 8, the guardsmen of the regiment attacked the Perekop positions. In forty minutes, the regiment overcame four trenches, an anti-tank ditch, five rows of barbed wire and minefields. The enemy did not give up a single high-rise building, not a single line without a fight. To pursue the enemy on April 12, a divisional advanced mobile detachment under the command of Captain V. Stebunov [2], who later became the regiment commander, set out. The detachment swiftly pursued the enemy, cutting off his escape routes, and defeated eight rearguard barriers. During the operation on April 13, 1944, Evpatoria was liberated and, in cooperation with other troops of the 4th Ukrainian Front and the Black Sea Fleet, Sevastopol was liberated on May 9. At some later point the regiment was given the title "Sevastopol" for its role in seizing the city.

At the end of the fighting on the fronts of the Great Patriotic War on May 9, 1945, the regiment was deployed to Amalienau in the province Königsberg, East Prussia, being part of the 3rd Guards Rifle Red Banner Order of the Suvorov division. From April 4, 1952, to May 1956, the regiment was deployed in Lithuanian SSR as part 3rd Guards Rifle Krasnoznamny, Order of Suvorov Division.

The 13th Guards Rifle Regiment continued serving with the 3rd Guards Rifle Division after the end of the war. Almost all such formations were reorganized into the new "Motor Rifle" organisation in June 1957, and thus the now-13th Guards Motor Rifle Regiment formed part of the new 3rd Guards Motor Rifle Division as it had the old. The division was stationed at Klaipėda in the Lithuanian SSR, Baltic Military District.

From May 1956 the 13th Guards Motor Rifle Regiment was stationed in Adazi (Adazi-2, now Kadaga) near the capital of Latvian SSR, Riga. The regiment trained and prepared junior officers and specialists: BMP commander, gunner guns of drivers of various military vehicles, radio chiefs, commanders of the engineering units.

In March 1963 the 13th Guards Motor Rifle Regiment was transferred to the 24th Tank Training Division. The 24th Tank Training Division on 14 September 1987 became the 54th District Training Centre.

In accordance with the Directive of the First Deputy Chief of the Joint Armed Forces of the Commonwealth of Independent States on 11 March 1992 No. 314/3/0327, and the Directive of the Commander of the North Western Group of Forces on 29 August 1992 No. 6/1/0287, 13th Guards Red Banner Sevastopol Training Motor Rifle Regiment was reorganised as the 25th Guards Motor Rifle Brigade, seemingly in September 1992.

In accordance with a directive of the Defence Minister of the Russian Federation on 11 October 1993 No. 314/1/001200, Directive General Staff of the Armed Forces of the Russian Federation on 11 November 1993 No. 453/4/01002-25 25th Guards Motor Rifle Sevastopol Red Banner separate brigade named after the Latvian Riflemen was relocated from Latvia to Strugi Krasnye (Vladimirsky Lager), Pskov Oblast, Russia, becoming part of the troops of the Leningrad Military District. On November 11, 1993, the brigade was reorganized into the 42nd Storage Base of Military Equipment (BHVT) in the village Strugi Krasnye of the Pskov Oblast. Meanwhile, still back in Latvia the 54th District Training Centre was disbanded in 1995.

Warfare.ru reported that the brigade, based at Vladimirsky Lager, was a redesignation of the 42nd Base for Storage of Weapons and Equipment. In 2000 it had 443 personnel, 31 T-80; 24 Uragan, 236 MT-LBT. In 2009: BM-21 Grad – 18, 152mm 2S3M Akatsia – 36, 2B14 Podnos– 18, 100 mm MT-12 Rapira – 6, 9P149 Shturm-S – 18, 9A33BM2(3) Osa – 12, 9A34(35) Strela-10 – 6, 2S6M Tunguska – 6. 41(82) T-80, 120 MT-LB. 4393?(2200?) personnel. The brigade was involved in several mobilisation exercises over the years.

=== Russian invasion of Ukraine (2022–present) ===
The brigade participated in the initial phase of the Russian invasion of Ukraine. However, due to losses in Kharkiv Oblast during the eastern Ukraine offensive, units of the brigade left the combat zone on 8 March 2022, and returned to Nekhoteyevka, Belgorod Oblast to refit.

In the winter of 2023 and 2024, the brigade fought positional battles in the Sinkivka area of the Kharkiv Oblast. In May–June 2024, the brigade took part in the battles for Vovchansk.

On January 28, 2025, the brigade was congratulated by the Russian Minister of Defence Andrey Belousov for capturing the village of Dvorichna.

In January 2025, the brigade was reformed into the 68th Motor Rifle Division.

In May 2025, the Russian ministry of defense claimed that the division's 121st Motor Rifle Regiment was responsible for the capture of Kindrashivka in the Kharkiv region. Russian sources claimed that the 121st Regiment was responsible for the capture of Holubivka in July. Elements of the division also reportedly took part in the August recapture of Kindrashivka and were trying to seize Kindrashivka in September.

In June 2025, the division's 52nd Reconnaissance Battalion was operating near the villages of Zapadne and Lyman Pershyi, according to Ukrainian intelligence.

The 68th Division reportedly continued operating on the Kupiansk front into October 2025.

In June 2025, the Ukrainian military intelligence published an intercepted audio recording of an alleged Russian commander telling a subordinate that a soldier referred to by his call sign "Brelok" killed and then proceeded to eat his fellow service member, referred to by call sign "Foma" over a period of two weeks. According to Ukrainian intelligence, the speaker in the recording was a commander of a reconnaissance unit in the 68th Guards Motor Rifle Division.

== Organization ==
Structure (since 2017)

- Brigade HQ;
- 1st motorized rifle battalion;
- 2nd motorized rifle battalion;
- 3rd motorized rifle battalion;
- tank battalion;
- 1st howitzer self-propelled artillery battalion;
- 2nd howitzer self-propelled artillery battalion;
- rocket artillery battalion;
- anti-tank artillery battalion;
- anti-aircraft missile battalion;
- anti-aircraft missile and artillery battalion;
- reconnaissance battalion;
- engineer battalion;
- command (communications) battalion;
- repair and recovery battalion;
- logistics battalion;
- rifle company (snipers);
- NBC3 company;
- UAV company;
- EW company;
- commandant company;
- medical company;
- command platoon of the chief of artillery (VUNA);
- command and radar reconnaissance platoon (air defense chief);
- command platoon (reconnaissance department chief);
- instructor platoon;
- simulator platoon;
- orchestra.

== Heroes of Russia ==
- Guards Senior Lieutenant Magomedov, Shamil Nabibullagovich (posthumously) — commander of a motorized rifle platoon.
- Guards Captain Rozhkov Bogdan Igorevich (posthumously) — commander of the assault detachment.
