= Valery Mumindzhanov =

Russian major general

- Валерий Муминджанов
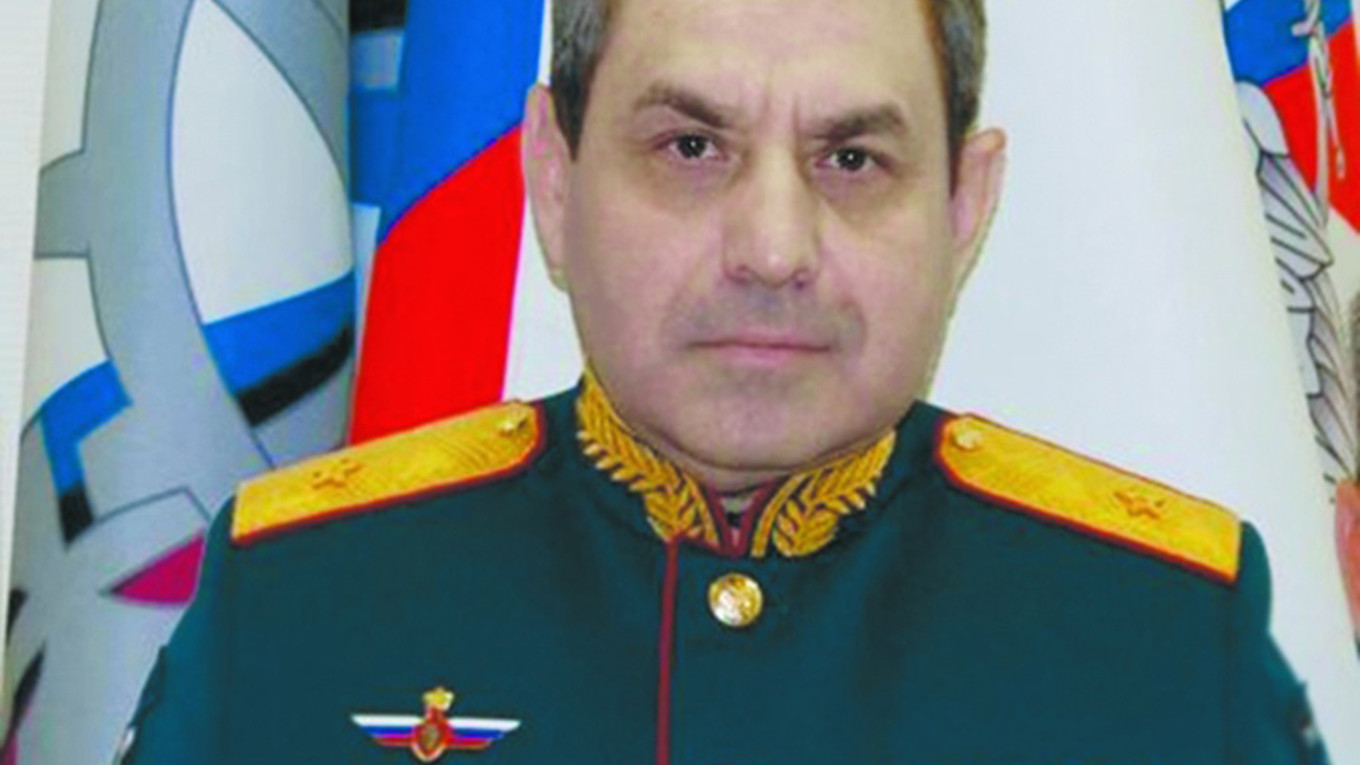
- Military career
- Allegiance: Russia
- Branch: Russian Armed Forces
- Rank: Major general
- Commands: Deputy Commander of the Leningrad Military District
- Conflicts: Russo-Ukrainian War; Russian invasion of Ukraine

Valery Mumindzhanov is a Russian major general who served as the deputy commander of the newly reformed Leningrad Military District. On September 2, 2024, it was announced Mumindzhanov was arrested on corruption charges.

== Biography ==
On September 2, 2024, it was announced Mumindzhanov was arrested for taking a 20 million rouble (~223,000 USD) bribe. The bribe was from an army supplier to secure a contract for military uniforms. At the time of the bribe Mumindzhanov was the head of a department which sourced supplies and resources for the Defense Ministry, with the contract being worth an estimated 1.5 billion roubles ($16.75 million). The Russian Investigative Committee claimed that they were tipped off to Mumindzhanov's corruption due to his vast properties in the Moscow and Voronezh regions valued at 120 million roubles ($1.3 million). The committee did not specify when he was arrested, but that they are awaiting a court ruling to decide the terms of his pre-trial custody.

Mumindzhanov was a direct subordinate of former Deputy Defense Minister Dmitry Bulgakov who saw his own corruption charges on July 26, 2024. Mumindzhanov was the ninth leading Russian military official to be arrested on charges of fraud, bribery or abuse of office joining Deputy Defense Ministers Timur Ivanov and Pavel Popov, as well as other allies of former minister of defense Sergei Shoigu. The Institute for the Study of War has assessed that the arrest of Mumindzhanov was part of an ongoing purge by Andrey Belousov to remove allies of Shoigu from important positions.

Military offices
Preceded by Position Established	Commander of the Leningrad Military District; 2024	Succeeded by To be announced
