= 2nd Guards Artillery Division =

Disbanded Soviet artillery division

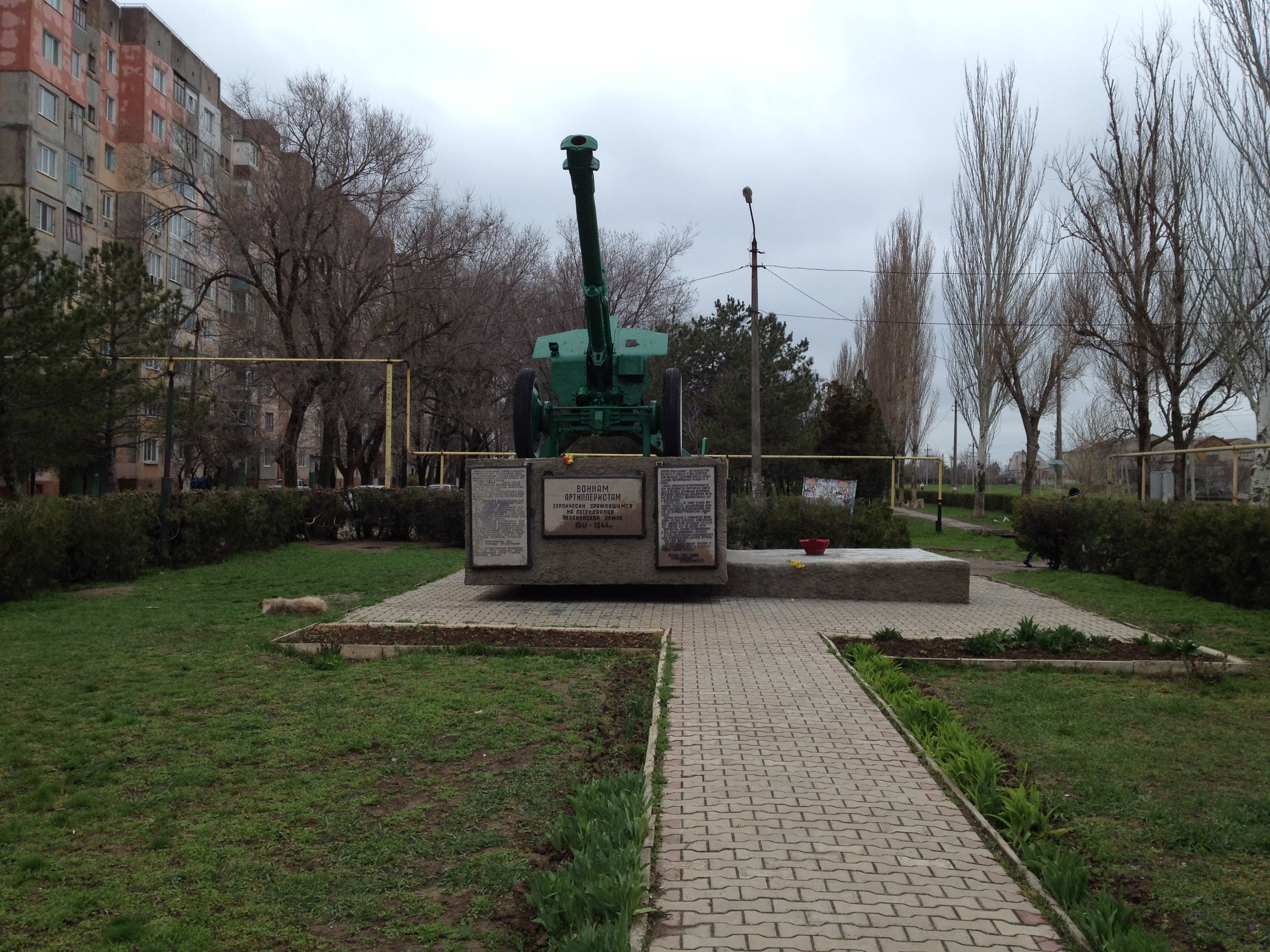
A memorial in Armyansk in honor of the artillery formations that took part in the liberation of Armyansk during the defeat of the Nazi troops in the Crimea (November 1943 - April 1944): 2nd Guards Perekop Red Banner Order of Suvorov Artillery Breakthrough Division

The 2nd Guards Artillery Perekop Red Banner Order of Suvorov Division was an artillery formation of the Soviet Army - Soviet Ground Forces - from c.1946 to 1993.

The 4th Artillery Division was formed in the early war years, and then in April 1943 it was reorganised as the 2nd Guards Artillery Breakthrough Division. Seemingly in the late 1940s the "Breakthrough" name was withdrawn from the title.

During the Second World War the division fought with the 51st Army; the 2nd Guards Army; and the 1st Shock Army. On 1 June 1943 the division was part of the 51st Army.

After the war, the 2nd Guards Artillery Division was withdrawn from the Baltic to the Leningrad Military District, to the city of Pushkin. Some forces were garrisoned at Pavlovsk, four kilometres away. The composition of its brigades after the war underwent some changes, and their numbering also changed - in 1946 it included 5 brigades: the 4th Light Guards, military unit 25756 (August 5, 1945, reorganized into 42nd Guards Heavy Mortar), 5th Howitzer and 6th Heavy Howitzer, 19th Cannon, as well as the 165th High Power Howitzer and 39th Guards Mortar transferred from the 28th Artillery Division.

The composition of the division for 1946:

- 5th Guards Howitzer Artillery Sevastopol Red Banner Brigade
- 6th Guards Cannon Artillery Sevastopol Brigade
- 42nd Guards Heavy Mortar Sevastopol Red Banner Order of the Suvorov Brigade (until 07/23/1945 4th Brigade)
- 19th Guards Cannon Artillery Rezhitsa Brigade
- 165th howitzer brigade of high power
- 39th Guards Mortar Brigade

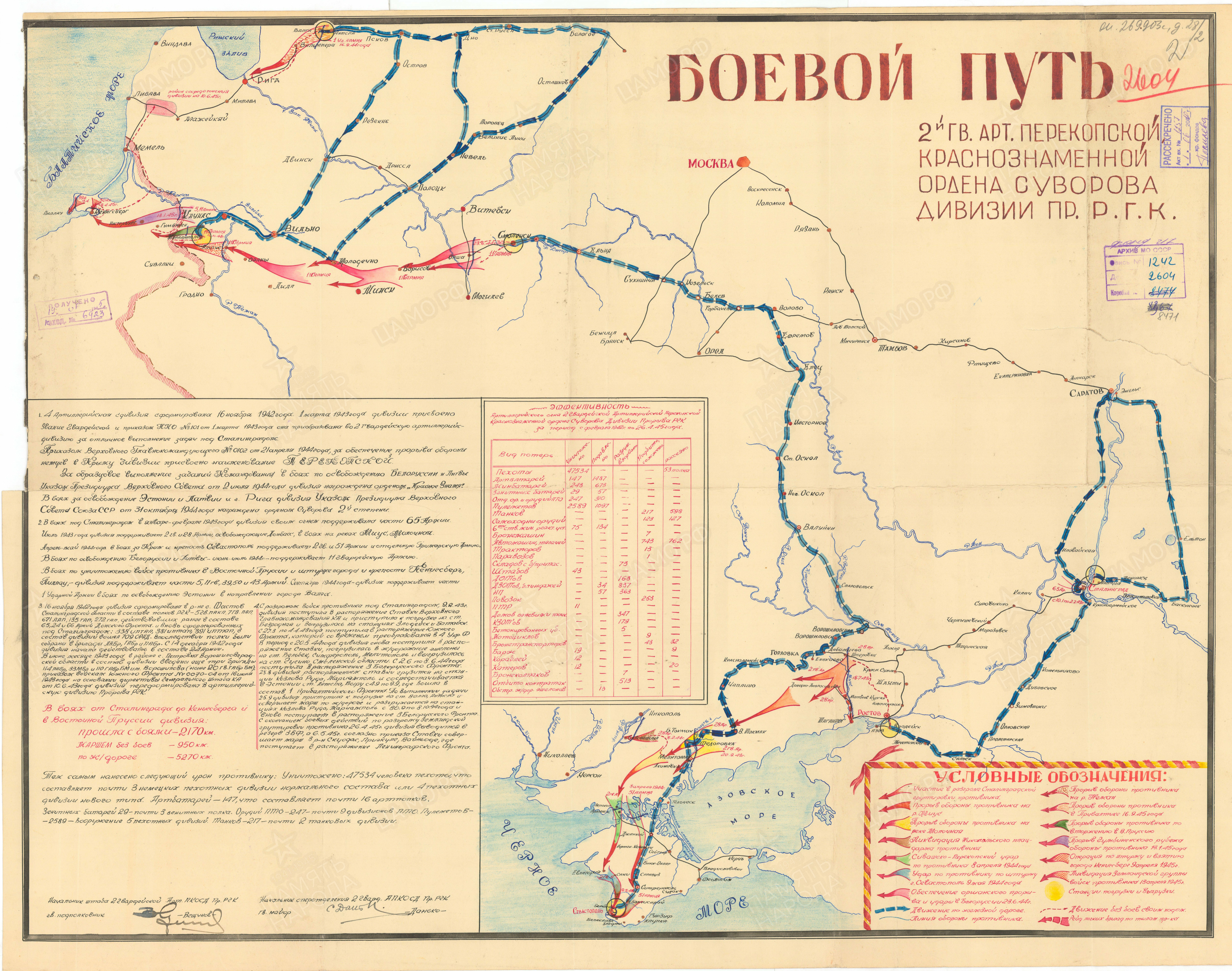
Fighting Way of the 2nd Guards Breakthrough Artillery Division

By the beginning of the 1960s, all these brigades were either disbanded or reduced to the level of regiments. In 1960 the 19th Guards Cannon Artillery Brigade was withdrawn from the division and transferred to the Strategic Rocket Forces. In November 1960 in Vypolzovo in Tver Oblast, on the basis of the brigade, the 7th Rocket Engineering Brigade was formed, Military Unit Number 14245. The 7th Guards Rocket Engineering Brigade later became the 7th Guards Rocket Division.

The composition of the division for 1970:

- 457th Guards Howitzer Artillery Regiment (Pushkin, Leningrad Oblast) - former 5th Guards Howitzer Artillery Brigade
- 458th Guards Cannon Artillery Regiment (Pavlovsk, Leningrad Oblast) - former 6th Guards Heavy Howitzer Artillery Brigade
- 463rd Guards Howitzer Artillery Regiment (Pushkin, Leningrad Oblast) - former 45th Guards Heavy Mortar Brigade
- Reconnaissance Artillery Battalion (Pushkin, Leningrad Oblast)

In 1971, the 463rd Guards Howitzer Artillery Regiment was reorganized into the 463rd Guards Rocket Artillery Regiment. In 1974, the division included the 315th and 316th (formed from the 20th Guards Cannon Artillery Brigade) Guards Heavy Howitzer Artillery Regiments, and in 1976, the 258th Anti-tank Artillery Regiment. In 1989, the 315th Guards Heavy Howitzer Artillery Regiment was deployed into the 287th Guards Heavy Howitzer Artillery Brigade, and the reconnaissance artillery regiment was disbanded. In 1991, the 316th Guards Heavy Howitzer Artillery Regiment was reorganised into the 285th Guards Heavy Howitzer Artillery Brigade, and the 458th Guards Cannon Artillery Regiment into the 268th Guards Cannon Artillery Brigade.

The division was disbanded in 1993.
