= 9th Guards Artillery Brigade =

- Sleeve badge of the 9th Guards Artillery Brigade
- Active: 1944–present
- Country: Soviet Union (1944–1991); Russia (1992–present)
- Branch: Red Army (Soviet Army from 1946) Russian Ground Forces
- Type: Brigade
- Role: Artillery
- Part of: Leningrad Military District; 6th Combined Arms Army
- Garrison/HQ: Luga
- Nicknames: Kielce; Berlin
- Engagements: World War II
- Decorations: Order of Kutuzov; Order of Bogdan Khmelnitsky; Order of Alexander Nevsky; Order of the Red Star
- Battle honours: Guards

The 9th Guards Artillery Kielce-Berlin Order of Kutuzov, Bogdan Khmelnitsky, Alexander Nevsky and the Red Star Brigade is an artillery brigade of the Russian Ground Forces. During the years of the Great Patriotic War - a tactical formation of the Red Army. Since 1946, the brigade formed part of the Soviet Ground Forces. Since 1992 it has been located at Luga, Leningrad Oblast.

Military Unit Number (v/ch) 02561. Abbreviated name - 9 Guards. abr. The formation is part of the 6th Guards Combined Arms Army, Leningrad Military District.

== World War II ==
The brigade traces its history from the 200th Light Artillery Brigade formed on October 1, 1944 at the Sandomierz bridgehead in Poland.

On April 4, 1945, "for the exemplary performance of command assignments and the courage and courage shown by the personnel in battles against the Nazi invaders," the 200th Light Artillery Brigade was awarded "Guards" status and transformed into the 71st Guards Light Artillery Brigade as part of 4th Guards Tank Army, 1st Ukrainian Front.

Subsequently, the brigade participated in the battles to capture the city of Neisse (now Nysa) and for the high combat skills of the personnel she was awarded the Order of Bogdan Khmelnitsky 2nd degree (April 26, 1945).

In the Berlin offensive operation of 1945, the brigade successfully supported army units with well-aimed fire when breaking through defensive lines on the outskirts of the German capital and storming it.

== Postwar ==
In 1960 the 71st Guards Light Artillery Brigade was renamed the 113th Guards Cannon Artillery Regiment. in 1981 the regiment was renamed the 387th Guards Artillery Brigade. From 1945 onwards the brigade was part of the 20th Guards Combined Arms Army.

The brigade was moved home from Jüterbog-Altes Lager in eastern Germany to Luga, Leningrad Oblast, in May 1992. On its return to the Russian Federation it became part of the Leningrad Military District. In 1993 the 289th Artillery Brigade of High Power was merged into the 387th Guards Artillery Brigade, which was renamed the 9th Guards Artillery Brigade.

== Literature ==
- Н. В. Огарков (1977). "Келецко-Берлинская лёгкая артиллерийская бригада" [Kielc-Berlin Light Artillery Brigade]. Soviet Military Encyclopedia [Советская Военная Энциклопедия: В 8 томах]. Vol. 4. Moscow: Voenizdat. p. 138.
