= 131st Rocket Brigade =

- Active: 1960–1993
- Country: Soviet Union (1960–1991); Russia (1992–1993)
- Branch: Soviet Army (1960–1991); Russian Ground Forces (1992–1993)
- Type: Tactical ballistic missile brigade
- Part of: Leningrad Military District
- Garrison/HQ: Luga
- Decorations: Order of Suvorov 3rd class
- Battle honours: Rezekne

The 131st Rocket Brigade was a tactical ballistic missile brigade of the Soviet Army and Russian Ground Forces from 1960 to 1993. Based at Luga, Leningrad Oblast, it was part of the Leningrad Military District. It was formed from an anti-aircraft artillery regiment.

== History ==
The 240th Anti-Aircraft Artillery Regiment was part of the 10th Guards Army at the beginning of August 1943, the first time it appears in the Combat composition of the Soviet Army. The regiment remained with the 10th Guards Army for the rest of the war.

The regiment helped capture Rezekne in July 1944 under command of Lieutenant Colonel Viktor Petrovich Kazantsev. For its actions the regiment was awarded the honorific "Rezekne". During World War II, the regiment also received the Order of Suvorov 3rd class. Between 1945 and 1960 it was known as the 240th Anti-Aircraft Artillery Regiment.

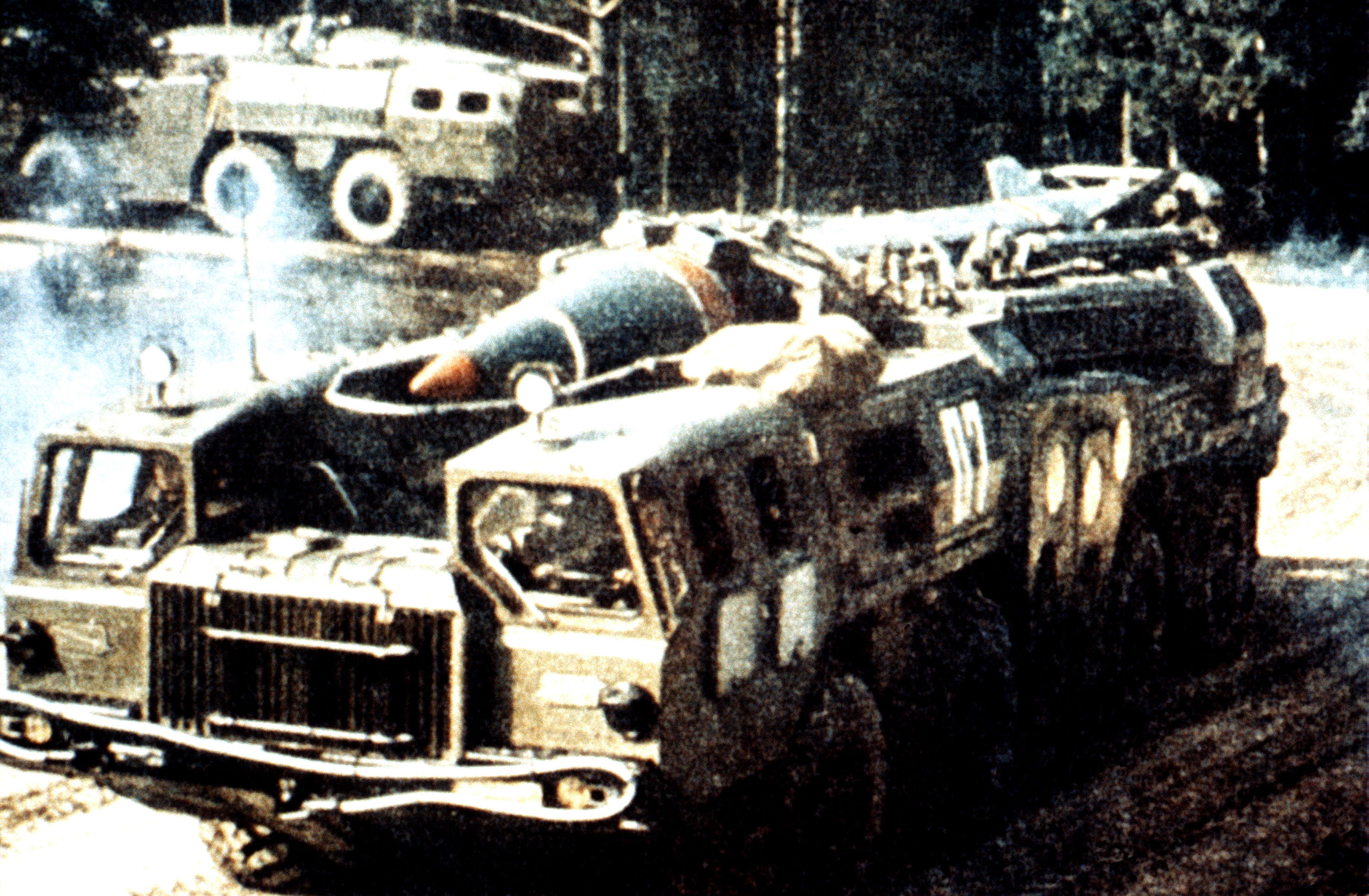
R-17 Elbrus missiles of the type used by the 131st Rocket Brigade

The brigade was formed in 1960 in Luga with the Leningrad Military District, apparently from parts of the 240th Anti-Aircraft Artillery Regiment. Other elements of the regiment became the 59th Anti-Aircraft Rocket Brigade. It included three separate rocket battalions and a technical battery. It was equipped with R-11 Zemlya and R-17 Elbrus tactical ballistic missiles. The brigade was disbanded in 1993.
