= 26th Rocket Brigade =

- Active: 1993-present
- Country: Russia
- Branch: Russian Ground Forces
- Part of: 6th Guards Combined Arms Army
- Garrison/HQ: Luga, Leningrad Oblast

The 26th Rocket Brigade (Military Unit Number 54006) is a brigade of the Russian Ground Forces, stationed at Luga, Leningrad Oblast in the Leningrad Military District. It is equipped with the 9K720 Iskander surface-to surface missile.

== History ==
After a merge of two organizations in 1993, it traces its history to the creation of the 149th Guards "Nemanskaya Red Banner orders of Suvorov, Kutuzov and Aleksandr Nevskiy" Artillery Division in 1974.

It traces its history to the 149th Cannon Artillery Neman Red Banner Order of Suvorov, Kutuzov and Alexander Nevsky Brigade. The 149th Cannon Artillery Brigade was formed on May 28, 1944, on the basis of the 403rd Howitzer Artillery Regiment of High Power (ru:403-й гаубичный артиллерийский полк большой мощности), the 537th cannon artillery regiment and the 827th separate army reconnaissance artillery battalion. The 403rd Howitzer Regiment was separated from the 108th High Power Howitzer Regiment in 1939. It was armed with 24 203mm howitzers. It was part of the frontline army from June 22, 1941, to July 27, 1941, and from October 16, 1941, to April 22, 1944. On June 22, 1941, the 403rd Howitzer Regiment was stationed in Kolomna. With the outbreak of war, another regiment was established at the base of the regiment, the 590th Howitzer Artillery Regiment of High Power, and the 403rd regiment was sent to the disposal of the Western Front. The regiment arrived in Orsha, but already on July 12, 1941, returned to Vyazma without materiel. It remains unknown whether the regiment lost guns in Orsha or on the march, or whether the guns were not transported to Orsha. Since one divizion (battalion) from the regiment participated in some kind of military operations jointly with the 102nd Tank Division was planned for mid-July 1941, it is obvious that the regiment had some kind of materiel. But on July 27, 1941, the regiment was withdrawn from the front line to the rear, where it remains until mid-October 1941. Apparently, in the fall of 1941, it was re-armed with 122-mm guns. In the second half of October 1941, the 403rd Howitzer Regiment was transferred to the 43rd Army. After the formation of the 149th Cannon Artillery Brigade, the brigade took part in Operation Bagration in Belarus in 1944, in the East Prussian operation, and the Battle of Königsberg. After the war, reportedly circa 1974, it was reorganised into the 149th Artillery Division in Kaliningrad. Initial reports suggested the division was reduced in status to the 3598th Base for Storage of Weapons and Equipment in the late 1980s; now it appears that the division was actually disbanded in July 1993 and its lineage, honors, and awards transferred to the 26th Rocket Brigade.

The 463rd Rocket Brigade was initially formed in 1988 in Kaliningrad as a surface-to-surface missile unit. It was moved to Luga in 1993 and took over the honors and awards from the 149th Artillery Division, becoming the 26th Rocket Brigade.
