= Bugry, Ustyuzhensky District, Vologda Oblast =

Bugry Бугры
- Village
- Location within Vologda Oblast Location within Russia
- Coordinates: 58°52′N 37°04′E
- Country: Russia
- Region: Vologda Oblast
- District: Ustyuzhensky District
- Time zone: UTC+3:00

Bugry (Russian: Бугры) is a rural locality (a village) in Modenskoye Rural Settlement, Ustyuzhensky District, Vologda Oblast, Russia. The population was 2 as of 2002. There are 2 streets.

== Geography ==
Bugry is located 44 km (27 mi) east of Ustyuzhna (the district's administrative centre) by road. Martynovo is the nearest rural locality.
