= Luga, Russia =

Luga (Russian: Луга) is the name of several inhabited localities in Russia.

Urban localities

- Luga, Leningrad Oblast, a town under the administrative jurisdiction of Luzhskoye Settlement Municipal Formation in Luzhsky District of Leningrad Oblast

Rural localities

- Luga, Novgorod Oblast, a village in Bolshevisherskoye Settlement of Malovishersky District in Novgorod Oblast
