= 346th Rocket Brigade =

21st Missile Brigade (1961-1992) 346th Missile Brigade (1992-1998)
- Active: 1961-1998
- Country: Soviet Union (1961-1991); Russia (1992-1998)
- Branch: Soviet Army (1961-1991); Russian Ground Forces (1992-1998)
- Type: Tactical Ballistic Missile Brigade
- Part of: Leningrad Military District
- Garrison/HQ: Oselki

The 346th Missile Brigade was a Tactical ballistic missile brigade of the Russian Ground Forces from 1992 to 1998. The brigade was first formed as the 21st Missile Brigade in 1961 and became the 346th Missile Brigade in 1992. It was based at Oselki, part of the Leningrad Military District.

== History ==
The 21st Missile Brigade was formed in July 1961 at Oselki, part of the Leningrad Military District. It was composed of the 273rd and 505th Separate Missile Battalions, as well as a technical battery. The brigade was equipped with R-11 Zemlya (SS-1B Scud A) tactical ballistic missiles. In August 1963, the 273rd Separate Missile Battalion was transferred to the 23rd Rocket Brigade and was replaced by the newly activated 312th and 866th Separate Missile Battalions. In December 1992, the brigade was redesignated as the 346th Missile Brigade. It also received newer OTR-21 Tochka tactical ballistic missiles. The brigade was disbanded in 1998.
