= 2nd Guards Spetsnaz Brigade =

Russian Armed Forces Brigade

2nd Guards Separate Special Purpose Order of Zhukov Brigade
- 2-я отдельная бригада специального назначения
- Shoulder sleeve patch
- Active: 1962–present
- Country: Soviet Union (1962–1991); Russia (1991–present)
- Branch: Spetsnaz GRU
- Type: Special forces
- Size: Brigade
- Garrison/HQ: Promezhitsy, Pskov Oblast
- Engagements: First Chechen War; Second Chechen War; Russo-Georgian War; Russo-Ukrainian war; War in Donbas; Russian invasion of Ukraine; March 2024 western Russia incursion; 2024 Kharkiv offensive
- Decorations: Guards; Order of Zhukov

Commanders
- Current commander: Konstantin Bushuev

The 2nd Guards Separate Special Purpose Order of Zhukov Brigade (Note: Russian: 2-я отдельная гвардейская ордена Жукова бригада специального назначения, romanized: 2-ya otdelnaya gvardeyskaya ordena Zhukova brigada spetsialnogo naznacheniya) is a Spetsnaz GRU brigade of the Russian Armed Forces based in Promezhitsy, Pskov Oblast.

== History ==
As part of increases to the GRU's Spetsnaz, on July 19, 1962, General Staff of the USSR Armed Forces Directive No. 140547 was issued, by which the 2nd Spetsnaz Brigade was to be formed in the Leningrad Military District. The creation of the brigade began on September 17, 1962 and ended on March 1, 1963.

Until 2008 or 2013, Dmitry Utkin served as lieutenant colonel and brigade commander of a unit of special forces of Russia's Main Intelligence Directorate (GRU), the 700th Independent Spetsnaz Detachment of the 2nd Independent Brigade.

The Brigade participated in the Russian invasion of Ukraine. On July 11, 2022, Russian president Vladimir Putin awarded the unit the honorific unit status Guards for its actions in Ukraine.

== Structure ==
The brigade comprises:

- 2nd Guards Spetsnaz Brigade
  - Headquarters
  - Signals Battalion (2x Company)
  - Support Company
  - 70th Special Purpose Detachment (roughly battalion equivalent)
  - 329th Special Purpose Detachment
  - 700th Special Purpose Detachment
  - Training Battalion (2x Company)
