= Vladimirsky Lager =

Rural locality in Pskov Oblast, Russia

Vladimirsky Lager Владимирский Лагерь
- Mestechko
- Interactive map of Vladimirsky Lager
- Location of Vladimirsky Lager Vladimirsky Lager (Pskov Oblast)
- Coordinates: 58°13′N 29°04′E
- Country: Russia
- Federal subject: Pskov Oblast
- Founded: 1905

Population
  - Estimate (2021): 1,575 )

Municipal status
  - Municipal district: Strugo-Krasnensky Municipal District
  - Urban settlement: Strugi Krasnye Urban Settlement
- Time zone: UTC+3 (MSK)
- Postal code: 181111
- OKTMO ID: 58656151111

Vladimirsky Lager (Russian: Влади́мирский Ла́герь) is a rural locality (mestechko) in Strugo-Krasnensky District of Pskov Oblast, Russia.

Administratively, it is subordinated to the urban-type settlement of Strugi Krasnye. Municipally, it is a part of Strugi Krasnye Urban Settlement.

== History ==
The village was founded in 1905 per the ukase of Tsar Nicholas II as an artillery range. Originally, it was named after the nearby Bronevskaya railway platform, but was named for Grand Duke Vladimir Alexandrovich soon after.

== Modern times ==
The military base at Vladimirsky Lager was expanded in 1958 for the 2nd Guards Tank Division, relocated there from the Estonian SSR. After the 2nd Guards transferred to Mongolia in 1970, the base was used by the newly formed 250th Reserve Motor Rifle Division. Three cadre regiments of the 151st Motor Rifle Division also were stationed there between 1972 and 1989. After the fall of the Soviet Union, the 250th Division was disbanded in 1994. The 133rd Guards Anti-Aircraft Rocket Brigade, which had previously been based in Germany, was withdrawn to the village. In April 2006 the brigade and the 141st Anti-Aircraft Rocket Brigade were combined into the 1544th Anti-Aircraft Rocket Regiment and transferred to the 54th Air Defense Corps. In 2012, it was relocated to Pskov.

In November 1993, the 25th Guards Motor Rifle Brigade arrived from Adazi. In 1995 its previous parent 54th District Training Centre, in the Baltic Military District (previously the 24th Tank Training Division) disbanded. The 25th Brigade was a low readiness formation but has now been expanded and has run several exercises practising callup of conscripts in the last ten years.

The village also has a train station which is a stop on the Warsaw – Saint Petersburg Railway.

== Sources ==
- Псковское областное Собрание депутатов. Закон №420-оз от 28 февраля 2005 г. «Об установлении границ и статусе вновь образуемых муниципальных образований на территории Псковской области», в ред. Закона №1542-ОЗ от 5 июня 2015 г. «О внесении изменений в Закон Псковской области "Об установлении границ и статусе вновь образуемых муниципальных образований на территории Псковской области"». Вступил в силу со дня официального опубликования. Опубликован: "Псковская правда", №41–43, №44–46, №49–51, 4 марта 2005 г., 5 марта 2005 г., 11 марта 2005 г. (Pskov Oblast Council of Deputies. Law #420-oz of February 28, 2005 On Establishing the Borders and the Status of the Newly Formed Municipal Formations on the Territory of Pskov Oblast, as amended by the Law #1542-OZ of June 5, 2015 On Amending the Law of Pskov Oblast "On Establishing the Borders and the Status of the Newly Formed Municipal Formations on the Territory of Pskov Oblast". Effective as of the official publication date.).
