= Bugry =

Bugry Бугры
- Settlement
- Location within Altai Krai Location within Russia
- Coordinates: 51°17′N 81°26′E
- Country: Russia
- Region: Altai Krai
- District: Rubtsovsky District
- Time zone: UTC+7:00

Bugry (Russian: Бугры) is a rural locality (a settlement) in Novonikolayevsky Selsoviet, Rubtsovsky District, Altai Krai, Russia. The population was 172 as of 2013. There are 2 streets.

== Geography ==
Bugry is located 42 km southeast of Rubtsovsk (the district's administrative centre) by road. Pokrovka is the nearest rural locality.
