= Vaganovo =

Vaganovo Ваганово
- Village
- Location within Vladimir Oblast Location within Russia
- Coordinates: 56°05′N 39°56′E
- Country: Russia
- Region: Vladimir Oblast
- District: Sobinsky District
- Time zone: UTC+3:00

Vaganovo (Russian: Ваганово) is a rural locality (a village) in Kurilovskoye Rural Settlement, Sobinsky District, Vladimir Oblast, Russia. The population was 23 as of 2010.

== Geography ==
Vaganovo is located on the Vezhbolovka River, 19 km north of Sobinka (the district's administrative centre) by road. Yurovo is the nearest rural locality.
