= Mechnikovo =

Mechnikovo Мечниково
- Selo
- Location within Bashkortostan Location within Russia
- Coordinates: 53°54′N 54°55′E
- Country: Russia
- Region: Bashkortostan
- District: Alsheyevsky District
- Time zone: UTC+5:00

Mechnikovo (Russian: Мечниково) is a rural locality (a selo) in Nizhneavryuzovsky Selsoviet, Alsheyevsky District, Bashkortostan, Russia. The population was 435 as of 2010. There are 8 streets.

== Geography ==
Mechnikovo is located 26 km south of Rayevsky (the district's administrative centre) by road. Nizhneye Avryuzovo is the nearest rural locality.
