= 5th Anti-Aircraft Missile Brigade =

5th Anti-Aircraft Missile Brigade (1971–present) 919th Anti-Aircraft Missile Regiment (1961–1971)
- Russian: 5-я зенитная ракетная бригада
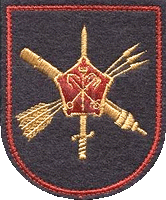
- Sleeve patch of the 5th Anti-Aircraft Missile Brigade
- Active: 1961–present
- Country: Soviet Union (1961–1991); Russia (1992–present)
- Branch: Soviet Army (1961–1991); Russian Ground Forces (1992–present)
- Type: Surface-to-air missile brigade
- Part of: Leningrad Military District; 6th Combined Arms Army
- Garrison/HQ: Gorelovo; MUN 74429
- Combat Banner
- Equipment: SA-11 Buk

Commanders
- Current commander: Colonel Igor Sobelev

The 5th Anti-Aircraft Missile Brigade (Russian: 5-я зенитная ракетная бригада (5-я зрбр), romanized: 5-ya zenitnaya raketnaya brigada (5-ya zrbr)) is an air defence brigade of the Russian Ground Forces' 6th Army, stationed at Gorelovo in Saint Petersburg.

Formed in 1961 at Uzhhorod in Ukraine as the 919th Separate Anti-Aircraft Missile Regiment, it was equipped with the S-75. In 1968, the regiment was included in the Central Group of Forces (Czechoslovakia) and relocated to the town of Kurzhivody (Kuřivody) next to the city of Mimoni (Mimoň). In the early 1970s the brigade reequipped with the 2K11 Krug (SA-4 'Ganef'). In 1989, the brigade was reequipped with the Buk M1 (SA-11 'Gadfly'), and in June 1990, was relocated to Shuya. The brigade was relocated to Lomonosov and Nenimyaki in 2009, and Gorelovo in 2012.

== History ==
=== Cold War ===
As a result of an expansion of the Soviet air defence troops, the 919th Separate Anti-Aircraft Missile Regiment was formed in Uzhorod between 20 September and 20 November 1961 as part of the 38th Army. The 919th was equipped with the S-75 Dvina surface-to-air missile (SAM) and was commanded by Colonel Ivan Antonovich Guly. Between June 1962 and April 1965 the regiment was stationed at Svaliava. In August 1968, attached to the 28th Army Corps, the brigade participated in Operation Danube, the suppression of the Prague Spring. After the end of the invasion, the 919th stayed in Czechoslovakia at Chervona Vody, as part of the Central Group of Forces.

In 1971, the regiment was equipped with the new 2K11 Krug SAM and converted into the 5th Anti-Aircraft Missile Brigade. It was moved to Kurivody (now in Ralsko) at the same time and became part of the 28th Army Corps. The 350th Separate Anti-Aircraft Missile Battalion was based at Plzeň, the 1096th at Chervona Vody, and the 1097th at Kurivody. In 1989 the brigade was reequipped with the new Buk missile system, and added a new battalion, the 1095th at Kurivody. In June 1990, as part of the withdrawal of the Central Group of Forces from Czechoslovakia, the 5th Brigade was relocated to Shuya, Ivanovo Oblast, and became part of the 22nd Army.

=== Service in the Russian Ground Forces ===
In 1992, the brigade participated in the "Oborona-92" air defence exercises and research tests at Embi, Kazakhstan. From 1993 to 1999, the 5th Brigade was part of the CIS (mainly Russian) peacekeeping force in Abkhazia, providing air defense for the Russian base at Gudauta. In 1995, the brigade participated in the "Phoenix-95" demonstration exercise at Embi, which resulted in foreign countries making contracts to acquire SAMs. In 2006 and 2008, the brigade conducted live fire tactical exercises at Kapustin Yar. In 2008, the 5th Brigade was recognized as the best SAM brigade in the 22nd Army and the Moscow Military District. On 18 November 2009, it was relocated to Lomonosov and Nenimyaki near St. Petersburg, becoming part of the 6th Army. On 24 February 2012, the brigade was transferred to Gorelovo in St. Petersburg.

== Commanders ==
The following officers are known to have commanded the regiment and brigade.

- Colonel Ivan Antonovich Guly (1961–1964)
- Colonel Sergey Valeryevich Oleynik (1989–1998)
- Colonel Vitaly Georgyevich Shkutko (1998–2004)
- Colonel Sergey Stepanovich Melnikov (2007–2011)
- Colonel Viktor Ivanovich Pigarev (2011–2013)
- Colonel Igor Valentinovich Sobelev (2013–present)
