= Luga, Leningrad Oblast =

Town in Leningrad Oblast, Russia

Luga Луга
- Town
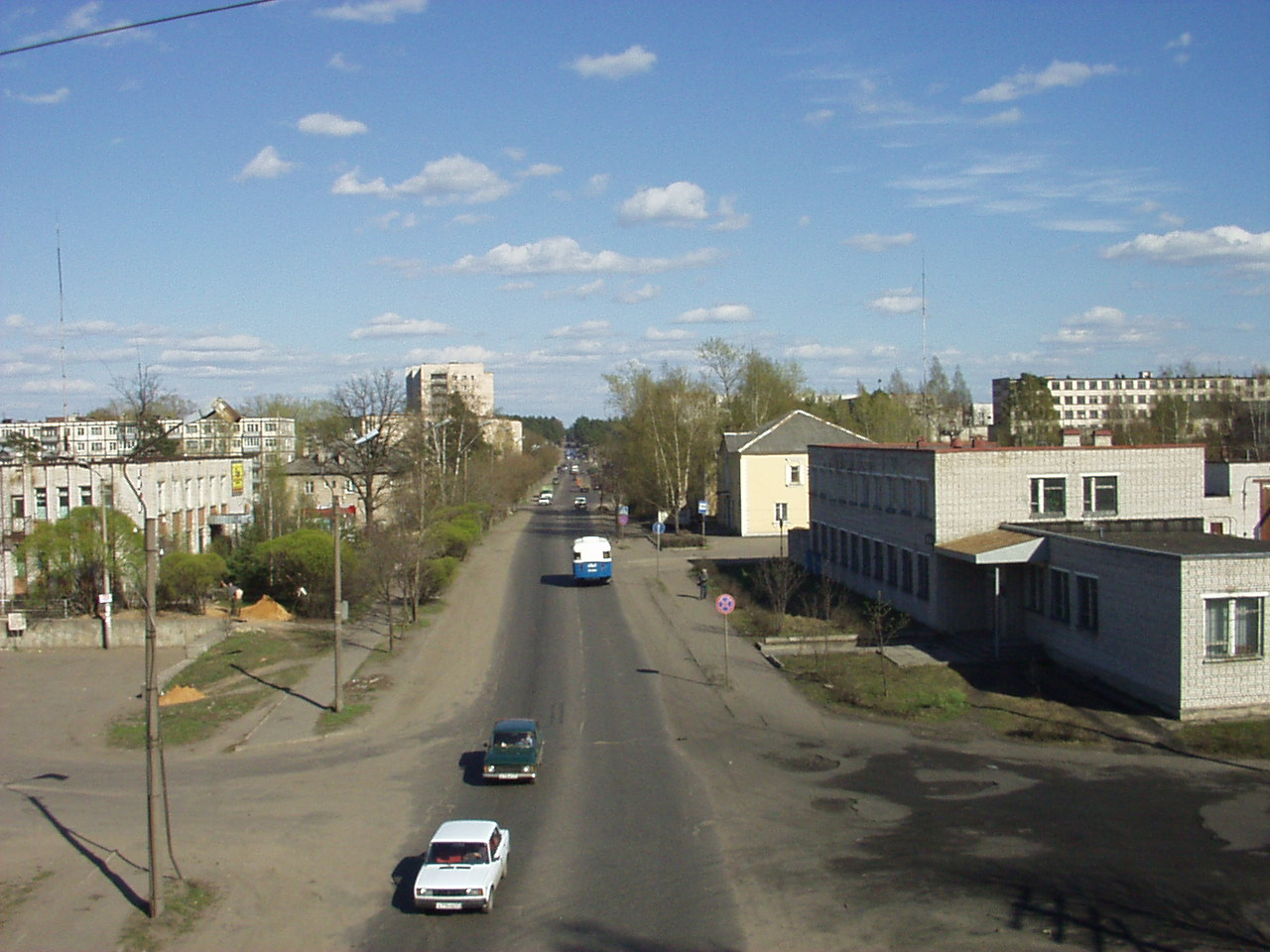
- Luga in 2003

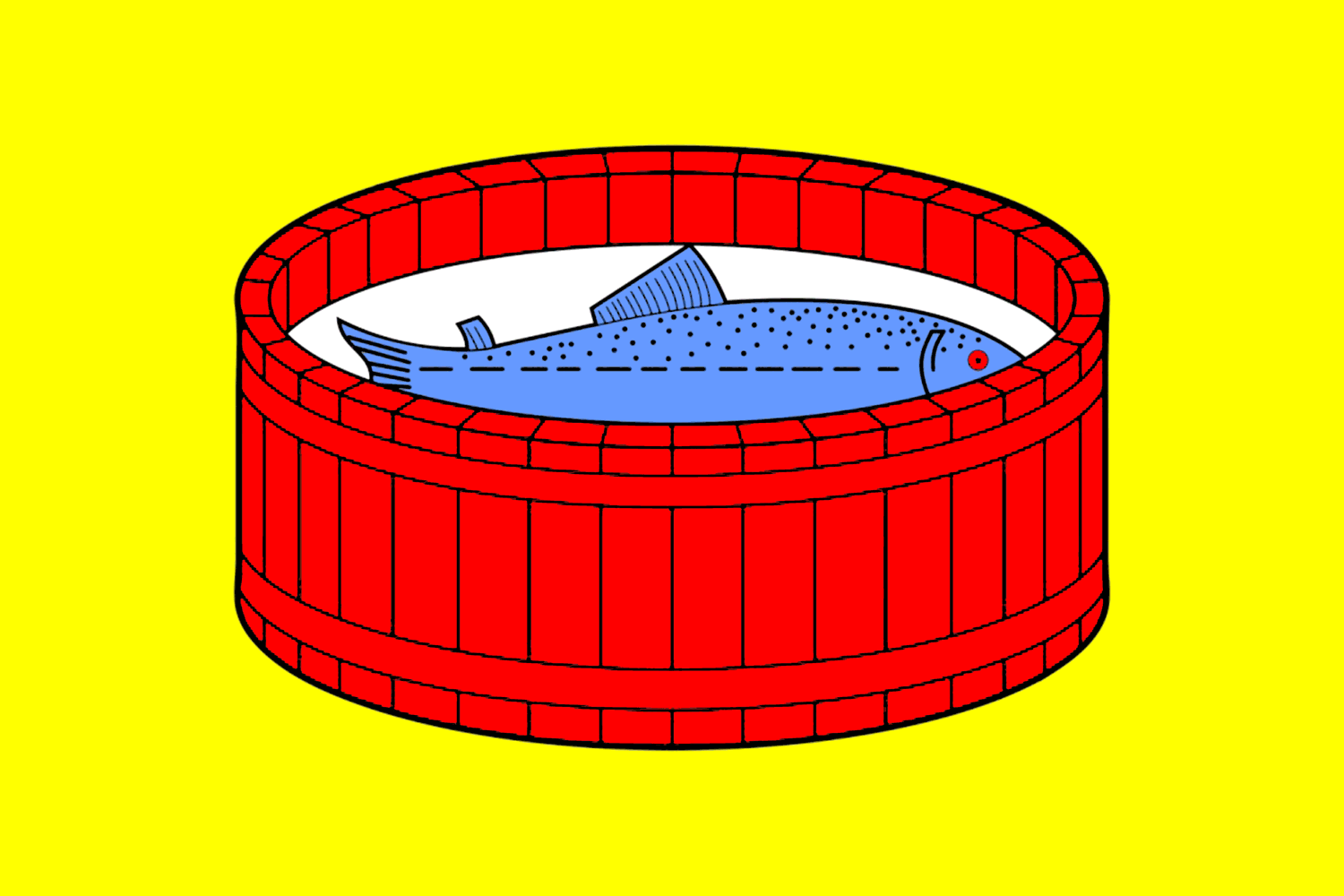
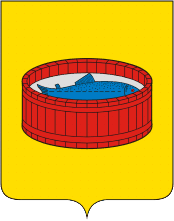
- Flag Coat of arms
- Interactive map of Luga
- Location of Luga Luga (Leningrad Oblast)
- Coordinates: 58°44′N 29°49′E
- Country: Russia
- Federal subject: Leningrad Oblast
- Administrative district: Luzhsky District
- Settlement municipal formationSelsoviet: Luzhskoye Settlement Municipal Formation
- Founded: August 3 (14), 1777
- Town status since: August 3 (14), 1777
- Elevation: 48 m (157 ft)

Population (2010 Census)
  - Total: 38,593
  - Estimate (2025): 36,454 (−5.5%)

Administrative status
  - Capital of: Luzhsky District, Luzhskoye Settlement Municipal Formation

Municipal status
  - Municipal district: Luzhsky Municipal District
  - Urban settlement: Luzhskoye Urban Settlement
  - Capital of: Luzhsky Municipal District, Luzhskoye Urban Settlement
- Time zone: UTC+3 (MSK)
- Postal codes: 188230-188233, 188235-188238, 188229, 188299
- Dialing code: +7 81372
- OKTMO ID: 41633101001

Luga (Russian: Лу́га) is a town and the administrative center of Luzhsky District in Leningrad Oblast, Russia, located on the Luga River 140 kilometers (87 mi) south of St. Petersburg. Population: 38,593 (2010 census); 40,434 (2002 census); 41,769 (1989 Soviet census).

== History ==
It was founded on the banks of the river of that name by order of the Catherine the Great on August 3 (14), 1777. The town developed in following stages:

1. Initial construction (1777–c. 1800)
2. Early growth to population of 3,000 (c. 1810–c. 1860)
3. Intense social and urban development (c. 1870–1910)
4. Soviet development according to the typical plan for smaller towns (1926–c. 1950)
5. Reconstruction of the historical town structure (c. 1960–c. 1995)
6. Transition to free market agro-industrial town (c. 1995–2005)

Luga was founded as a town in Pskov Viceroyalty, but in March 3 (14), 1782 it was transferred to St. Petersburg Governorate (renamed Petrogradsky in 1913 and Leningradsky in 1924) and became the seat of Luzhsky Uyezd. In 1918, important events of the Russian Civil War took place in the area, when the White Army unsuccessfully tried to conquer Petrograd.

On August 1, 1927, the uyezds were abolished and Luzhsky District, with the administrative center in Luga, was established. The governorates were also abolished and the district became a part of Luga Okrug of Leningrad Oblast. On July 23, 1930, the okrugs were abolished as well and the districts were directly subordinated to the oblast. On September 19, 1939, Luga became a town of oblast significance and was thus no longer a part of the district.

The World War II German advance on Leningrad was temporarily halted by seven regular, militia, and irregular divisions in the Luga area and this delayed the commencement of the Siege of Leningrad by over a month. In recognition of this feat, the town was awarded the title of "Hero City" and listed as one of the World War II Cities of Military Glory by Vladimir Putin, the President of Russia. German occupation of Luga lasted from August 24, 1941 to February 12, 1944.

In 2010, the administrative structure of Leningrad Oblast was harmonized with its municipal structure and Luga became a town of district significance.

== Administrative and municipal status ==
Within the framework of administrative divisions, Luga serves as the administrative center of Luzhsky District. As an administrative division, it is, together with four rural localities, incorporated within Luzhsky District as Luzhskoye Settlement Municipal Formation. As a municipal division, Luzhskoye Settlement Municipal Formation is incorporated within Luzhsky Municipal District as Luzhskoye Urban Settlement.

== Economy ==
=== Industry ===
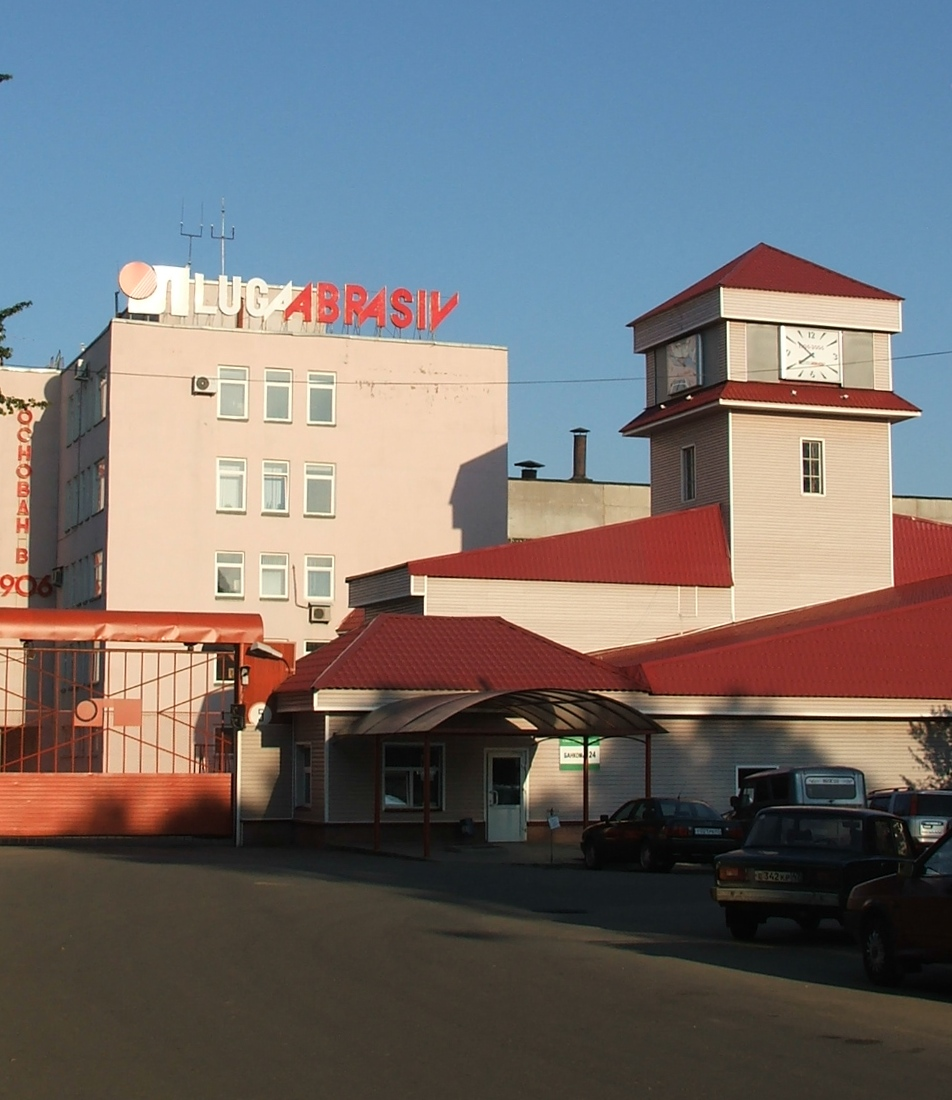
Luga Abrasiv plant - one of the major enterprises of the city

There are enterprises of construction, chemical, and food industries in Luga.

=== Transportation ===
Luga lies on the railway line connecting the Baltiysky railway station of St. Petersburg with Pskov. Another railway line to Batetsky and Veliky Novgorod branches off east. Both have suburban service.

The M20 Highway, connecting St. Petersburg with Pskov and eventually with Kyiv, passes Luga. In Luga, two more roads branch eastwards: one running to Veliky Novgorod and another one to Lyuban and Mga, largely following the border of Leningrad Oblast.

== Education ==
The town has a university (KGU Kirilla and Mefodiya), three Institutes of Technical Education, and six schools.

== Military ==
Luga is home to the 26th Rocket Brigade.

== Culture and recreation ==
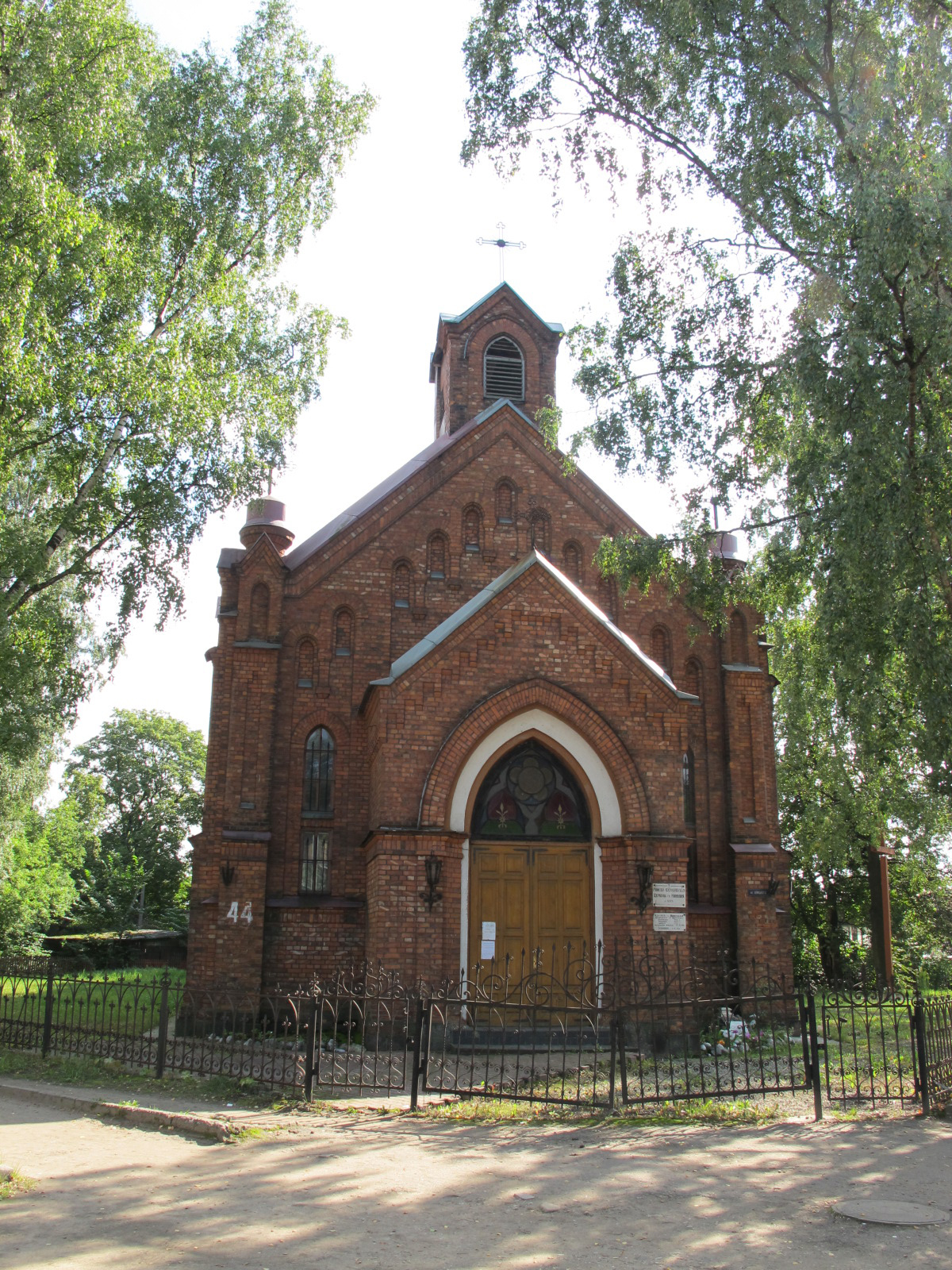
St. Nicholas Roman Catholic church (1904)

Luga contains twenty-five objects classified as cultural and historical heritage of local significance. These include the main sights remaining from the 18th and the 19th century such as the St. Catherine Cathedral (1786) and the Resurrection Cathedral (1872–1877).

The Luzhsky District Museum, the only state museum in the district, is located in Luga.

== Twin towns and sister cities ==
Luga is twinned with:

- Mikkeli, Finland

== Notable people ==
- Anton von Saltza (1843–1916) - general
- Walter Polakov (1879–1948) - mechanical engineer
- Gratsian Botev (1928–1981) - sprint canoer
- Nina Urgant (1929–2021) - film and stage actress
- Boris Marshak (1933–2006) - archeologist
- Gennadi Nilov (1936) - actor
- Lyudmila Besrukova (1945) - sprint canoer
- Georgi Zažitski (1949) - fencer
- Vladimir Bystrov (1984) - footballer
