= Al Shaer =

Al Shaer, Al Shair, El Shaer, Shaer, Shair, etc. is an Arabic surname. Notable people with the surname include:

- Diana Al Shaer
- Hind al Shaer
- Jamal Al Shaer
- Kamal Al-Shair
- Khaled Al Shaer
- Mohamed El Shaer
- Najami Ghani Shaer
- Nasser al-Shaer

== See also ==
- Sha'er
- Shaer gas field
