= Battle of the Shaer gas field (disambiguation) =

Battle of the Shaer gas field may refer to:

- Battle of the Shaer gas field (July 2014).
- Battle of the Shaer gas field (October–November 2014).
- Battle of the Shaer gas field (2016).
