= Battle of the Shaer gas field (October–November 2014) =

Battle of the Syrian civil war

Coordinates: 34.5542°N 38.2833°E

- Part of the Syrian Civil War
Date	28 October – 6 November 2014 (1 week and 2 days)
Location	Palmyra region, Homs Governorate, Syria
Result	Syrian government victory
Territorial changes	ISIL initially captured the Shaer, Jahar and al-Moher gas fields, Hayyan Gas Company and Zimlat al-Maher hill; Syrian government forces recapture all territory that was previously lost

Belligerents
Islamic State	(Syria) Syrian Government

Commanders and leaders
Hassan Abbous (IS emir of Homs)	Col. Suhayl al-Hasan (Overall and Tiger Forces commander); Col. Mohammad Jaber (Suqur al-Sahara commander); Fadi ‘Isma’el † (NDF commander)

Units involved
Military of the Islamic State	Syrian Armed Forces; Syrian Army; 3rd Armoured Division; 18th Armored Brigade; Tiger Forces; Suqur al-Sahara; National Defense Force; Military Intelligence Directorate; Syrian Resistance

Casualties and losses
(Islamic State) 200+ militants killed (Islamic State) 73 militants captured (SAA claim)	58 soldiers killed (SAA claim)

The Battle of the Shaer gas field took place between the Islamic State (IS) and the Syrian government for the control over the Shaer gas field (Sha'er gas field) during the Syrian Civil War. It is the second attack that was launched by the Islamic State on the gas field.

== Background ==
In mid-July 2014, radical jihadists of the Islamic State (IS) attacked and captured the field from government forces, which was followed by an Army counter-attack which drove ISIS back out. It was one of the deadliest battles up-to-date in the war between fighters of the militant group and government troops.

== Battle ==
On 28 October, ISIL re-attacked the Sha'er gas field, leaving at least 30 government troops and an unknown number of ISIS insurgents dead. ISIS managed to capture large parts of the oil and gas field. However, Al-Masdar put the death tolls at 18 government troops and over 30 ISIS militants, while 11 soldiers were wounded. It also claimed that by 9 AM the Army had recaptured parts of the gas field the next day and recaptured wells 101 and 102 of the gas field on the 30th.

SOHR, however, reported that ISIL regained control over the Shaer Gas field on 30 October, forcing the Syrian Army to pull back from the area. According to the MASAR news agency, at this point, 50 soldiers and 15 ISIL fighters were killed in the clashes. It was also reported that ISIS captured 17 soldiers and many military vehicles. The next day, ISIL took control over the Hayyan Gas Company affiliated to Sha’er Gas Field and, according to SOHR, could cut off the Damascus-Tadmor-Homs highway, upon reaching the Hama-Raqqa road junction.

Al-Masdar reported that ISIL had launched a full-scale offensive in the Jabal Sha'ar area, which includes the gas field, and an attack on the T4 airbase was attempted. The Syrian Army managed to repel the attacks on the airbase and subsequently attacked insurgent forces at Umm Rajab farms. Al-Masdar reports of heavy casualties on both sides: government troops suffered 36 dead and 61 wounded, while ISIS lost over 100 fighters. Reinforcements were expected to arrive and boost the SAA's defense of the area.

ISIL also captured the Zimlat al-Maher (Syriatel) hill, forcing the SAA to pull back to the T4 airbase and confirmed that the Sha'er gas field was captured by the militants. He also noted that Rayan gas field, east of Shaer, and Jahar field, south of Shaer, were still under government control.

On 2 November, according to pro-government sources, the Syrian Desert Falcons, a unit composed of veterans specialized in desert warfare, participated in the counter-attack that was launched that day.

On 3 November, ISIL captured the Jahar gas field. The next day, the Army recaptured the village of Kherbet al-Tayyas, northeast of the T4 airbase.

On 5 November, the Syrian Army recaptured the Zimlat al-Maher (Syriatel) hill and secured the road leading to Tadamur and Farkalas and the road to the Tiyas military airport. The military also recaptured the Jahar and al-Moher gas fields as well as the Hayan gas company as ISIL fighters retreated under shelling and air-strikes. ISIL still continued to control parts of the Shaer gas field. According to Al-Masdar, government troops captured 13 ISIS militants the same day, 12 of whom were foreigners (9 Chechens, 2 Saudis and 1 Malaysian).

On 6 November, the Army retook the Shaer gas field and Syriatel Hill from ISIL.

== Aftermath – Continued fighting ==
On 11 November, according to a military source, the Army retook the final oil well (Well 105) captured by ISIL near Sha'er gas field, forcing the militants to retreat towards Al-Hasakah Governorate. However, a few days later, ISIL recaptured Well 107. On 19 November, the second-in-command in the Suqur al-Sahara and vice president of the intelligence branch in the desert, Colonel Mohsen Hussein, was killed in the Shaer area during "a search-and-destroy mission". The Syrian Army also recaptured Well 107. Two days later, the Syrian Army re-captured more positions in the vicinity of Gas Well 107. That day, the number of pro-government troops who died in the previous 24 hours since a new attempt by ISIL to seize the Shaer gas field, rose to 21.

On 23 November, ISIL advanced in the Shaer area, north of Syriatel hill. ISIL than attempted an attack on the hill and a few adjacent locations on 27 November, but the Tiger Forces repelled the attack and moved on a counter-attack which reportedly left 30 IS militants dead.

On 1 December, the Army recaptured Well 105, leaving 77 IS militants dead and 32 captured. No casualties on the government side were given. The recapture of Well 105 meant that the Army recaptured all gas wells captured by ISIL in late October.

In early May 2016, ISIL once again captured the Shaer gas field. 34 soldiers and 16 ISIL fighters were killed during the battle for the field.

== See also ==
- Battle of the Shaer gas field (July 2014)
- Battle of the Shaer gas field (2016)
