= 61st Separate Guards Naval Infantry Brigade =

61st Separate Guards Kirkenes Order of the Red Banner Naval Infantry Brigade
- 61-я отдельная гвардейская Киркенесская Краснознаменная бригада морской пехоты
- Brigade's shoulder sleeve insignia
- Active: 1979–present
- Country: Russia
- Branch: Russian Navy
- Type: Marines
- Size: Brigade
- Part of: Northern Fleet
- Garrison/HQ: Sputnik, Murmansk Oblast
- Engagements: First Chechen War; Second Chechen War; Syrian Civil War; Battle of Palmyra; Russo-Ukrainian War
- Decorations: Order of the Red Banner; Guards
- Battle honours: Kirkenes

Commanders
- Current commander: Colonel Kirill Nikolaevich Nikulin

Insignia
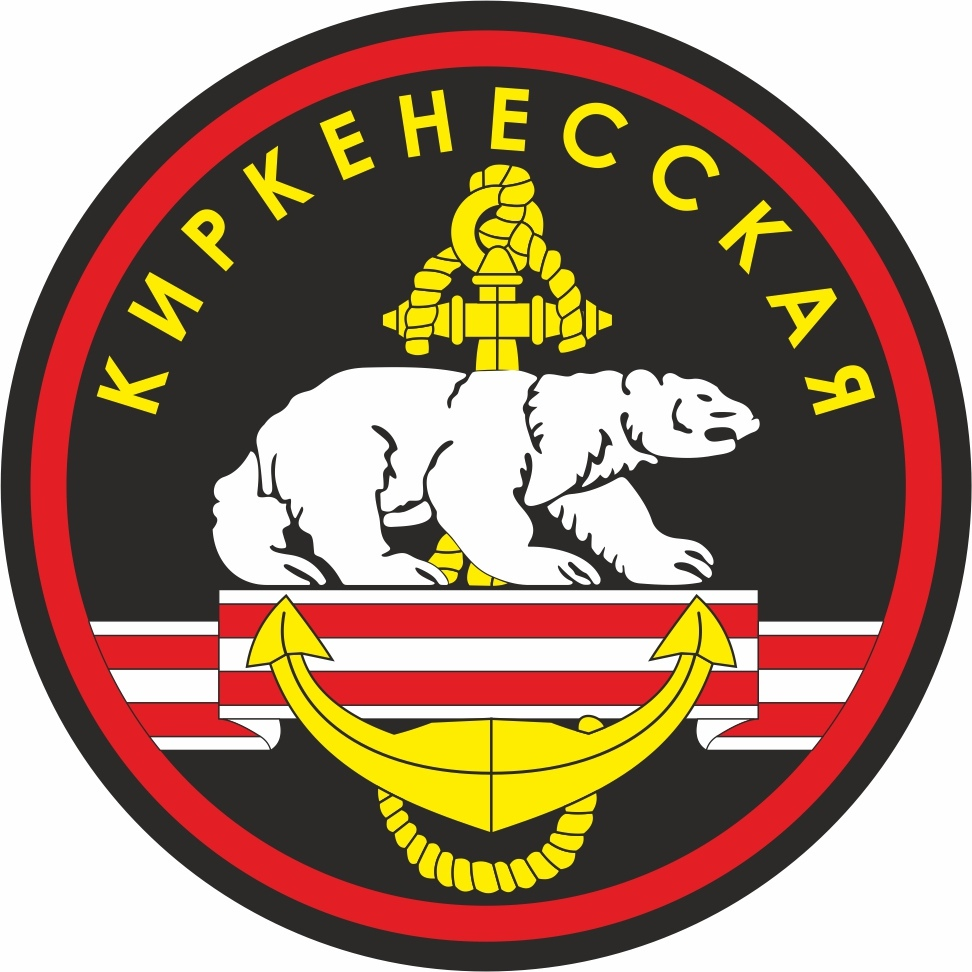
- Unofficial sleeve patch

The 61st Separate Guards Kirkenes Order of the Red Banner Naval Infantry Brigade (Russian: 61-я отдельная гвардейская Киркенесская Краснознаменная бригада морской пехоты; Military Unit Number 38643) is a formation of the Russian Naval Infantry. It is part of the Northern Fleet Naval Infantry and Coastal Defence Force. The brigade is based in the Sputnik military settlement, located in Murmansk Oblast. Some sources considered it one of the best trained and most combat experienced units of the Russian military.

== History ==
Elements of 61st Naval Infantry Brigade conducted amphibious landings from the Ropucha-class landing ship Kondopoga on 24 September 2020.

The brigade was established on 20 November 1979 from the 61st Separate Naval Infantry Regiment. The regiment was activated at Sputnik on 14 May 1966 from the 61st Motor Rifle Regiment of the 131st Motor Rifle Division.

Soldiers of the 61st Naval Infantry Brigade fought in 1995 in First and in 1999–2000 in the Second Chechen War. On 1 December 2009, the brigade was downsized to a regiment with the same designation. It became a brigade again on 15 December 2014.

In 2014, according to an investigation published by Bellingcat, marines of the 61st Naval Infantry Brigade participated in the War in Donbas in the Luhansk region of Ukraine. Brigade personnel and vehicles, including the brigade's exotic 2S23 Nona-SVK, were spotted on the territory of the Ukrainian National Guard's military base (MUN 3035) in Luhansk. Evidences shows the brigade's direct participation in combat near Vishnevy Dol village in the Luhansk region.

Upon returning home, the marines took a trophy BRDM armored vehicle back to Murmansk. At least 5 soldiers received decorations, which included the Zhukov Medal, the Order of Suvorov and the Order of Courage. Brigade Lieutenant Colonel Vitaly Trofimov was reportedly killed in Ukraine.

In March 2016, the 61st Naval Infantry Brigade conducted operations in which it aided the Syrian Army taking the Syrian city of Palmyra. The 61st also participated in the storming of the city. Despite other Russian forces being more available for the operation, the 61st Brigade was chosen for the operation because it was considered one of the best trained and most combat experienced units of the Russian military.

As of February 2022, elements of the Brigade were reported to have deployed to the Black Sea as part of an amphibious task force participating in the invasion of Ukraine. On 7 March the Ukrainian military claimed to have killed Lieutenant Colonel Dmitry Safronov, commander of the brigade's Marine Battalion, in action near Kharkiv.

On 25 January 2024 the brigade received the "Guards" title.

As of September 2025, elements of the brigade were reported operating in Dobropillya tactical area in eastern Ukraine. The brigade had previously been reported operating in the area of Kherson.

== Organisation and order of battle ==
- Brigade Headquarters
- 874th Marine Battalion
- 876th Air-Assault (Desant) Battalion
- 886th Reconnaissance Battalion
- 125th Armored Battalion
- 1611th Self-propelled Artillery Battalion
- 1591st Self-propelled Artillery Battalion
- 1617th Anti-aircraft Missile and Artillery Battalion

== Commanders ==
The following officers commanded this unit:

Commanders of the 61st Infantry Regiment:

- Y. P. Pidust: 1944–1948;
- I. S. Matveev: 1948–1950;
- A. P. Vorobyov: 1950–1952;
- M. P. Davydov: 1952–1954;
- P. S. Lopatkin: 1954–1955;
- V. G. Solovyov: 1955–1956;
- B.C. Zatoka: 1956–1957.

Commanders of the 61st Motor Rifle Regiment:

- M. I. Belov: 1957–1959;
- V. I. Varennikov: 1959–1960;
- A. A. Fomichev: 1960–1965.

Commanders of the 61st Marine Regiment:

- V. A. Krukovsky: 1965–1967;
- A. F. Pakhomov: 1967–1974;
- N. B. Polyakov: 1974–1979;

Commanders of the 61st Marine Brigade:

- A. E. Ermakov: 1979–1984;
- A. S. Pustoutov: 1984–1988;
- A. N. Borzenko: 1988–1990;
- Y. M. Shakalov: 1990–1993;
- B. F. Sokushev: 1993–1995;
- G. S. Semyonov: 1995–1999;
- A. V. Chernov: 1999–2002;
- N. I. Klimov: 2002–2005;
- A. V. Sorogin: 2005–2008;
- M. K. Magomedzhanov: 2008–2010.

Commander of the 61st Marine Regiment:

- A. V. Maslov: 2010–2014

Commanders of the 61st Marine Brigade:

- A. V. Maslov: 2014–2016
- V. V. Fedyanin†: 2016–30.09.2017 (died of wound in Syria)
- K. N. Nikulin: 2018–present
