= Battle of the Shaer gas field (2016) =

2016 battle

Coordinates: 34.5542°N 38.2833°E

- Part of the Syrian Civil War
Date	2–30 May 2016 (4 weeks)
Location	Palmyra region, Homs Governorate, Syria
Result	ISIL victory

Belligerents
Islamic State of Iraq and the Levant	(Syria) Syrian Arab Republic; Supported by: Russia

Commanders and leaders
Abu Baraa Al Jazrawi	(Syria) Unknown

Units involved
Unknown	(Syria) Unknown Syrian military unit (Russia) Russian Naval Infantry

Casualties and losses
16 killed (1st day)	(Syria) 425+ killed (per SOHR)

The Battle of the Shaer gas field took place between the Islamic State of Iraq and the Levant (ISIL) and the Syrian government for the control over the Shaer gas field (Sha'er gas field) during the Syrian Civil War. It is the third attack that was launched by ISIL on the gas field.

== Offensive ==
On 5 May 2016, ISIL once again captured the Shaer gas field that had been held by the Syrian government since the Second Battle of the Shaer gas field. 34 soldiers and 16 ISIL fighters were killed during the battle for the field.

Four days later, ISIL attacked the nearby al-Mahr oil field, capturing al-Mahr hill, before the military recaptured the hill and repelled the attack on the field the following day. The same day, 10 May, ISIL captured an abandoned military base near the T4 airbase, cutting the main supply route to Palmyra. Government troops recaptured the base and reopened the supply road.

Mid-May, there were reports of explosions and a 4.4 Richter magnitude scale earthquake that was believed to be caused by the entire field blowing up.

On 30 May, government forces recaptured the Huwaysis area.

== Aftermath ==
In late June, ISIL was once again in control of the Huwaysis area.

In early July, some media activists showed the first photos and videos of the preparation of blasting and explosion.

In September, pro-government forces regained control of the Huwaysis area. but lost it again in a December offensive before recapturing it yet again in early 2017.

== See also ==
- Battle of the Shaer gas field (July 2014)
- Battle of the Shaer gas field (October–November 2014)
