= Hind al Shaer =

Jordanian writer and researchers

Hind Abu Shaer
- Born: 20th century, Ajloun
- Education: Jordanian University
- Occupation: writer

Hind Ghassan Tawfiq Abu al-Shaer, a Jordanian writer and researcher with many works. Born in Ajloun in northern Jordan, she worked in several public schools and finished her master in 1994, where she completed her work at universities that started at the University of Jordan and then university to the house, she has chaired the editing of a few print literary periodicals. She presented a documentary radio program on Jordanian radio entitled "Jordanian Papers" for three sessions (2005-2011).

== Education ==
al-Shaer finished high school at Irbid Girls High School, then studied history at the University of Jordan, obtaining a bachelor's degree, a master's degree (1983), and a doctorate(1994) .

== Career ==
She worked in the department of secondary schools at the Ministry of Education, then moved to teach at Al-Bayt University since its founding in 1994, during which time she served as deputy editor-in-chief of the university's shura newspaper (1994-1998) and president of the department of history (2003/04), dean of the faculty of arts and sciences (2004/05), and dean of the faculty of arts and humanities (2005-2007).

She moved to the University of Jordan as director of her library and publishing house (2007-2009), before returning to work teaching history at Al-Bayt University since 2009. She is the editor-in-chief of the university's al-Bayan magazine. She served as a board of trustees at the Zaytouna University of Jordan (2002-2006).

=== Publishing and writing ===
She wrote a weekly column in the daily Al-Dustour for a year, then moved to the daily Al-Rai to write a weekly column (1988-1998), as she wrote for a limited time in the daily "Voice of the People" at the time of its publication. She has a weekly column in al-Dustour entitled "With Life and People" and a weekly corner in al-Rai entitled "Ancestral Papers".

== Membership ==
- She has been a member of the editorial board of the Ministry of Culture's "Ideas" magazine since September 2011 and has been a member of the magazine's advisory board for two times (1984/85 and 2011).
- Member of the Committee for the Publications of "Jerusalem as the Capital of Arab Culture 2009" formed by the Jordanian Ministry of Culture.
- A member of the High Committee for the Celebration of Zarqa, The City of Culture of Jordan in 2010, chaired the committee of publications of this committee
- Membership of the National Documentation Committee of the Ministry of Culture (2009/2010) to document Jordan's history.
- She is a member of the "Encyclopedia of Oman", which is supervised by the Cultural Department of the Greater Amman Municipality and was a member of the Study Evaluation Committee of the Municipality's Cultural Department (2005/06 and 2008/09).
- Member of the Board of Trustees of the Nazzal Al-Armouti Award organized by the Municipality in 2008.
- She headed the Study and Research Team of the Samarkand Museum (1997-2001).
- Member of the Board of Directors of The Jordanian News Agency Petra since September 2007.
- Member of: Committee for the Issuance of the Hashemite Document Series (1994-2001), The High Committee for the Preservation of the Arabic Language (2007) and the Preparatory Committee for both the Fourth and Fifth Cultural Conferences at the University of Jordan (2008 and 2009), the Documents and Manuscripts Centre of the University of Jordan, the Committee for the Preparation of Materials of the Museum of The History of Jordan and the Advisory Committee of the Department of Publications (2009/2010).
- She is a member of the Jordanian Writers Society and was selected for a term as a member of the Administrative Committee of its Branch in Zarqa. She is also a member of the Arab Thought Forum in Amman.
- She co-founded the Group of Young Artists in 1981 and participated in the group's annual exhibitions in Amman, Zarqa, Yarmouk University in Irbid and Damascus (1981-1988).

== Awards ==
- UNESCO Silver Award for "Memory of the Homeland" episodes, published successively in al-Rai newspaper (1999/2000),
- The "Best Book of 2002" award from the University of Philadelphia in 2003 for her book East Jordan in the Ottoman era.

== Her works ==
=== Stories and literature ===
Hind Abu al-Sha'er was closely associated with the art of short story, issuing several collections of stories, including Cracks in the Palm of Khadra, her first collection of stories published in 1981, which represented her first beginnings, so her writing of the familiar story came far from experimentation, and then a collection of stories entitled Confrontation was published in 1984. Then the horse group in 1991, then a group when memory became home in 1996 and the three groups were distinguished by the use of the symbol style thief, but in the tattoo collection issued in 2000, the writer is interested in the world of childhood.

- Cracks in The Palm of Khadra, Stories, Jordanian Writers Society, Amman, 1982, i2, Ministry of Culture, 2008.
- Confrontation, Stories, D.N., Zahra Press, Amman, 1984.
- Horse, Stories, Jordanian Writers Society, Amman, 1990.
- When memory becomes a homeland, stories, Ministry of Culture, Oman, 1996.
- Tattoos, Stories, Greater Amman Municipality, Amman, 2000.
- Full works (poetry, short story, texts, theatrical scenes), NCB and Jordan's Dar Ward, Amman, 2006.
- Military marches.

=== Other topics ===
It has many works, particularly in documentation, social history and the history of eastern Jordan during the Ottoman period, including:

- Mukhtar bin Abi Obeid al-Taqfi movement in Kufa, Dean of Scientific Research, University of Jordan, Amman, 1983.
- Irbid and its vicinity. Bani Obeid District, 1850-1928, Al-Bayt University and Business Bank, Mafraq, 1995.
- History of Eastern Jordan in the Ottoman Period 1516-1918, Al-Bayt Foundation, Amman, 2001.
- Land Records in Jordan 1876-1960, Al-Bayt University, Mafraq.
