= Telnyashka =

Distinctively striped undershirt, part of uniform of Russian forces

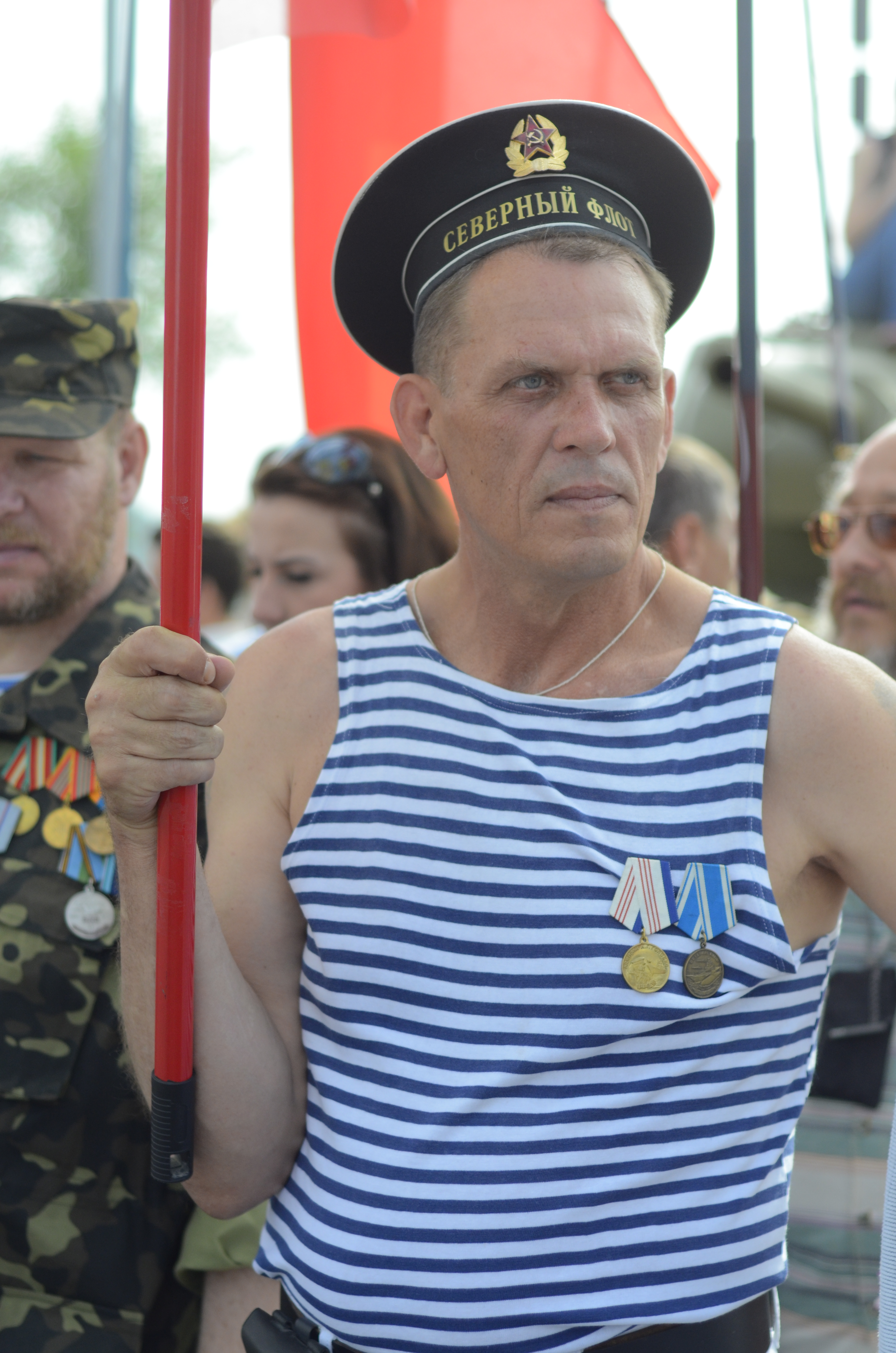
- A man wears a blue-white sleeveless telnyashka at the 2012 Victory Day celebration in Donetsk.
- Type: Undershirt
- Place of origin: Russia

A telnyashka (Russian: тельняшка, pronounced [tʲɪlʲˈnʲaʂkə]) or telnik (тельник) is a type of undershirt worn with military uniforms of the Russian Armed Forces. They traditionally feature blue and white horizontal stripes, and can come in varying thicknesses and may be sleeved or sleeveless. Other variations of telnyashka with different colour schemes have been adopted based on a unit's affiliation.

Telnyashkas originated in the Imperial Russian Navy and spread from the Soviet Navy to the other branches of the Soviet Armed Forces. They have become a cultural icon of both Russia and the Soviet Union, especially their militaries, and are widely featured in popular culture.

== Technical details ==
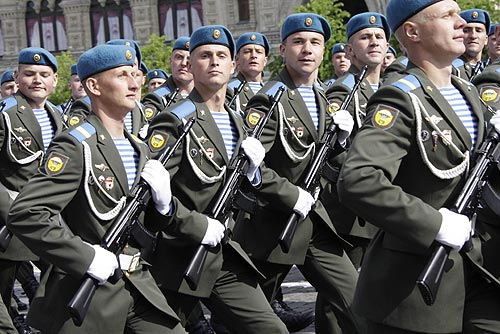
Russian Airborne Forces soldiers wear telnyashkas on parade.

The uniforms of Russia's Naval, Airborne and Naval Infantry personnel do not include conventional collared shirts. Open-fronted jackets of various designs make the distinctively striped telnyashka a conspicuous part of the clothing of branches of the Russian armed forces.

Telnyashkas are also available to civilian customers and may come in a variety of knittings. Single-stranded knitting is the standard military-issue variant, but double- and quadruple-stranded knitting for increased warmth can be produced. A quadruple-stranded telnyashka is thick enough to keep the wearer warm with nothing else on, even at 5 °C (41 °F), as it was originally developed to be worn by military divers under a dry suit.

== History ==
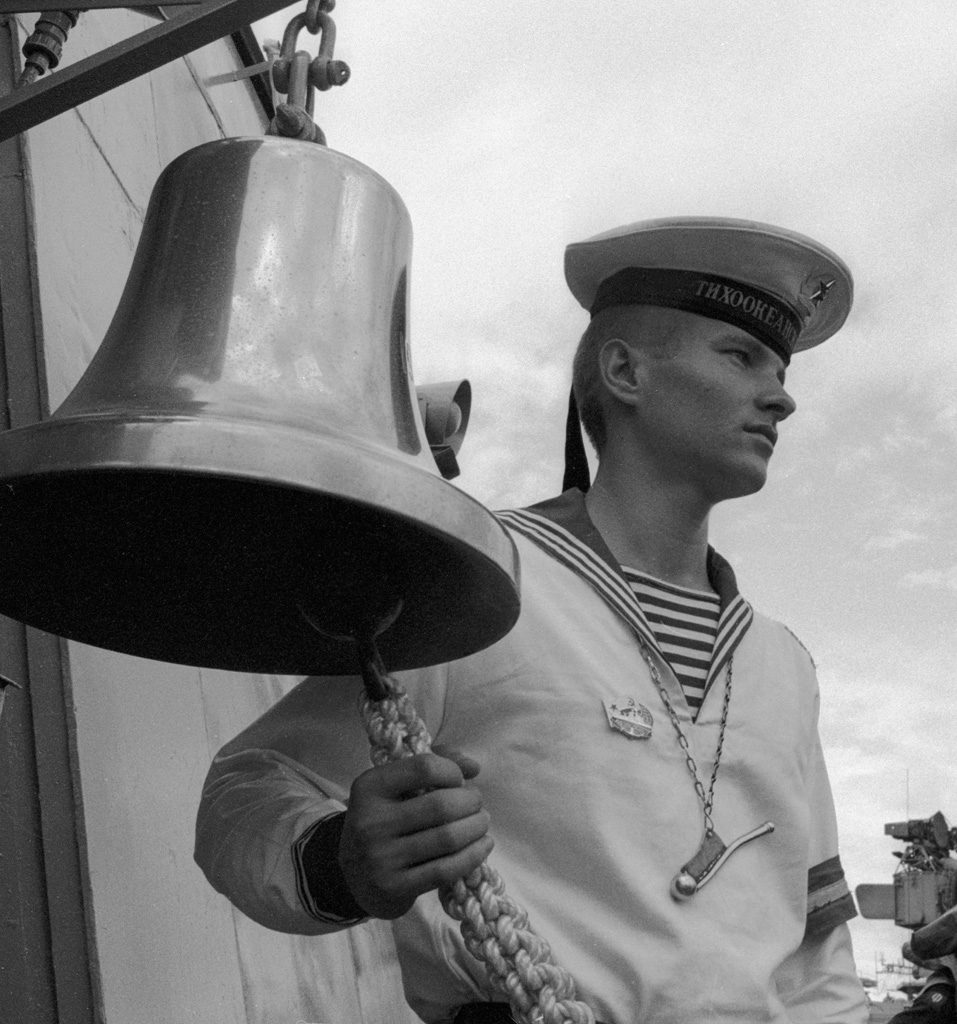
Soviet Pacific Fleet sailor in full dress, including a dark-blue telnyashka.

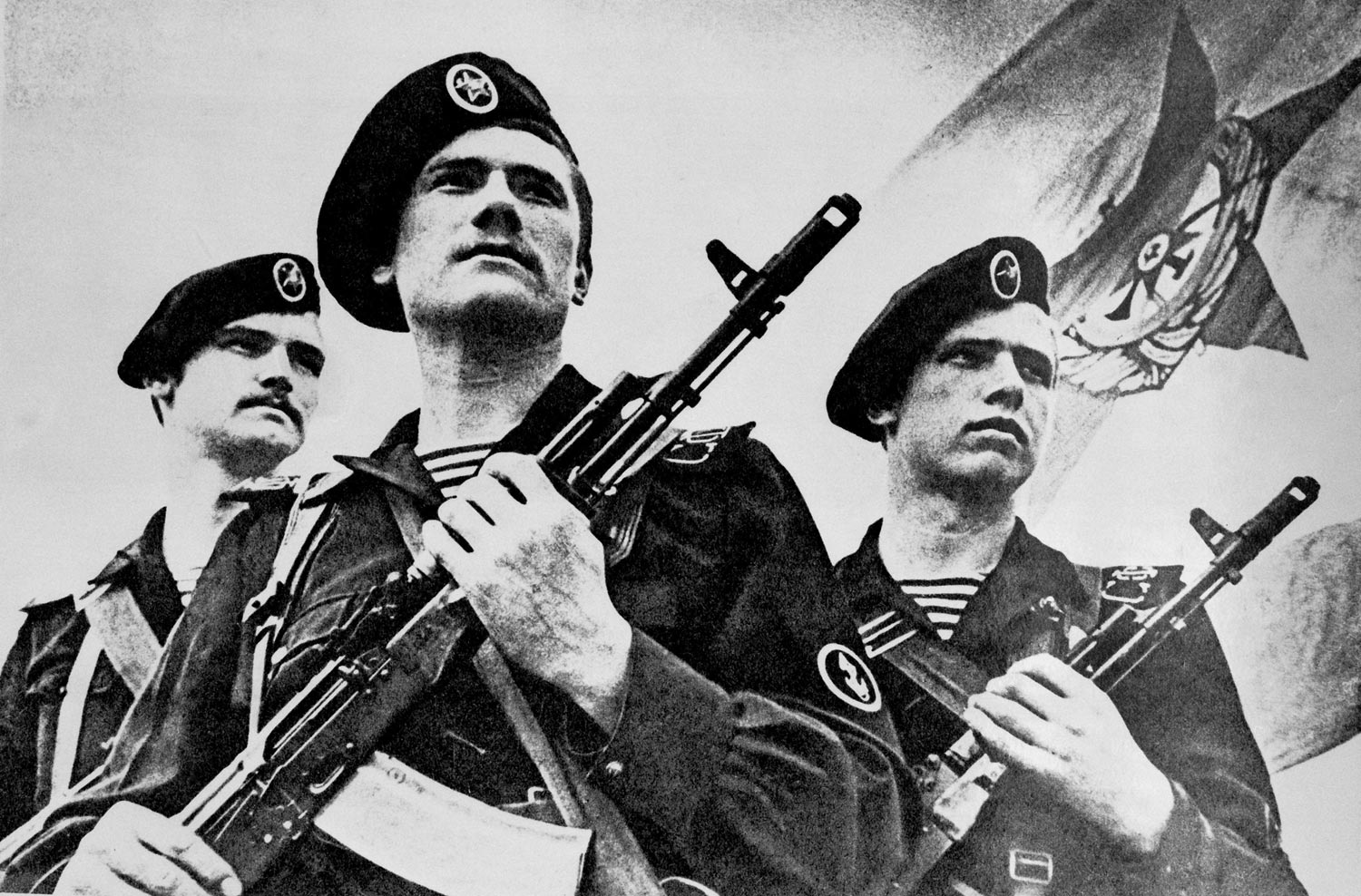
Soviet Naval Infantry wearing telnyashkas in the mid-1980s.

The Russian telnyashka originated in the distinctive striped marinière blouse worn by merchant sailors and fishermen of Brittany, who adopted this style to distinguish them from other sea-going nationalities. The fashion was later adopted and popularized by the French Navy and other navies of the pre-dreadnought era. Sailors of the modern French Navy still wear these garments in certain orders of dress.

The Imperial Russian Navy adopted the blue and white striped telnyashka blouse during the 19th century. The tradition of Russian or Soviet ground troops wearing a naval uniform comes from Soviet Navy sailors who fought as shore units during World War II. It is exemplified by the famed Soviet sniper Vassili Zaitsev, a petty officer in the Soviet Pacific Fleet who volunteered for army duty, but refused to give up his telnyashka because of the pride it engendered.

Vasily Margelov, who was later to modernize the Soviet Airborne Forces (VDV), had previously served with a Naval Infantry unit in World War II, and procured telnyashkas for the VDV as a mark of their elite status.

== Use in the Russian military ==
Although the blue and white striped telnyashka is the best-known, other colors are in use. The colored telnyashka stripes usually match the beret, except for the Marines, who have a blue striped shirt and black beret.

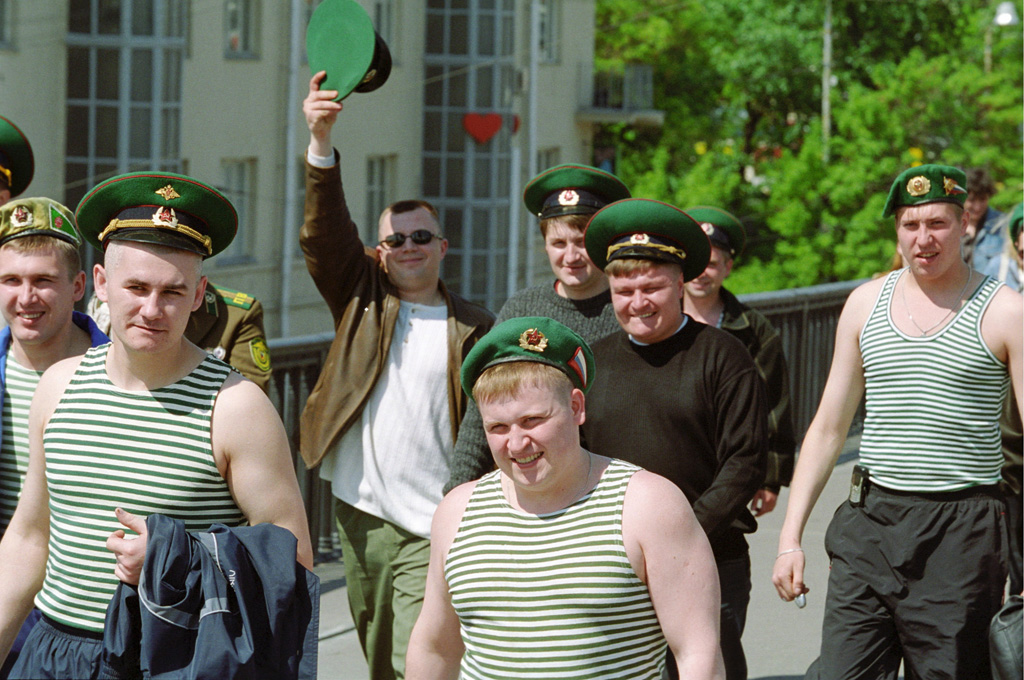
Former servicemen of the Border Guard Service wearing green and white telnyashkas during a celebration.

=== Blue and white stripes ===
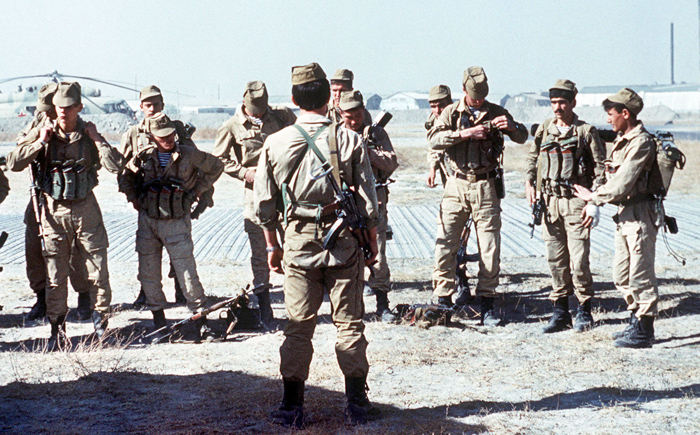
Soviet Spetsnaz wearing telnyashkas with Afghanka battle dress during the Soviet–Afghan War in the 1980s.

- Russian Navy: The telnyashka was first worn by the 19th century Imperial Russian Navy and has been worn by Russian sailors ever since.
  - Russian marines, PDSS and submarine crewmen: As branches of the Navy they wear the blue and white telnyashka with their dress uniform, but in the field they use a black and white striped variant.
  - The maritime service of the Border Troops follows the traditions of the Navy, including its ranks and the telnyashka.
- Russian Airborne Troops (VDV). Introduced by General Vasily Margelov. to the displeasure of Admiral Sergey Gorshkov.
  - GRU Spetsnaz: Military intelligence special forces often wear VDV uniforms including the blue telnyashka.
  - KGB Border Troops airborne units use VDV insignia and uniform
- Federal Security Service spetsnaz units and the Kremlin Regiment of the Federal Protective Service wear cornflower blue telnyashkas as part of their uniform.
- KGB and FSB officers in military counter-intelligence roles wear the same color as that of the unit that they are assigned to.

=== Green and white stripes ===
- Border Service of the Federal Security Service of the Russian Federation follow the traditions of their Soviet predecessor and wear the green telnyashka (except for its maritime and airborne units). Green is also used by the Border Troops of Belarus.

=== Red and white stripes ===
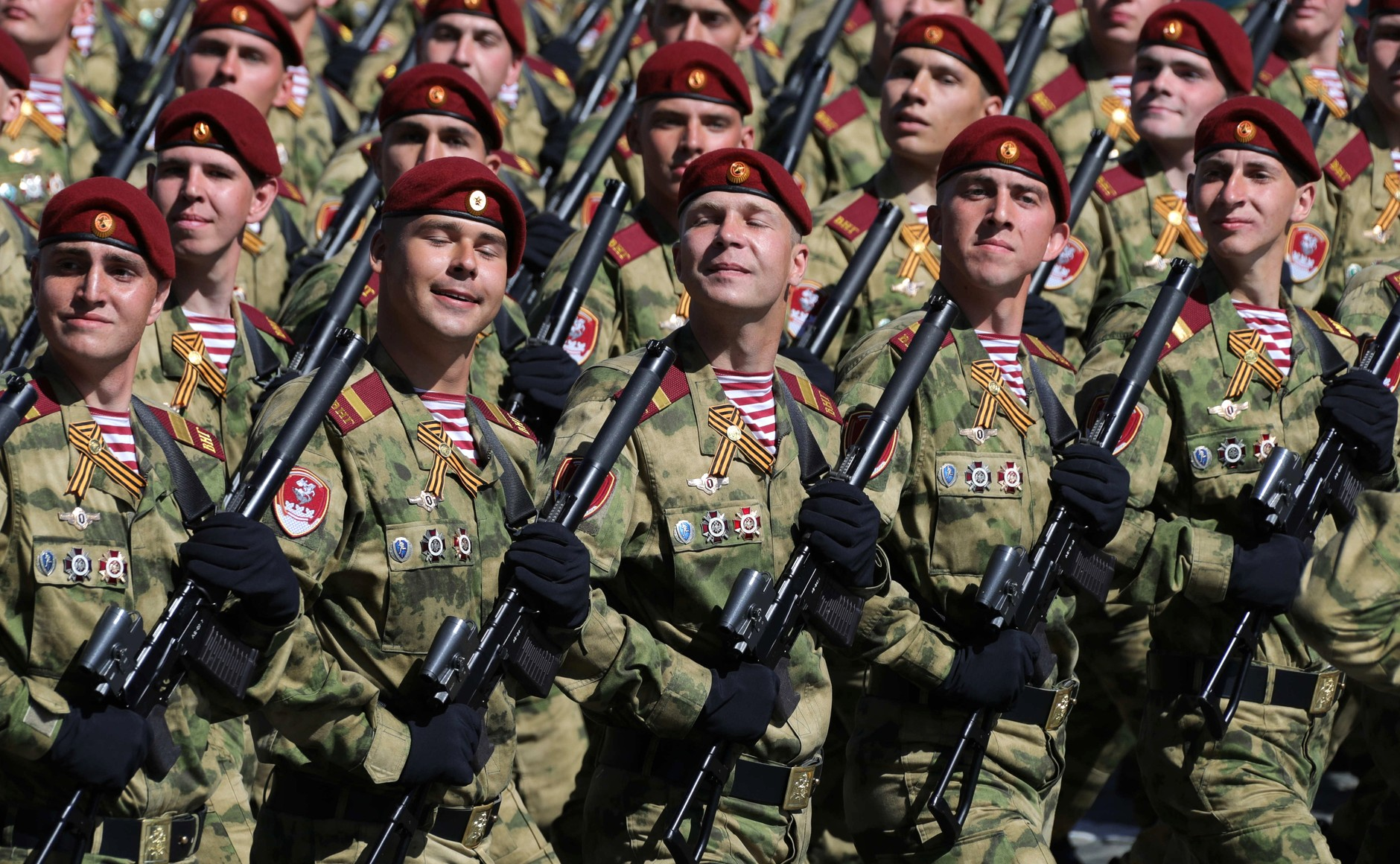
National Guard of Russia guardsmen wearing red and white telnyashkas.

- The National Guard of Russia (Rosgvardiya) wear dark red and white striped telnyashkas with dark red berets, as did its predecessor, the Interior Troops.

=== Orange and white stripes ===
The Russian Ministry of Emergency Situations wears an orange and white striped telnyashka, introduced by Sergei Shoigu when he was its Minister. The Ministry is mostly in charge of civil defence and firefighters and uses army-style ranks.

== In popular culture ==
The telnyashka is worn by a number of popular non-military characters of cinema and children's cartoons, notably The Wolf in Nu, pogodi and Matroskin the Cat in Troe iz Prostokvashino.

Telnyashkas serve as part of the "image" and the attire of the art group Mitki.

There is a popular saying: "We are few in number, but we are in telnyashkas!" (Russian: Нас мало, но мы в тельняшках!, romanized: Nas malo, no my v telnyashkakh!), alluding to the reputation of troops who wear the shirt as ferocious warriors.

== See also ==
- Sailor suit
