= Najami Ghani Shaer =

Najami Ghani Shaer نجمي غني شاعر
- Village
- Country: Iran
- Province: South Khorasan
- County: Nehbandan
- Bakhsh: Central
- Rural District: Bandan

Population (2006)
  - Total: 86
- Time zone: UTC+3:30 (IRST)
  - Summer (DST): UTC+4:30 (IRDT)

Najami Ghani Shaer (Persian: نجمي غني شاعر, also Romanized as Najamī Ghanī Shāʿer) is a village in Bandan Rural District, in the Central District of Nehbandan County, South Khorasan Province, Iran. At the 2006 census, its population was 86, in 18 families.
