= Jamal Al Shaer =

Egyptian activist and author

Jamal Al Shear
- Born: 1956 (age 69–70); Dikirnis
- Education: Bachelor of Commerce in Business

Jamal El-Shaer (Arabic: جمال الشاعر ) (1956), Egyptian activist and author, born in Dikirnis, Dakahlia governorate, received his Bachelor of Commerce in the Department of Business year 1978, then studied media and worked as a broadcaster in (Arab Voice) (Sout Al Arab) between (1980-1983). Next, a TV presenter since 1983. He also worked as head of youth section in Channel One on Egyptian TV. He has been a member of the scripting committee of the radio and television since 1983, and published his poems in magazines and periodicals such as (The Pyramids) (Al-Ahram), (Radio), (The Middle East)(Al- Sharq Al-Awsat), and (The Arabic Magazine) (Al Majallah Al Arabiya). He got the title of the best TV broadcaster in1991. Jamal was also a member of the Literary and the Linguistic Studies Committee of the Supreme Council of Culture.

== Publications ==
- A politician remembering his politic work experience, Riyadh Al-Rais Books and Publishing, 1987, pages:363 (original title: Seyasi Yatathakar, Tajroba fee Al Amal AlSeyasi)
- Clap or not to Clap, 1987.(original title: Safeq aw la tosafeq)
- Laughs and Started Fires, 1996. (original title: Thahekat fa Ashalat Al Harae'q)
- Slaves Eating Pizza, pages:78 (original title: Al Mamaleek Ya'akolon Pizza)
- Reserve a Seat in Heaven, The Egyptian Lebanese House, 2008, pages:159. (original title: Ehjez Maqa'adoka fee Al jannah)
- So What, The Egyptian Lebanese House, 2008, pages:143. (original title: Katha Matha)
- My Dear.. Einstein doesn't bite, The Egyptian Lebanese House, 2008, pages:152. (original title: Habebti Einstein la Ya'ath)
- ...Th?!, The Egyptian Lebanese House, 2011. (original title: Eieh? )
- Act like a Fool, The Egyptian Lebanese House, 2012, pages:175. (original title: Ema'al Abeet)
- A politician remembering his politic work experience>>, 2015, pages:370. (original title: Seyasi Yatathakar Tajroba fee Al Amal AlSeyasi)
