= Al al-Bayt University =

Public university in Jordan

Coordinates: 32.361°N 36.219°E

- جامعة آل البيت
- Official logo of the University
- Type: Public
- Established: 1993
- Affiliations: IAU, FUIW, AARU
- Chairman: Ali Mahafzah
- President: Hani Al-Dmour
- Undergraduates: 16720 (2015)
- Postgraduates: 1213 (2015)
- Location: Mafraq, Jordan
- Campus: Urban 7.539 square kilometers
- Colors: Green and White ^{[a]}
- Website: www.aabu.edu.jo

Al al-Bayt University (often abbreviated AABU) is a public university in Jordan. It is located on the outskirts of the city of Mafraq, 65 Kilometers to the north-east of the capital Amman. The university has integrated academic facilities, student housing, and social services on one site, extending over an area of 7.539 square kilometers. The university ranks among the top ten universities in the Kingdom.

== History ==
On August 17, 1992, a Royal Decree was issued ordaining the establishment of Al al-Bayt University. Royal Message stated that the university was to meet an urgent need for a new kind of university, combining the requirements of scientific methodology in teaching and research with the requirements of Muslim belief and clarity of vision on the other.

On December 16, 1992, another Royal Decree was issued approving the formation of Al al-Bayt Special Royal Committee, under the chairmanship of Crown Prince Hassan, and the membership of selected high-standing scholars and intellectuals from Jordan and other parts of the Islamic world. The main task of this committee was to lay the foundation of the university, and to submit its decisions on operational and administrative issues to the King for his final approval or decision. The Royal Decree pertaining to the appointment of the first President of Al al-Bayt University was issued on May 22, 1993. Immediately thereafter, a number of administrative, academic and technical committees were set up to carry out the mission of establishing the university, each in accordance to its assigned responsibilities.

After completing its infrastructure, recruiting faculty members, and defining its courses and programs, the university was ready to receive its first group of students on October 1, 1994. Under the patronage of King Hussein, and in the presence of Crown Prince Hassan, Al al-Bayt University was officially inaugurated on March 6, 1995 (6 Ramadan 1415 H).

== Academics ==
The university has nine faculties; each one branches out into multiple departments. The faculties are:

- Prince Hussein bin Abdullah Faculty of Information Technology
- Faculty of Finance and Business Administration
- Princess Salma Faculty of Nursing
- Faculty of Sharia
- Faculty of Law
- Faculty of Foreign Languages
- Faculty of Arts and Humanities
- Faculty of Engineering
- Faculty of Science
- Faculty of Educational Sciences
- Faculty of Earth and Environmental Sciences

The university also services other institutions:

- Bayt Al-Hekmah
- The Institute of Astronomy & Space Sciences
- Higher Institute of Islamic Studies

In 2014, the university diversified its Faculty of Arts and Humanities, including more majors in Italian, Spanish, French, English, in addition to Arabic. Two master's degrees in English Language have also been introduced: one in Literature and Criticism and the other in Linguistics.

According to a fact sheet issued by the university, as of 2015, Al al-Bayt ran 35 undergrad programs, 33 MA programs, and 2 PhD programs.

== Journals ==
The two most prominent journals published by the university are

- Jordan Journal of Islamic Studies
- Al-Manarah Journal

== See also ==
- List of Islamic educational institutions
