= Sputnik, Murmansk Oblast =

Sputnik Спутник
- Posyolok
- Interactive map of Sputnik
- Location of Sputnik Sputnik (Murmansk Oblast)
- Coordinates: 69°30′30″N 31°18′2″E
- Country: Russia
- Federal subject: Murmansk Oblast
- Administrative district: Pechengsky District

Population (2010 Census)
  - Total: 2,061
  - Estimate (2021): 1,597 (−22.5%)
- Time zone: UTC+3 (MSK)
- Postal code: 184411
- Dialing code: +7 81554
- OKTMO ID: 47615162121

Sputnik (Russian: Спутник) is the rural locality (a Posyolok) in Pechengsky District of Murmansk Oblast, Russia. The village is located beyond the Arctic Circle, located at a height of 83 m above sea level.
