= First Battle of Sha'ir =

Battle of the Syrian civil war, in 2014

Coordinates: 34.5542°N 38.2833°E

Battle of the Shaer gas field (July 2014)
- Part of the Syrian Civil War
Date	16–26 July 2014 (1 week and 3 days)
Location	Palmyra region, Homs Governorate, Syria
Result	Syrian victory
Territorial changes	Syrian government forces recapture the gas field

Belligerents
Islamic State	(Syria) Syrian Arab Republic

Commanders and leaders
Hassan Abbous (IS emir of Homs)	Unknown

Units involved
ISIL military; Dawoud Brigade	Syrian Armed Forces; Syrian Army; Army Special Forces; National Defense Force; Local NDF militia

Strength
100 (per ISIL); 2,000 (per SAA)	370 (gas field garrison); Unknown number of reinforcements

Casualties and losses
51–67 killed	347–361 killed (200 executed)^{[*]} 200–250 captured/missing (mostly civilian workers); 15 tanks captured several tanks and APCs destroyed
- ^{*} 11 civilian workers

The Battle of the Shaer gas field occurred in mid-July 2014 during the Syrian Civil War when jihadists of the Islamic State of Iraq and the Levant (ISIS) attacked and captured the Shaer gas field from government forces, which was followed by an Army counter-attack. It was one of the deadliest battles up-to-date in the war between fighters of the militant group and government troops.

== Battle ==
On the evening of 16 July 2014, ISIS gathered a small force of 100 veteran militants equipped with small arms and pick-up trucks and launched an assault on the Shaer field, located in the desert region of Palmyra in Homs province. The field was defended by about 400 SAA troops and NDF militia, equipped with tanks and artillery and backed up by on-call air support from the nearby Shayrat Airbase. The attack started with a suicide bombing via VBIED, followed by assaults on Army checkpoints. After 12 hours of fighting, the militants captured all eight military checkpoints and secured the gas field. A total of 363 SAA troops and NDF militiamen present at the start of the attack were killed, wounded, or captured, with only 30 managing to escape to the nearby Hajjar field. Days later, it was reported that some of the military officers committed betrayal at the start of the attack. After the raid, ISIS posted online a video purportedly showing two rocket launchers and two tanks that they captured and the bodies of 50 people lying in an open desert space, many apparently executed.

It was determined 270 people on the government side, including 11 civilian workers, were killed, with at least 200 of them executed after being captured. Another 200–250 government fighters and workers remained captured or missing, while 21–27 ISIS militants were killed. Government supporters branded the killings of the POWs as a "massacre" and the pro-opposition Syrian Observatory for Human Rights condemned the killings with the SOHR director stating: "The Observatory condemns summary execution as a war crime, regardless of which side it is committed by in the Syrian conflict. Summary execution is a war crime — whether of civilians or combatants. They are prisoners of war and must not be executed."

Soon after, the military launched an attempt to recapture the gas field, which included air strikes. The next day, Syrian special forces joined the battle as government troops recaptured parts of the Shaer field. 11–20 soldiers and 30–40 ISIS fighters were killed during the day's clashes.

On 19 July, government aircraft withdrew from the field due to heavy militant fire from 23-mm heavy machine guns, while the fighting settled into hit-and-run attacks after government forces managed to recapture large areas of the gas field but were still trying to take control of the surrounding areas. Later, it was reported 60–65 soldiers were killed during the day, ether by friendly fire airstrikes or in fighting against ISIS.

On 20 July, government forces pushed ISIS out of the gas field and secured it, while fighting continued on its outskirts. According to another source, the Islamic State was still in control of the gas field, despite efforts of the Army. The next day, new government reinforcements arrived at Tiyas airbase, east of Homs city, while more fighting left six soldiers dead.

On 26 July, the Army secured the gas field, as well as the surrounding hills. The capture of the field came after ISIS forces retreated. According to the military, this was achieved due to a "precise operation in which dozens of terrorists were killed." The ISIS itself claimed they retreated after destroying the field's equipment and capturing at least 15 tanks and dozens of rockets which were used to guard the field, thus achieving their goal. An ISIS spokesman characterized the battle as a successful raid: "We pulled out because it was no longer good for us to stay. The goal was to get the tanks and rockets present at the field and we did. There is no point in staying there and becoming an easy target for the regime and its warplanes."

== Aftermath ==
In late October, ISIS once again attacked the gas field and after three days of fighting captured the field, as well as the Hayyan Gas Company. only to be lost to the SAA on 6 November, when the Army retook the Shaer gas field and Syriatel Hill from ISIL.

== See also ==
- Palmyra offensive (May 2015)
