= Shaer gas field =

Gas field in Syria

Coordinates: 34°53′46″N 37°56′42″E

The Shaer gas field (Arabic: حقل الشاعر, Al-Shaer gas field), also Sha'er, Shair, or Sha'ir gas field is a gas field in Syria,, 150km northwest of Palmyra, Homs Governorate. Its prime investor was Petro-Canada and it supplies gas to the Ebla (Note: Ebla is a local Syrian company headquartered at Damascus, with Petro-Canada being the major customer) gas plant. The field primarily produces non-associated gas, i.e., independent of oil production.

== History ==
It was the bounty in several battles during 2014-2016 of the Syrian civil war. During the Eastern Homs offensive (2017) the field was recaptured from ISIL, see "Wagner Group activities in Syria" for more details.

In September 2017 the field restarted its supply of gas to Ebla.

== See also ==
- Sha'ir or shaer, a kind of pre-Islamic Arab poet believed to have magical powers.
- Al Shaer
- Tel Shair
