= 244th Brigade =

244th Brigade may refer to:

- 244th Artillery Brigade, Russia/Soviet Union
- 244th Expeditionary Combat Aviation Brigade, United States

== See also ==
244th Regiment (disambiguation)
