= Coastal Troops of the Russian Navy =

Service arm of the Russian Navy

- Береговые войска ВМФ Российской Федерации; Beregovye voiska
- Founded: 27 March 1930
- Country: Russia
- Branch: Russian Navy
- Type: Motorized infantry Naval infantry Naval Spetsnaz
- Role: Amphibious reconnaissance Amphibious warfare Anti-aircraft warfare Armoured warfare CBRN defence Coastal defence and fortification Cold-weather warfare Combined arms Counter-battery fire Electronic warfare Forward observer Maneuver warfare Military intelligence Raiding; Reconnaissance; Special operations Urban warfare
- Size: 35,000 personnel
- Part of: Russian Navy

Commanders
- Current commander: Colonel General Gennady Anashkin

The Coastal Troops (Russian: Береговые войска, romanized: Beregovyye voyska) are a service arm of the Russian Navy. Their missions are to protect Russian fleets' forces, personnel, and seashore objects from enemy surface ships; to defend naval bases and other important facilities of the Fleets from land attacks, including amphibious and air assaults; to participate in amphibious and air assaults; to support the Russian Ground Forces in defending against airborne and amphibious assaults; and to destroy enemy surface ships, boats and amphibious transports in their operational area.

== Subordinate branches and equipment ==
The Coastal Troops of the Russian Navy include three branches:

- Coastal Defence Missile Artillery
- Motorized coastal defence troops
- Naval Infantry

Brigades and battalions are the main organizational elements of the Coastal Troops.

The Coastal Troops are mainly equipped with combined arms armaments and equipment. They are also armed with coastal missile systems (CMSs) that launch anti-ship guided missiles, stationary and mobile artillery mounts designed to destroy sea and ground targets, and other weapon systems.

== List of units ==
=== Pacific Fleet ===
Chief of the Coastal Forces - Major General Sergey Vitalyevich Pushkin

- 72nd Coastal Missile Brigade (Smolyaninovo, Primorsky Krai).
- 216th Electronic Warfare Regiment (Petropavlovsk-Kamchatsky, Kamchatka Krai)
- 55th Guards Naval Infantry Division (Vladivostok, Primorsky Krai)
  - Brigade HQ: Reconnaissance Battalion, Engineer Battalion, Logistics Battalion, Signal Company, Amphibious Company, Anti-tank Company, Nuclear, Biological and Chemical Protection Squad
  - 59th Naval Infantry Battalion
  - 47th Air Assault Battalion
  - Tank Battalion
  - 287th Artillery Divizion
  - 288th Air Defence Divizion
- 40th Naval Infantry Brigade (Petropavlovsk-Kamchatsky, Kamchatsky Krai)
  - Brigade HQ: Reconnaissance Battalion, Engineer Battalion, Logistics Battalion, Signal Company, Amphibious Company, Anti-tank Company, MLRS Divizion, Nuclear, Biological and Chemical Protection Squad
  - Naval Infantry Battalion
  - Air Assault Battalion
  - Tank Company
  - Artillery Divizion
  - Air Defence Divizion
  - Rifles Company
- 520th Coastal Missile-Artillery Brigade (Sakhalin Island, Sakhalin Oblast)
  - 1036th Coastal Missile-Artillery Divizion (Sakhalin Island, Sakhalin Oblast)
  - 830th Coastal Missile-Artillery Divizion (Sakhalin Island, Sakhalin Oblast)
  - 412th Coastal Missile-Artillery Divizion (Sakhalin Island, Sakhalin Oblast)
  - 574th Coastal Missile-Artillery Divizion (Iturup Island, Sakhalin Oblast)
  - 789th Coastal Missile-Artillery Divizion (Simushir Island, Sakhalin Oblast)
  - Kunashir Island Coastal Missile-Artillery Divizion (Kunashir Island, Sakhalin Oblast)
  - Matua Island Coastal Missile-Artillery Divizion (Matua Island, Sakhalin Oblast)
  - 97th Coastal Artillery Divizion (Iturup Island, Sakhalin Oblast)
- 140th Communications Center (Vladivostok, Primorsky Krai)
- 471st Electronic Warfare Center (Petropavlovsk-Kamchatsky, Kamchatsky Krai)
- 474th Electronic Warfare Center (Shtykovo, Primorsky Krai)
- 1532nd Anti-Aircraft Missile Regiment (Petropavlovsk-Kamchatsky, Kamchatsky Krai). Since April 2015, the regiment is armed with S-400 air defence system.

=== Black Sea Fleet ===
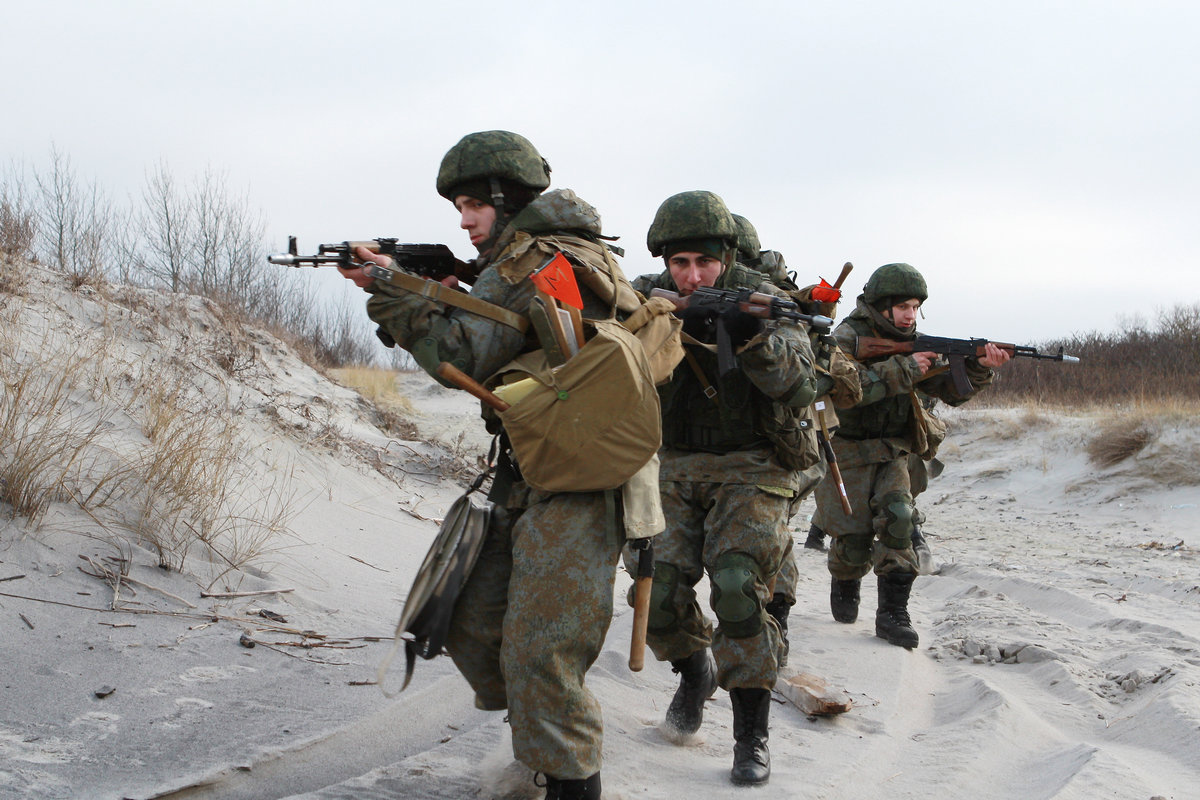
Troops of the 69th Naval Engineer Regiment of the Baltic Fleet during a training exercise in Kaliningrad, January 12, 2018

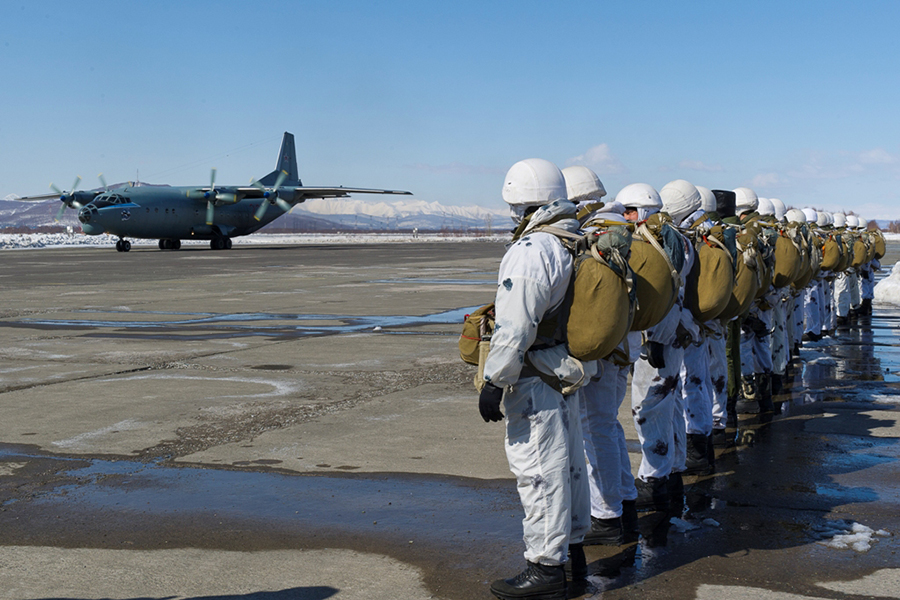
Air assault training of the 40th Naval Infantry Brigade with Antonov An-12 type aircraft, March 27, 2014

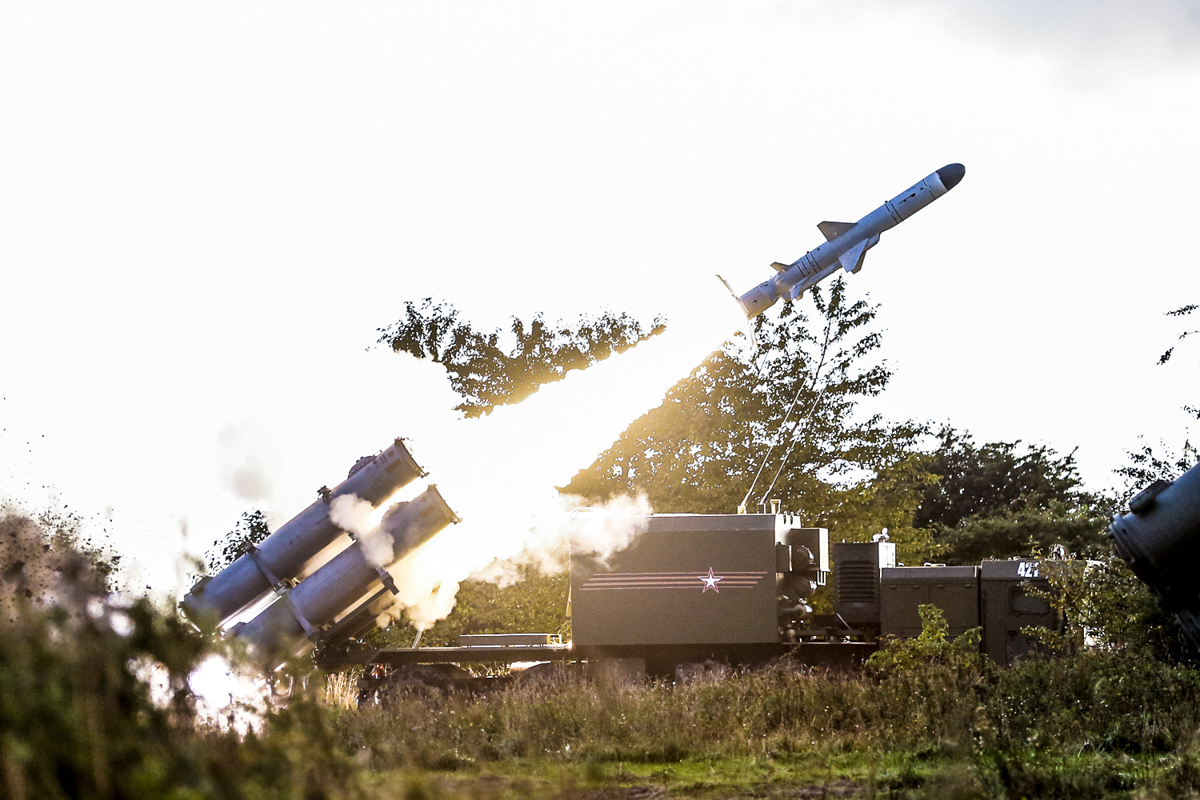
Coastal Missile troops during the 2017 Zapad exercise

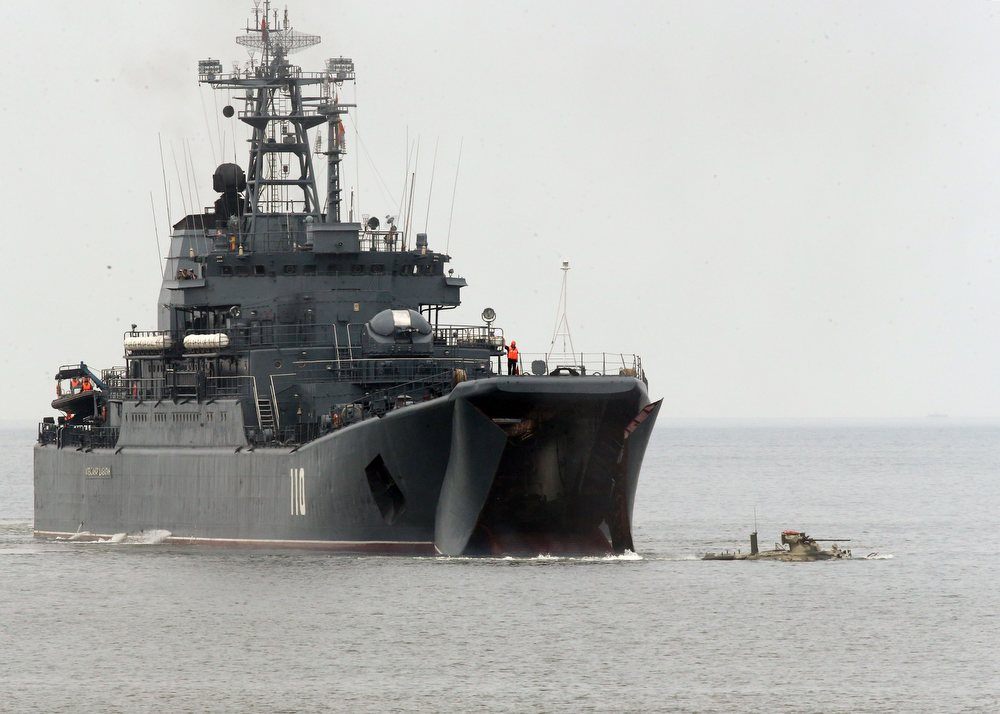
Ship supporting the operations of the 336th Guards Naval Infantry Brigade in the Baltic Sea

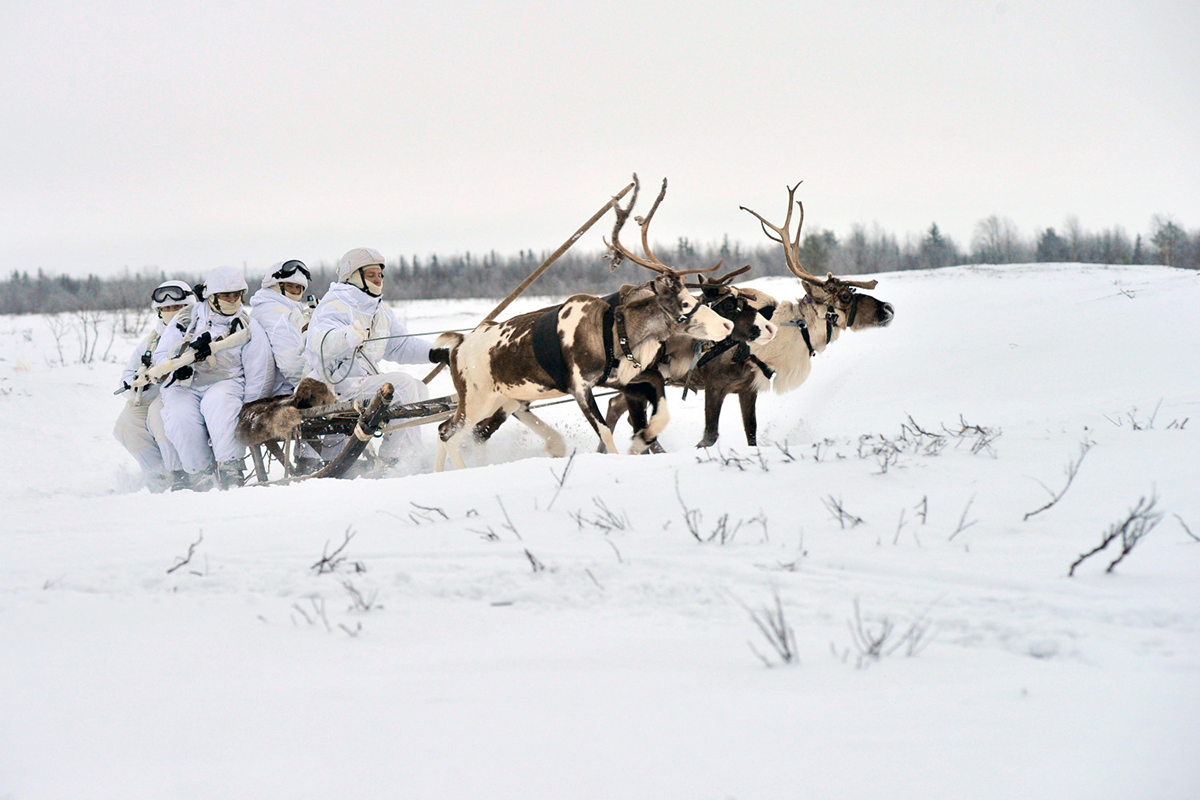
Reindeer sledding of the 80th Arctic Motor Rifle Brigade of the Northern Fleet, January 23, 2017

Chief of the Coastal Forces - Major General Denis Lyamin

- 22nd Army Corps
  - 127th Reconnaissance Brigade (Nakhimov district, City of Sevastopol)
    - Brigade HQ: Signal Battalion, Logistics and Support Company, Engineer Company, EW Company, Military Police Company, Chemical Protection Group, Medical Unit
    - Reconnaissance Battalion
    - ELINT Battalion
    - Psychological Warfare Company
    - UAV Company
  - 126th Guards Coastal Defence Brigade (Perevalnoe, Republic of Crimea). Since 2019, the brigade is armed with Tornado-G MLRS.
    - Brigade HQ: Reconnaissance Battalion, Engineer Battalion, Logistics Battalion, Signal Battalion, EW Company, Air Defence Company, Sniper Company, Chemical Protection Company, Medical Company, Howitzer Divizion, MLRS Divizion
    - 1st Motorized Battalion
    - 2nd Motorized Battalion
    - Mountain Infantry Battalion
    - Tank Battalion
  - 8th Coastal Artillery Regiment (Simferopol, Republic of Crimea). Since 2019, the regiment is armed with Tornado-G MLRS.
- 810th Separate Guards Naval Infantry Brigade (Gagarinsky district, Сity of Sevastopol)
  - Brigade HQ: Reconnaissance Battalion, Engineer Battalion, Logistics Battalion, Signal Company, Amphibious Company, Anti-tank Company, Flamethrower Company, Artillery Divizion
  - 557th Naval Infantry Battalion
  - 542nd Air Assault Battalion
  - 547th Air Defence Artillery Divizion
  - 538th Logistics and Support Battalion
- 382th Separate Naval Infantry Battalion (Temryuk, Krasnodar Krai)
- 388th Separate Marine Reconnaissance Unit (Nakhimov district, City of Sevastopol)
- 11th Separate Coastal Missile-Artillery Brigade (Anapa, Krasnodar Krai)
  - Brigade HQ: Engineer Battalion, Logistics and Support Company, Signal Company
  - 25th Coastal Missile-Artillery Divizion
  - 459th Coastal Missile-Artillery Divizion
  - Technical Support Divizion
- 15th Coastal Missile-Artillery Brigade (Lenin district, City of Sevastopol)
  - Brigade HQ: Engineer Company, Logistics and Support Company, Signal Company, Air Defence Divizion
  - Coastal Missile-Artillery Divizion
  - Coastal Missile-Artillery Divizion
  - Utyos Heavy Machine Gun Divizion
- 854th Coastal Missile Regiment (Khersones AFB, City of Sevastopol)
- 475th Electronic Warfare Center (Balaklava District, City of Sevastopol)
- 1096th Anti-Air Missile Regiment (Nakhimov district, City of Sevastopol)
- 68th Naval Engineer Regiment (Evpatoria, Republic of Crimea)
- 4th Nuclear, Biological and Chemical Protection Troops Regiment (Nakhimov district, City of Sevastopol)
- 133rd Logistics and Support Brigade (Bakhchisarai, Republic of Crimea)
- 1127th Artillery Repair Unit (Nakhimov district, City of Sevastopol)

=== Baltic Fleet ===
Chief of the Coastal Forces - Lieutenant General Andrei Guschin

- 11th Army Corps
  - 18th Guards Motor Rifle Division (Gusev, Kaliningrad Oblast)
    - Division HQ
    - 79th Motor Rifle Regiment
    - 275th Motor Rifle Regiment
    - 280th Motor Rifle Regiment
    - 11th Tank Regiment
    - 20th Reconnaissance Battalion
    - 26th Automobile Battalion
    - Signal Battalion
    - Engineer Battalion
  - 152nd Guards Missile Brigade (Chernyakhovsk, Kaliningrad Oblast)
  - 244th Artillery Brigade (Kaliningrad, Kaliningrad Oblast)
  - 7th Guards Motor Rifle Regiment (Kaliningrad, Kaliningrad Oblast)
  - 22nd Air Defence Missile Regiment (Kaliningrad, Kaliningrad Oblast)
  - 46th Separate Reconnaissance Battalion (Gusev, Kaliningrad Oblast)
  - 40th Separate Signal Battalion (Gusev, Kaliningrad Oblast)
- 44th Air Defence Division (Gvardeysk, Kaliningrad Oblast)
  - Division HQ
  - 183rd Air Defence Missile Regiment
  - 1543rd Air Defence Missile Regiment
  - 81st Radio-Technical Regiment
- 120th Guards Naval Infantry Division (Baltiysk, Kaliningrad Oblast)
  - Brigade HQ: Sniper Company, Airborne Company, Signal Company, Anti-tank Missile Divizion, Flamethrower Company, Engineer Company, Logistics and Support Company, Medical Company, Military Police Squad
  - 877th Naval Infantry Battalion
  - 879th Air Assault Battalion
  - 884th Naval Infantry Battalion
  - 724th Reconnaissance Battalion
  - 1612th Self-Propelled Artillery Divizion
  - 1592nd Self-Propelled Artillery Divizion
  - 1618th Air Defence Missile Divizion
- 25th Coastal Missile Brigade (Donskoe, Kaliningrad Oblast)
- 69th Naval Engineer Regiment (Gvardeysk, Kaliningrad Oblast)
- 302nd Electronic Warfare Regiment (Gvardeysk, Kaliningrad Oblast)
- 313th PDSS Detachment (Baltiysk, Kaliningrad Oblast)
- 473th PDSS Detachment (Kronstadt, City of Saint Petersburg)
- 319th Military Police Battalion (Chernyakhovsk, Kaliningrad Oblast)
- 1488th Separate Automobile Battalion (Kaliningrad, Kaliningrad Oblast)
- 561st Naval Reconnaissance Detachment (Parusnoye, Kaliningrad Oblast)
- 841st Electronic Warfare Center (Yantarny, Kaliningrad Oblast)
- 742nd Communications Center (Kaliningrad, Kaliningrad Oblast)

=== Northern Fleet ===
Chief of the Coastal Forces - Lieutenant General Dmitry Kraev

- 14th Army Corps
  - Corps HQ
  - 80th Arctic Motor Rifle Brigade (Alakurtti, Murmansk Oblast). Trained for combat operations in the Arctic region and protecting interests of Russia on the continental shelf.
    - Brigade HQ: Signal Battalion, Logistics and Support Company, Engineer Company, UAV Company, Military Police Company, Chemical Protection Group, Medical Company
    - 1st Motorized Battalion
    - 2nd Motorized Battalion
    - Reconnaissance Battalion
  - 200th Motorized Rifle Brigade (Arctic) (Pechenga, Murmansk Oblast)
    - Brigade HQ: Signal Battalion, Logistics and Support Company, UAV Company, Military Police Company, EW Company, Courrier Detachment
    - 583rd Motorized Battalion
    - 658th Motorized Battalion
    - 664th Motorized Battalion
    - 60th Guards Tank Battalion
    - 274th Guards Engineers Battalion
    - 416th Artillery Divizion
    - 471st Howitzer Divizion
    - 382nd MLRS Divizion
    - 871st Anti-tank Divizion
    - 226th Missile Air Defence Divizion
    - 246th Air Defence Divizion
  - 58th Signal Battalion (Murmansk, Murmansk Oblast)
- 61st Separate Naval Infantry Brigade (Sputnik, Murmansk Oblast):
  - Brigade HQ: Signal Company, Logistics and Support Company, Rifle Company
  - 874th Naval Infantry Battalion
  - 876th Air Assault Battalion
  - 317th Naval Infantry Battalion
  - 318th Naval Infantry Battalion
  - 886th Reconnaissance Battalion
  - 1591st Self-Propelled Artillery Divizion. Armed with Nona-SVK
  - 1611th Self-Propelled Artillery Divizion. Armed with Gvozdika
  - 1617th Anti-Air missile Artillery Divizion. Armed with 2K22 Tunguska
  - 180th Naval Engineer Battalion
  - 75th Naval Infirmary. It is the main hospital of the Northern Fleet, consisting of a mobile detachment of medical workers for operations in the combat formations of the landing force.
- 536th Guards Coastal Missile-Artillery Brigade (Snezhnogorsk, Murmansk Oblast)
  - Brigade HQ: Engineer Company, Logistics and Support Company, Signal Company, Air Defence Divizion
  - Coastal Missile-Artillery Divizion
  - Coastal Missile-Artillery Divizion
- 63rd Naval Engineer Regiment (Severomorsk, Murmansk Oblast)
- 99th Tactical Arctic Detachment (Kotelny Island, Sakha Republic)
- 71st Tactical Arctic Detachment (Franz Josef Land, Arkhangelsk Oblast)
- 160th PDSS Detachment (Vidyaevo, Murmansk Oblast)
- 269th PDSS Detachment (Gadzhiyevo, Murmansk Oblast)
- 313th PDSS Detachment (Sputnik, Murmansk Oblast)
- 741st Communications Center (Severomorsk, Murmansk Oblast)
- 186th Electronic Warfare Center (Severomorsk, Murmansk Oblast)
- 211th Naval Infantry Security Battalion (Olenegorsk, Murmansk Oblast)
- 58th Separate Security Company (Gadzhiyevo, Murmansk Oblast)

=== Caspian Flotilla ===
- 177th Naval Infantry Regiment (Kaspiysk, Republic of Dagestan) (in service with the BTR-82, BTR-80, MT-LB)
  - 414th Guards Naval Infantry Battalion (Kaspiysk, Republic of Dagestan)
  - 727th Naval Infantry Battalion (Astrakhan, Astrakhan Oblast)
- 46th Coastal Missile Divizion (Kaspiysk, Republic of Dagestan)
- 847th Coastal Missile Divizion(Kaspiysk, Republic of Dagestan)
