= 71st Guards Motor Rifle Division =

Russian military formation

71st Guards Motor Rifle Pechenga Order of Kutuzov Division (2025–present) 200th Separate Guards Motor Rifle Pechenga Order of Kutuzov Brigade (2009–2025) 131st Motor Rifle Pechenga Order of Kutuzov Division (1957–2009) 45th Rifle Pechenga Division (1943–1957)
- 71-я гвардейская мотострелковая Печенгская ордена Кутузова дивизия
- Shoulder sleeve patch of the unit
- Active: 1 December 1997 – present
- Country: Russia
- Branch: Russian Ground Forces
- Type: Mechanized infantry
- Size: Division
- Part of: 14th Army Corps
- Garrison/HQ: Pechenga, Murmansk Oblast
- Engagements: Russo-Ukrainian War; War in Donbas; Russian invasion of Ukraine; Battle of Kharkiv (2022); Kharkiv counteroffensive; Battle of Chasiv Yar; 2025 Sumy offensive
- Decorations: Guards; Order of Kutuzov
- Honorifics: Pechenga

Commanders
- Current commander: Colonel Denis Yuryevich Kurilo

The 71st Guards Motor Rifle Pechenga Order of Kutuzov Division (Russian: 71-я гвардейская мотострелковая Печенгская ордена Кутузова дивизия) is a Russian Armed Forces formation of the 14th Army Corps, part of the Leningrad Military District, based at Pechenga in Murmansk Oblast. The division was formed from the 200th Separate Guards Motor Rifle Brigade in 2025. The 200th Separate Motorized Rifle Brigade was formed on December 1, 1997 on the basis of the former 131st Motorized Rifle Division.

The formation is part of the 14th Army Corps of the Leningrad Military District. Its permanent deployment point is the settlement of Pechenga-Luostari, Murmansk Oblast. The division headquarters is located near the settlement of Pechenga (formerly Petsamo) Murmansk Oblast, 10 km from the Norway–Russia border.

In 2014, brigade units participated in the War in Donbas. In 2022, brigade units participated in the Russian invasion of Ukraine. On April 27, 2023, by Decree of the President of the Russian Federation No. 312, the 200th Brigade was awarded the honorary title of "Guards".

== History ==
=== Formation ===
The 200th Brigade was formed from the former 131st Motor Rifle Division in 1997. It inherited the honorifics "Pechenga Order of Kutuzov" from the division.

Transition to professional contract status was planned to finish at the end of 2006. At the beginning of April 2006, the brigade had about 700 professional personnel, practically all sergeant positions having been filled by kontraktniks (Russian: контрактник contracted professional soldiers). More than 180 military men and women have signed contracts for service in communications, medical, and rear services subunits. The brigade had about 10 professional soldiers from other Commonwealth of Independent States members. At the beginning of 2006, during a trip to the Leningrad Military District, the 200th Brigade was visited by the Minister of Defence, Sergei Ivanov. The brigade had association links with the Norwegian 6th Division (Norway) and the Swedish Norrbotten Regiment.

It formed part of the 6th Army in the Western Military District. As of November 2011 it became the first of two new Arctic brigades of the Russian Ground Forces. The unit had some disciplinary problems in 2011. In November 2012 it became part of the Coastal Troops of the Northern Fleet.

=== War in Donbas ===
In 2014, the brigade was involved in the war in Donbas. Elements of the brigade participated in the battle of Luhansk Airport and were spotted in the Khryashchevatoe village, a Luhansk suburb. In October 2014, Senior Lieutenant Yevgeny Trundayev, commander of the anti-tank platoon of the 1st Motorized Infantry Battalion, was killed in the clashes for 32nd checkpoint, a battle in Luhansk region. He was later awarded the title of Hero of the Russian Federation.

The brigade has formed part of the 14th Army Corps since the corps' formation in April 2017.

In late January 2022, the brigade deployed from Pechenga, via trains over a few days, to the training area in Postoyalye Dvory, east of Kursk, to participate in what the Russian Ministry of Defence described as combat drills. By February 19, the brigade moved to Belgorod and remained there until the eve of the invasion.

=== Russian invasion of Ukraine ===
On 24 February, the brigade entered operations as part of the invasion of Ukraine, operating in the area near Kharkiv. Troops of the brigade were seen operating roadblocks northeast of the city. A platoon sized element was seen entering the city on MT-LBs accompanied by a T-80 tank and anti-aircraft gun. They were later destroyed by a unit of the Ukrainian 93rd Mechanized Brigade. A column of BM-21 rocket artillery vehicles were also destroyed outside the city. Pro-Ukrainian sources reported that the commander of the brigade's 382nd Separate Rocket Artillery Battalion, LtCol Dinar Khametov, was killed during the battle. The brigade's artillery group continued to take further losses.

By early-March, the brigade had suffered large losses and their commander, Col Denis Kurilo, was severely wounded and left the brigade. Members of the unit were seen operating in Derhachi. It is likely two battalion tactical groups and its rocket artillery battalion were rather rendered combat ineffective during this time period. Deployed troops of the brigade suffered heavy casualties near Kharkiv with more than 30 units of equipment destroyed or captured. The Governor of Murmansk Oblast regularly announced the deaths of prominent members of the brigade including Maj. Leonid Belyakov. To replace the losses the brigade suffered, a battalion tactical group consisting of reservist, coastal troops, and sailors, reportedly with little combat training, was sent to Ukraine in July.

It is estimated that by late May 2022, the brigade had suffered heavy casualties and had fewer than 900 soldiers, compared to more than 1,400 at the beginning of the invasion. According to one source, as of December 2022, the brigade was visually confirmed to have lost 40% of its vehicles.

By September 2022, Ukraine launched its counteroffensive in Kharkiv, liberating most of the occupied parts of the oblast. Following the Ukrainian liberation of Kupiansk, units from the brigade attempted to recapture the settlement, however, they were encircled by units of Ukraine's 92nd Mechanized Brigade and forced to retreat reportedly resulting in 30 killed and 10 wounded, including a company commander. 7 armored vehicles were also reportedly lost.

The brigade was awarded the Guards designation on 27 April 2023.

It was reported by the newspaper Izvestia on 4 July 2023, that the 200th Separate Motor Rifle Brigade and the 80th Arctic Motor Rifle Brigade would merge to form a new motor rifle division, the first component of the 14th Army Corps' elevation into a combined arms army.

In June 2025, the brigade was reformed into the 71st Guards Motor Rifle Division.

== Structure ==
=== Composition of the 200th Separate Motor Rifle Brigade in 2019 ===
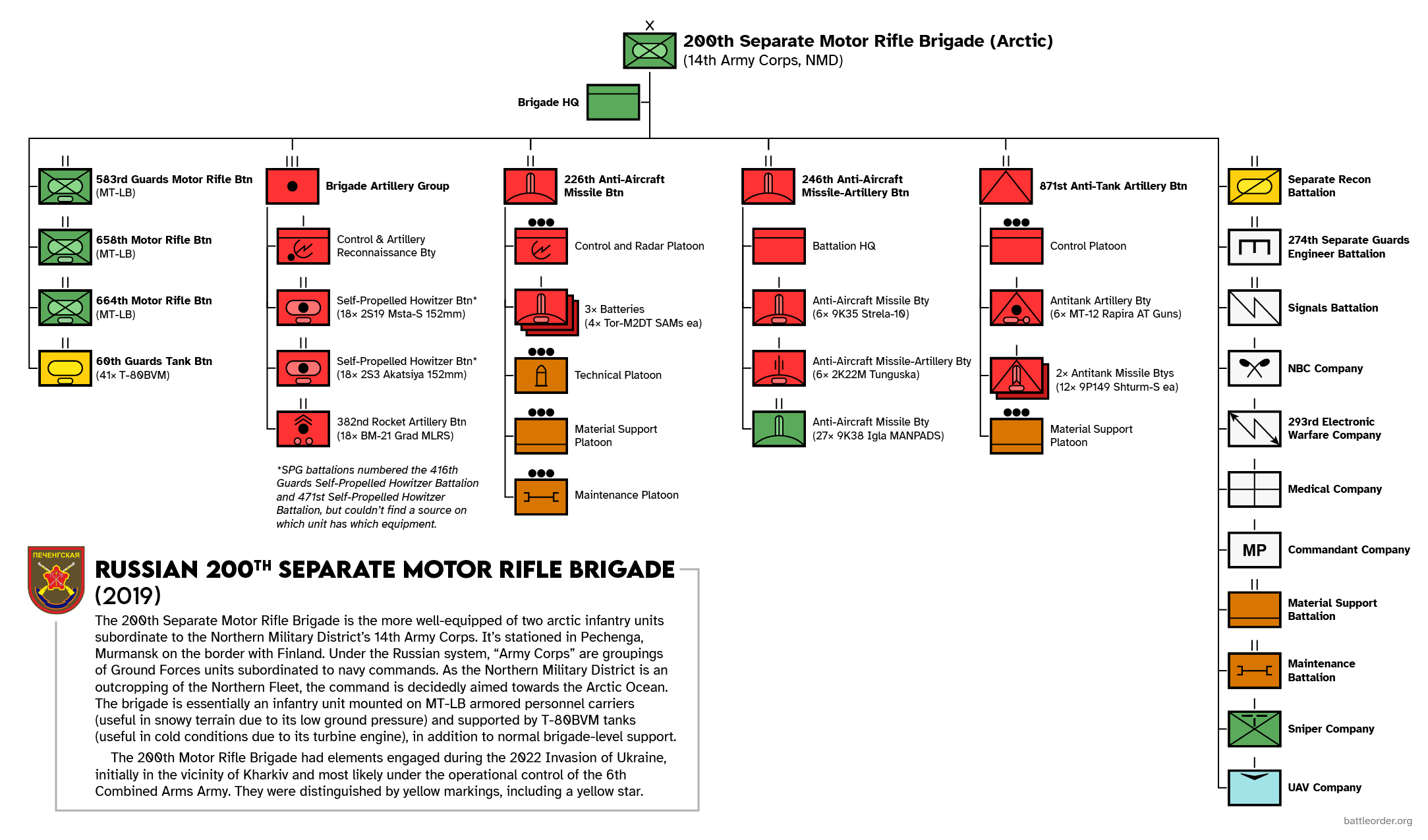
200th Separate Motor Rifle Battalion organization, as of 2019

The 200th Separate Motor Rifle Brigade consists of a brigade headquarters, three motor rifle battalions, one tank battalion, a brigade artillery group (coordinating two separate self-propelled howitzer battalions and one separate rocket artillery battalion), an anti-aircraft missile battalion, an anti-aircraft missile-artillery battalion, an anti-tank artillery battalion, a reconnaissance battalion, and several directly subordinated combat support and combat service support battalions and companies.

- Brigade Headquarters
  - 274th Separate Guards Engineer Battalion
  - 293rd Electronic Warfare Company
  - 185th Postal Service Station
  - Separate Reconnaissance Battalion
  - Separate Communications Battalion
  - NBC Defense Company
  - Medical Company
  - Commandant Company
  - Separate Material Support Battalion
  - Maintenance Battalion
  - Sniper Company
  - UAV Company
- 583rd Separate Guards Motor Rifle Battalion (MT-LB)
- 658th Separate Motor Rifle Battalion (MT-LB)
- 664th Separate Motor Rifle Battalion (MT-LB)
- 60th Separate Guards Tank Battalion (T-80BVM)
- Brigade Artillery Group (BrAG)
  - Control and Reconnaissance Battery (for brigade Chief of Artillery)
  - 416th Separate Guards Howitzer Self-Propelled Artillery Division (152mm)
  - 471st Separate Guards Howitzer Self-Propelled Artillery Division (152mm)
  - 382nd Separate Rocket Artillery Battalion (BM-21)
- 871st Separate Anti-Tank Artillery Battalion
- 226th Separate Anti-Aircraft Missile Battalion
- 246th Separate Anti-Aircraft Missile-Artillery Battalion

=== Composition of the 71st Guards Motor Rifle Division in 2025 ===
- Command (headquarters + command post\command post);
- 126th Motor Rifle Regiment;
- 127th Motor Rifle Regiment;
- 27th Separate Tank Battalion;
- 87th Self-Propelled Artillery Regiment;
- 37th Separate Anti-Tank Artillery Division;
- 53rd Separate Anti-Aircraft Missile Division;
- 57th Separate Reconnaissance Battalion;
- 9th Separate Engineer Battalion;
- 43rd Separate Communications Battalion;
- 129th Separate Logistics Battalion;
- 4th separate medical evacuation battalion.

== Tasks ==
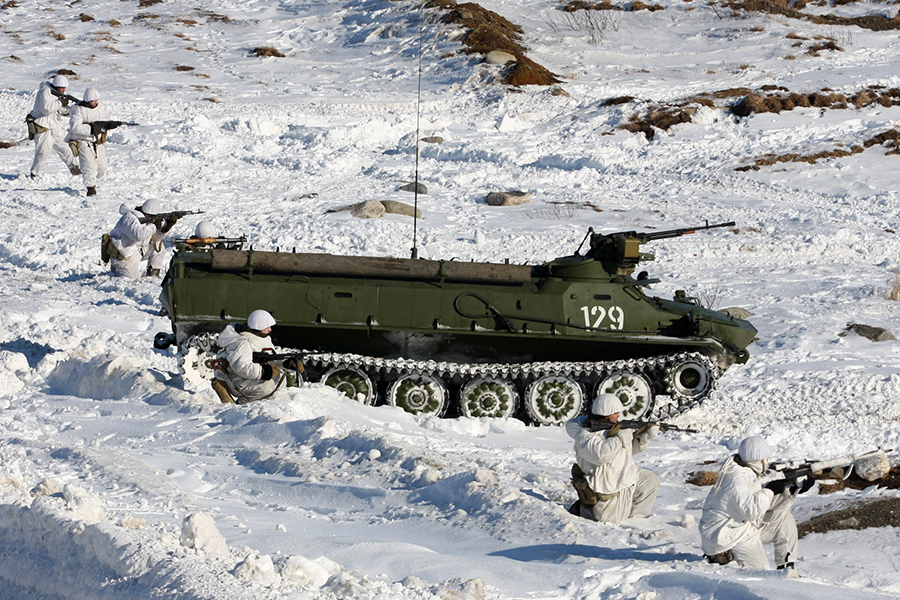
Combat training in the Arctic in 2012.

Driving the T-80BVM and MT-LBVMK on difficult terrain.

The 71st Guards Motor Rifle Division is an integral part of the ground group covering the northern border. This group also includes coastal troops and the 61st Separate Guards Naval Infantry Brigade of the Northern Fleet.

On December 1, 2012, the unit was formally transferred to the coastal forces of the Northern Fleet. Plans were announced to transform the 200th Brigade into an Arctic Brigade for combat operations in Arctic conditions.

Despite the specific nature of motorized rifle units intended to perform tasks on land, reconnaissance units of the motorized rifle formation of the Western Military District also undergo airborne training in full. During the training, the young replenishment of the military reconnaissance units of the 200th separate motorized rifle brigade will study the theoretical foundations of parachute jumping, the technical and operational characteristics of landing parachutes, actions during landing after equipment, and learn how to properly adjust weapons and equipment for a parachute jump.

== Equipment ==
The 71st Guards Motor Rifle Division has the following equipment:

- 41 × T-80BVM Main Battle Tanks
- 36 × 2S19 Msta self-propelled howitzers
- 18 × BM-21 Grad Multiple Rocket Launchers
- MT-LB based 9P149 tank destroyers with 9K114 Shturm Anti-tank missile
- SA-13 Gopher
- Rapira 100mm anti-tank gun
- SA-8 Gecko
- Barnaul-T air defence system
- SA-19 Grison

== Commanders ==
- Colonel Vitaly Leonidovich Razgonov (September 2009–April 2011)
- Colonel Denis Kurilo (2022)

== Gallery ==
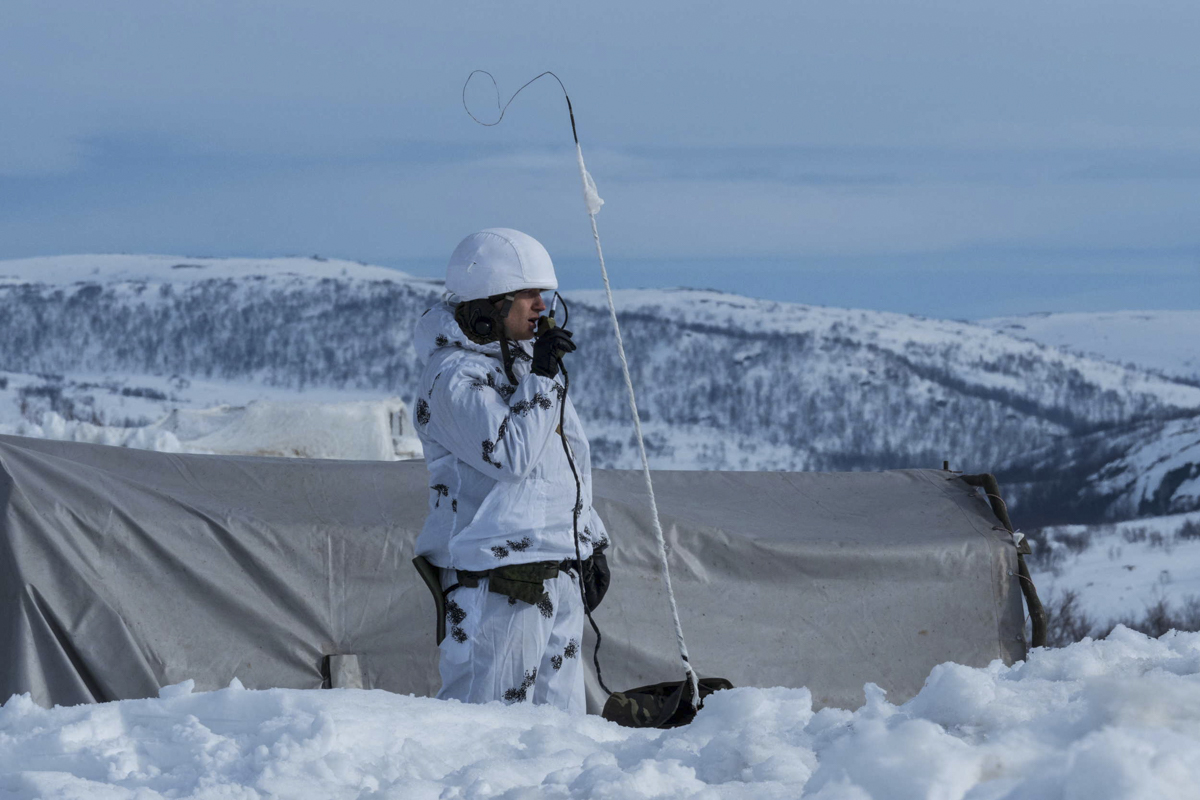

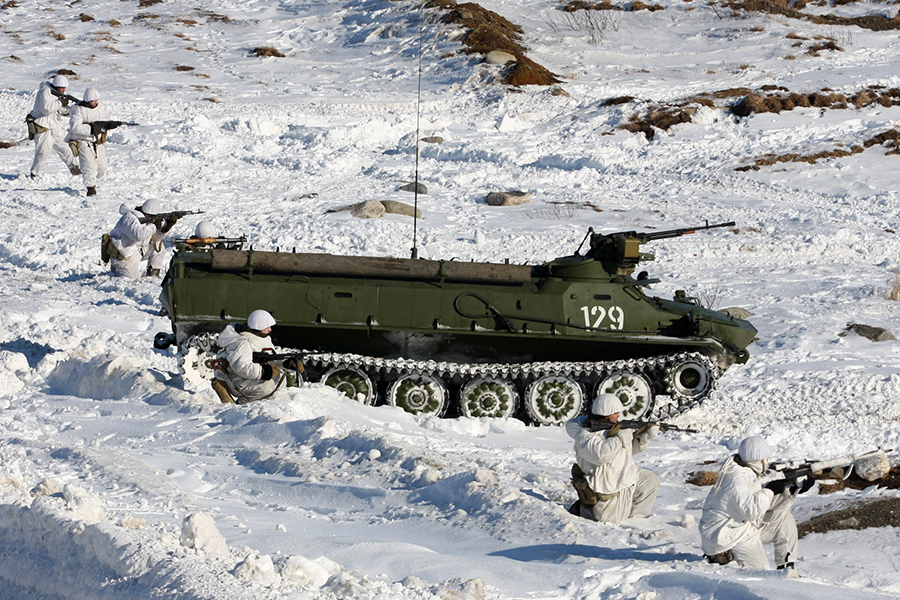

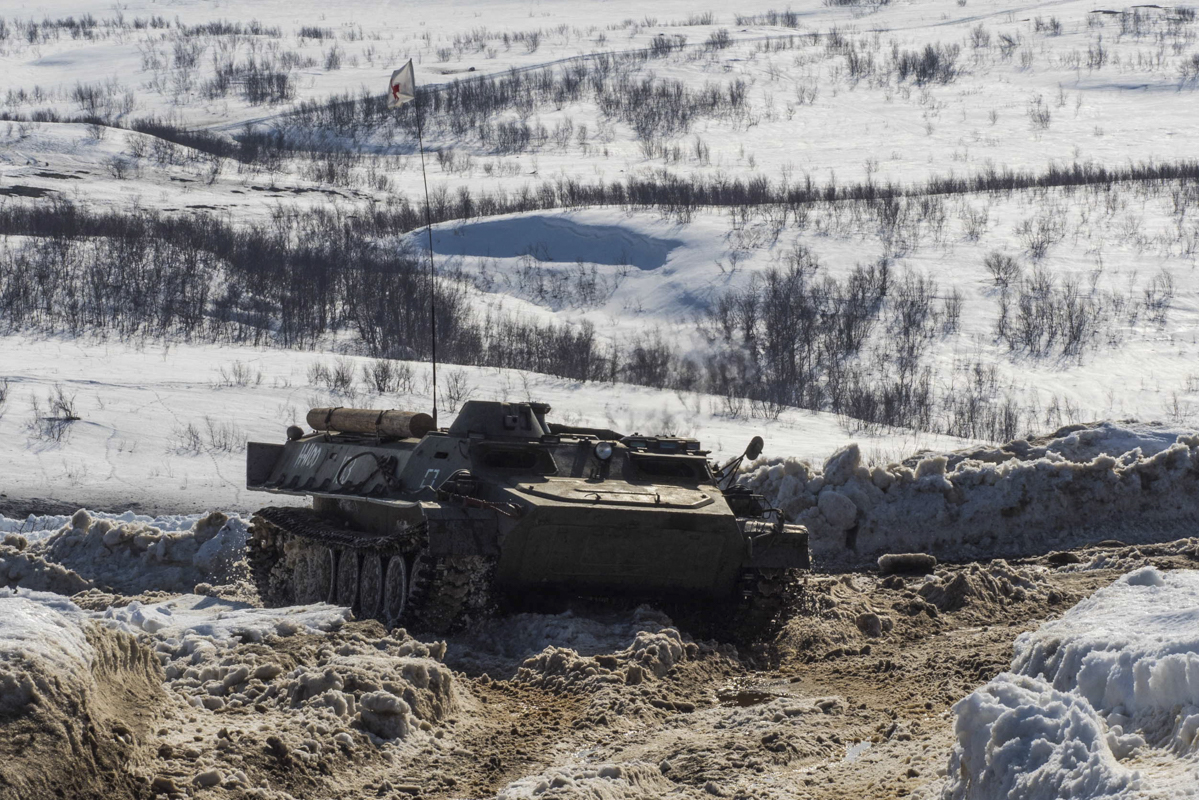

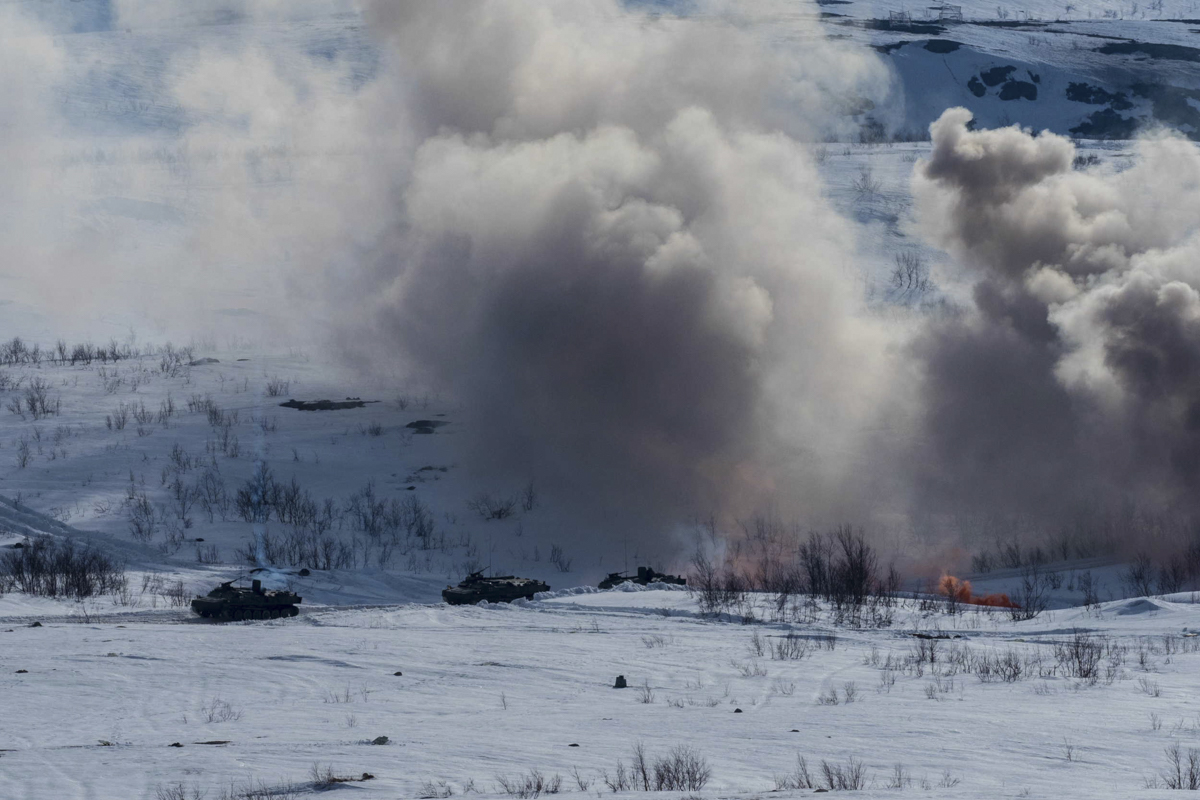

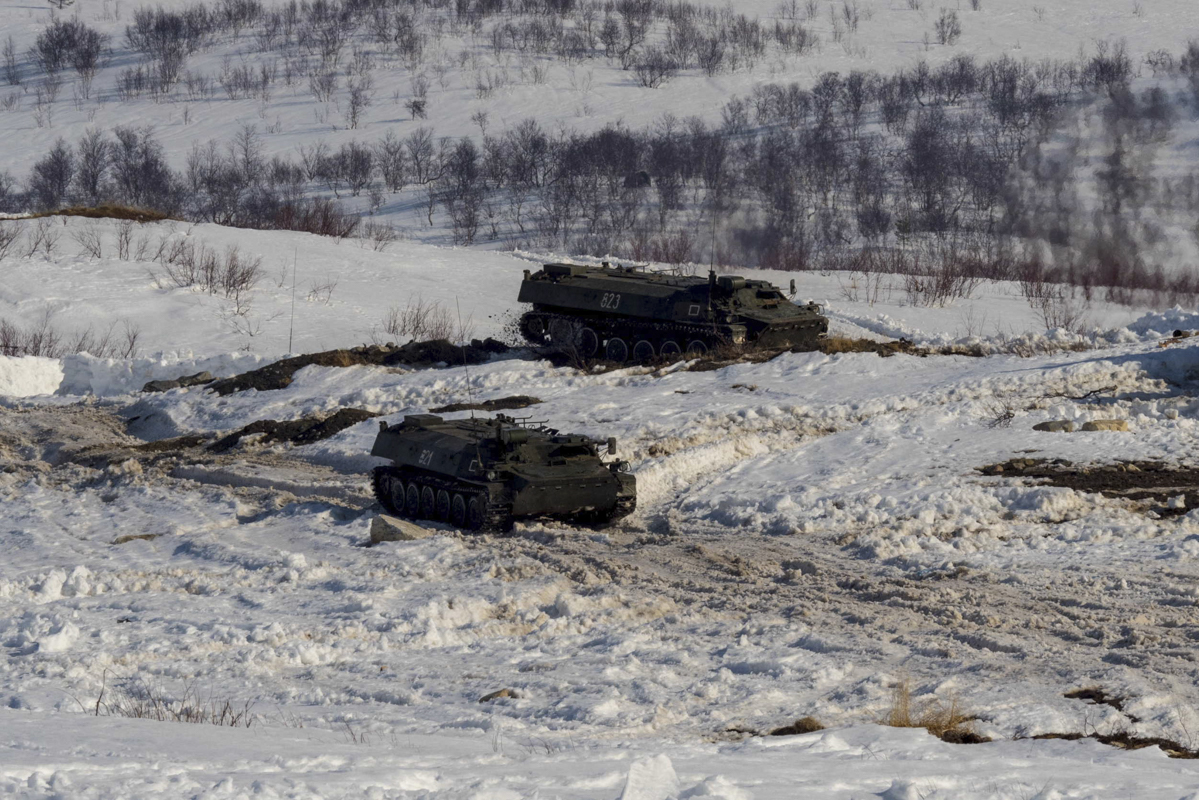

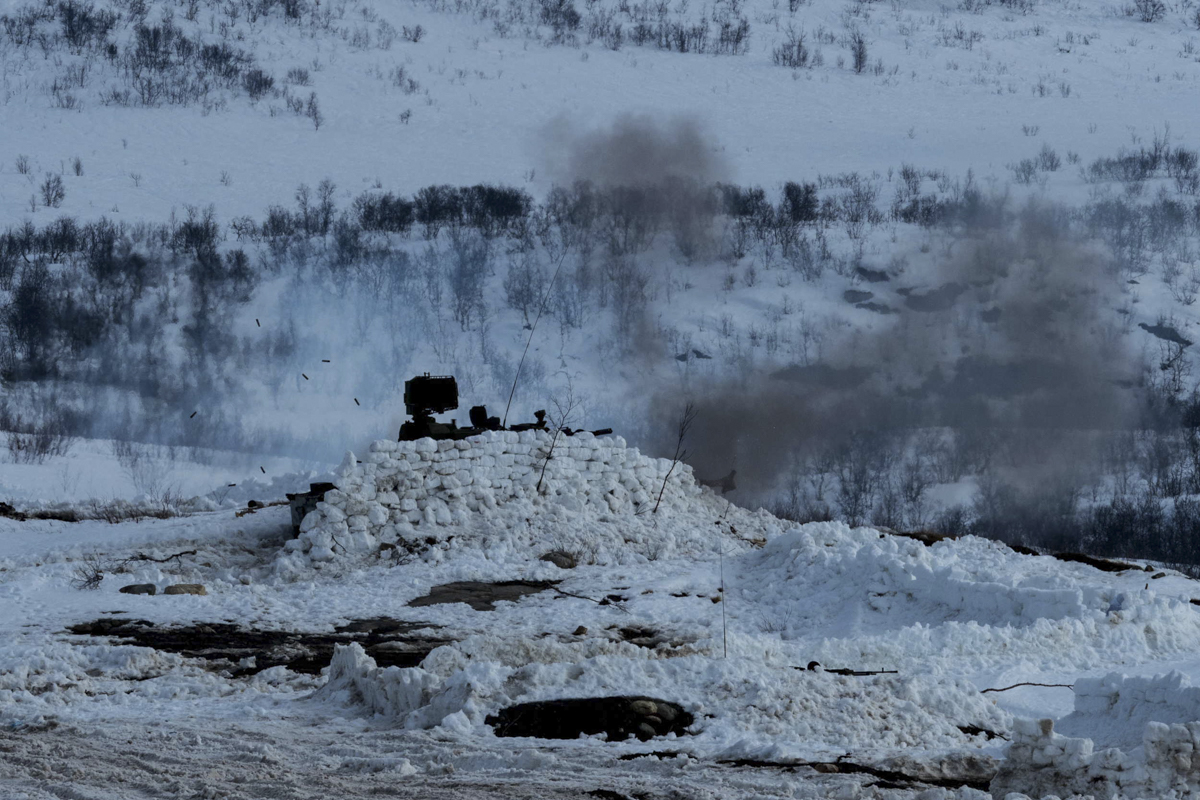

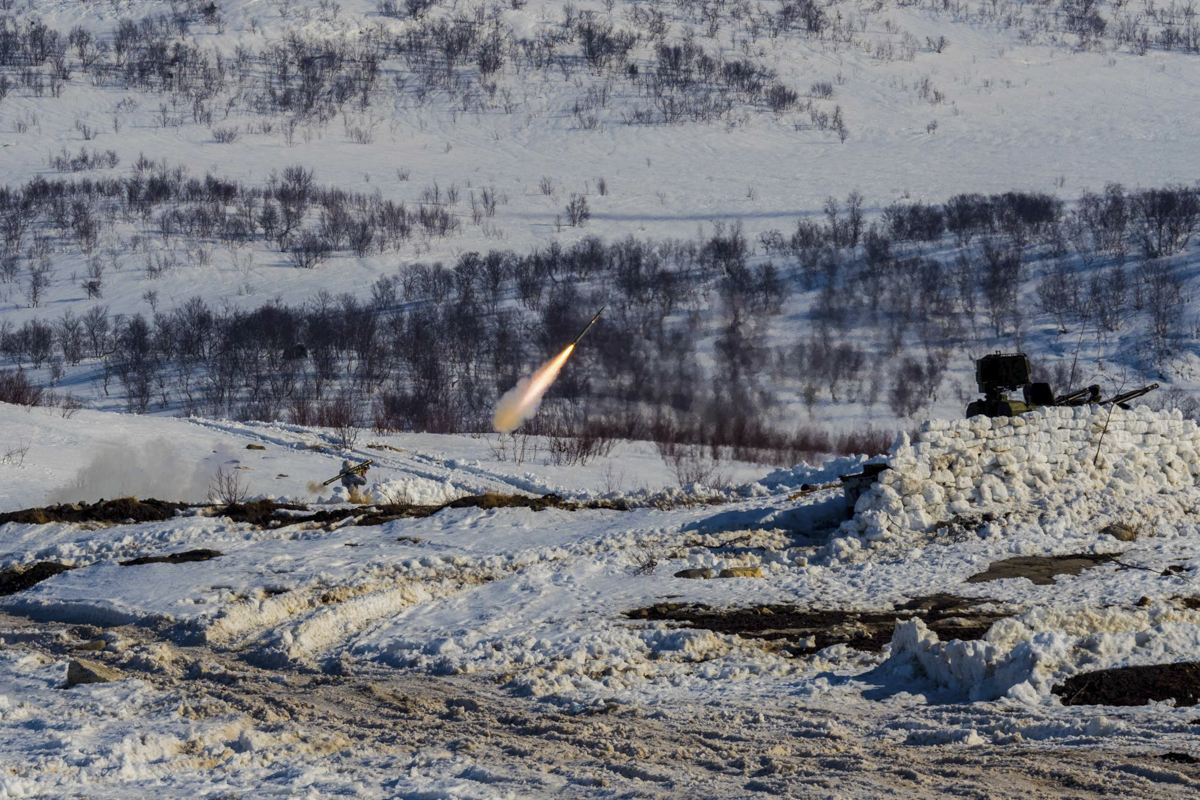

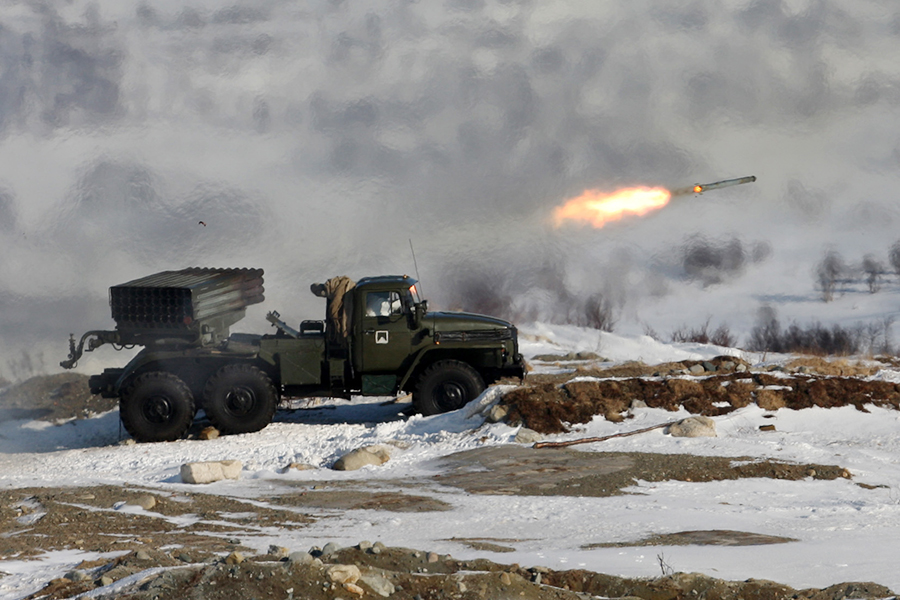

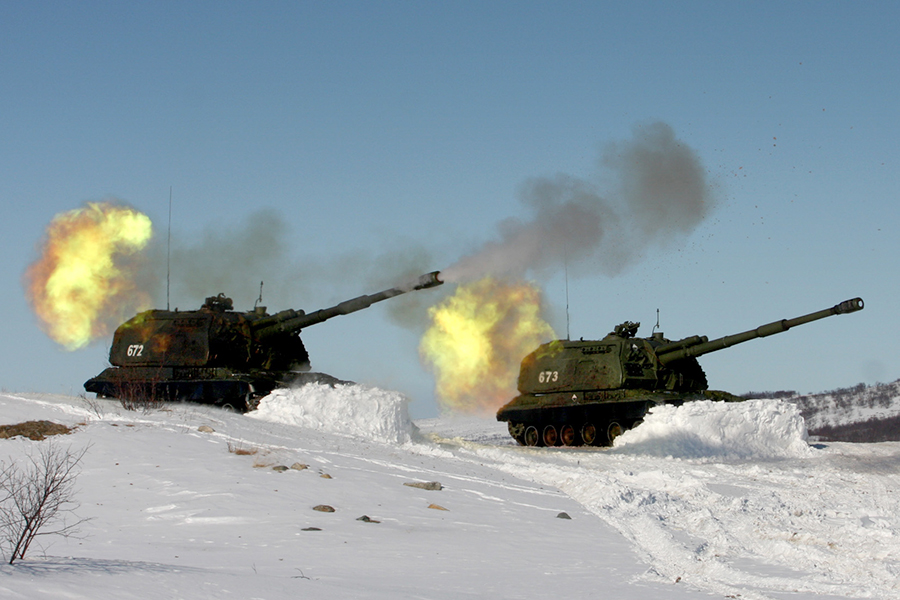

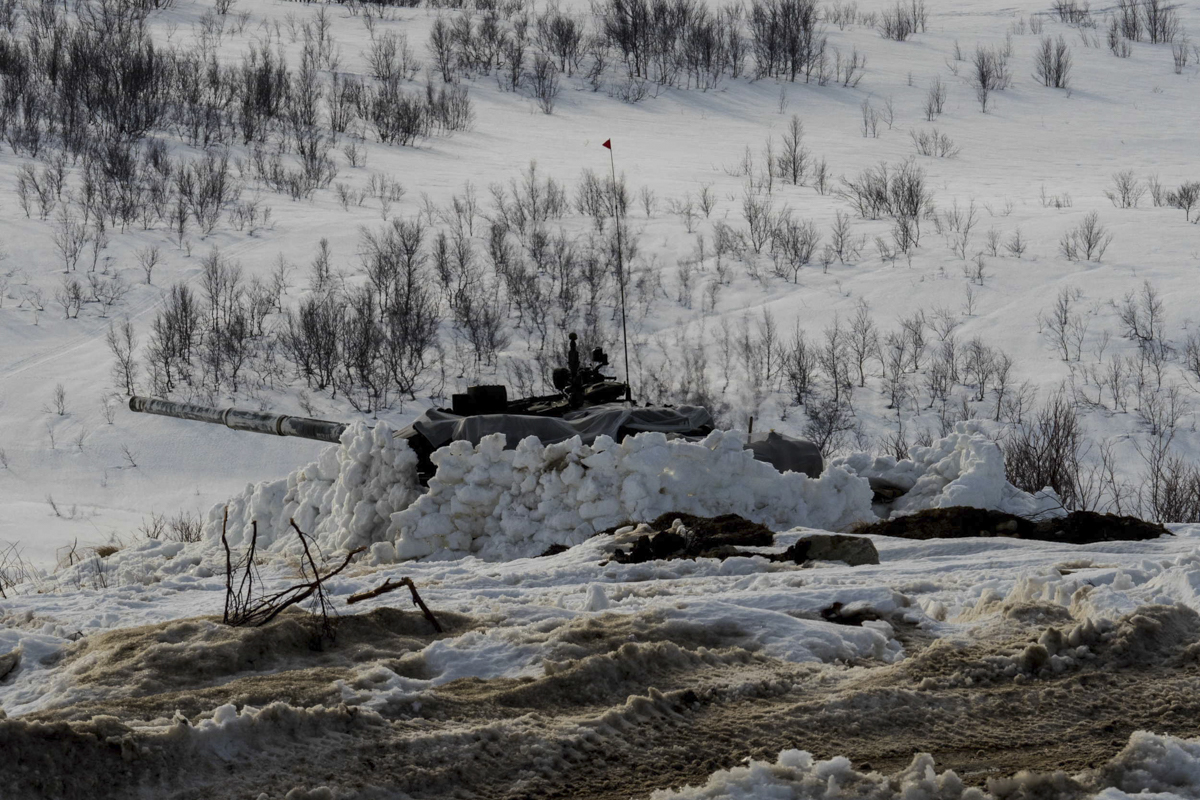

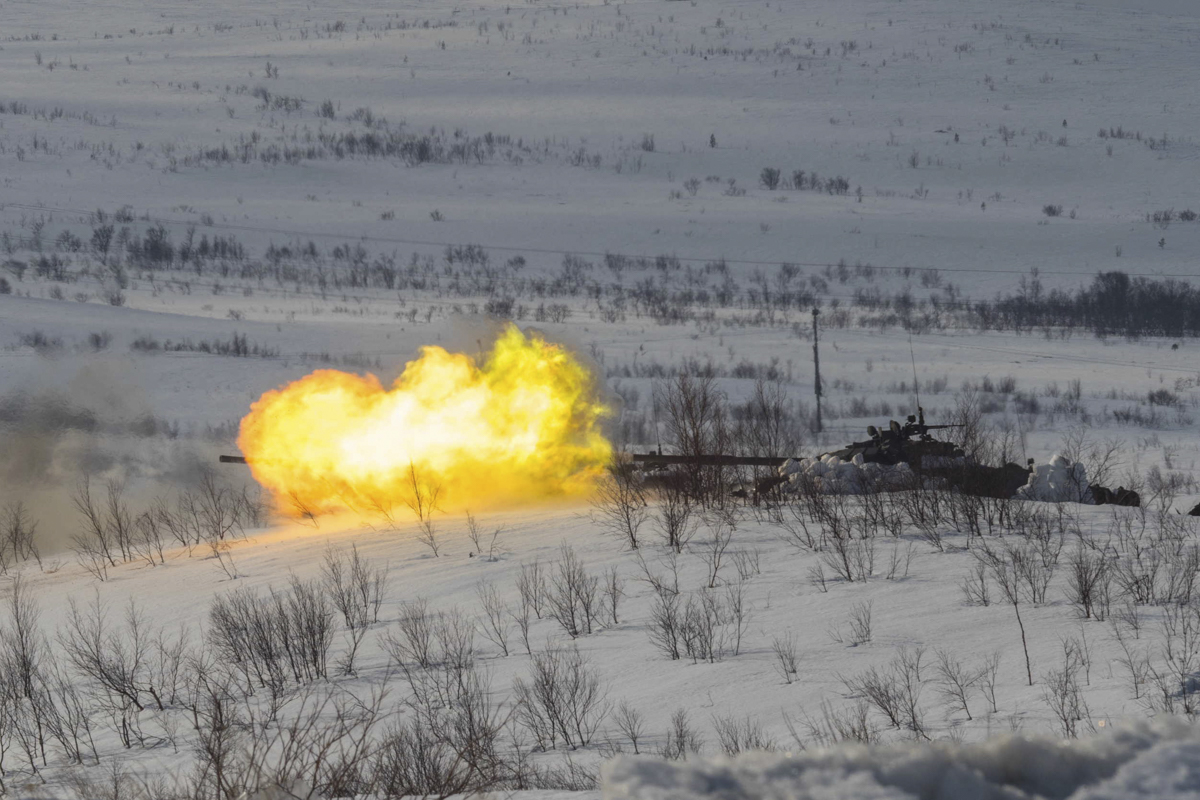

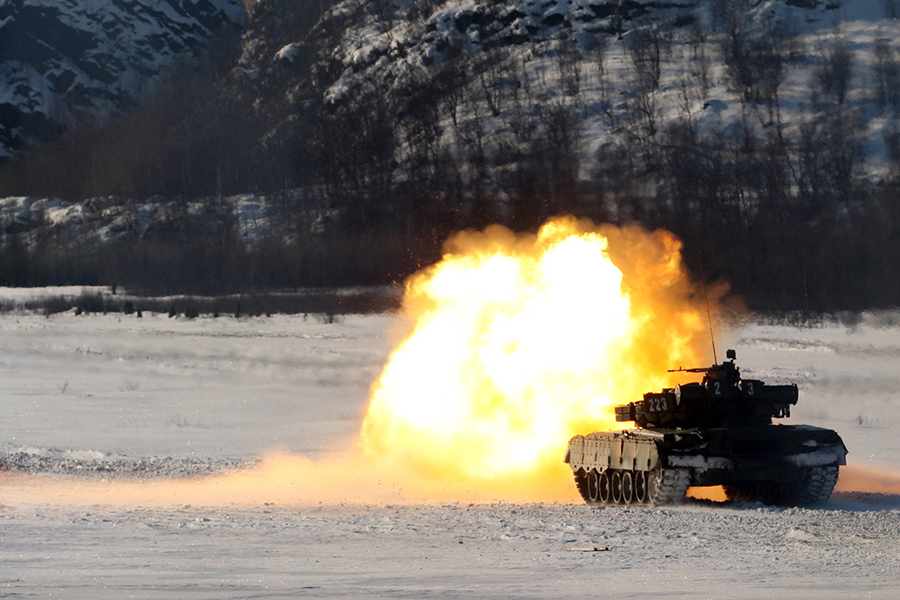

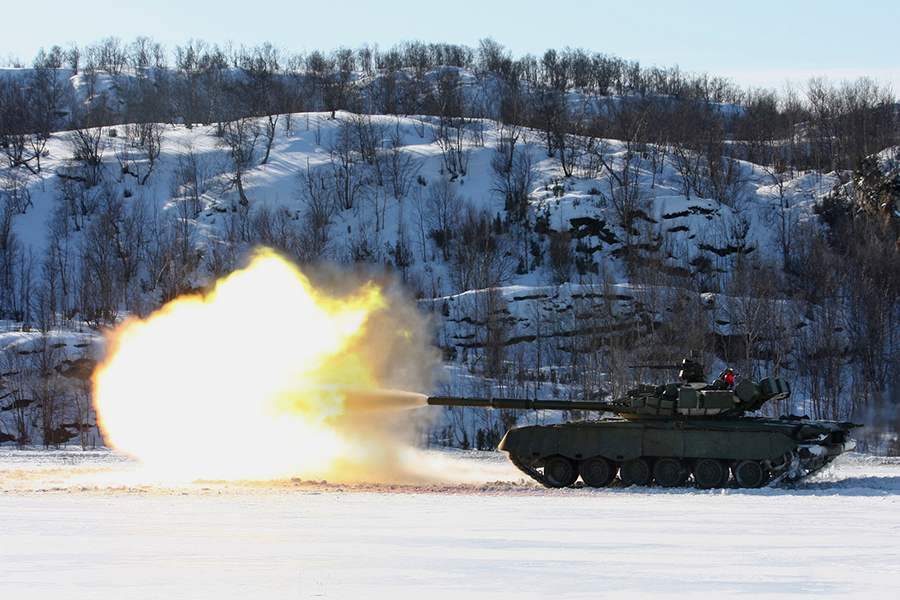
