= 80th Arctic Motor Rifle Brigade =

- 80-я мотострелковая бригада
- Brigade badge
- Active: 2014–Present
- Country: Russia
- Branch: Russian Navy: Coastal Troops
- Type: Mechanized infantry
- Role: Arctic Warfare
- Size: 2,000 servicemen
- Part of: 14th Army Corps
- Garrison/HQ: Alakurtti, Murmansk Oblast

The 80th Arctic Motor Rifle Brigade (80-я мотострелковая бригада) (Military Unit Number: 34667) is a specialist arctic warfare formation of the Coastal Troops of the Russian Navy formed in 2014.

== History ==
=== Formation ===
The brigade was formed on 31 December 2014, and its battle flag presented on 17 January 2015 by the commander of the Northern Fleet, Admiral Vladimir Korolev. The brigade was formed to be the second specialized arctic brigade in the Arctic, along with its sister unit the 200th Separate Motor Rifle Brigade.

As of 2020, the brigade falls under the command of the specially formed 14th Army Corps, itself part of the Northern Fleet Joint Strategic Command. The brigade's mission is to patrol the border and protect permanent locations along the Russian-Norwegian Border. The brigade is based in the village of Alakurtti in the Murmansk Oblast.

Recruits of the new brigade undergo severe psychological, physical, and arctic training and testing.

=== Russian invasion of Ukraine ===
It took part in the Russian invasion of Ukraine. It was sent to the Donbas region at the end of June 2022.

In July 2023, the Russian Ministry of Defense awarded service members of the brigade for destroying Ukrainian military equipment in Kherson Oblast.

It was reported by the newspaper Izvestia on July 4, 2023, that the 200th Separate Motor Rifle Brigade and the 80th Arctic Motor Rifle Brigade would merge to form a new motor rifle division, the first component of the 14th Army Corps' elevation into a combined arms army.

In September 2024, Newsweek reported that the 80th Arctic Motor Rifle Brigade suffered 80 percent casualties around the Dnieper–Bug estuary the previous April.

== Composition ==
Many recruits tend to want to join these new "specialist units." The arctic brigades are significantly smaller than the Table of Organization and Equipment of other motor rifle brigades. These brigades also have new arctic equipment.

Two sources in 2017 and 2020 give some of the following units as part of an Arctic motor rifle brigade:

- Brigade Headquarters
- Commandant's Company (HQ Company)
- Communications Battalion
- Electronic Warfare Company
- Reconnaissance Battalion
- 1st Arctic Motor Rifle Battalion
- 2nd Arctic Motor Rifle Battalion
- Snipers Company
- Self-Propelled Artillery Battalion
- Anti-Aircraft Missile Battalion (other Motor Rifle Brigades (MRBs) can have a battalion)
- Engineer Company (other MRBs can have a battalion)
- Logistics Company (see above note)
- Maintenance Battalion
- Medical Company
- CBRN Protection Company
- UAV Company

== Equipment ==
The brigade's transport equipment consists mainly of MT-LBVMK AFVs, articulated tracked vehicles like DT-10, DT-30 and TTM-4902, snowmobiles A-1 and TTM-1901 "Berkut" with a heated cabin and all-wheel drive Ural and KAMAZ trucks, adapted to extremely low temperatures.

The brigade is also armed with 2S1 Gvozdika self-propelled howitzers.

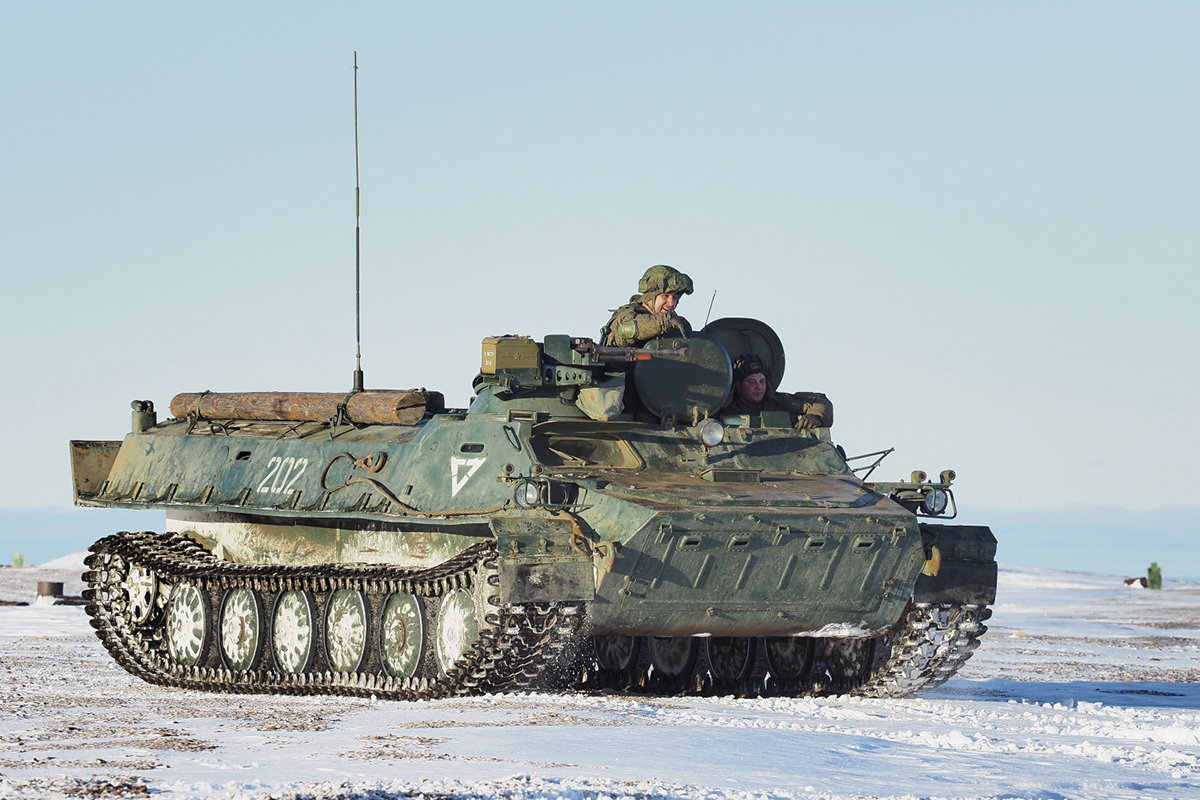
MT-LBVMK

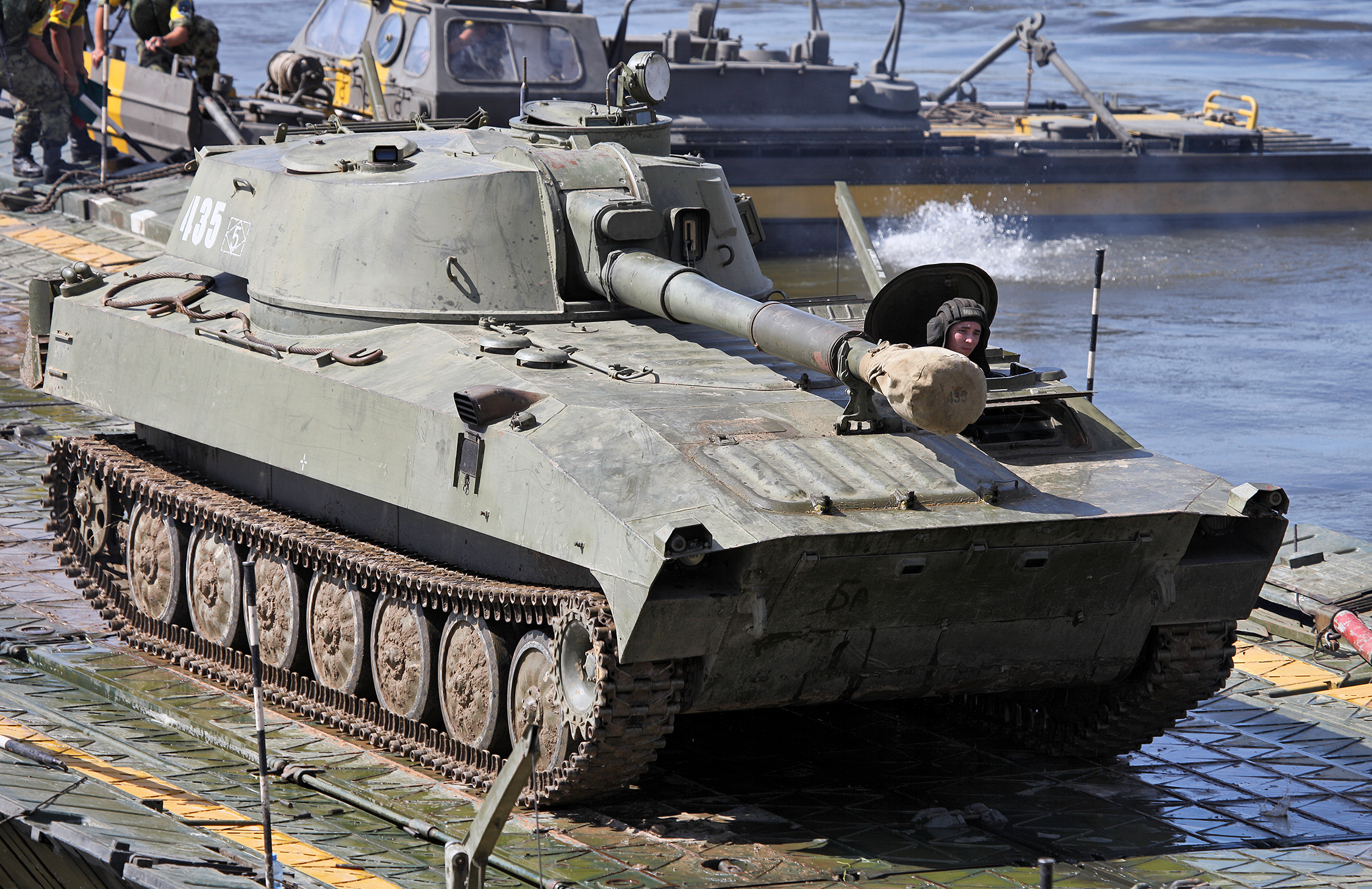
2S1 Gvozdika

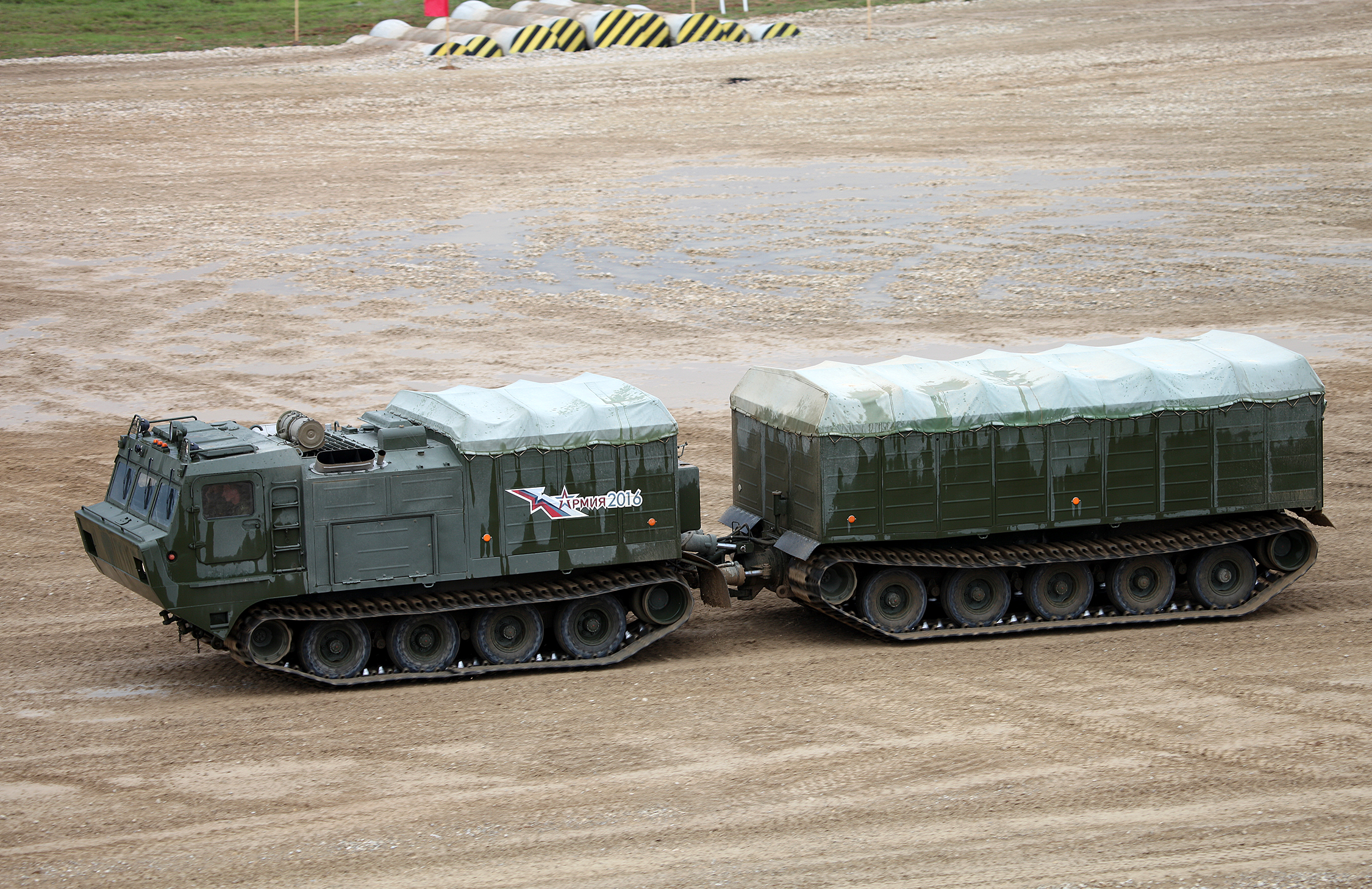
DT-10

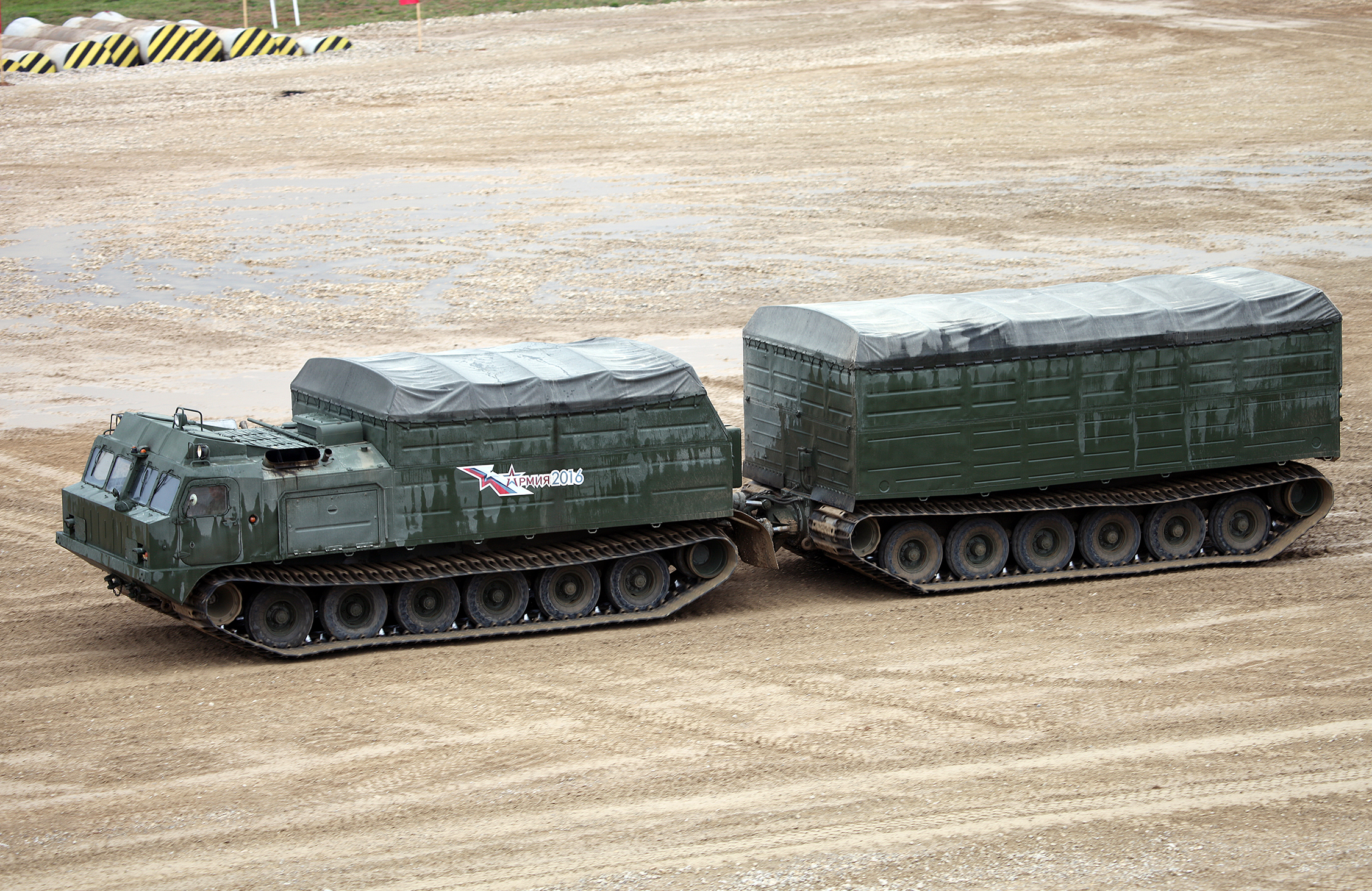
DT-30

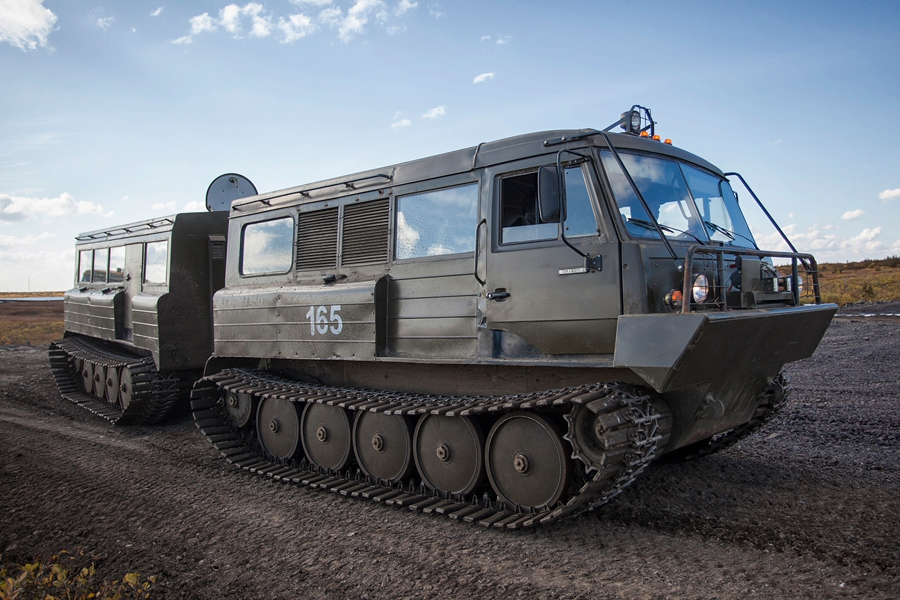
TTM-4902

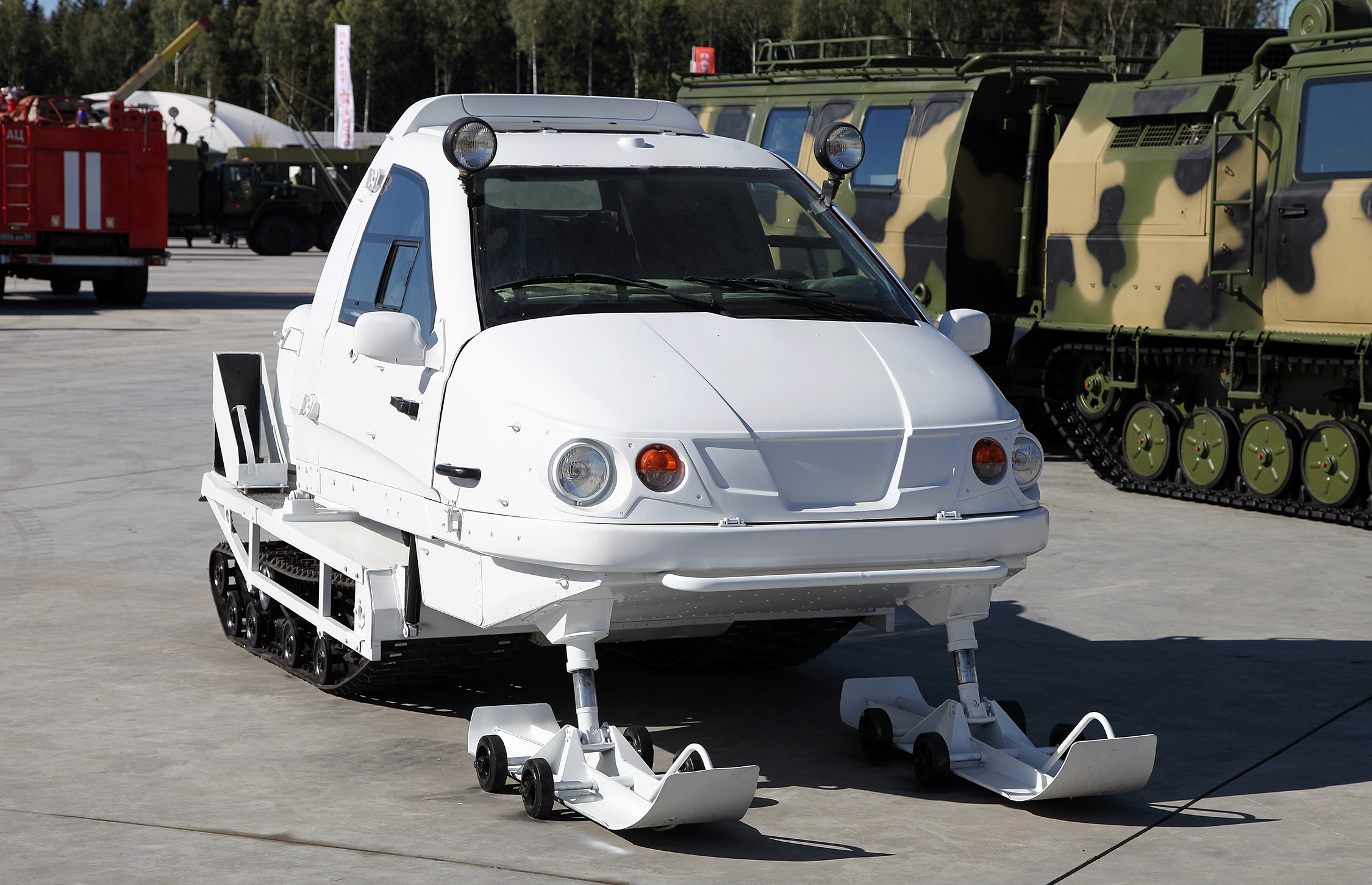
TTM-1901 Berkut

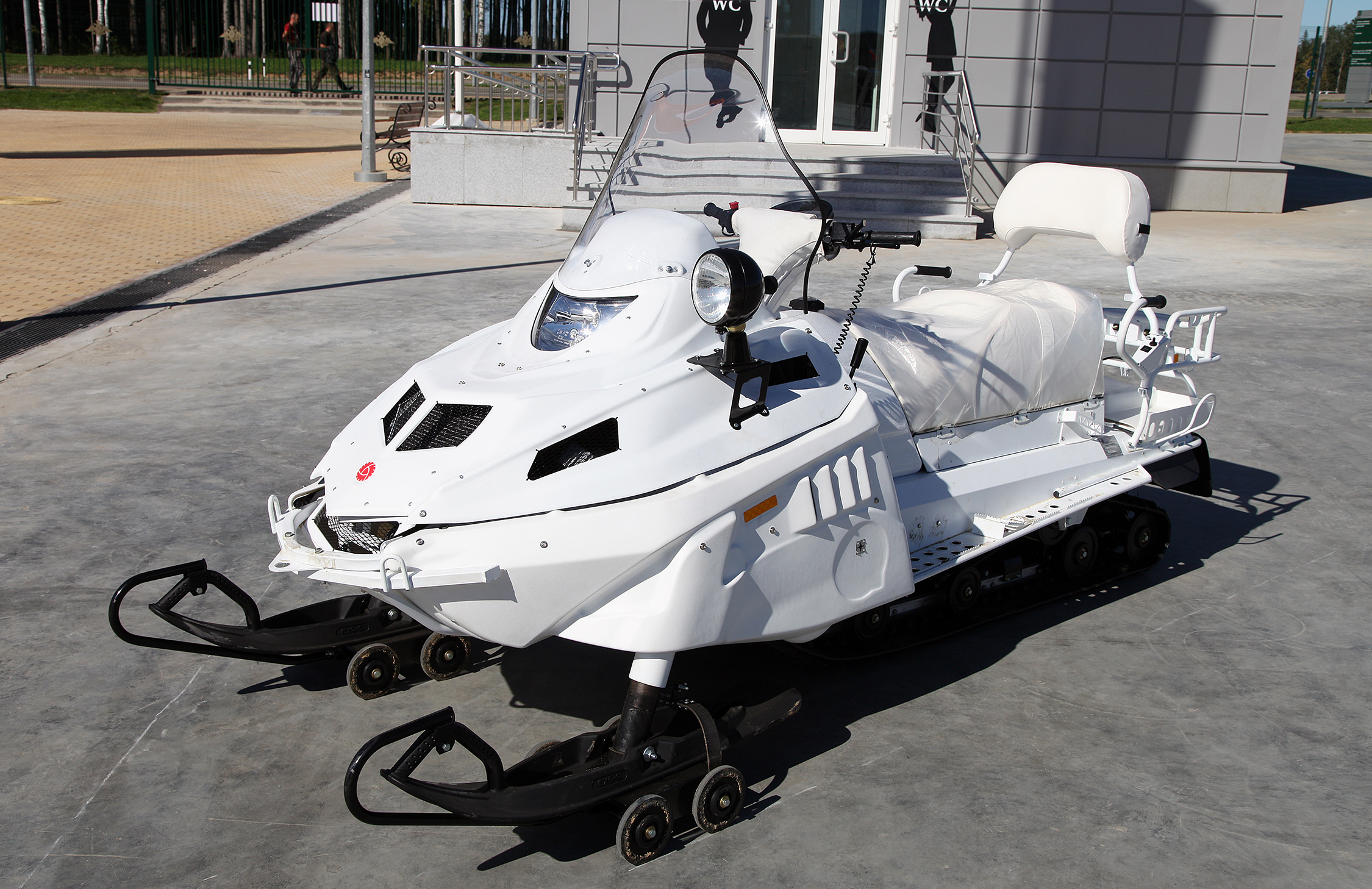
A-1

== Footnotes ==
- DAvid Axe, Russia's Reindeer Brigade is fighting for its survival in Southern Ukraine, Forbes, 7 October 2022
