= 11th Army Corps (Russian Federation) =

Russian Coastal Troops formation

- 11-й армейский корпус
- Sleeve patch of the 11th Army Corps
- Active: 1 April 2016 – present
- Country: Russian Federation
- Branch: Russian Ground Forces
- Type: Army Corps
- Size: 12,000 troops, 100 T-72 tanks
- Part of: Leningrad Military District
- Corps HQ: Gusev, Kaliningrad Oblast
- Engagements: Russo-Ukrainian War: 2024 Kharkiv offensive; Kupiansk offensive

Commanders
- Current commander: Major General Andrey Ruzinsky

The 11th Army Corps (Russian: 11-й армейский корпус, romanized: 11-y Armeyskiy Korpus) is a tactical formation of the Russian Ground Forces, formed in 2016 as part of the Coastal Troops of the Baltic Fleet, currently in the Leningrad Military District.

The corps is located in Kaliningrad Oblast, with its headquarters in the city of Gusev.

The corps was formed on 1 April 2016, and operates from Kaliningrad Oblast. Its first commander was Yuri Yarovitsky.

On 1 February 2021 the revival of the 75th Guards Motor Rifle Regiment at Sovetsk (until 1946 - the city of Tilsit), formerly part of the 40th Guards Tank Division, was reported. It was reported that the new regiment would form part of the newly forming motor rifle division of the 11th Army Corps, likely a revived 1st Guards Motor Rifle Division. Sovetsk is located on the banks of the Neman River on the border with Lithuania, where the shortest land route to the border with the main part of Russia begins.

In 2024 the Сorps was transferred to the newly formed Leningrad Military District.

The Corps included an artillery brigade (with BM-27 Uragan and BM-30 Smerch heavy rocket launchers), missile and motor rifle brigades, and regiments for tanks, motor rifle and air defense.

== Military actions ==
After 24 February 2022, the corps was committed to the Russian invasion of Ukraine. On 26 October 2022, Reuters published a special report regarding the defeat and retreat of an 11th Army detachment under colonel Ivan Popov and thousands of documents left in a base in Balakliia after the Ukrainian eastern Kharkiv counteroffensive 6–8 September. According to the documents, units within the corps had suffered heavy losses around Balakliia. In an action near Hrakove on 19 July, thirty-nine men were wounded, seven were dead, and 17 were reported missing, with a tank and two APCs lost. Meanwhile, on 24 July, 12 marines were killed in a HIMARS strike. By 30 August, the corps was down to 71% of its authorized strength, although more draftees were ordered. Some units were even worse off. The 2nd Assault Battalion had 49 personnel, when it should have had 240. The 9th BARS Brigade, an irregular unit, was at 23% of its intended manpower.

In October 2022 American military correspondent David Axe claimed that the 11th Army Corps was destroyed during the 2022 Kharkiv counteroffensive, having lost half its troops and 200 vehicles, and would "almost certainly require many months to rest, re-equip and induct draftees in order to regain even a fraction of its former strength."

In May 2024, it was reported that the 11th Army Corps was taking part in the 2024 Kharkiv offensive.

On 16 May, the Ukrainians claimed that two of the 11th Corps’ combat formations, deployed to the Kharkiv sector, the 138th Motor Rifle Brigade and 7th Separate Motor Rifle Regiment – part of the 18th Motor Rifle Division – took 70 percent losses in less than two weeks and had been rendered "combat ineffective".

== Structure ==
- Headquarters Staff (Gusev) (MUN 54259)
- 18th Guards Motor Rifle Division (Gusev and Sovetsk)
  - 9th Motor Rifle Regiment
  - 79th Motor Rifle Regiment (MUN 90151)
  - 275th Motor Rifle Regiment
  - 280th Motor Rifle Regiment
  - 11th Tank Regiment (Gusev) (MUN 41611)
  - 20th Reconnaissance Battalion
  - Nº Artillery Regiment
  - Nº Engineer Battalion
  - Nº Communications Battalion
  - 26th Automobile Battalion
- 7th Guards Motor Rifle Regiment (Kaliningrad)
- 1427th Motor Rifle Regiment
- 1486th Motor Rifle Regiment
- 27th Coastal Missile Brigade
- 152nd Guards Rocket Brigade (Chernyakhovsk) The brigade traces its history back to the 3rd Destroyer (istrebitel'nye) Brigade of the 2nd Destroyer Division, in the combined-arms anti-tank role. The brigade's first action was at the Battle of Kursk. Twelve soldiers were awarded the Hero of the Soviet Union. The 3rd Destroyer Brigade was raised to Guards status on August 10, 1943, with the same original number retained. The formation was in the ranks of the Active Army (the troops fighting on the frontline) from June 12, 1942, to August 10, 1943, and from September 14, 1943, to May 9, 1945. In July–August 1943, it fought as part of the 70th Army at the Battle of Kursk. Initially, the unit was formed as the 3rd Destroyer Brigade. It then became the 3rd Guards Destroyer Brigade and was eventually reorganized in 1943 into the 3rd Guards Anti-Tank Artillery Brigade. After the war, the brigade was in the Group of Soviet Forces in Germany and reported directly to the command of the Group of Forces. The formation was stationed in the area of Strelitz-Alt (or Alt-Strelitz) (de:Strelitz-Alt / Altstrelitz) in Neustrelitz, Mecklenburg-Vorpommern in the German Democratic Republic. In the 1960s, the brigade was reorganized into a missile formation. In the late 1980s, in the process of disbanding the GSFG, the brigade (military unit 96759) was withdrawn to Chernyakhovsk, Kaliningrad Oblast.
- 244th Artillery Brigade (Kaliningrad)
- 22nd Independent Guards Anti-Aircraft Missile Regiment (Kaliningrad)
- 46th Independent Reconnaissance Battalion (Gusev)
- 40th Independent Command Battalion (Gusev)

== Commanders ==
- Major-General Yuri Yarovitsky (2016 - 2020)
- Major-General Andrey Ruzinsky (Since August 2020)
