= 14th Army Corps (Russian Federation) =

- 14-й армейский корпус
- Great emblem of the 14th Army Corps
- Active: 2017–present
- Country: Russian Federation
- Branch: Russian Ground Forces
- Type: Operational Formation
- Size: Army Corps
- Part of: Leningrad Military District
- Corps HQ: Murmansk
- Engagements: Russian invasion of Ukraine

Commanders
- Current commander: Major General Boris Fomichev

Insignia
- Sleeve patch

The 14th Army Corps (Russian: 14-й армейский корпус, romanized: 14-y Armeyskiy Korpus) is a tactical formation of the Russian Ground Forces formed in 2017 as part of the Northern Fleet's coastal defence troops, currently under direct control of the Leningrad Military District.

The corps is located in Murmansk Oblast, with its headquarters in the city of Murmansk.

== Formation ==
The corps was formed in April 2017, and is assigned to perform tasks in the Arctic. The corps consists of two Arctic motorized rifle brigades, whose personnel are trained in ski warfare, the use of reindeer and dog sleds, and the construction of igloos. The corps' service members deploy as part of the coastal troops of the Northern Military District. They take part in competitions of the Army-2020 exhibitions and carry out winter training at the battalion and divisional tactical levels with live-fire exercises.

Parts of the corps, notably its 200th Separate Motor Rifle Brigade and 80th Arctic Motor Rifle Brigade, took part in the Russian invasion of Ukraine. A unit of the corps was reported to be operating in the areas of Sumy, Okhtyrka, and Poltava in late February 2022.

On July 4, 2023, the newspaper Izvestia reported that the 14th Army Corps would be transformed into a new combined arms army with new motor rifle brigades, divisions and regiments. Additionally they reported that the 200th Separate Motor Rifle Brigade and 80th Arctic Motor Rifle Brigade will be merged to form a new motor rifle division, the first component of the new combined arms army. However, it is unclear where the Russian military leadership could find the personnel and equipment that would be needed for the new organization.

Its deputy commander Major General Vladimir Zavadsky was reportedly killed by a land mine in Ukraine in November 2023.

In 2024 the Сorps was transferred to the newly formed Leningrad Military District.

== Structure ==
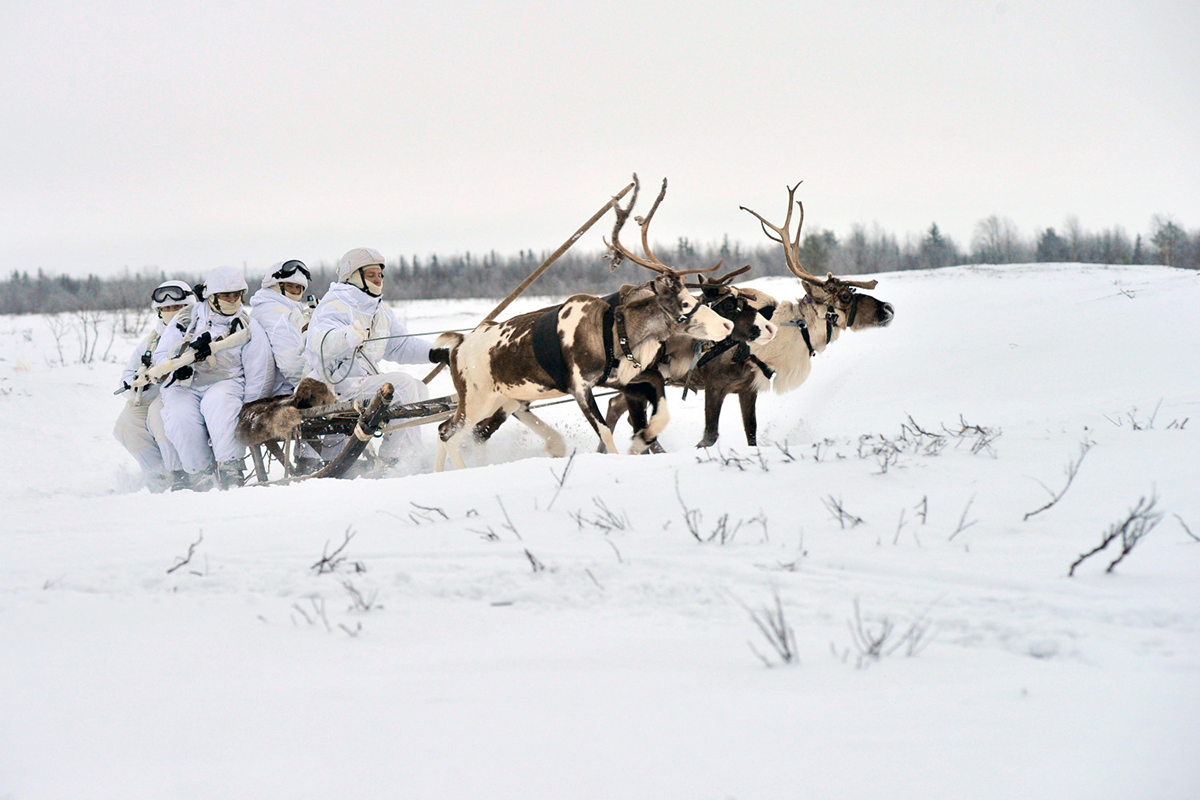
Troops of the corps' 80th Arctic Motor Rifle Brigade carry out exercises in January 2017

14th Army Corps (Murmansk)

- Headquarters staff (Severomorsk, Murmansk)
  - 80th Arctic Motor Rifle Brigade (Alakurtti)
  - 71st Guards Motor Rifle Division (Pechenga)
  - 58th Control Battalion (Murmansk)
  - 382nd Rocket Artillery Battalion
  - 104th Artillery Brigade

== Commanders ==
- Lieutenant-General Dmitry Krayev (2017 - 2022)
- Major General Boris Fomichev (2022–present)
