= Vladimir Zavadsky =

Russian general (1978–2023)

- Владимир Завадский
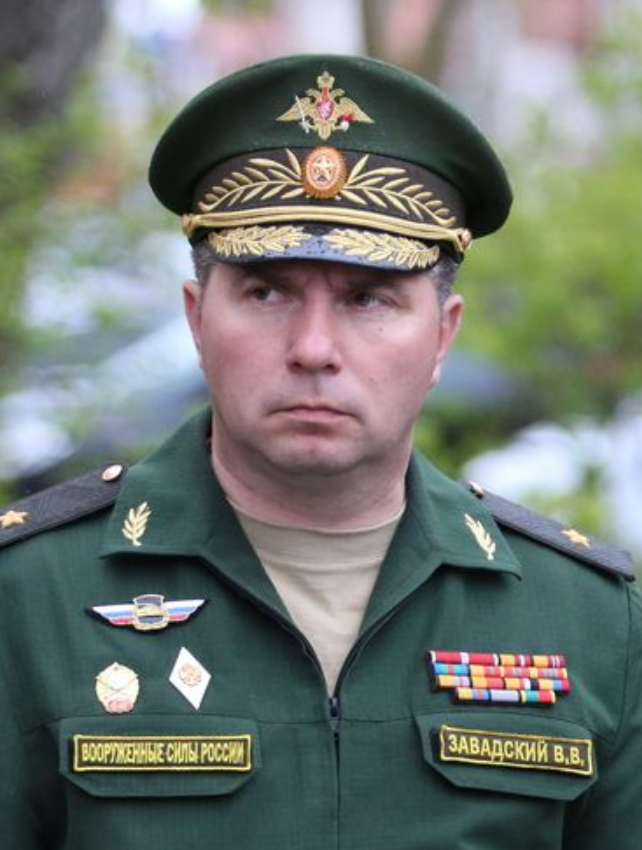
- Zavadsky in 2021
- Born: 11 January 1978; Novocherkassk, Russian SFSR, Soviet Union
- Died: 28 November 2023 (aged 45) near Izium, Kharkiv Oblast, Ukraine
- Cause of death: Landmine
- Alma mater: Moscow Higher Combined Arms Command School (2000); Combined Arms Academy of the Armed Forces of the Russian Federation (2010)
- Spouse: Oksana Vasilyevna Balashakova
- Children: 2
- Military career
- Allegiance: Russia
- Branch: Russian Ground Forces
- Service years: 2000–2023
- Rank: Major General
- Conflicts: Russo-Ukrainian War; Russian invasion of Ukraine †; 2022 Kharkiv counteroffensive
- Awards: Order of Courage; Order of Alexander Nevsky

Major General Vladimir Vasilyevich Zavadsky (Note: Russian: Владимир Васильевич Завадский) (11 January 1978 – 28 November 2023) was a Russian military officer who was the deputy commander of the 14th Army Corps of the Russian Navy. He was killed in Kharkiv Oblast during the Russian invasion of Ukraine, reportedly by a landmine.

== Biography ==
Zavadsky was originally from Rostov Oblast. He graduated from the Ulyanovsk Guards Suvorov Military School in 1995, then graduated from the Moscow Higher Combined Arms Command School in 2000. In 2010, he graduated from the Combined Arms Academy of the Armed Forces of the Russian Federation, and was honoured by then-Russian President Dmitry Medvedev.

In 2018, he was appointed as commander of the 4th Guards Tank Division (also known as the "Kantemirovsky Tank Division"), which he led until 2021.

Zavadsky took part in the Russian invasion of Ukraine that began in 2022 as the deputy commander of the 14th Army Corps of the Russian Navy. According to Ukrainian analysts, Zavadsky was wounded during his flight from Izium during Ukraine's 2022 Kharkiv counteroffensive.

Lenta.ru reported that Zavadsky was killed near Izium in Kharkiv Oblast on 28 November 2023 by one of the Russian military's own landmines in Ukraine. Zavadsky may have driven a captured Ukrainian vehicle carrying three Russian officers into a minefield while escaping friendly fire from uninformed mortar teams, according to an unconfirmed source. The Russian Defence Ministry did not comment on the incident. The location of his death was not certain: the Kyiv Independent was skeptical that it was Izium, noting that the city was "dozens of kilometers" behind the front line in Ukrainian-controlled territory. The BBC suggested that Zavadsky's unit was stationed in Kherson Oblast during the incident. On 4 December, Voronezh Oblast governor Alexander Gusev confirmed Zavadsky had died "in the line of duty" in Ukraine, but did not elaborate on details.

== Personal life ==
Zavadsky was married to Oksana Vasilyevna Balashakova (born on 2 July 1973), and had sons, two of them who are Mikhail (born on 25 October 2011), and Dmitry (born on 31 July 2003). (Note: Two or three, according to different sources.)

== See also ==
- List of Russian generals killed during the Russian invasion of Ukraine
