= Grigory Karizhsky =

Grigory Ivanovich Karizhsky
- Karizhsky, 1960s
- Native name: Григорий Иванович Карижский
- Born: 21 November 1895; Fitinino village, Kamyshinsky Uyezd, Saratov Governorate, Russian Empire
- Died: 5 February 1971 (aged 75) Kyiv, Ukrainian SSR, Soviet Union
- Allegiance: Russian Empire (1915–17); Soviet Union (1918–58)
- Branch: Imperial Russian Army (1915–17); Red Army (Soviet Army from 1946) (1918–58)
- Service years: 1915–38; 1939–40; 1941–58
- Rank: Major general
- Commands: 18th Guards Rifle Division; 30th Guards Mechanized Division
- Conflicts: World War I; Russian Civil War; World War II; Gumbinnen Operation; East Prussian Offensive
- Awards: Hero of the Soviet Union; Order of Lenin (2); Order of the Red Banner (3); Order of Suvorov 2nd class

Grigory Ivanovich Karizhsky (Russian: Григорий Иванович Карижский; 21 November 1895 – 5 February 1971) was a Soviet Army Major general and Hero of the Soviet Union. In 1915, he was drafted into the Imperial Russian Army and graduated from warrant officer school before being demobilized after the October Revolution. Karizhsky joined the Red Army soon after and became a cavalry commander, fighting in the Russian Civil War. He eventually became a regimental commander by 1932, and was still in that position at the beginning of the Great Purge. In 1938 he was dismissed from the army and imprisoned but was reinstated in December 1939. He was rearrested a month later but reinstated in the spring of 1941. After Operation Barbarossa, Karizhsky became commander of the 32nd and then 202nd Airborne Brigades in the Far East. He was appointed 15th Army deputy commander, still in the Far East, in August 1942.

After graduating from tactical courses at the Military Academy of the General Staff Karizhsky became deputy commander of the 36th Rifle Corps in the 3rd Belorussian Front in September 1944. After participating in the Gumbinnen Operation he was given command of the 18th Guards Rifle Division and led it during the East Prussian Offensive and Battle of Königsberg. For his leadership, Karizhsky was awarded the title Hero of the Soviet Union. After the war the division became the 30th Guards Mechanized Division. Karizhsky continued to serve postwar and held various staff posts. He retired in 1958 and lived in Kiev until his death in 1971.

== Early life, World War I and Russian Civil War ==
Karizhsky was born on 21 November 1895 on the Fitinino farm in Saratov Governorate to a peasant family. He graduated from 6th grade. He was drafted into the Imperial Russian Army in May 1915 and graduated from warrant officer school in 1917.

He joined the Red Army in February 1918 and became assistant commander of the Kamyshin Revolutionary Committee. In April 1918 he became a company commander of the Kamyshin Vsevobuch, In September 1918, he became a company commander in the 1st Separate Tsaritsyn Cavalry Squadron. Karizhsky became a squadron commander in the Kamyshin Cavalry Regiment in January 1919. Around this time he joined the Communist Party of the Soviet Union. He fought on the Southern Front of the Russian Civil War. In 1920 he was awarded the Order of the Red Banner for his actions.

== Interwar ==
In March 1921, Karizhsky became assistant to the commander of the 5th Cavalry Division's 29th Cavalry Regiment. In 1922 he graduated from the Taganrog Higher Cavalry School and in 1924 the Leningrad Higher Cavalry School. In June 1924 he became assistant supply officer for the division's 25th and 30th Cavalry Regiments. Karizhsky became chief of staff of the 76th and 92nd Cavalry Regiments in October 1927. Karizhsky was appointed commander of the 12th Cavalry Division's 88th Cavalry Regiment in December 1932. In February 1938, Karizhsky was dismissed from the army, arrested and imprisoned by the NKVD as part of the Great Purge. He was released and reinstated in December 1939 and appointed supply officer for the 18th Mountain Cavalry Division. In January 1940, only a month later, Karizhsky was dismissed and arrested again. He was released and reinstated in March 1941, becoming deputy commander of the 12th Rifle Division on the Far Eastern Front.

== World War II ==
In July 1941, Karizhsky became commander of the 32nd and then 202nd Airborne Brigade, still on the Far Eastern Front. In August 1942, he became deputy commander of the 15th Army. On 1 October, he was promoted to Major general. He graduated from tactical courses taken between May and August 1944 at the Military Academy of the General Staff. In August 1944 Karizhsky was sent to the front. In September, he became deputy commander of the 36th Rifle Corps and fought in the Gumbinnen Operation. On 3 November he was awarded a second Order of the Red Banner. Between 13 November and 1 December he was acting corps commander. He was given command of the 18th Guards Rifle Division soon after. In January 1945, the division helped captured Insterburg. On 21 February, Karizhsky was awarded his first Order of Lenin. In April, the division helped capture Königsberg, reportedly capturing several thousand German troops. On 19 April, he was awarded the Order of Suvorov 2nd class. For his leadership, Karizhsky was awarded the title Hero of the Soviet Union and the Order of Lenin on 5 May 1945. During later battles, the division was reportedly among the first to reach the Vistula Lagoon and captured Brandenburg. The division fought in the Samland Offensive and the attack on the Vistula Spit.

== Postwar ==
In December 1945, the division became the 30th Guards Mechanized Division in Kaliningrad. In 1948, Karizhsky completed graduate courses at the Military Armored Forces Academy. On 17 May 1951 he was awarded a third Order of the Red Banner. In March 1955, he became assistant commander of the 6th Army and head of combat training at the headquarters. In March 1957, he became deputy commander of the 6th Army for combat training. Karizhsky retired in July 1958 and lived in Kiev. On 28 October 1967, Karizhsky was awarded the Order of the Red Star. He died on 5 February 1971 and was buried in the Darnitsa Cemetery.

== Awards and honors ==
Hero of the Soviet Union (5 May 1945)
Order of Lenin, twice (21 February 1945, 5 May 1945)
Order of the Red Banner, four times (October 1921, 3 November 1944, 17 May 1951)
Order of Suvorov, 2nd class (19 April 1945)
Order of Kutuzov, 2nd class (16 May 1944)
Order of the Red Star (28 October 1967)
Medal "For the Capture of Königsberg" (1945)
Medal "For the Victory over Germany in the Great Patriotic War 1941–1945" (1945)
Jubilee Medal "Twenty Years of Victory in the Great Patriotic War 1941-1945" (1965)
Jubilee Medal "Thirty Years of Victory in the Great Patriotic War 1941–1945" (1975)
Jubilee Medal "In Commemoration of the 100th Anniversary of the Birth of Vladimir Ilyich Lenin" (1969)
Jubilee Medal "30 Years of the Soviet Army and Navy" (1948)
Jubilee Medal "40 Years of the Armed Forces of the USSR" (1958)
Jubilee Medal "50 Years of the Armed Forces of the USSR" (1968)

A street in Chernyakhovsk was named after Karizhsky.
