= 244th Artillery Brigade =

244th Neman Red Banner, Orders of Suvorov and Kutuzov Artillery Brigade
- 244-я артиллерийская Неманская Краснознамённая, орденов Суворова и Кутузова бригада
- Emblem of the 244th Artillery Brigade
- Active: 1941–Present
- Country: Soviet Union (until 1991); Russia
- Branch: Soviet Navy (until 1991); Russian Navy
- Type: Artillery
- Size: Brigade
- Part of: 11th Army Corps
- Garrison/HQ: Kaliningrad
- Nickname: Nemanskaya
- Equipment: 2A36 Giatsint-B, BM-27 Uragan, 9P157-2 Khrizantema-S
- Decorations: Order of the Red Banner; Order of Suvorov 2nd Class; Order of Kutuzov 2nd Class
- Honorifics: Neman

The 244th Neman Red Banner, Orders of Suvorov and Kutuzov Artillery Brigade (Military Unit Number 41603) is an artillery formation of the Coastal Troops of the Russian Navy, currently based in Kaliningrad, Kaliningrad Oblast. It is part of the 11th Army Corps, the coastal forces of the Baltic Fleet.

The brigade traces its history to the 551st artillery regiment of Ant-Tank Defence (PTO) of the Reserve of the Supreme High Command (RVGK). The regiment was formed on August 10, 1941, at Podolsk in Moscow Oblast, at the Podolsk artillery school. During the war it served with the 49th, 33rd, and 11th Guards Armies.
