= 18th Guards Motor Rifle Division =

Division of the Russian Ground Forces

133rd Rifle Division (I Formation) (1939–1942) 18th Guards Rifle Division (1942–1945) 30th Guards Mechanised Division (1945–1965) 18th Guards Motor Rifle Division (1965 – c. 2001, 2020 – present)
- 18-я гвардейская мотострелковая Инстербургская Краснознамённая, ордена Суворова дивизия
- Sleeve patch of the 18th Guards Motor Rifle Division
- Active: 1939–present
- Country: Soviet Union (until 1991); Russia (1991–2001; 2020–)
- Branch: Soviet Army (until 1991); Russian Ground Forces (1991–2001; 2020–)
- Type: Mechanized infantry
- Size: Division
- Part of: Leningrad Military District; 11th Army Corps, Baltic Fleet
- Garrison/HQ: Gusev and Sovetsk
- Engagements: World War II; Battle of Moscow; East Prussian Offensive; Russo-Ukrainian War; 2024 Kharkiv offensive
- Decorations: Order of the Red Banner; Order of Suvorov, 2nd class
- Battle honours: Insterburg

Commanders
- Notable commanders: Grigory Karizhsky

The 18th Guards Insterburg Red Banner Order of Suvorov Motor Rifle Division (Russian: 18-я гвардейская мотострелковая Инстербургская Краснознамённая, ордена Суворова дивизия, romanized: 18-ya gvardeyskaya motostrelkovaya Insterburgskaya Krasnoznamonnaya, ordena Suvorova diviziya), is an active division of the Russian Ground Forces.

== History ==
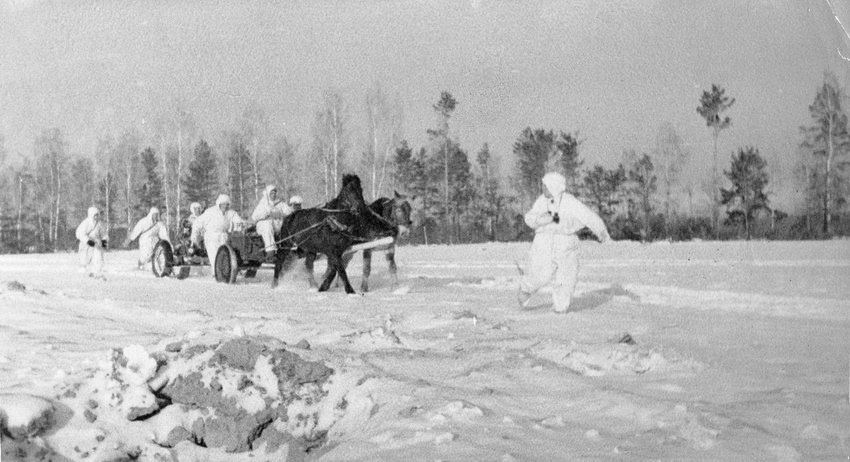
Gun crew of 51st Guards Rifle Regiment Senior Sergeant Grigory Chichev moving their 45 mm anti-tank gun to the frontline, 1943

The 18th Guards Motor Rifle Division was formed originally as the 133rd Rifle Division at Novosibirsk in 1939. The division was part of 1st Shock Army on 1 December 1941 during the Battle of Moscow. It was redesignated as the 18th Guards Rifle Division in March 1942 with the 51st, 53rd, 58th Guards Rifle Regiments and 52nd Guards Artillery Regiment. The division fought in the East Prussian Offensive. The unit became 30th Guards Mechanised Division in 1945 as part of the 11th Guards Army. In 1965 it was renumbered as 18th Guards Motor Rifle Division. It was stationed in the Kaliningrad enclave with 11th Guards Army before entering Czechoslovakia in 1968, joining the Central Group of Forces.

In 1991 the division was withdrawn back to Gusev, Kaliningrad Oblast. The division was reorganised as a cadre strength formation, as part of the third-line reserves of the Russian Ground Forces. In 2002, it became the 79th Separate Guards Motor Rifle Brigade (Russian: 79-я отдельная гвардейская мотострелковая бригада). The division was reformed from the 79th Separate Guards Motor Rifle Brigade in Kaliningrad in December 2020 as part of the 11th Army Corps. In 2022, elements of the division were reportedly heavily engaged in combat in from the start of the invasion of Ukraine.

== Structure ==
=== Structure (1990s) ===
- 210th Motor Rifle Regiment;
- 275th Guards Motor Rifle Regiment;
- 278th Guards Motor Rifle Regiment;
- 280th Guards Motor Rifle Regiment;
- 52nd Guards Artillery Regiment

Honorifics are Insterburgskaya Krasnoznamennaya and Order of Suvorov.

=== Structure (2020/21) ===
- 275th Motor Rifle Regiment
- 280th Motor Rifle Regiment
- 79th Guards Motor Rifle Regiment (former 79th Separate Guards Motor Rifle Brigade re-formed as a regiment)
- 11th Separate Tank Regiment (Gusev, Kaliningrad Oblast) (Military Unit Number V/Ch (в/ч) 41611) (Equipped with T-72B Main Battle Tanks (upgrades of T-72s to B3M-standard underway as of 2019/20)
- 20th Separate Reconnaissance Battalion (forming 2020/21; Orlan-10 UAVs and "Sobolyatnik" and "Fara-VR" reconnaissance radars)
- 22nd Guards Anti-Aircraft Missile Regiment (Tor M1/M2), in Kaliningrad
