= Divizion =

Battalion-sized unit in Slavic-speaking militaries

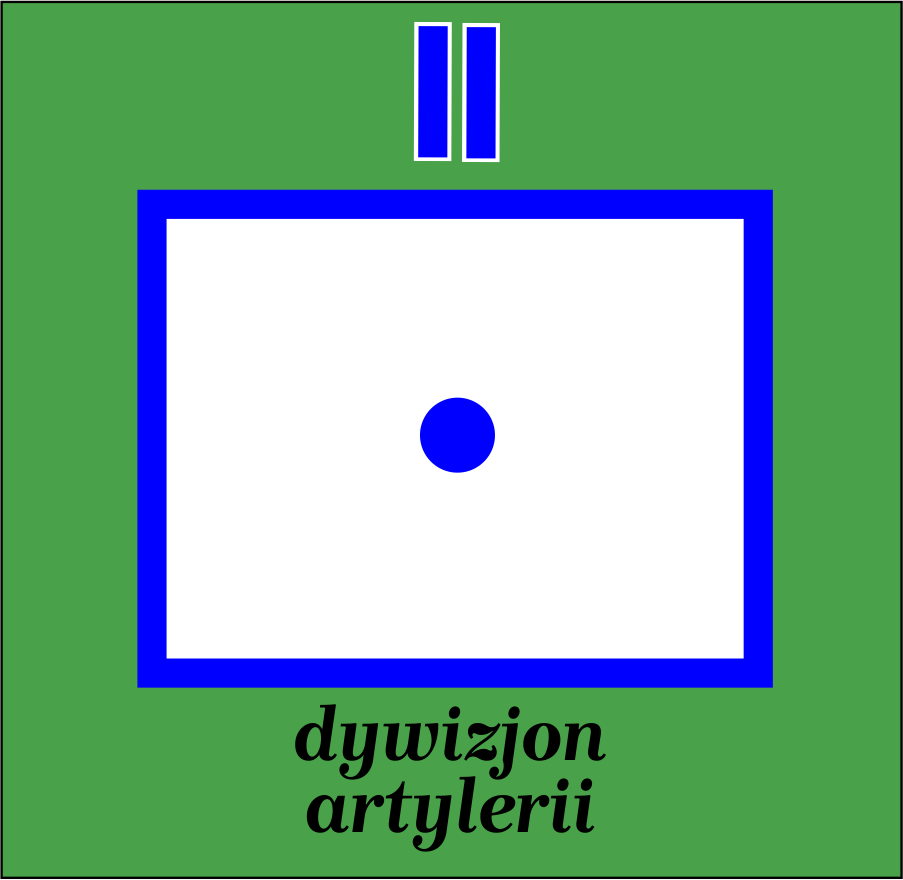
A dywizjon insignia

A divizion (dywizjon) (a word in several European languages, mostly Slavic) is a military unit in some armed branches, usually artillery and cavalry, being an equivalent of battalion. It should be distinguished from division, which is a larger formation. The same word is used in some of these languages for a group of naval vessels (a division in naval usage).

== Usage ==
- Russia / USSR: divizion (дивизион) is an artillery (also anti-aircraft and surface-to-air missile artillery) battalion or half-regiment of cavalry, and also a group of naval vessels. It was also used in relation to air force units and armoured train units. An equivalent of a division is divizya (дивизия) in Russian.
- Poland: dywizjon is an artillery or cavalry battalion, including armoured cavalry, and also a group of naval vessels and armoured train units. (An equivalent of a division is dywizja in Polish). During World War II, Polish military aviation used a system in which the smallest independent air unit was the eskadra (approx. 10 aircraft). Two eskadry formed the dywizjon (so it was the equivalent of the British squadron, e.g. "dywizjon 303" - "No. 303 Squadron" in RAF).
- Yugoslavia and successor countries: term divizion or дивизион (also spelled "divizijun") is used instead of battalion in artillery and anti-aircraft artillery branch but also for naval units of battalion, regiment or brigade size. The Croatian Army at some point stopped using term "divizijun" in artillery and anti-aircraft artillery and the same term as in other branches is used instead ("bojna" i.e. "battalion"). The term "divizijun" is still used in the Croatian Navy and is the equivalent of a non-commonwealth regiment. (An equivalent of the English term "division" is divizija or дивизија in Serbo-Croatian.)
- Bulgaria: divizion (дивизион) is an artillery or rocket artillery battalion, and also a group of naval vessels. (An equivalent of a division is divizya (дивизия) in Bulgarian.)
- Ukraine: divizion (дивізіон) is also an artillery or rocket artillery battalion equivalent, and also a group of naval vessels. (An equivalent of a division is divizya (Дивізія) in Ukrainian.)
