= Postoyalye Dvory =

Rural locality in Kursk Oblast, Russia

Postoyalye Dvory Постоялые Дворы
- Village
- Interactive map of Postoyalye Dvory
- Location of Postoyalye Dvory Postoyalye Dvory (Kursk Oblast)
- Coordinates: 51°47′20″N 36°27′10″E
- Country: Russia
- Federal subject: Kursk Oblast
- Administrative district: Kursky District
- SelsovietSelsoviet: Vinnikovsky

Population (2010 Census)
  - Total: 74
  - Estimate (2010): 74 (0%)

Municipal status
  - Municipal district: Kursky Municipal District
  - Rural settlement: Vinnikovsky Selsoviet Rural Settlement
- Time zone: UTC+3 (MSK)
- Postal code: 305510
- Dialing code: +7 4712
- OKTMO ID: 38620420141
- Website: vinnikovo.rkursk.ru

Postoyalye Dvory (Russian: Постоялые Дворы) is a rural locality (Russian: деревня, lit. 'village') in Vinnikovsky Selsoviet Rural Settlement, Kursky District, Kursk Oblast, Russia. Population: 74 (2010 census); 81 (2002 census);

== Geography ==
The village is located 110 km from the Russia–Ukraine border, 11 km north-east of the district center – the town Kursk, 3.5 km from the selsoviet center – 1st Vinnikovo.

Climate

Postoyalye Dvory has a warm-summer humid continental climate (Dfb in the Köppen climate classification).

== Transport ==
Postoyalye Dvory is located 7 km from the federal route P-298 (Kursk – Voronezh – P-22 "Kaspy" Highway; a part of the European route E38), on the road of regional importance 38K-016 (Kursk – Kastornoye), 1 km from the nearest railway halt 18 km (railway line Kursk – 146 km).

The rural locality is situated 12 km from Kursk Vostochny Airport, 126 km from Belgorod International Airport and 191 km from Voronezh Peter the Great Airport.

== Military staging area ==
Postoyalye Dvory is a "known training area" for the Russian Ground Forces, and saw "significant expansion" before the Russian invasion of Ukraine. According to the Security Service of Ukraine, the area had about 3000 Russian soldiers and 80 units of "military equipment" in late 2023.
