= 2nd Air Defence Division (Russia) =

Russian Aerospace Forces formation

2nd Air Defense Division (2014–present) 2nd Aerospace Defense Brigade (2013–2014) 2nd Air Defense Brigade (2009–2013) 54th Air Defence Corps (1986–2009)
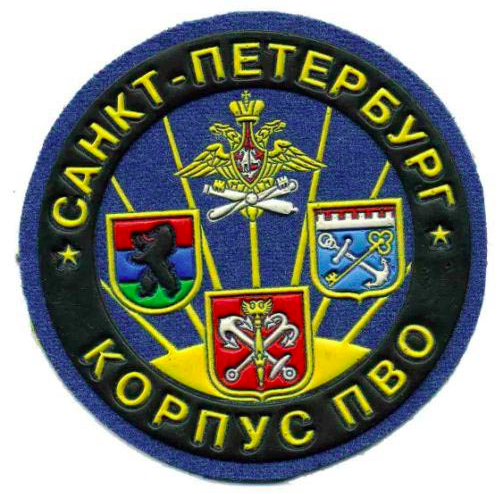
- 54th Air Defense Corps insignia
- Active: 1986–present
- Country: Soviet Union; Russia
- Branch: Soviet Air Defence Forces; Russian Aerospace Defence Forces; Russian Aerospace Forces
- Type: Air defence
- Part of: 6th Air and Air Defense Forces Army
- Garrison/HQ: Khvoyny

The 2nd Air Defense Division is an air defence military formation of the Russian Aerospace Forces. It was previously the 54th Air Defence Corps (Russian: 54-й корпус ПВО), a corps both of the Soviet Air Defence Forces and later the Russian Aerospace Forces.

Formed in 1986, the corps served as part of the 6th Independent Air Defense Army and then the 6th Air and Air Defense Forces Army from 1998. It was headquartered near Leningrad and controlled both interceptor and surface-to-air missile units. It was reorganized into the 2nd Air Defense Brigade in 2009, the 2nd Aerospace Defense Brigade in 2013, and the 2nd Air Defense Division in 2014.

== History ==
=== Cold War ===
The 54th Air Defense Corps was formed in the spring of 1986 after the 18th Air Defense Corps was expanded into the 6th Independent Air Defense Army in a return to the organizational system of the 1960s and 1970s. It was headquartered in the village of Khvoyny near Taytsy, the former headquarters of the 18th Corps. It included two interceptor fighter aviation regiments: the MiG-31-equipped 180th Guards at Gromovo, and the MiG-23-equipped 177th at Lodeynoye Pole. The corps also included five surface-to-air missile-armed anti-aircraft rocket brigades: the 83rd at Zelenogorsk-4, the 82nd at Gostilitsy near Lomonosov, the 84th at Vaganovo, the 86th at Stekelyanny near Ulyanovka (Sablino), and the 204th Guards at Korstovo, Kingiseppsky District. Five anti-aircraft rocket regiments were also a part of the corps: the 169th Guards at Kornevo near Vsevolozhsk, the 219th at Pervomayskoye-1, the 341st at Lopukhinka-2 near Gostilitsy, the 555th at Ostrov-2 (Tishino), and the 967th at Tikhvin. The 46th Radio-Technical Brigade at Khvoyny provided radar coverage for the corps.

On 28 May 1987, the forces of the corps were alerted when Mathias Rust's aircraft appeared on Soviet radar. The commanders of three battalions from the 204th Brigade reported that they were tracking the aircraft and were ready to launch missiles, but they were not given permission to fire, and Rust slipped through the air defense system.

=== Russian service ===
The 219th, 341st, and 967th Regiments were disbanded in 1993. On 15 February of that year, the 169th Guards Regiment was disbanded and its lineage transferred to the 86th Brigade, which briefly became the 157th Guards Anti-Aircraft Rocket Brigade and in 1994 was redesignated the 1490th Guards Anti-Aircraft Rocket Regiment. In 1994, the 204th Brigade was reorganized as the 1491st Guards Anti-Aircraft Rocket Regiment, and after it was disbanded in 1998 its lineage transferred to the 1489th Regiment, the former 84th Brigade, which became the 1489th Guards. Also in 1994, the 83rd Brigade became the 1488th Regiment, and around the same time the 82nd Brigade combined with the 158th Guards Anti-Aircraft Rocket Brigade, relocated from Latvia, to become the 500th Guards Anti-Aircraft Rocket Regiment.

On 1 June 1998, the 6th Independent Air Defense Army merged with the 76th Air Army to form the 6th Air and Air Defense Forces Army. The corps became part of the combined unit. The 159th Guards Fighter Aviation Regiment at Besovets joined the corps by 2000. On 1 July 2002, the 180th Guards Fighter Aviation Regiment was disbanded. In 2006, the 141st Anti-Aircraft Rocket Brigade at Nenimyaki was transferred from the Ground Forces to the corps and became the 1544th Anti-Aircraft Rocket Regiment, subsequently relocated to Vladimirsky Lager. In 2008, the 170th Radio-Technical Brigade at Petrozavodsk, previously transferred to the corps, was reorganized as the 334th Radio-Technical Regiment.

In 2009, the corps was converted into the 2nd Air Defense Brigade as part of the reform of the Russian Air Forces, and became part of the 1st Air and Air Defense Forces Command. At the same time, the 46th Brigade was converted into the 333rd Radio-Technical Regiment. The 159th Guards and the 177th Fighter Aviation Regiments were disbanded as part of the reforms, leaving the new brigade with no interceptor units. The air defense brigade became the 2nd Aerospace Defense Brigade in 2013 and was reorganized as the 2nd Red Banner Air Defense Division in 2014. In 2015 it became part of the 6th Air and Air Defense Forces Army when the latter was reformed.
