= 6th Guards Air and Air Defence Forces Army =

6th Guards Leningrad Red Banner, Order of Zhukov Army of Air and Air Defence Forces (1998–2009; 2015–present) 6th Independent Air Defence Army (1960?–1998)
- 6-я гвардейская Ленинградская Краснознаменная, ордена Жукова армия военно-воздушных сил и противовоздушной обороны
- Great emblem of the 6th Air and Air Defence Forces Army
- Active: 1960–1980; 1986–2009; 2015–present
- Country: Russia
- Branch: Russian Air Force
- Type: Air army
- Role: Air support and air defence
- Headquarters: Saint Petersburg
- Nickname: Army of the "Road of Life"
- Motto: "Securely guarding the North-West sky of Russia" (Russian: "Надежно охраняем небо Северо-Запада России")
- Equipment: Interceptors, multiple integrated SAM systems
- Engagements: Siege of Leningrad; Wagner Group rebellion
- Decorations: Guards; Order of the Red Banner; Order of Zhukov
- Honorifics: Leningrad

Commanders
- Current commander: Major General Oleg Makovetskiy

Insignia
- Sleeve patch of the 6th Air and Air Defence Forces Army

Aircraft flown
- Bomber: Su-24, Su-34
- Fighter: Su-27, Su-35, Su-30, Su-27
- Helicopter: Mi-8, Mi-24
- Interceptor: MiG-31
- Reconnaissance: Su-24MR
- Transport: An-12, An-26, Mi-8, Tu-134;

The 6th Guards Leningrad Red Banner, Order of Zhukov Army of Air and Air Defence Forces (Russian: 6-я гвардейская Ленинградская Краснознаменная, ордена Жукова армия военно-воздушных сил и противовоздушной обороны) is an Air Army of the Russian Aerospace Forces.

The army was first active from 1998 to 2009, and was reformed in 2015. After the war, the Soviet Air Defence Forces' main command in the Leningrad area from 1960 was the 6th Independent Air Defence Army. As of 2020 it is the principal frontal aviation formation within the Western Military District of the Russian Armed Forces.

== History ==
=== Origins ===
The army traces its lineage back to the formation of the 2nd Air Defence Corps before Operation Barbarossa, the World War II German invasion of the Soviet Union in June 1941. The corps provided direct cover for the city, and the Air Forces of the Leningrad Military District had two fighter aviation divisions for air defense, which became the 7th Fighter Aviation Corps in July. In November, the 2nd Corps was reorganized into the Leningrad Air Defence Corps Region, but on April 5, 1942, it became the Leningrad Air Defence Army. During the Siege of Leningrad between 1941 and 1944, the air defence formations protecting the city claimed more than 1,500 German aircraft destroyed, and covered the Road of Life across Lake Ladoga. In the fall of 1945, after the end of the war, the army was reorganized into the 16th Special Air Defence Corps, which was redesignated the 16th Air Defence Corps in May 1946 and the 16th Anti-Aircraft Artillery Corps PVO in July 1947. In early 1949, the headquarters of the Leningrad Air Defence Region was formed from the corps headquarters. In August, its anti-aircraft artillery divisions conducted an exercise in which they practiced repelling a large enemy air raid.

The region was an air defence region of the 2nd category, and in the spring of 1954 became 1st category, tasked with providing air defense for Leningrad and the Leningrad Military District. On May 1, 1953, it included four fighter aviation divisions part of the 25th Fighter Air Defence Army (the 20th, 41st, 44th, and the 50th), three anti-aircraft artillery divisions (the 25th, 29th, and the 42nd), a separate anti-aircraft artillery regiment, and seven separate anti-aircraft artillery battalions. These numbered 33,200 men, 256 fighter aircraft, 950 anti-aircraft guns (including 261 light guns), and 52 radars. In June 1954, the region was reorganized into the Special Leningrad Air Defence Army, and the 25th Fighter Army abolished with its divisions brought under the direct control of the new army.

When surface-to-air missiles were introduced into the Air Defence Forces between 1958 and 1959, four Air Defence Brigades of Special Designation were formed in the army: the 82nd, 83rd, 84th, and 86th, equipped with S-75 Dvina missiles. These brigades were planned to be controlled by a coordinated missile defence system forming a ring around Leningrad, known as the System-100 Missile Zone. Additionally, the S-75s were to be bolstered by three regiments of long-range multi-target Dal missiles (see ru:Даль_(зенитный_ракетный_комплекс)), whose formation began in the fall of 1960. The closed military townlet of Khvoyny was built to house the headquarters of the system.

In April 1959 General-lieutenant Dmitry Zherebin was appointed commander of the Special Leningrad Air Defence Army. He continued to command the army after its reorganization into the 6th Separate Air Defence Army in February 1961.

=== 6th Independent Air Defence Army ===
In March 1960, the 6th Independent Air Defence Army (6-я отдельная армия ПВО) was formed from the Special Leningrad Air Defence Army. It controlled air defence units in Leningrad Oblast, Pskov Oblast, and the Estonian Soviet Socialist Republic. Between 1961 and 1962, the aviation division headquarters were disbanded and their regiments directly subordinated to the army headquarters. The Dal missile program was cancelled in late 1962, and the SAM brigades instead equipped with the S-125 and S-200 missiles. In the spring of 1967, the System-100 Zone was abolished and its units directly subordinate to the army headquarters or the 14th Air Defence Division. On February 22, 1968, the army was awarded the Order of the Red Banner in honor of the 50th anniversary of the Soviet Army. In early 1978, the 14th Division was transferred to the Baltic Military District, and in the spring of 1980 the army was reorganized into the 18th Air Defence Corps with the transfer of its fighter units to the Air Forces of the Leningrad Military District. The army was composed of regiments of interceptors and anti-aircraft missiles. It had two major tasks: to protect the most industrialized European part of the Soviet Union against possible U.S. cruise missile attack from the north via the North Pole (using Mikoyan MiG-31 interceptors), and to protect the deployment of nuclear submarines stationed in the Kola Peninsula (using Su-27 fighters).

In early 1986, the PVO returned to the organization used during the 1960s and 1970s. As a result, in April 1986, the headquarters of the army was reestablished in Leningrad at 16 Baskov Pereulok from the headquarters of the 18th Corps. The army included the 27th Air Defence Corps at Riga, the new 54th Air Defence Corps with headquarters at Khvoyny, the 14th Air Defence Division at Tallinn, which included the 425th Fighter Aviation Regiment PVO (Haapsalu (Khaansalu), Estonian SSR), the 656th Fighter Aviation Regiment PVO at Tapa Airfield in Estonia with MiG-27MLDs from 1978 and the 498th Anti-Aircraft Rocket Training Brigade at Opochka.

In turn, the 27th Corps of the PVO consisted in 1988 of the:

- 54th Guards Fighter Aviation Regiment PVO (Vainode, Latvian SSR) (38 Sukhoi Su-27P / UB)
- 689th Guards Fighter Aviation Regiment PVO (Nivenskoye, Kaliningrad Oblast) (36 Sukhoi Su-27P / UB)
- 77th Anti-Aircraft Rocket Brigade (Ventspils, Latvian SSR)
- 85th Anti-Aircraft Rocket Brigade (Kaunas, Lithuanian SSR)
- 158th Guards Anti-Aircraft Rocket Brigade (Liepaya, Latvian SSR)
- 169th Guards Anti-Aircraft Rocket Brigade (Neman, Kaliningrad Oblast)
- 183rd Guards Anti-Aircraft Rocket Brigade (Gvardeysk, Kaliningrad Oblast)
- 205th Anti-Aircraft Rocket Brigade (Riga, Latvian SSR)
- 529th Anti-Aircraft Rocket Regiment (Ukmerge, Lithuanian SSR)
- 466th Anti-Aircraft Rocket Regiment (Vilnius, Lithuanian SSR)
- 80th Radio-Technical Brigade (Tukums, Latvian SSR)
- 81st Radio-Technical Brigade (Pereslavskoye, Kaliningrad Oblast)
- 5th Radio-Technical Regiment (Paplaka, Latvian SSR)

54th Air Defence Corps included:

- 177th Fighter Aviation Regiment PVO (Lodeynoye Pole, Leningrad Oblast) (38 Mikoyan-Gurevich MiG-23MLD)
- 180th Guards Fighter Aviation Regiment PVO at Gromovo-Sakkola, Leningrad Oblast) (31 Mikoyan MiG-31)
- 82nd Anti-Aircraft Rocket Brigade (Lomonosov, Leningrad Oblast)
- 83rd Anti-Aircraft Rocket Brigade (Zelenogorsk, Leningrad Oblast)
- 84th Anti-Aircraft Rocket Brigade (Vaganovo, Leningrad Oblast)
- 86th Anti-Aircraft Rocket Brigade (Tosno-2, Leningrad Oblast)
- 204th Guards Anti-Aircraft Rocket Brigade (Kerstovo, Leningrad Oblast)
- 169th Guards Anti-Aircraft Rocket Regiment (Kornevo, Leningrad Oblast)
- 219th Anti-Aircraft Rocket Regiment (Pervomayskoye-1)
- 341st Anti-Aircraft Rocket Regiment (Lopukhinka-2)
- 555th Anti-Aircraft Rocket Regiment (Ostrov-2)
- 967th Anti-Aircraft Rocket Regiment (Tikhvin)
- 46th Radio-Technical Brigade (Khvoyny)

=== Russian Air Force ===
The Army was reformed within the Russian Air Force on June 1, 1998, from the 76th Air Army of the VVS and the 6th Independent Air Defence Army, both headquartered in Saint Petersburg. Its new title was the 6th Army of Air Forces and Air Defence. The 6th Army had responsibility for the Leningrad Military District. General Lieutenant Gennady A. Torbov was appointed commander of the army by a presidential decree of April 6, 2000. He replaced Lt-Gen Anatoly Basov, who retired due to age. Its commanding officer was General Lieutenant Vladimir Sviridov from June 2005 until at least 2007.

Economic stringency and the reduction of the threat led to drastic cuts in the formation, as previously the 6th and 10th Independent Air Defence Armies, which covered the area, had twelve fighter regiments between them. 10th Independent Air Defence Army appears to have disbanded on December 1, 1994. The 518th Fighter Aviation Regiment at Talagi Airport disbanded in 1998. The 174th and 470th Guards Fighter Aviation Regiments, at Monchegorsk and Afrikanda air base, both disbanded on September 1, 2001. There was also formerly the 72nd Fighter Regiment at Amderma and the 641st Fighter Aviation Regiment at Rogachevo (Sukhoi Su-27s).

By a Decree of the President of Russia dated September 13, 2005, for mass heroism and courage, fortitude and courage shown by the personnel of the army during the Great Patriotic War to protect the skies of Leningrad, and given its merits in peacetime, the army was given the honorary name "Leningrad".

From 2001 to 2009, the Kilpyavr airfield was home to the 9th Guards Fighter Aviation Regiment, created on the basis of 941st Fighter Aviation Regiment, which had received all the regalia of the 470th Guards Fighter Aviation Regiment. In 2009, 9th Guards Fighter Aviation Regiment was transferred from Karelia to the Besovets airbase, where it was merged with the 159th and 177th Fighter Regiment airfields Besovets and Lodeynoye Pole, respectively.

In 2009 the army was disestablished and reorganised as the 1st Air and Air Defence Forces Command. Major General Aleksandr Duplinsky took command in February 2014; he was promoted to lieutenant general in February 2016.

On August 1, 2015, the army was reformed from the 1st Air and Air Defence Forces Command as the 6th Leningrad Air and Air Defence Forces Army.

On December 22, 2025, the army was awarded the Guards status.

On 12 November 2026, the Russian media outlet Fontanka said that a colonel chief navigator of the army had been killed in a car explosion in Saint Petersburg, reportedly with a remotely detonated device.

== Structure ==
=== Structure, 2007 ===
- Headquarters, 6th Army of Air Forces and Air Defence – Saint Petersburg
  - 21st Air Defence Corps – Severomorsk
    - 9th Guards Vilnius Fighter Aviation Regiment – HQ at Kilp-Yavr (Poliarnyi) – Su-27; (see ru:Гвардейский Виленский ордена Кутузова III степени истребительный авиационный полк). Formed March 18, 1943, as 63rd Guards Fighter Aviation Regiment.
    - 458th Fighter Aviation Regiment – HQ at Savatiya (Kotlas) – MiG-25U, MiG-31;
    - 531st Nevel-Berlin Guards Anti-Aircraft Rocket Regiment
    - 1528th Anti-Aircraft Rocket Regiment – Severodvinsk
    - 583rd Anti-Aircraft Rocket Regiment – Olenegorsk, Murmansk Oblast
    - 145th Radiotechnical Brigade – Arkhangelsk
    - 5th Radiotechnical Brigade – Dalny Zelentsy, Severomorsk
  - 54th Air Defence Corps – HQ at Taytsy
    - 177th Fighter Aviation Regiment – HQ at Lodeynoye Pole (air base) – Su-27;
    - 159th Guards Fighter Aviation Regiment – HQ at Besovets Airport – Su-27;
    - 196th Anti-Aircraft Rocket Regiment
    - ?th Anti-Aircraft Rocket Regiment
  - 149th Composite Aviation Division
    - 67th Bomber Aviation Regiment – HQ at Siverskiy-2 – Su-24;
    - 722nd Bomber Aviation Regiment – HQ at Smuravyevo (Gdov) – Su-24;
  - 98th Guards Reconnaissance Aviation Regiment – HQ at Monchegorsk (air base) – MiG-25RB/U, Su-24MR;
  - 87th Aviation Base – HQ at Levashevo – An-12, An-26, Mi-8, Tupolev Tu-134; (ex 138th Independent Composite Air Regiment)
  - Army Aviation Component
    - 147th Independent Helicopter Squadron of Electronic Warfare – HQ at Pushkin – Mi-8PPA;
    - 332nd Independent Helicopter Regiment for Battle Control – HQ at Pribylovo – Mi-8, Mi-24;
    - 85th Independent Helicopter Squadron – HQ at Alakurtti – Mi-8, Mi-24.
- 1080th Mixed Aviation Base (смешанная авиационная база) – Gromovo, Priozersky District, Leningrad Oblast – An-72, An-30, An-26, Mi-8,
- 714th Base for Reserve Helicopters – Kasimovo – Mi-8, Mi-24
- 396th Centre for Special and Physical Preparations – St Petersburg

=== Structure: 1st Air and Air Defence Forces Command, 2009–2015 ===
- 1st Air and Space Defence Brigade (with S-300PM, S-300PS) – Severomorsk
- 2nd Air and Space Defence Brigade (with S-300PM) – Khvoyny
- 6961st Air Base (Su-27, Su-27UB) – Besovets (Бесовец)
- 6964th Guards Vistula Red Banner Order of Kutuzov Air Base (with SU-24M, Su-24MP)— Monchegorsk (Мончегорск)
- 6965th Air Base (with Mi-8, Mi-24) – Vyazma (Вязьма)
- 7000th Guards Borisov-Pomerania Twice Red Banner Order of Suvorov Air Base (with SU-24M, Su-24MP, Su-34) – Voronezh

The 1st Air and Air Defence Forces Command was only active from 2009 to 2015.

=== Structure: 2019/2020 ===
6th Air and Air Defence Forces Army HQ (St.Petersburg):

- 105th Guards Composite Aviation Division (Voronezh)
  - 159th Guards Fighter Aviation Regiment (Petrozavodsk Airport, Karelia) (Two Squadrons: Su-35S)
  - 790th Fighter Aviation Regiment (Borisovsky Khotilovo (air base)) (Two Squadrons: MiG-31; One Squadron: Su-35)
  - 14th Guards Fighter Aviation Regiment (Kursk Vostochny Airport (Khalino)) (Two Squadrons: Su-30SM)
  - 47th Composite Aviation Regiment (Voronezh Malshevo (air base)) (Two Squadrons: Su-34)
  - 4th Reconnaissance Aviation Squadron (Shatalovo) (Su-24MR)
- Naval Aviation (drawn from 132nd Mixed Aviation Division – Kaliningrad)
  - 689th Guards Fighter Aviation Regiment (Kaliningrad Chkalovsk) (Two Squadrons: Sukhoi Su-27P – planned to re-equip with the Su-35)
  - 4th Independent Naval Attack Aviation Regiment (Chernyakhovsk (air base)) (One Squadron: Su-30SM; One Squadron: Su-24M)
- 2nd Air Defence Division (St. Petersburg region)
  - 1488th Anti-Aircraft Missile Regiment (Zelenogorsk – S-400 SAM system)
  - 1489th Anti-Aircraft Missile Regiment (Vaganovo – S-400/Pantsir SAM systems)
  - 1490th Anti-Aircraft Missile Regiment (Ulyanovka – S-400 SAMs)
  - 500th Anti-Aircraft Missile Regiment (Gostilitsy – S-400/Pantsir SAMs)
  - 1544th Anti-Aircraft Missile Regiment (Vladimirsky Lager – S-400 SAMs)
- 32nd Air Defence Division
  - 42nd Anti-Aircraft Missile Regiment (Izhitsy – S-300PM2 surface-to-air missile system)
  - 108th Anti-Aircraft Missile Regiment (Voronezh – S-300PM2 SAMs)
- 44th Air Defence Division of the Baltic Fleet (Kaliningrad region)
  - 183rd Anti-Aircraft Missile Regiment (Gvardeysk – S-400/S-300/Pantsir SAMs)
  - 1545th Anti-Aircraft Missile Regiment (Kruglovo – S-400 SAMs)

Also seemingly part of the army are the 15th Brigade of Army Aviation at the former Russian Naval Aviation base at Ostrov, the 332nd Independent Guards Helicopter Regiment (332-й отдельный гвардейский вертолётный полк, MUN 12633 (Pushkin, St. Petersburg, with 12 Mil Mi-28N, 10 Mil Mi-35M, and 12 Mil Мi-8MТV); and the 440th Independent Helicopter Regiment.

The 52nd Heavy Bomber Aviation Regiment (at Shaykovka air base equipped with Tupolev Tu-22M3 "Backfire" bombers) is also based within the boundaries of the Western Military District but is subordinate to the 22nd Guards Heavy Bomber Aviation Division of Russian Long Range Aviation.

== See also ==
- List of military airbases in Russia

== Notes ==
- Air Forces Monthly, July & August 2007 issues.
- GFSIS. "Russian Military Forces: Interactive Map".

== Sources ==
- Tsapayev, D.A.; Goremykin, Viktor (2014). Великая Отечественная: Комдивы. Военный биографический словарь [The Great Patriotic War: Division Commanders. Military Biographical Dictionary] (in Russian). Vol. 3. Moscow: Kuchkovo Pole. ISBN 978-5-9950-0382-3.
- Lenskii, A.G.; Tsybin, M.M. (2013). Советские Войска ПВО в последние годы Союза ССР. Часть 1 [Soviet Air Defense Forces in the last years of the USSR: Part 1] (in Russian). St. Petersburg: Info Ol. OCLC 861180616.
