= 4th Guards Anti-Aircraft Artillery Division =

8th Anti-Aircraft Artillery Division (November 1942 – 12 May 1944) 4th Guards Anti-Aircraft Artillery Division (12 May 1944 – 20 March 1958) 140th Guards Anti-Aircraft Artillery Brigade (20 March 1958 – 1961) 169th Guards Anti-Aircraft Rocket Regiment (1961 – 15 February 1993) 157th Guards Anti-Aircraft Rocket Brigade (15 February 1993 – 1994) 1490th Guards Anti-Aircraft Rocket Regiment (1994–present)
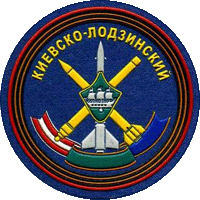
- Insignia of the 1490th Guards Anti-Aircraft Rocket Regiment
- Active: November 1942 – present
- Country: Soviet Union; Russia
- Branch: Red Army (Soviet Army from 1946); Soviet Air Defense Forces; Russian Air Force; Russian Aerospace Forces
- Type: Anti-Aircraft Artillery (Surface-to-air missile unit from 1961)
- Garrison/HQ: Ulyanovka; MUN 28037
- Engagements: World War II
- Decorations: Order of the Red Banner; Order of Kutuzov, 2nd class; Order of Bogdan Khmelnitsky, 2nd class
- Battle honours: Kiev; Łódź

Commanders
- Notable commanders: Ivan Kamensky

The 4th Guards Anti-Aircraft Artillery Division (Russian: 4-я гвардейская зенитная артиллерийская дивизия) was an anti-aircraft artillery division of the Soviet Union's Red Army during World War II and the Soviet Army during the early years of the Cold War.

Formed in November 1942 as the 8th Anti-Aircraft Artillery Division, the division was sent to the front in late April 1943, serving with the 1st Tank Army (later 1st Guards Tank Army) for most of the war. It fought in the Battle of Kursk, the Battle of the Dnieper, and the Battle of Kiev. For its actions in the latter the division received the honorific Kiev. For its actions in the Zhitomir–Berdichev Offensive the 8th was awarded the Order of the Red Banner. It received the Order of Bogdan Khmelnitsky for actions in the Proskurov–Chernovitsy Offensive and in May 1944 was converted into the 4th Guards Anti-Aircraft Artillery Division. In the final year of the war, the 4th Guards fought in the Lvov–Sandomierz Offensive and the Vistula–Oder Offensive, receiving the honorific Łódź and the Order of Kutuzov and ending the war in the Battle of Berlin.

Postwar, the division remained in eastern Germany with the army and was converted into the 140th Guards Anti-Aircraft Artillery Brigade in 1958. In 1961, it was withdrawn to the Leningrad Military District and reorganized as the 169th Guards Anti-Aircraft Rocket Regiment, equipped with surface-to-air missiles. In 1993 its lineage was transferred to another unit after disbandment and in 1994 it became the 1490th Guards Anti-Aircraft Rocket Regiment.

== World War II ==
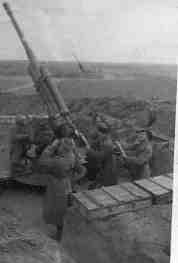
AA guns of the division in firing positions, November 1943

The 8th Anti-Aircraft Artillery Division RGK was formed at Moscow in November 1942. It was later relocated to Noginsk, and included three light AA gun-equipped regiments: the 797th, 848th, and the 991st. On 30 November, Lieutenant Colonel Savely Chapovsky was assigned as division commander. He was replaced by Lieutenant Colonel (promoted to colonel on 18 December) Ivan Kamensky, who led the division for the rest of the war, on 14 December. In February 1943, when anti-aircraft divisions were reorganized to include heavier guns, the 1063rd Anti-Aircraft Artillery Regiment joined the division. On 1 March, the 991st Regiment was renumbered as the 978th Regiment. At the end of April, the entire division was relocated to Oboyan, where it became part of the Voronezh Front. It was operationally subordinated to the 1st Tank Army, but its 797th Regiment was left behind to cover airfields of the 2nd Air Army in Oboyansky and Solntsevsky Districts. The division was part of the 1st Tank Army (redesignated the 1st Guards Tank Army on 25 April 1944) for the rest of the war, except for a brief period with the 38th Army in September and October.

During the Battle of Kursk, the 8th Division provided air defense for the 1st Tank Army in the area north and west of Belgorod, while the 797th Regiment covered the 2nd Air Army's airfields in the area of Solntsevo and Trubezh. The division's anti-aircraft gunners claimed 80 enemy aircraft in the battle. During the Battle of the Dnieper, the division provided air defense for the 38th Army in the capture of left-bank Ukraine. It then fought in the Battle of Kiev, and for its "courage and valor", the 8th was awarded the honorific Kiev on 6 November. During January and February 1944, the division provided anti-aircraft cover to the 1st Tank Army during the Zhitomir–Berdichev Offensive, attacking towards Vinnytsia, and in battles to destroy encircled German troops in the Belaya Tserkov area. On 9 February, the division received the Order of the Red Banner for "successful completion of combat missions" and "displaying courage and valor".

It then fought in the Proskurov–Chernovitsy Offensive, conducted during the spring rasputitsa, which made the roads impassable. The division participated in the capture of Chernovitsy, and was awarded the Order of Bogdan Khmelnitsky 2nd class on 8 April for its actions. For its "courage, valor, determination, and organization and skillful completion of combat tasks", the 8th Anti-Aircraft Artillery Division was converted into the 4th Guards Anti-Aircraft Artillery Division on 12 May. Its regiments became the 256th, 257th, 263rd, and 273rd Guards Anti-Aircraft Artillery Regiments. Four days later Kamensky was promoted to major general. In May and June it provided air defense for the 38th Army during the crossing of the Prut in the Kolomyia area. During the Lvov–Sandomierz Offensive in July and August, the division fought in the area of Stanislav, and defended the 1st Guards Tank Army from German air attack during the capture of Yaroslav and Peremyshl, the crossing of the Vistula, and the capture and expansion of the Sandomierz bridgehead.

In the Warsaw–Poznań Offensive of the larger Vistula–Oder Offensive, as part of the 1st Belorussian Front, the 4th Guards provided air cover for the attack of the 1st Guards Tank Army towards Łódź, Poznań, and Frankfurt an der Oder after breaking out of the Sandomierz bridgehead. For its "courage and valor", the division received the honorific Łódź on 12 February. On 5 April, the division was awarded the Order of Kutuzov 2nd class for "exemplary completion of combat assignments" during the advance into Brandenburg. During the month it provided anti-aircraft defense on the Oder near Göritz, and for the army in the Battle of Berlin. During street fighting in Berlin, 256th Guards Anti-Aircraft Regiment gun commander Sergeant Daniil Guba received the title Hero of the Soviet Union for downing multiple German aircraft with his AA gun and killing numerous German soldiers in ground combat. The division claimed 37 German aircraft in the latter, and the division's combat operations ended on 2 May in Berlin when the German garrison surrendered. During the war, the division claimed 338 enemy aircraft; it was thanked by Stavka eight times, and 3,500 soldiers of the division were decorated.

== Postwar ==
After the end of the war, the division was based at Königsbrück with the 1st Guards Tank Army, part of the Group of Soviet Forces in Germany. On 20 March 1958, it was reorganized as the 140th Guards Anti-Aircraft Artillery Brigade, and was withdrawn to the Leningrad Military District in 1961, where it was reorganized into the 169th Guards Anti-Aircraft Rocket Regiment at Vaskelovo, transferring to the Soviet Air Defense Forces. It initially included six S-125 SAM battalions, and was transferred to Uglovo in June 1964. Its S-125 battalions were transferred to the 83rd Anti-Aircraft Rocket Brigade, and the 169th took over five new S-200 battalions. In the early 1970s the regiment was reequipped with the S-200V, and in December 1972 it received the honorific named for the 50th anniversary of the Soviet Union. The regiment was part of the 18th Air Defense Corps of the 6th Air Defense Army. In March 1986 it transferred to the 54th Air Defense Corps, and in December 1987 it received the Ministry of Defense Pennant "For Courage and Valor". The 169th Regiment was disbanded on 15 February 1993 and its lineage transferred to the S-300PS-equipped 86th Anti-Aircraft Rocket Brigade at Tosno-2. The 86th became the 157th Guards Anti-Aircraft Rocket Brigade upon the transfer, and in the summer of 1994 was redesignated the 1490th Guards Anti-Aircraft Rocket Regiment.

In 2008, it was reported by Kommersant at Stekolnoye near Tosno with the 54th Air Defense Corps, still equipped with the S-300P. In 2009, it became part of the 2nd Air and Space Defense Brigade and around that time was relocated to Sablino in Ulyanovka as the 1490th Guards Anti-Aircraft Regiment (Military Unit Number 28037). In 2015, it became part of the 2nd Air Defense Division of the 6th Air and Air Defence Forces Army.
