= 82nd Anti-Aircraft Rocket Brigade =

- Active: 1960–1993
- Country: Soviet Union; Russia
- Branch: Soviet Air Defense Forces; Russian Air Defense Forces
- Type: Surface-to-air missile brigade
- Role: Air defense
- Part of: 54th Air Defense Corps (1986–1993)
- Garrison/HQ: Gostilitsy (near Lomonosov)
- Equipment: S-75 Dvina (1960–c. 1988); S-125 (1963–c. 1988); S-300PS (c. 1988–1993)

The 82nd Anti-Aircraft Rocket Brigade (Russian: 82-я зенитно-ракетная бригада, romanized: 82-ya zenitno-raketnaya brigada; Military Unit Number 03214) was a surface-to-air missile brigade of the Soviet Air Defense Forces and briefly the Russian Air Defense Forces.

Active from 1960, the brigade provided air defense for the Leningrad area with S-75 Dvina and S-125 missiles. It reequipped with S-300PS missiles in the late 1980s, and merged with a unit withdrawn from Latvia to become the 500th Guards Anti-Aircraft Rocket Regiment in 1993 and 1994.

== History ==
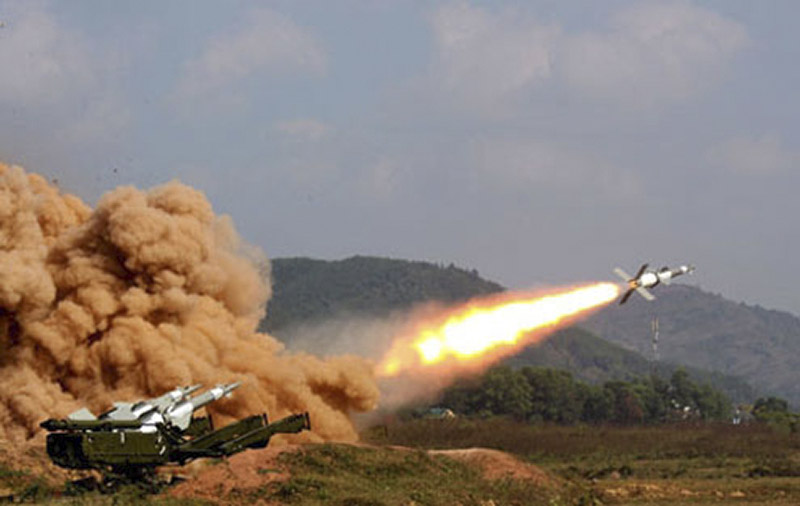
Launching of an S-125 of the type used by the brigade

The brigade was originally formed as the 82nd Air Defense Brigade of Special Designation, a unit of System-100, the Leningrad air defense missile system, in 1958. It was the fourth brigade of the system to be formed and was based at Gostilitsy, near Lomonosov. The brigade became operational with nine battalions of S-75 Dvina missiles, and was redesignated the 82nd Anti-Aircraft Rocket Brigade in August 1960. One of its battalions was stationed in Kronstadt near the Bychye Pole airfield. In 1963, the first S-125 battalion of the brigade became operational in Kronstadt, based near the city cemetery. The brigade eventually included seven S-125 battalions. In 1967, the brigade was directly subordinated to the 6th Independent Air Defense Army when the air defense missile system was abolished as an independent headquarters.

In 1986, the 86th became part of the 54th Air Defense Corps. It included fourteen S-75 and S-125 battalions by 1988, when it began replacing its S-75s and S-125s with the new S-300PS in two groups of battalions. Between 1993 and 1994, the 82nd was merged with the 158th Guards Anti-Aircraft Rocket Brigade, withdrawn from Latvia, to become the 500th Guards Anti-Aircraft Rocket Regiment.
