= 341st Anti-Aircraft Rocket Regiment =

- Active: 1963–1993
- Country: Soviet Union; Russia
- Branch: Soviet Air Defense Forces; Russian Air Defense Forces
- Type: Surface-to-air missile regiment
- Role: Air defense
- Part of: 54th Air Defense Corps (1986–1993)
- Garrison/HQ: Lopukhinkha-2
- Equipment: S-200V

The 341st Anti-Aircraft Rocket Regiment (Russian: 341-й зенитно-ракетный полк; Military Unit Number 25885) was a surface-to-air missile regiment of the Soviet Air Defense Forces during the Cold War which briefly became part of the Russian Air Defense Forces.

Active from 1963, the regiment provided air defense for the Leningrad area with S-200V missiles. It was disbanded in 1993 as a result of the introduction of the more modern S-300PS in the Leningrad air defense system.

== History ==
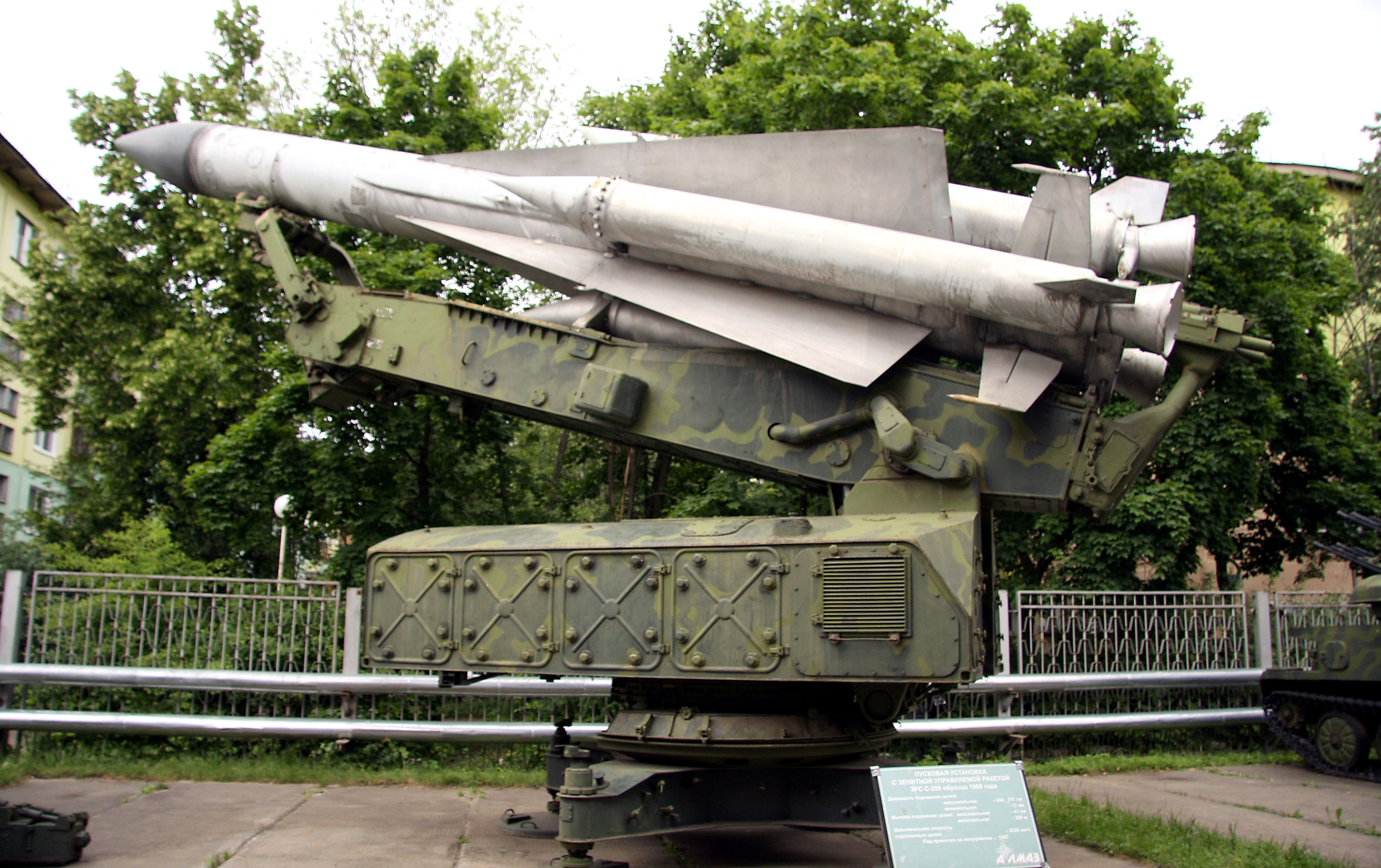
An S-200V of the type operated by the regiment

The regiment received its number, the 341st, in November 1963; it was a unit originally planned to be armed with the cancelled 5V11 Dal missile. The 341st was part of the 6th Independent Air Defense Army, and was based at Lopukhinka-2 near Gostilitsy. The regiment became operational in 1967 with five S-200 battalions. It was reequipped with the S-200V in the early 1970s. In 1974, its battalions were split into two groups of three and two battalions, respectively. In 1986, the 86th became part of the 54th Air Defense Corps. After the more modern S-300PS was introduced into the Leningrad air defense system, the S-200V units were gradually phased out. The 341st was disbanded in 1993.
