= 180th Guards Fighter Aviation Regiment PVO =

180th Guards Fighter Aviation Regiment PVO (1949–2002) 180th Guards Fighter Aviation Regiment (1944–1949) 181st Fighter Aviation Regiment (1941–1944)
- Active: 1941–2002
- Country: Soviet Union; Russia
- Branch: Soviet Air Forces; Soviet Air Defence Forces; Russian Air Defence Forces; Russian Air Force
- Type: Air defence
- Garrison/HQ: Gromovo
- Engagements: World War II
- Decorations: Order of the Red Banner
- Battle honours: Volgograd; Stalingrad (removed)

Commanders
- Notable commanders: Alexey Kostenko

The 180th Guards Fighter Aviation Regiment (180th Guards IAP) was a military unit of the Red Army Air Force, which took part in the fighting of the Great Patriotic War, and then became part of the Russian Air Defence Forces and finally the Russian Air Force.

The regiment traced its heritage back to the 181st Fighter Aviation Regiment, which began forming just before the beginning of Operation Barbarossa, the German invasion of the Soviet Union. The regiment flew the Lavochkin-Gorbunov-Gudkov LaGG-3 and the Lavochkin La-5 fighters during the war and in mid-1944 was converted into the 180th Guards Fighter Aviation Regiment. Postwar, the regiment became an interceptor-equipped air defence unit, and during the Korean War it trained People's Liberation Army Air Force pilots while stationed in China. In 1952 it was moved west to Leningrad Oblast, and from 1953 to its 2002 disbandment the 180th Guards served as an air defence unit based at Gromovo.

== History ==
=== World War II ===
The 181st Fighter Aviation Regiment began forming on 24 May 1941 at Shatalovo air field near Pochinok, part of the Air Force of the Western Special Military District. As a result of the beginning of the German invasion of the Soviet Union on 22 June, the regiment was withdrawn to Rostov-on-Don, where it finished forming on 27 July, training with the 11th Reserve Fighter Aviation Regiment on the Lavochkin-Gorbunov-Gudkov LaGG-3 fighter. The new regiment was organized according to shtat 015/134. The 181st continued training there until 19 August, where it entered combat, directly subordinated to the Air Force of the Southern Front (VVS). On 24 August, the regiment became part of the Air Force of the Southwestern Front's 44th Fighter Aviation Division (IAD), which was transferred to the VVS Southern Front's Air Force of the 6th Army only three days later. The 181st was shifted to the VVS Southwestern Front' 64th Fighter Aviation Division on 7 September. On 1 January 1942, it was reorganized on the front according to shtat 015/174 at Novo-Astrakhan, Voroshilovgrad Oblast in eastern Ukraine. Between 10 February and 2 July, the regiment was assigned to the VVS 6th Army. It fought in the Second Battle of Kharkov.

Worn down from months of fighting, the regiment was pulled out of the front on 2 July and by 10 July was assigned to the 2nd Reserve Fighter Aviation Regiment of the Air Forces of the Moscow Military District, stationed at the Seyma station in Volodarsk. There, it was reorganized according to shtat 015/284 and reequipped with the new Lavochkin La-5 fighter. On 23 September, the 181st became part of the 1st Fighter Aviation Corps' 235th Fighter Aviation Division in the Reserve of the Supreme High Command (RVGK). The regiment would remain with the 235th for the rest of its existence. A month later, it was sent to the Kalinin Front with the corps and division, which became part of the 3rd Air Army. The regiment only remained on the Kalinin Front for a few weeks, and on 6 November it and the 235th IAD was rushed to the Stalingrad Front, where it was included in the 2nd Mixed Aviation Corps. Two days later the corps became part of the 8th Air Army, and the regiment entered combat in the Battle of Stalingrad. The regiment became part of an aviation group commanded by Colonel V.A. Sryvkin, tasked with supporting the advancing troops in the battle. The group was transferred to the right bank of the Volga, and in early December its planes suffered heavy losses to German fighters and anti-aircraft fire. After eight days of fighting, the several regiments of the group mustered only 38 serviceable aircraft, and among them not one La-5. As a result, the group was withdrawn back over the Volga in mid-December.

On 3 January 1943, the regiment was transferred to the Southern Front with the entire 8th Air Army. Between 5 March and 31 May, it was held in reserve with the 235th IAD in the 7th Mixed Aviation Corps as part of the Southwestern Front and then the Steppe Military District from 30 April. On 4 May, the 181st received the honorific "Stalingrad" in honor of its actions during that battle. On 1 June, the regiment was sent to the front with the division, which became part of the 3rd Fighter Aviation Corps (IAK) of the North Caucasian Front's 4th Air Army. The 235th IAD and the regiment were moved to the 2nd Air Army's 10th Fighter Aviation Corps on the Voronezh Front on 10 July, with which it entered combat on 21 July, fighting in the Donbass Strategic Offensive. From 24 August to 3 October, the regiment conducted training in the front reserve. The 181st reentered combat on 4 October, fighting in the advance west through Ukraine, and the front became the 1st Ukrainian Front on 20 October. In early 1944, the regiment fought in the Korsun–Shevchenkovsky Offensive.

On 5 August 1944, the 10th IAK was transferred to the 8th Air Army in the 4th Ukrainian Front. On 19 August, the regiment was converted into the 180th Guards Fighter Aviation Regiment for "exemplary performance of combat missions and displaying courage and heroism." The 235th IAD was also converted into the 15th Guards Fighter Aviation Division. On 27 September, the regiment was reorganized according to shtat 015/364 at Lysiatychi in western Ukraine. On 16 December, the 180th Guards IAP was awarded the Order of the Red Banner for its actions in the capture of Michalovce. It fought in the Prague Offensive in the last days of the war. The regiment left the active army on 11 May 1945 at the end of the war. During the war, the regiment flew 7,695 sorties, reported shooting down 213 enemy aircraft, and destroyed 31 on the ground for a total of 244 destroyed aircraft. This came at a cost of 155 downed aircraft and 64 pilots killed, divided as follows: 25 in aerial combat, 24 failed to return, 2 in air raids and other non-combat losses, and 13 died in crashes and of wounds.

=== Cold War and Russian service ===
Between May and July 1945, the regiment was based at Oberglogau. In July 1945, the 10th IAK was withdrawn to the Carpathian Military District, where it became part of the 14th Air Army, and the regiment moved to Cherlyany. During that year, it was reequipped with the improved Lavochkin La-7. In June 1949, the 15th Guards IAD and the regiment were transferred to the Soviet Air Defence Forces (PVO), becoming part of the 20th Fighter Air Defence Army at Oryol. There, the regiment became one of the first equipped with the Mikoyan-Gurevich MiG-9, the first of a series of Mikoyan-and-Gurevich jet fighters. In April 1950, the regiment received its first Mikoyan-Gurevich MiG-15s. In October 1950, the 180th Guards IAP was relocated to Tangshan in the People's Republic of China, where it was transferred to the newly formed 20th Fighter Aviation Division PVO. The regiment was stationed there until February 1952, training PLAAF pilots on the now-obsolete MiG-9s and providing air defence for Beijing.

In March of that year, the 20th IAD and the 180th were relocated to Veshchevo airfield in Leningrad Oblast. In mid-1953, the regiment moved to the Gromovo, Priozersky District of Leningrad Oblast. The regiment received Yakovlev Yak-25M long-range interceptors in August 1955. In 1961 it became part of the 18th Air Defence Corps after the 20th IAD was disbanded. By a directive of 25 January 1962, the regiment's honorific Stalingrad was removed, but on 29 September 1964 the regiment received the honorific Volgograd in order to preserve its traditions. The regiment was reequipped with the newer Sukhoi Su-15 in March 1969, receiving the Su-15TM variant in June 1978 after the 57th Guards Fighter Aviation Regiment at Veshchevo disbanded. Between April 1980 and April 1986, the 180th was directly subordinated to the VVS Leningrad Military District. The regiment then became part of the 54th Air Defence Corps of the 6th Air Defence Army. The regiment replaced its Su-15s with Mikoyan MiG-31 interceptors in June 1988. In November 1990, the regiment, according to Treaty on Conventional Armed Forces in Europe data, had 31 MiG-31s. By 2000 it had 28 MiG-31s and was disbanded on 1 July 2002.

== Aircraft operated ==
Aircraft operated by 181st IAP/180th Guards IAP, data from
From	To	Aircraft	Version
1941	1942	Lavochkin-Gorbunov-Gudkov LaGG-3	
1942	1945	Lavochkin La-5	
1945	1948	Lavochkin La-7	
October 1948 or 1949	1950	Mikoyan-Gurevich MiG-9	
April 1950	1955	Mikoyan-Gurevich MiG-15	
August 1955	1969	Yakovlev Yak-25	Yak-25M
March 1969	1988	Sukhoi Su-15	Su-15TM from June 1978 to 1988
June 1988	2002	Mikoyan MiG-31	

== Commanders ==
The following officers commanded the regiment during World War II:

- Lieutenant Colonel Alexey Kostenko (August 1941 – 12 January 1942)
- Senior Lieutenant Ivan Volkov (acting, January – March 1942)
- Lieutenant Colonel Alexey Kostenko (March – May 1942)
- Major Nikolay Gorev (September 1942 – July 1943)
- Major (promoted to Lieutenant Colonel) Pyotr Soshenko (September 1943 – killed 10 February 1945)
- Major Nikolay Veselov (February – December 1945)
