= 333rd Radio-Technical Regiment =

16th Radio-Technical Regiment (1951–1966) 46th Radio-Technical Brigade (1966–2009) 333rd Radio-Technical Regiment (2009–present)
- Insignia of the 333rd Regiment, c. 2000s
- Active: 1951–present
- Country: Soviet Union; Russia
- Branch: Soviet Air Defense Forces; Russian Air Defense Forces; Russian Air Force; Russian Aerospace Forces
- Type: Radar unit
- Role: Air defense
- Part of: 2nd Air Defense Division (formerly 54th Air Defense Corps; 1986–present)
- Garrison/HQ: Khvoyny

The 333rd Radio-Technical Regiment (Russian: 333-й радиотехнический полк; Military Unit Number 17646) is a radar regiment of the Russian Aerospace Forces.

Formed in 1951 as the 16th Radio-Technical Regiment, it was expanded into the 46th Radio-Technical Brigade in 1966. The brigade provided radar capability to the 6th Independent Air Defense Army and then the 54th Air Defense Corps for the air defense of Leningrad, based at Khvoyny. In 2009 it was reorganized as the 333rd Radio-Technical Regiment.

== History ==
The regiment traces its lineage back to the 47th Separate Battalion of the VNOS (Air Observation, Warning, and Communications Service), formed at Stary Petergof as part of the Leningrad air defense system in November and December 1940. The battalion helped defend Leningrad during the siege of the city in World War II, and in the early postwar years became a radio-technical unit. In 1951, the 16th Radio-Technical Regiment was formed from the 32nd, 47th, and 57th Radio-Technical Battalions of the VNOS. In the fall of 1952 the regimental headquarters was moved to Gorelovo.

In the fall of 1966, the regiment was expanded into the 46th Radio-Technical Brigade, which included units formerly part of the 2nd Radio-Technical Regiment at Gromovo. In the spring of 1967, the brigade relocated to Khvoyny, providing radar capabilities to the 6th Independent Air Defense Army. In 1986, it became part of the 54th Air Defense Corps.

In 2009, the 46th Brigade became the 333rd Radio-Technical Regiment as part of the reform of the Russian Armed Forces. At the same time, the 54th Corps was converted into the 2nd Air Defense Brigade as part of the reform of the Russian Air Forces, and became part of the 1st Air and Air Defense Forces Command. The regiment became part of the 2nd Aerospace Defense Brigade in 2013 and the 2nd Red Banner Air Defense Division in 2014 when the brigade was reorganized. In 2015 the division became part of the 6th Air and Air Defense Forces Army when the latter was reformed. In November 2016, a conscript assigned to the regiment departed unauthorized without his weapon.
