= 967th Anti-Aircraft Rocket Regiment =

351st Anti-Aircraft Artillery Regiment (1940–1944) 72nd Anti-Aircraft Artillery Brigade (1944–1945) 967th Anti-Aircraft Artillery Regiment (1945–1961) 967th Anti-Aircraft Rocket Regiment (1961–1993)
- Active: 1940–1993
- Country: Soviet Union; Russia
- Branch: Soviet Air Defense Forces; Russian Air Defense Forces
- Type: Surface-to-air missile regiment
- Role: Air defense
- Part of: 54th Air Defense Corps (1986–1993)
- Garrison/HQ: Tikhvin (1968–1993)
- Equipment: S-125 (1961–1968); S-200 (1968–1993)
- Engagements: World War II
- Decorations: Order of the Red Banner

The 967th Anti-Aircraft Rocket Regiment (Russian: 967-й зенитно-ракетный полк; Military Unit Number 22222) was a surface-to-air missile regiment of the Soviet Air Defense Forces during the Cold War which briefly became part of the Russian Air Defense Forces.

It traced its lineage back to the 351st Anti-Aircraft Artillery Regiment, formed before World War II to provided air defense for Leningrad. For its actions in the Siege of Leningrad, the 351st was awarded the Order of the Red Banner. It became the 72nd Anti-Aircraft Artillery Brigade in 1944 and the 967th Anti-Aircraft Artillery Regiment in 1945. In 1961, the regiment became the 967th Anti-Aircraft Rocket Regiment with S-125 missiles. It relocated to Tikhvin in 1968, equipped with the S-200V. It was disbanded in 1993 as a result of the introduction of the more modern S-300PS in the Leningrad air defense system.

== History ==
The 351st Anti-Aircraft Artillery Regiment was formed in late 1940, covering the northern air defense sector of Leningrad. During the Siege of Leningrad in World War II, the regiment defended the city against air attack. During a 5 April raid, gunner Bespalov of Senior Lieutenant P.A. Kaplar claimed a Junkers Ju 88 downed. On 4 October, Senior Sergeant B.S. Alymov's crew claimed three enemy aircraft downed during the Sinyavino Offensive. Between 26 September and 6 October of that year, the 189th and 351st Regiments claimed 40 enemy aircraft downed combined. In January 1943, the regiment covered ground troops during Operation Iskra. For its actions, the regiment's 3rd Battalion was awarded the Order of the Red Banner on 14 February, and the 351st was awarded the same decoration on 9 February 1944. In May of that year, the regiment became the 72nd Anti-Aircraft Artillery Brigade. In the fall of 1945, the brigade became the 967th Anti-Aircraft Artillery Regiment, equipped with medium caliber anti-aircraft guns. Until the late 1950s, the 967th was stationed in the Rzhevka area of Leningrad.

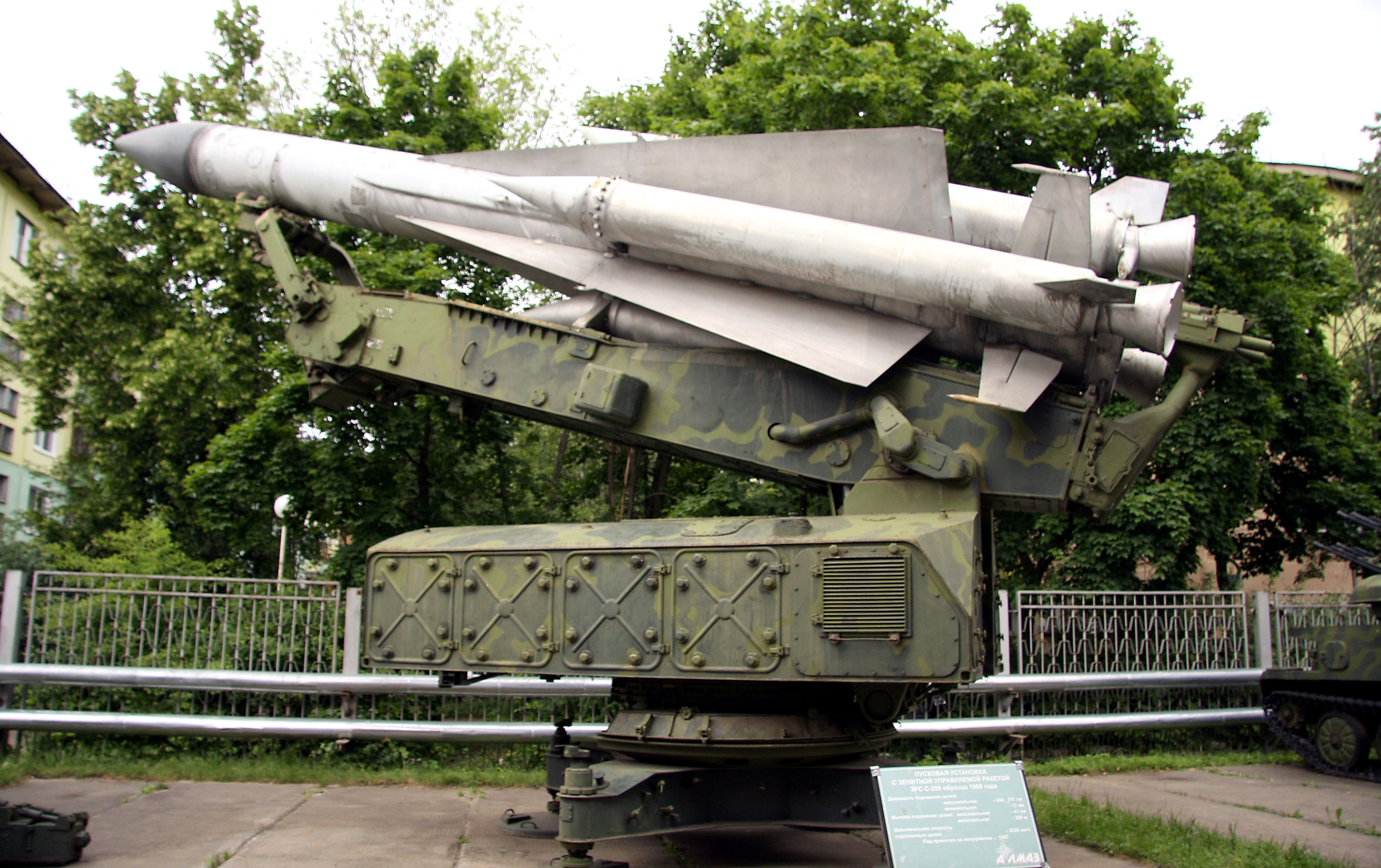
An S-200V of the type operated by the regiment

In accordance with a directive of 23 January 1961, the regiment was redesignated as the 967th Anti-Aircraft Rocket Regiment, one of three regiments of the 6th Independent Air Defense Army that included six battalions of S-125 missiles, designed to target low-altitude, maneuverable aircraft. The 967th was based at Tamengont near Lomonosov on the southern shore of the Gulf of Finland. By a directive of 24 January 1968, a school for training junior specialists of air defense was formed in Tamengont, and the regiment was transferred to Tikhvin and reequipped with long-range S-200 missiles. The 967th included three S-200V battalions, positioned near Kayvaksa.

In 1986, the regiment became part of the 54th Air Defense Corps. After the more modern S-300PS was introduced into the Leningrad air defense system, the S-200V units were gradually phased out, and the regiment was disbanded in 1993.
