= 86th Anti-Aircraft Rocket Brigade =

- Active: 1960–1993
- Country: Soviet Union; Russia
- Branch: Soviet Air Defense Forces; Russian Air Defense Forces
- Type: Surface-to-air missile brigade
- Role: Air defense
- Part of: 54th Air Defense Corps (1986–1993)
- Garrison/HQ: Steklyanny (near Ulyanovka)
- Equipment: S-75 Dvina (1960–c. 1990); S-125 (1963–c. 1990); S-300PS (c. 1990–1993)
- Decorations: Order of the Red Banner

The 86th Anti-Aircraft Rocket Brigade (Russian: 86-я зенитно-ракетная бригада, romanized: 86-ya zenitno-raketnaya brigada; Military Unit Number 28037) was a surface-to-air missile brigade of the Soviet Air Defense Forces and briefly the Russian Air Defense Forces.

Active from 1960, the brigade provided air defense for the Leningrad area with S-75 Dvina and S-125 missiles. It reequipped with S-300PS missiles in the early 1990s, and inherited the lineage of a disbanded unit to become the 157th Guards Anti-Aircraft Rocket Brigade and then the 1490th Guards Anti-Aircraft Rocket Regiment in 1993 and 1994.

== History ==
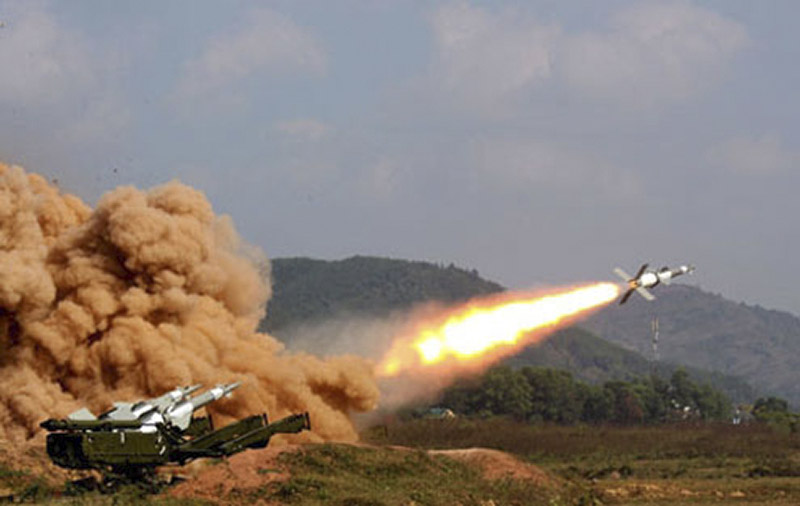
Launching of an S-125 of the type used by the brigade

The brigade was originally formed as the 86th Air Defense Brigade of Special Designation, a unit of System-100, the Leningrad air defense missile system, in 1959. It was the third brigade of the system to be formed and was based at Steklyanny, near Ulyanovka. The brigade became operational in May 1960 with eight battalions of S-75 Dvina missiles, and was redesignated the 86th Anti-Aircraft Rocket Brigade in August. In the second half of 1964 the brigade was reinforced with six missile battalions equipped with the S-125, several of which were mobilization units.

In 1967, the brigade was directly subordinated to the 6th Independent Air Defense Army when the air defense missile system was abolished as an independent headquarters. By an order of 5 October of that year, the Order of the Red Banner awarded to the 192nd Anti-Aircraft Artillery Regiment on 9 February 1944 was inherited by the 86th Brigade. The 192nd provided air defense for Leningrad during the Siege of Leningrad in World War II. In May 1944 it was reorganized as the 48th Anti-Aircraft Artillery Brigade, and in August 1945 became the 961st Anti-Aircraft Artillery Regiment. Cadres from the 961st were used to form the 86th Brigade in the late 1950s.

In 1986, the 86th became part of the 54th Air Defense Corps. In 1990, it began replacing its S-75s and S-125s with the new S-300PS in two groups of battalions. By a directive of 15 February 1993, the lineage of the disbanded 169th Guards Anti-Aircraft Rocket Regiment was transferred to the brigade, which became the 157th Guards Anti-Aircraft Rocket Brigade. In the summer of 1994, it was reorganized into the 1490th Guards Anti-Aircraft Rocket Regiment.
