= 1488th Anti-Aircraft Rocket Regiment =

83rd Anti-Aircraft Rocket Brigade (1960–1994) 1488th Guards Anti-Aircraft Rocket Regiment (1994–present)
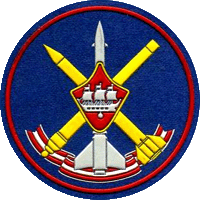
- Insignia of the 1488th Regiment, c. 2000s
- Active: 1960–present
- Country: Soviet Union; Russia
- Branch: Soviet Air Defense Forces; Russian Air Defense Forces; Russian Air Force; Russian Aerospace Forces
- Type: Surface-to-air missile
- Role: Air defense
- Part of: 2nd Air Defense Division (formerly 54th Air Defense Corps; 1986–present)
- Garrison/HQ: Zelenogorsk
- Equipment: S-75 Dvina (1960–c. 1987); S-125 (1964–c. 1994); S-300PS (c. 1987–2016); S-400 (2016–present)
- Decorations: Order of the Red Banner

The 1488th Guards Anti-Aircraft Rocket Regiment (Russian: 1488-й гвардейский зенитный ракетный полк; Military Unit Number 03216) is a surface-to-air missile regiment of the Russian Aerospace Forces.

It was formed in 1960 and soon became the 83rd Anti-Aircraft Rocket Brigade (Russian: 83-я зенитно-ракетная бригада) of the Soviet Air Defense Forces. The brigade provided air defense for the Leningrad area with S-75 Dvina and S-125 missiles. After reequipping with S-300PS missiles, the brigade was reorganized as the 1488th Anti-Aircraft Rocket Regiment in 1994.

== History ==
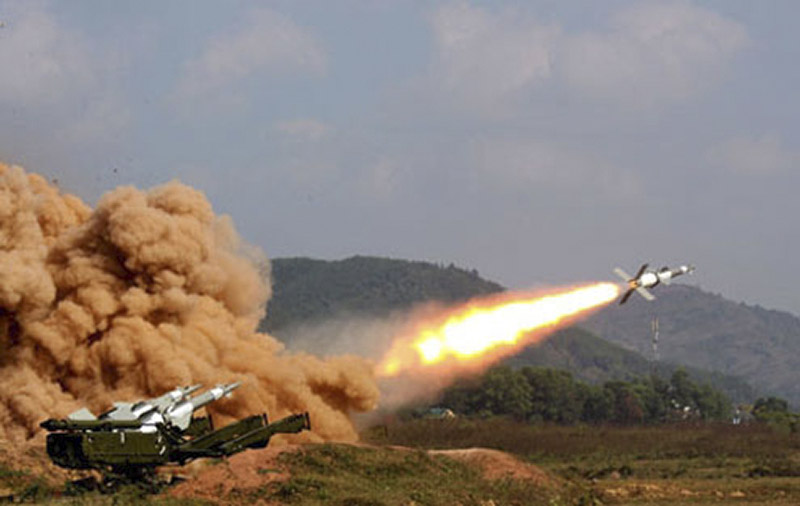
Launching of an S-125 of the type used by the brigade

The brigade was originally formed as the 83rd Air Defense Brigade of Special Designation, a unit of System-100, the Leningrad air defense missile system, in accordance with a General Staff directive dated 15 January 1958. It was the first brigade of the system to be formed and was based at Zelenogorsk-4. The brigade received its equipment between May and July of that year and became operational in its air defense sector in August 1959. It received its battle flag on 22 April 1959. In August 1960, it was redesignated the 83rd Anti-Aircraft Rocket Brigade. It included eight battalions of S-75 Dvina missiles, and was reinforced by six S-125 battalions transferred from the 169th Guards Anti-Aircraft Rocket Regiment in 1964, which had relocated from Vaskelovo to Kornevo and Uglovo to reequip with the S-200V.

In 1967, the brigade was directly subordinated to the 6th Independent Air Defense Army when the air defense missile system was abolished as an independent headquarters. By a directive of 5 October of that year, the brigade inherited the Order of the Red Banner awarded to the 3rd Anti-Aircraft Artillery Battalion of the 189th Anti-Aircraft Artillery Regiment on 19 June 1943. The 189th provided air defense for Leningrad during the Siege of Leningrad in World War II, and cadres from it were used to form the brigade in the late 1950s.

One of the S-75 battalions of the brigade was stationed at Lisy Nos in the Zhdanovsky District of Leningrad during the 1960s. In 1986, the brigade became part of the 54th Air Defense Corps. By the late 1980s, the 83rd included twelve missile battalions of S-75s and S-125s. In 1987, it began rearming with the new S-300PS in two groups of battalions. After the replacement of the S-75s and S-125s had been completed, the brigade was reorganized as the 1488th Anti-Aircraft Rocket Regiment in the summer of 1994.

In 2009, the 54th Corps was converted into the 2nd Air Defense Brigade as part of the reform of the Russian Air Forces, and became part of the 1st Air and Air Defense Forces Command. The regiment became part of the 2nd Aerospace Defense Brigade in 2013 and the 2nd Red Banner Air Defense Division in 2014 when the brigade was reorganized. In 2015 the division became part of the 6th Air and Air Defense Forces Army when the latter was reformed. By 2016 the 1488th had been reequipped with new S-400 missiles.

On July 21, 2025, the regiment was awarded the honorary name "Guards"
