= 555th Anti-Aircraft Rocket Regiment =

- Active: 1960–1995
- Country: Soviet Union; Russia
- Branch: Soviet Air Defense Forces; Russian Air Defense Forces
- Type: Surface-to-air missile regiment
- Role: Air defense
- Part of: 54th Air Defense Corps (1986–1993)
- Garrison/HQ: Ostrov
- Equipment: S-200V

The 555th Anti-Aircraft Rocket Regiment (Russian: 555-й зенитно-ракетный полк; Military Unit Number 30147) was a surface-to-air missile regiment of the Soviet Air Defense Forces during the Cold War which briefly became part of the Russian Air Defense Forces.

Active from 1960, the regiment provided air defense for the Leningrad area with S-75 and S-200V missiles. It was disbanded in 1995 as a result of the introduction of the more modern S-300PS in the Leningrad air defense system.

== History ==
In the summer and fall of 1956, the 555th Anti-Aircraft Artillery Regiment was formed as part of the Soviet Air Defense Forces from the 86th Separate Anti-Aircraft Artillery Battalion, a Soviet Army unit transferred from the Group of Soviet Forces in Germany, previously stationed in Dresden. The new regiment was stationed in the village of Veretye near Ostrov. In 1960, the regiment was split into the 406th and 555th Anti-Aircraft Rocket Regiments. The former was transferred to Petrozavodsk and then to Novaya Zemlya. Both units were equipped with S-75 Dvina surface-to-air missiles. By the end of the year, the 555th included four S-75 battalions with its headquarters at Tishino (Ostrov-2). The regiment was part of the 6th Independent Air Defense Army.

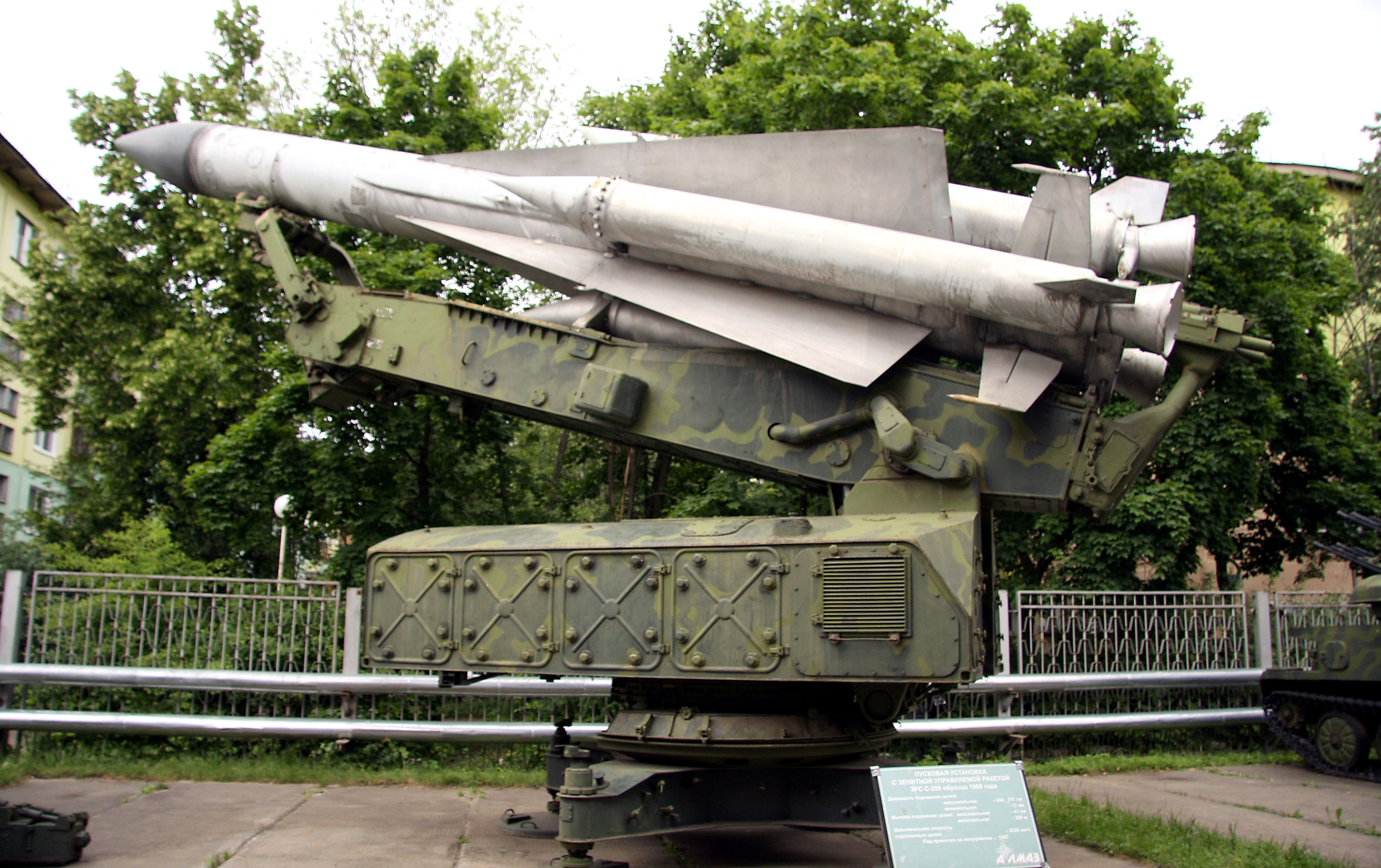
An S-200V of the type operated by the regiment

In early 1971, a group of two S-200V battalions at Ostrov-6 joined the regiment, and two of the S-75 battalions transferred to another unit. In the 1970s and the 1980s, the regiment included two S-200V battalions and two S-75 battalions. In 1986, the 86th became part of the 54th Air Defense Corps. After the more modern S-300PS was introduced into the Leningrad air defense system, the S-200V units were gradually phased out. The 555th was disbanded in 1995.
