= Timonovo =

Timonovo Тимоново
- Selo
- Location within Belgorod Oblast Location within European Russia Location within Russia
- Coordinates: 50°19′N 38°03′E
- Country: Russia
- Region: Belgorod Oblast
- District: Valuysky District

Population (2010)
  - Total: 479
- Time zone: UTC+3:00
- Post Code: 309962

Timonovo (Russian: Тимоново) is a rural locality (a selo) and the administrative center of Timonovskoye Rural Settlement, Valuysky District, Belgorod Oblast, Russia. The population was 479 as of 2010. There are 7 streets.

== History ==
On 18 August 2022, during the Russian invasion of Ukraine, the village was evacuated due to a fire at an ammunition store.

== Geography ==
Timonovo is located 15 km north of Valuyki (the district's administrative centre) by road. Basovo is the nearest rural locality.
