= Gromovo (air base) =

Airport in Leningrad Oblast, Russia

Gromovo Gromovo-Sakkola
- Громово
- Gromovo, Leningrad Oblast in Russia
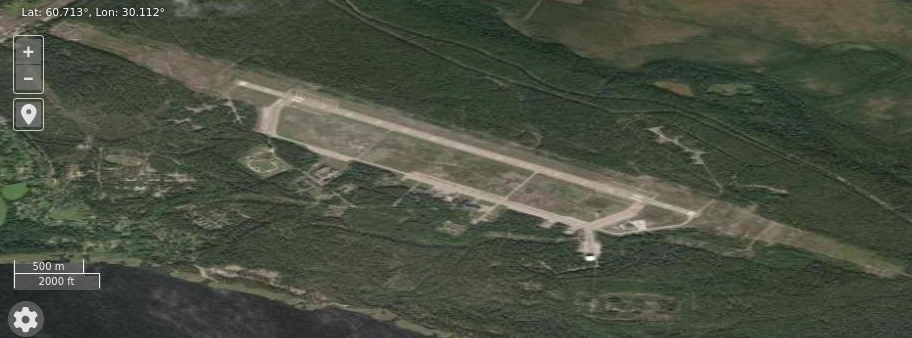
- Satellite imagery of Gromovo air base

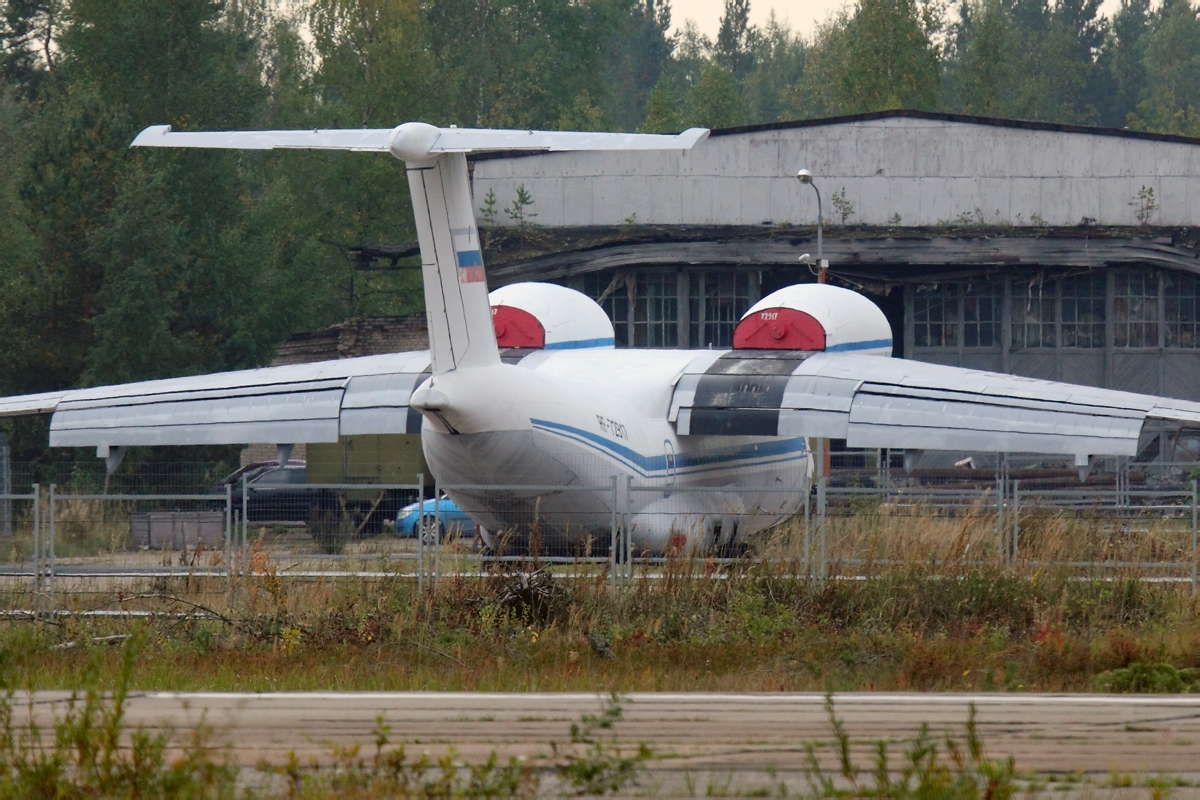
- Antonov An-74 at Gromovo

Site information
- Type: Air Base
- Owner: Ministry of Defence
- Operator: Russian Aerospace Forces
- Controlled by: 6th Air and Air Defence Forces Army

Location
- Shown within Leningrad Oblast Gromovo (Russia)
- Coordinates: 60°42′48″N 30°6′42″E

Site history
- In use: 1953 - present

Airfield information
- Identifiers: ICAO: ULLJ
- Elevation: 70 metres (230 ft) AMSL
Runways
Direction	Length and surface
11/29	2,500 metres (8,202 ft) Concrete

Gromovo is a airbase of the Russian Aerospace Forces located at Gromovo, Leningrad Oblast, Russia.

The base was home to the 180th Guards Fighter Aviation Regiment of the Leningrad Special Air Defence Army and then 6th Independent Air Defence Army between 1953 and 2002. It received the Mikoyan MiG-31 (ASCC: Foxhound) in 1988. It is currently home to the 33rd Independent Transport Composite Aviation Regiment.

== See also ==
- List of military airbases in Russia
- Ozero
