= Haapsalu Air Base =

Airfield in Estonia

Haapsalu Air Base Khaansalu Haapsalu lennuväli
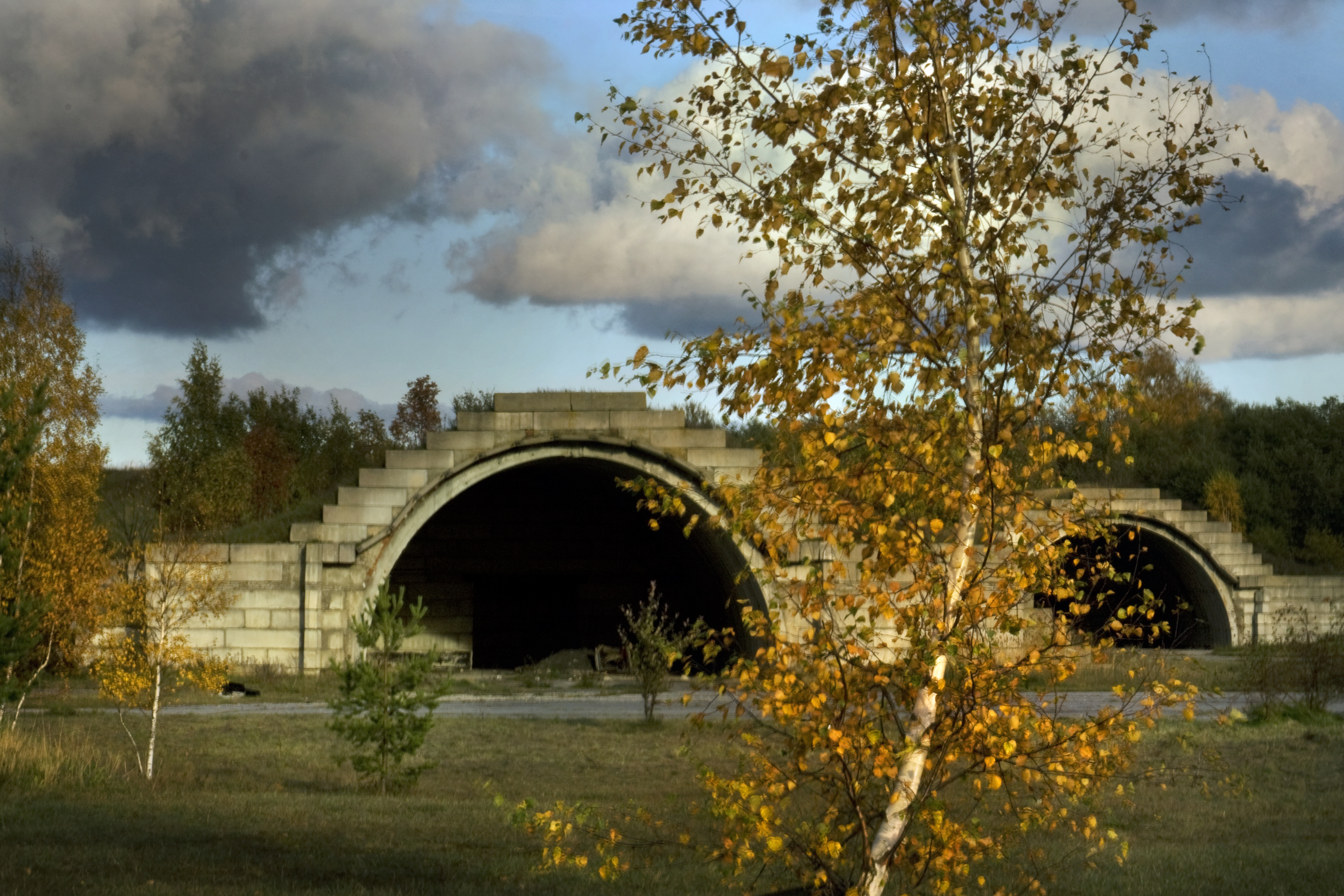
- IATA: none; ICAO: ~~EEHU~~

Summary
- Airport type: Military
- Location: Haapsalu
- Elevation AMSL: 69 ft / 21 m
- Coordinates: 58°54′42″N 023°29′18″E

Map
- Location in Estonia

Runways
Direction	Length		Surface
Direction	ft	m	Surface
~~09/27~~	~~8,202~~	~~2,500~~	~~Concrete~~
- Sources: Forgotten Airfields

Haapsalu Air Base or Kiltsi Airfield (Estonian: Haapsalu lennuväli) is a disused military airfield in Estonia, located 4 km (2.5 mi) southwest of Haapsalu. It was first built by the Soviets in 1939. During the Soviet era, it was an interceptor aircraft base—modern in its day—with several covered aircraft shelters. It was home to the 425th Fighter Aviation Regiment PVO (425 IAP), part of the 14th Air Defence Division, 6th Independent Air Defence Army, Air Defence Forces, between 1970 and 1992, flying up to 38 Mikoyan-Gurevich MiG-23 (ASCC: Flogger) aircraft in 1991. The airfield has been abandoned since the Soviet Air Forces left it in the early 1990s.

After independence, Estonian authorities assigned the ICAO code EEHU but this has since been withdrawn, indicating a lack of intentions to reactivate the aerodrome, neither for civilian nor military use.

As of 2024 the airfield is largely disused but is utilised for occasional military flights.
