= Uglovo =

Uglovo Углово
- Selo
- Location within Belgorod Oblast Location within Russia
- Coordinates: 50°19′N 37°59′E
- Country: Russia
- Region: Belgorod Oblast
- District: Valuysky District
- Time zone: UTC+3:00

Uglovo (Russian: Углово) is a rural locality (a selo) in Valuysky District, Belgorod Oblast, Russia. The population was 64 as of 2010. There are 2 streets.

== Geography ==
Uglovo is located 24 km northwest of Valuyki (the district's administrative centre) by road. Timonovo is the nearest rural locality.
