= Horodok Air Base =

Air base in Ukraine

Horodok
- IATA: none; ICAO: none

Summary
- Airport type: Military
- Operator: Ukrainian Air Force
- Location: Horodok
- Elevation AMSL: 896 ft / 273 m
- Coordinates: 49°44′18″N 023°40′6″E

Map
- Location of Horodok Air Base in Ukraine

Runways
Direction	Length		Surface
Direction	ft	m	Surface
13/31	3,894	1,187	Concrete

Horodok Air Base (Ukrainian: Авіабаза «Городок») (also known as Gorodok Air Base, Cherlyany Air Base, and Cherlyane Air Base) was an air base in Ukraine located 5 km southeast of Horodok. It was a fighter base with revetted areas, 26 km southwest of Lviv.

The base was home to the:

- 3rd Guards Rostov-Donskiy Red Banner Fighter Aviation Regiment PVO between July 1945 and June 1949 under the Soviet Air Forces.

During the 1970s or early 1980s it hosted a regiment of Sukhoi Su-24 (Fencer) aircraft.
