= Kornevo, Vladimir Oblast =

Kornevo Корнево
- Village
- Location within Vladimir Oblast Location within European Russia Location within Russia
- Coordinates: 56°14′N 39°50′E
- Country: Russia
- Region: Vladimir Oblast
- District: Sobinsky District
- Time zone: UTC+3:00

Kornevo (Russian: Корнево) is a rural locality (a village) in Rozhdestvenskoye Rural Settlement, Sobinsky District, Vladimir Oblast, Russia. The population was 24 as of 2010.

== Geography ==
Kornevo is located 38 km north of Sobinka (the district's administrative centre) by road. Kornilkovo is the nearest rural locality.
