= Basovo =

Basovo Басово
- Selo
- Location within Belgorod Oblast Location within Russia
- Coordinates: 50°20′N 38°02′E
- Country: Russia
- Region: Belgorod Oblast
- District: Valuysky District

Population
  - Total: 168
- Time zone: UTC+3:00

Basovo (Russian: Басово) is a rural locality (a selo) in Valuysky District, Belgorod Oblast, Russia. The population was 168 in 2010. There are three streets.

== Geography ==
Basovo is located 19 km north of Valuyki (the district's administrative centre) by road. Timonovo is the nearest rural locality.
