= 159th Guards Fighter Aviation Regiment =

Military unit of the Red Army Air Force in the Second World War

159th Guards Fighter Aviation Novorossiysk Red Banner, Order of Suvorov Regiment
- Active: April 14, 1944 -
- Branch: Soviet Air Force; Russian Aerospace Forces
- Type: fighter aircraft
- Garrison/HQ: Besovets, Karelia
- Nickname(s): Novorossiysk
- Engagements: World War II: Bialystok operation; East Prussian offensive; Mlavsko-Elbing operation
- Decorations: Order of the Red Banner Order of Suvorov 3rd class

The 159th Guards Fighter Aviation Novorossiysk Red Banner Order of the Suvorov Regiment (159th Guards IAP) (Military Unit Number 52906) was a military unit of the Red Army Air Force, which participated in the Second World War. Today it is a regiment of the Russian Aerospace Forces, stationed at Petrozavodsk Airport in Russian Karelia. It now flies the Sukhoi Su-27 and Sukhoi Su-35.

It was formed from the 88th Fighter Aviation Regiment, and succeeded after 2009 by the 6961st Guards Aviation Novorossiysk Red Banner Order of the Suvorov Base.

== Regiment names ==
- 88th Fighter Aviation Regiment;
- 88th Fighter Aviation Novorossiysk Regiment;
- 159th Guards Fighter Aviation Novorossiysk Regiment;
- 159th Guards Fighter Aviation Novorossiysk Red Banner Regiment;
- 159th Guards Fighter Aviation Novorossiysk Red Banner Order of Suvorov Regiment;
- 6961st Guards Aviation Novorossiysk Red Banner Order of the Suvorov base;
- Aviation group of the 7000th Air Base;
- Military unit (Field mail) 40431 (until 09/01/2009);
- Military unit 52906 (since 09/01/2009).

== Creating a regiment ==
Assignments of 88th Fighter Aviation Regiment

Date	Front (District)	Army	Division (Corps)	Equipment
13.04.1940	Kyiv Special Military District	Air Forces of the District	38th Fighter Aviation Brigade	I-16
28.06.1940	Southern Front	5th Army (Soviet Union) Air Forces	38th Fighter Aviation Brigade	Bessarabia, I-16
09.07.1940	Kyiv Special Military District	Air Forces of the District	38th Fighter Aviation Brigade	I-16
25.07.1940	Kyiv Special Military District	Air Forces of the District	44th Fighter Aviation Division	I-16
22.06.1941	Southwestern Front	Air Forces of the Front	44th Fighter Aviation Division	Vinnitsa, I-16
28.06.1941	Southern Front	Air Forces of the Front	44th Fighter Aviation Division	I-16
15.07.1941	Southwestern Front	Air Forces of the Front	Air Forces, 12th or 6th Army	I-16
31.07.1941	Southern Front	Air Forces of the Front	44th Fighter Aviation Division	I-16
09.08.1941	Southern Front	Air Forces of the 26th Army	44th Fighter Aviation Division	I-16
17.08.1941	Southern Front	Air Forces of the Front	44th Fighter Aviation Division	I-16
27.08.1941	Southern Front	Air Forces of the 6th Army	44th Fighter Aviation Division	I-16
01.09.1941	Southern Front	Air Forces of the Front	20th Mixed Aviation Division	I-16
07.03.1942	Southern Front	Air Forces of the 56th Army		I-16
01.04.1942	Southern Front	Air Forces of the 18th Army		I-16
01.05.1942	Southern Front	Air Forces of the 12th Army		I-16
22.05.1942	Southern Front	4th Air Army	216th Fighter Aviation Division	I-16
14.08.1942	Transcaucasus Front, Northern Group of Forces	4th Air Army	216th Fighter Aviation Division	I-16

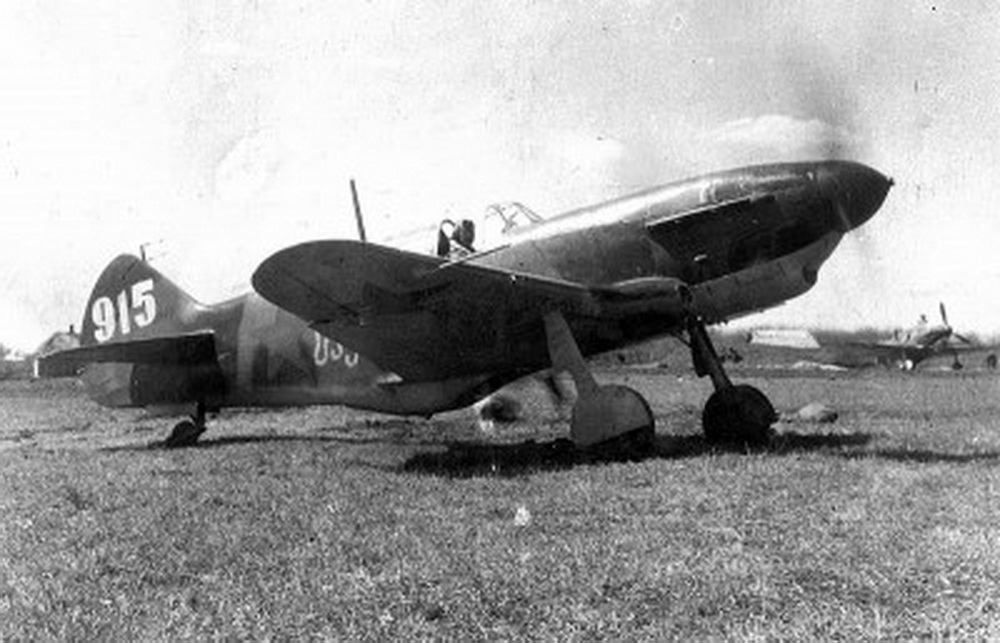
Aircraft LaGG-3 regiment, side number 915, with the inscription: "Soviet Georgia".

The 88th Fighter Aviation Regiment was formed on April 13, 1940, in the Kyev Special Military District in Vinnitsa on the basis of the 4th Separate Fighter Aviation Squadron on I-16 aircraft.

The 88th Fighter Aviation Regiment was at Vinnitsa on June 22, 1941, when the German Operation Barbarossa began.

The 159th Novorossiysk Guards Fighter Aviation Regiment was formed on April 14, 1944, by ranging the 88th Novorossiysk Fighter Aviation Regiment amongst the Guards for the exemplary performance of combat missions and the courage and heroism shown at the same time on the basis of Order of the NPO of the USSR.

From 1945 the regiment was based in Poland. It was assigned to the 239th Fighter Aviation Division from February 1952 onwards. From 1945 to 1948 at Malbork; from 1948 to 1952 at Brzeg; from 1952 to 1961 at Kluczewo Airport; for about eight months in 1961 at Kolobrzheg; from 1961 to 1964 at Żagań; stationed again at Kluczewo from August 1964 to July 1992; and in July 1992 returning to Petrozavodsk Airport in Karelia.

== Reformation of the regiment ==
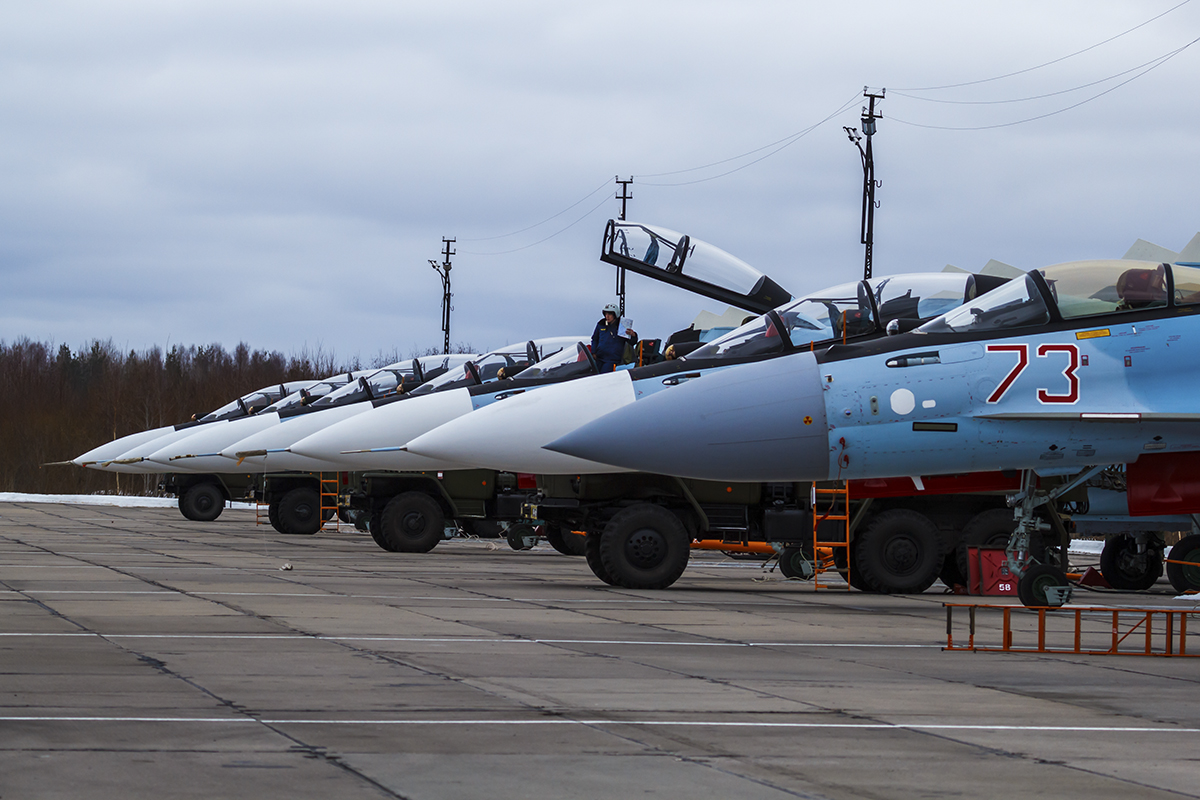
Russian Air Force aircraft lined up at Petrozavodsk Airport during Exercise "Ladoga-2019."

- In the autumn of 2009, the 159th Guards Fighter Aviation Novorossiysk Red Banner Order of Suvorov Regiment was reorganized into the 6961st Guards Aviation Novorossiysk Red Banner Order of the Suvorov Base.
- The 6961st Guards Aviation Novorossiysk Red Banner Order of the Suvorov Base on December 1, 2010, in accordance with the formation of a new image of the Armed Forces of the Russian Federation, was reorganized into the aviation group of the 7000th Aviation Base
- Since 2016 - again the 159th Fighter Aviation Regiment.
