= Gromovo, Leningrad Oblast =

Settlement in Leningrad Oblast

Gromovo Громово
- Rural locality
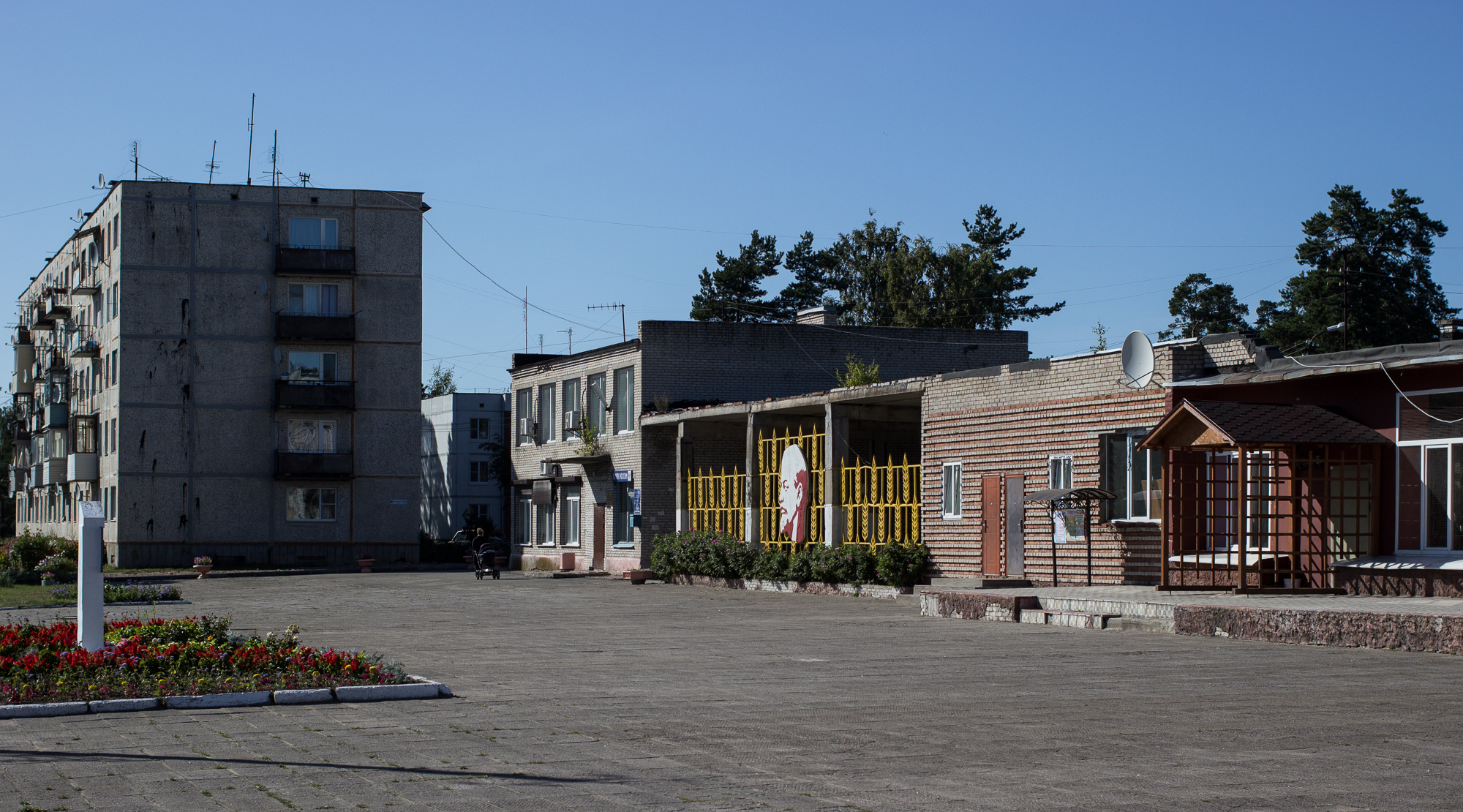
- Interactive map of Gromovo
- Location of Gromovo Gromovo (European Russia) Gromovo (Russia)
- Coordinates: 60°41′41″N 30°11′12″E
- Country: Russia
- Federal subject: Leningrad Oblast
- Elevation: 70 m (230 ft)

Population
  - Estimate (2017): 787 )
- Time zone: UTC+3 (MSK)
- Postal code: 188744
- OKTMO ID: 41639412101

Gromovo (Russian: Гро́мово; Finnish: Sakkola) is a settlement in Priozersky District of Leningrad Oblast, Russia, and a station of the Saint Petersburg-Kuznechnoye railway. Gromovo is situated on the northern shore of the Lake Sukhodolskoye, Karelian Isthmus, in the historic region of Karelia. Until the Winter War and the Continuation War, it had been the administrative center of the Sakkola municipality of Finland. It hosts an interceptor aircraft base, (Gromovo (air base)).

It is located 18 km northwest of Sosnovo, and 90 km north of Saint Petersburg.

== Notable people ==
- Aleksanteri Aava (1883–1956), Finnish poet
- Hanna Granfelt (1884–1952), Finnish opera singer
