= Gostilitsy =

Village in Leningrad Oblast, Russia

Coordinates: 59°44′56″N 29°37′15″E

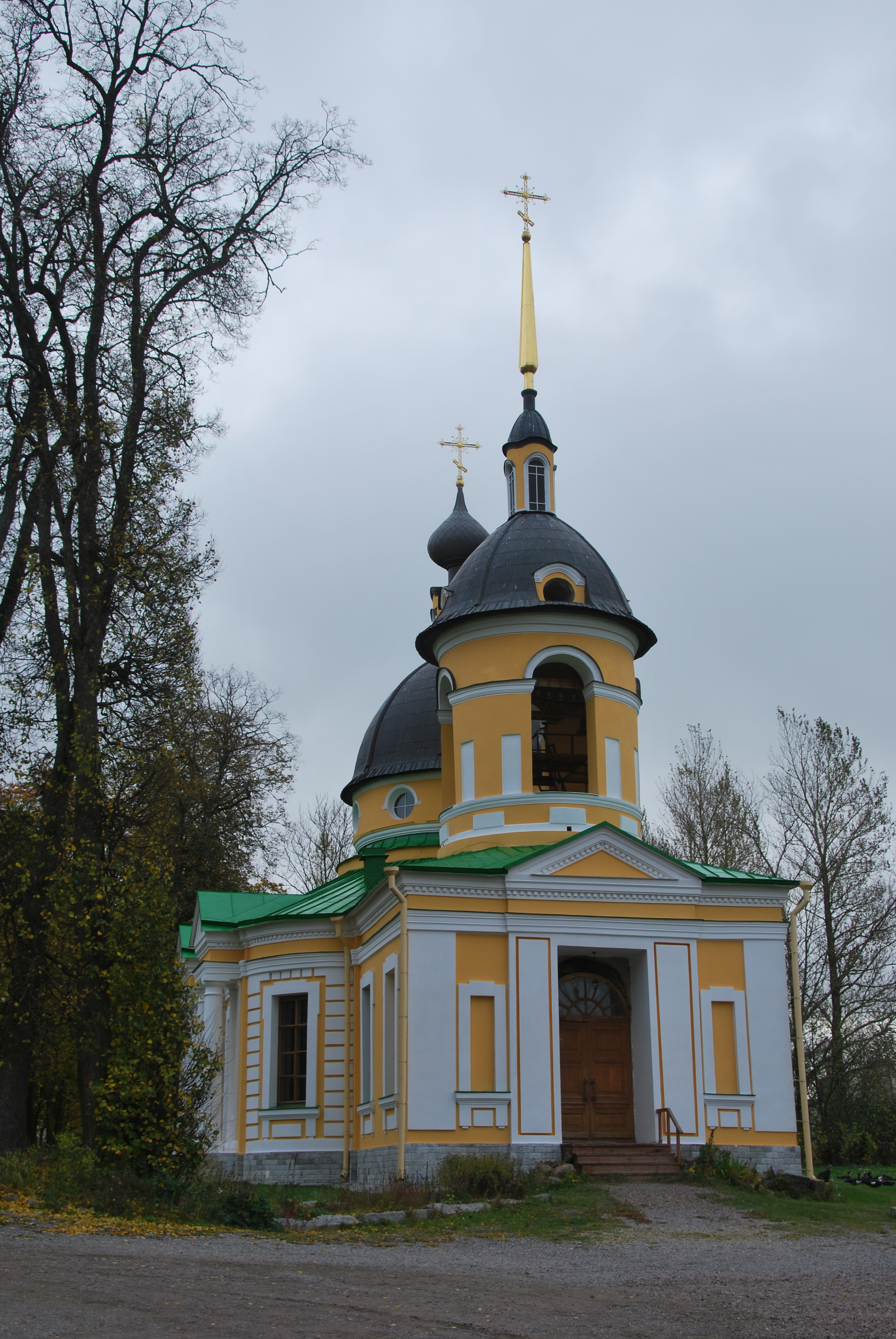
The Trinity Church

Gostilitsy (Russian: Гости́лицы) is a village and the administrative center of Gostilitskoye Rural Settlement in Lomonosovsky District, Leningrad Oblast, Russia, located several kilometers west of the town of Petergof. Gostilitsy is notable by an aristocratic estate, which is a part of World Heritage site Historic Centre of Saint Petersburg and Related Groups of Monuments.

== History ==
The village was mentioned as Gostilitsy in the 16th century. The area currently west of Saint Petersburg, including Gostilitsy, was transferred to Sweden in 1617, according to the Treaty of Stolbovo, and it was conquered back by Russia in 1703, during the Great Northern War. After the war, it was first granted to Robert Areskin, the personal doctor of Tsar Peter the Great, and then changed hands several times. One of the owners in the 1720s was Alexander Menshikov. In the middle of the 18th century, it belonged to Alexey Razumovsky, who built in Gostilitsy a palace which was to serve the royal family when they were travelling from Saint Petersburg.

In the 1845, when the estate belonged to Colonel Alexander Potyomkin, the owners decided to renovate the estate and invited the architect Andrei Stackenschneider, who fully redesigned the palace and made the landscape park around it.

Between August 1941 and January 1944, during World War II, Gostilitsy was at the edge of the Oranienbaum Bridgehead, the territory adjacent to Leningrad and held by the Soviet troops. The estate was severely damaged and was not restored after the war. As of 2012, Gostilitsy Estate was deserted and at the verge of collapse.

== Architecture ==
The Trinity Church was built between 1755 and 1764 in barocco style. It has an oval shape and a low dome. The church was closed in 1939 and disused since the 1980s. In 1993, it was transferred to Russian Orthodox Church and restored. Currently it is the oldest and the best preserved building of the estate.

The palace was built in the 1720s when Burkhard Christoph von Münnich owned the estate, and redesigned in the 1780s, and then in the 1840s. It has two stores and a sophisticated composition with towers and a gallery. The palace was strongly damaged during World War II and never restored.

There are several more buildings in the estate. Three of them are referred to as the northern building (beginning of the 19th century), the southern building (the 1760s, was used to lodge guests), and the southeastern building (the 1760s). There is also a small building which served as orangery and the house of a priest (beginning of the 19th century), as well as a number of one-floor and two-floor service buildings.

The park was designed by Stackenschneider and used to have canals and waterfalls. Several arched bridges survived, as well as the Tea Pavilion from the middle of the 18th century.

== Transportation ==
Gostilitsy is located at the crossroads. The Р35 highway, also known as Gostilitskoye Highway, connects Petergof with Lopukhinka and eventually provides access to Kingisepp. The A120 highway encircles Saint Petersburg, terminating in Bolshaya Izhora north of Gostilitsy. Additionally, Gostilitsy is connected by road with Ropsha and eventually with Krasnoye Selo to the east.

The closest railway station is located in Petergof.

== Gostilitsy airfield ==
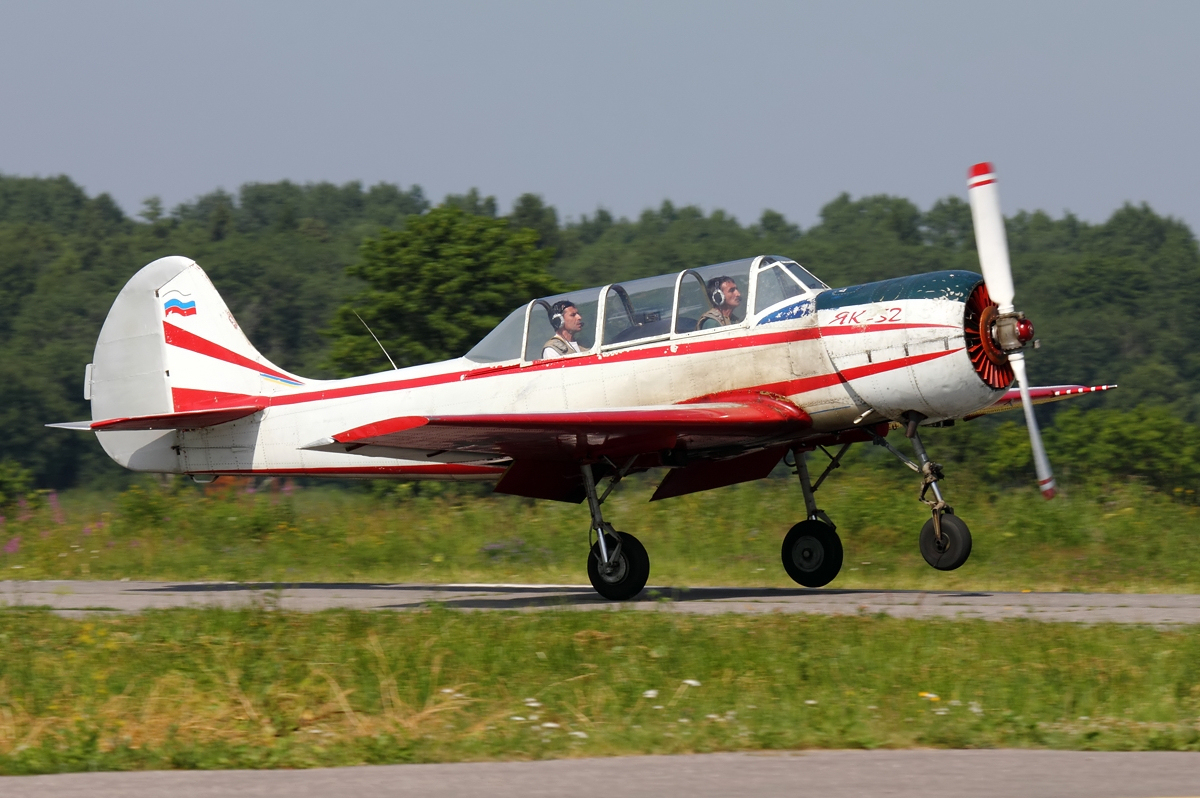
Yakovlev Yak-52 taking off from Gostilitsy

Next to the village, there is the Gostilitsy Airfield, which hosts competition aerobatics events on a regular basis.
