= Soviet Air Defence Forces =

Air defense branch of the Soviet Armed Forces

- Войска ПВО СССР
- Founded: 24 May 1918
- Disbanded: 14 February 1992
- Country: Soviet Union
- Part of: Soviet Armed Forces
- Garrison/HQ: Moscow

Insignia
- Roundel

The Soviet Air Defence Forces (Russian: войска ПВО, romanized: voyska protivovozdushnoy oborony, V-PVO, lit. 'Anti-Air Defence Troops'; formerly: противовоздушная оборона страны, ПВО страны, romanized: protivovozdushnaya oborona strany, PVO strany, lit. 'Anti-Air Defence of the Country') was the air defence branch of the Soviet Armed Forces.

Formed in 1941, it continued being a service branch of the Russian Armed Forces after 1991 until it was merged into the Air Force in 1998. Unlike Western air defence forces, V-PVO was a branch of the military unto itself, separate from the Soviet Air Forces (VVS) and Air Defence Troops of Ground Forces. During the Soviet period it was generally ranked third in importance of the Soviet services, behind the Strategic Rocket Forces and the Army.

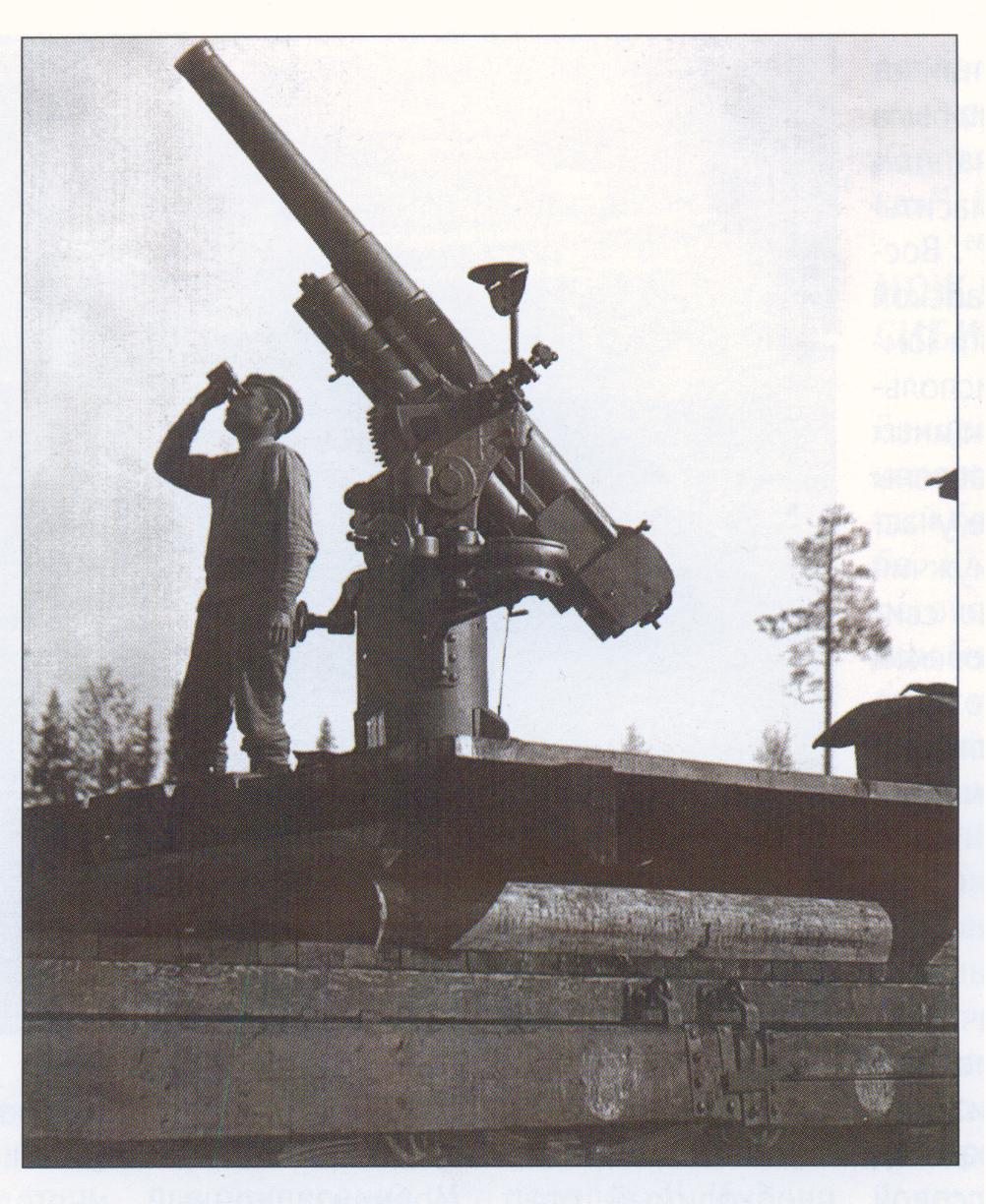
76 mm anti-aircraft gun model 1914/15.

== History ==
=== Service during Second World War ===
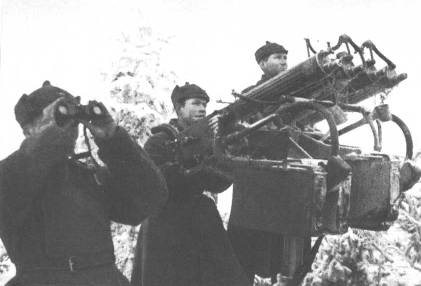
Quadruple anti-aircraft machine gun mount M4 model 1931.

Preparations for creation of the air defence forces started in 1932, and by the beginning of Operation Barbarossa, June 1941, there were 13 PVO zones within the military districts. At the outbreak of war, air defence forces were in the midst of rearmament. Anti-aircraft artillery teams had few of the latest 37 mm automatic and 85 mm guns. Moreover, the troops were deficient in Yak-1s and MiG-3s; 46 percent of the fleet were obsolete aircraft. Increased rates of production were initiated to provide the troops with new equipment. In July 1941, the National Defence Committee took several measures to strengthen the forces guarding Moscow and Leningrad, Yaroslavl and Gorky industrial areas, and strategic bridges across the Volga. To this end, the formation of parts of the IA, IN, anti-aircraft machine gun and searchlight units were accelerated.

A classic example of a major political organization of defence and industrial center was the defence of Moscow. It was carried out by the 1st Air Defence Corps and the 6th Fighter Aviation Corps PVO. As part of these formations at the beginning of German air raids had more than 600 fighters; more than 1,000 guns of small and medium calibers; 350 machine guns; 124 fixed anti-aircraft barrage balloons; 612 stations and 600 anti-aircraft searchlights. The presence of such large forces and their skilful management foiled enemy attempts to inflict massive air strikes. Only 2.6 percent of the total number of Axis aircraft flew in the outskirts of Moscow as a result of their efforts. Air defence forces defending Moscow destroyed 738 enemy aircraft. Assaults by the 6th Fighter Aviation Corps inflicted heavy blows, destroying 567 enemy aircraft on the ground. The Air Defence Forces destroyed 1,305 aircraft and in combat with the armies of Nazi Germany and its allies, alongside the Air Force, destroyed 450 tanks and 5,000 military vehicles.

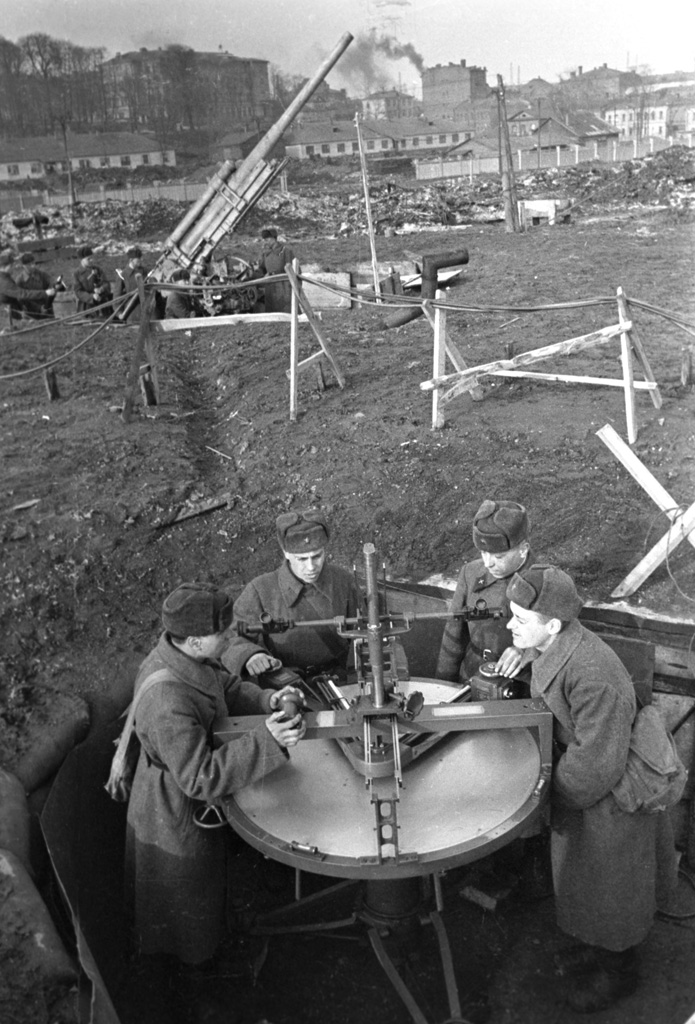
Anti-aircraft gunnery guidance group during the defense of Moscow, November 1, 1941.

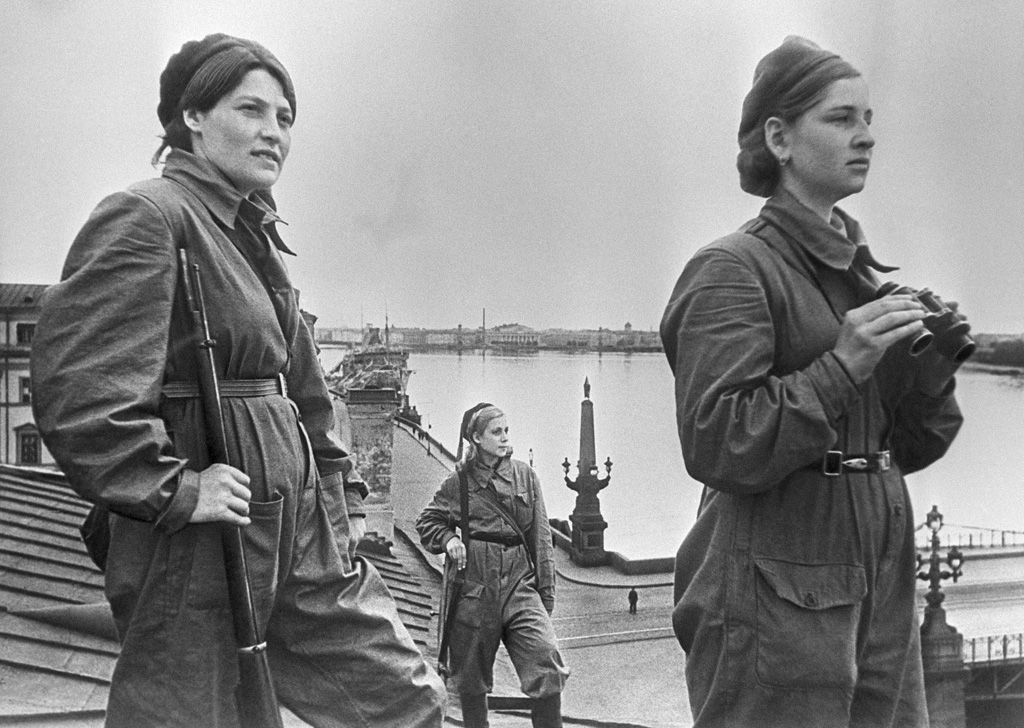
"On combat duty." Girls - air defense fighters are on combat duty on the roof of a house. Siege of Leningrad. USSR, Leningrad.

On November 9, 1941, the post of the Commander of the Air Defence Forces was created and Major General Mikhail Gromadin was appointed. In January 1942, to improve the interaction of forces and air defence systems, the fighter aircraft and crews manning them were ordered to be subordinated to the Air Defence Command. In April 1942, the Moscow Air Defence Front was founded, and the Leningrad and Baku Air Defence Armies were later raised. These were the first operational formations of the Air Defence Forces.

In June 1943, the Office of the Commander of Air Defence Forces of the country was disbanded. Following the reorganization in April 1944 that created the Western and Eastern Air Defence Fronts, and caused the division of the Transcaucasian Air Defence Area, which this year have been reorganized as the North, the South and the Transcaucasian Air Defence Fronts, air defence forces in the vicinity of Moscow were renamed the Moscow Air Defence Army. In the Far East in March 1945, three air defence armies were established: Maritime, Amur and Baikal.

During the Second World War, the Air Defence Forces provided defensive cover to defense industry complexes and vital communication elements, and successfully minimized aerial damage to Soviet industrial and transportation capacity. In the course of the war, the PVO destroyed 7,313 German aircraft, of which 4,168 and 3,145 were targeted by the IA antiaircraft artillery, machine guns and barrage balloons. More than 80,000 soldiers, sergeants, officers and generals of the Country Air Defence Forces were awarded state orders and medals, and 92 soldiers were awarded the title of Hero of the Soviet Union and one was twice awarded the Gold Star Medal in service with the PVO.

=== Structure during Second World War ===
During the war PVO formations were organised as Air Defence Fronts and Air Defence Armies. PVO Fronts normally covered airspace over several ground Army Fronts; these should not be confused with each other. The Air Defence Fronts (Russian: Фронты ПВО) had the following service history:

- Western Air Defence Front
  - 1st formation 29 June 1943 – 20 April 1944 renamed to Headquarters, Northern PVO Front
  - Northern Front PVO 21 April 1944 – 23 December 1944 formed from Headquarters, Western PVO Front (1st formation); re-flagged as Headquarters, Western PVO Front (2nd formation)
  - 2nd formation 24 December 1944 – 9 May 1945 formed from Headquarters, Northern PVO Front
- Moscow Front PVO 6 April 1942 – 10 July 1943 formed from Headquarters, Moscow PVO Corps Region; re-flagged as Headquarters, Special Moscow PVO Army
- Southern Front PVO 21 April 1944 – 24 December 1944 formed from Headquarters, Eastern PVO Front; re-flagged as Headquarters, Southwestern PVO Front
- Southwestern Front PVO 24 December 1944 – 9 May 1945 formed from Headquarters, Southern PVO Front

=== Cold War ===
All the possible air components were divided (as of 1945, before the 1949 reforms of the Soviet Armed Forces) into:

- Active army (Russian: действующая армия, deystvuyuschaya armiya) – air forces assigned to fighting fronts, known as frontal aviation
- PVO Territorial Defence Forces (Russian: войска ПВО территории страны, voiska PVO territorii strany)
- PVO Territorial Armies (Russian: армия ПВО территории страны, armiya PVO territorii strany)
- Reserve forces of the Stavka High Command (Russian: резерв Ставки ВГК, rezerv Stavki VGK)
- PVO of military districts (Russian: ПВО военных округов, PVO voennyh okrugov)
- PVO of inactive fronts (Russian: ПВО недействующих фронтов, PVO nedeystvuyuschih frontov)

The PVO Strany was separated from the other Soviet Armed Forces services in 1949. In June 1949, the 15th Guards Fighter Aviation Division and 180th Guards Fighter Aviation Regiment PVO, among its regiments, were transferred to the PVO Strany, becoming part of the 20th Fighter Air Defence Army at Oryol. There, the regiment became one of the first equipped with the Mikoyan-Gurevich MiG-9, the first of a series of Mikoyan-and-Gurevich Design Bureau jet fighters. In April 1950, the regiment received its first Mikoyan-Gurevich MiG-15s.

In May 1954, the PVO Strany was raised to a status equal to the other service branches of the Soviet Armed Forces, receiving its first commander-in-chief: Marshal of the Soviet Union Leonid Govorov.

The PVO's principal role was to shoot down United States Strategic Air Command bombers if they penetrated Soviet airspace. Secondary target were U.S. air reconnaissance aircraft. There were a number of such aircraft shot down while operating around the Soviet borders, including MiG-17s downing a US reconnaissance Lockheed C-130 Hercules over Armenia, with 17 casualties in 1958. The PVO gained an important victory on May 1, 1960, when a S-75 Dvina missile downed Gary Powers's U-2, causing the short U-2 crisis of 1960. (See Strategic Air Command#Strategic Reconnaissance)

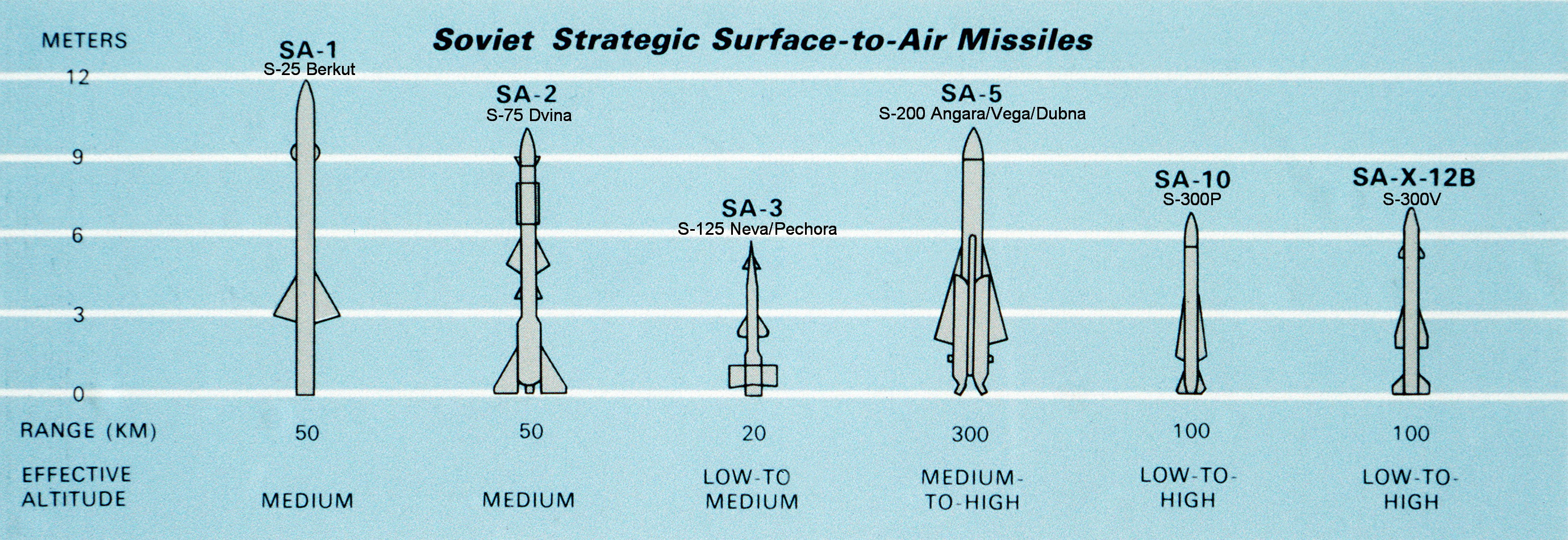
Soviet Air Defence Forces surface-to-air missiles

The PVO had its own chain of command, schools, radar and sound director sites.

On March 30, 1967, a Directorate of the Chief of Anti-Missile and Anti-Space Defence (Управление командующего войсками противоракетной и противокосмической (УКВ ПРО и ПКО)), under Lieutenant-General of Artillery Yuri Votintsev, was formed within the Air Defence Forces. In February 1971 the 1st Division for Warning Against Missile Attack (1st Division WAMA, 1-я Дивизия предупреждения о ракетном нападении (1-я дПРН)) was formed with HQ in Solnechnegorsk, the 57th Separate Radiotechnical Nod in Olenegorsk, Murmansk Oblast and the 129th Separate Radiotechnical Nod in Skrunda, Latvian SSR.

Organisationally, there were two main PVO districts for most of the USSR's postwar history, the Moscow Air Defence District (formed 1950) and Baku (formed 1954). The rest of the country was initially divided into PVO regions covering Belarus, Ukraine, the Baltics and Central Asia. However, in 1960 it appears that most of the PVO regions/areas were reorganised into seven separate armies of the Air Defence Forces – the 2nd, 4th, 6th, 8th, 10th, 11th, 14th, and 19th Air Defence Army. In 1963 the 30th independent Air Defence Corps in Tashkent became the 12th Independent Air Defence Army.

In 1977, the Air Forces and Air Defence Forces were re-organised in the Baltic states and the Leningrad Oblast (a trial run for the larger re-organisation in 1980 covering the whole country). All fighter units in the PVO were transferred to the VVS, the PVO only retaining the anti-aircraft missile units and radar units – the 6th Independent Air Defence Army was disbanded, and the 15th Air Army became the Air Forces of the Baltic Military District. By 1981, the now Voyska PVO had been stripped of many command and control and training assets, which were moved to the Air Force.

During the 1980s, the PVO interceptor units were re-equipped with the Mikoyan MiG-31 and Sukhoi Su-27P, while missile units received new electronic countermeasures systems and the S-300 surface-to-air missile system. The modernization of the PVO prioritized units in the High North and the Far East due to the threat from American spyplane missions and United States Pacific Fleet carrier aircraft.

Shelton lists a total of 140 officer commissioning schools, drawn from a Krasnaya Zvezda list of 17 January 1980. That total included 15 Air Defence Forces schools (four Fighter Aviation, five radio-electronics, and six Anti-Aircraft Rocket).

On 1 September 1983 the PVO shot down Korean Air Flight 007 after the civilian airliner had crossed into restricted Soviet airspace and was mistaken for a spy plane. Previously Korean Air Flight 902 had once crossed into Murmansk airspace, and had to make an emergency landing when a Soviet Air Force Su-15 fired on it. Soviet government officials finally admitted their mistake much to the anger of the South Korean and the United States governments. It even resulted in the forced and sudden resignation of the then Armed Forces Chief of the General Staff, Marshal Nikolai Ogarkov, in the following year by the Chairman of the Presidium of the Supreme Soviet of the Soviet Union (leader of the Soviet Union) Konstantin Chernenko.

Mathias Rust's flight to Moscow in May 1987 caused a massive shakeup within the PVO. It seems that after the KAL 007 shootdown of 1983, no one was willing to give an order to bring Rust's tiny Cessna 172 down, and modernization programmes within the PVO had led to the installation of radar and communications systems at the state border that could not effectively pass tracking data to systems closer to Moscow. PVO Commander-in-Chief Marshal A. I. Koldunov was only among the first to be removed from his position. Over 150 officers, mostly from the PVO, were tried in court and removed from their posts. A large-scale changeover of senior officers of the force more generally followed as well.

=== Under the Russian flag ===
When the Soviet Union dissolved, the air fleet of the PVO included roughly 2,200 fighters and interceptors. The personnel and equipment of many units were left in newly independent republics, although the impact of the loss was reduced by the relocation of some units back to Russia. The Russian Air Defence Forces ultimately inherited about 65% of final Soviet PVO assets.

In December 1994, the 4th Independent Air Defence Army at Ekaterinburg in the Urals was transformed into the 5th Independent Air Defence Corps, which in 1998 became the 5th Air and Air Defence Forces Army. In accordance with a December 1994 directive, the 14th Independent Air Defence Army was reorganized as the 6th Independent Air Defence Corps with the 16th Guards, 20th, and 94th Mukden Air Defence Divisions). In 1998, the force groupings and headquarters of the PVO that had remained within Russia were merged with the Russian Air Force becoming part of the Moscow District of Air and Air Defence Forces, and the 4th, 5th, 6th, 11th, and 14th Armies of VVS and PVO.

The Day of Air Defence Forces (Den' Voysk PVO) was initially established in 1975, to be celebrated on April 11. In 1980 this was changed to the second Sunday of April. It is still celebrated in the Russian Federation even after the 1998 merger of the Air Defence Forces with the Air Force. The unofficial motto of the PVO is: Сами не летаем – другим не дадим, romanized: Sami ne letaem – drugim ne dadim, lit. 'Don't fly, don't let others / If we can't fly, we won't let anyone else either'.

== Commanders-in-Chief, Air Defence Forces ==
- Marshal of the Soviet Union Leonid Govorov – 1954–1955
- Marshal of the Soviet Union Sergey Biryuzov – 1955–1962
- Marshal of Aviation Vladimir Sudets – 1962–1966
- Marshal of the Soviet Union Pavel Batitsky – 1966–1978
- Chief Marshal of Aviation Alexander Koldunov – 1978 – May 1987
- General of the Army Ivan Tretyak – 31 May 1987 – 24 August 1991
- General of the Army Viktor Prudnikov – September 1991 – December 1997
- Colonel-General Viktor Sinitsin – December 1997 – Feb 1998

The post was then disestablished with the merger of the PVO and VVS in 1998.

== Structure ==
The PVO structure during the Cold War and in Russia until 1998 consisted of three specialized branches: the Radiotechnical Troops (Russian: радиотехнические войска, romanized: radiotekhnicheskie voyska), Surface-to-Air Missile Troops (Russian: зенитно-ракетные войска, romanized: zenitno-raketnye voyska), and Fighter Aviation (Russian: истребительная авиация, romanized: istrebitel'naya aviatsiya; IA-PVO). Armies, corps, and divisions of the PVO were made up of units from all three branches.

- Moscow Air Defence District (now the Russian Special Purpose Command)
- 2nd Air Defence Army (Belorussian Military District)
- 4th Independent Air Defence Army (HQ Sverdlovsk)
  - 5th Air Defence Corps
  - 19th Air Defence Corps
  - 20th Air Defence Corps (Perm, Perm Oblast)
    - 763rd Fighter Aviation Regiment
    - 764th Fighter Aviation Regiment
    - 765th Fighter Aviation Regiment PVO
- 6th Independent Air Defence Army (Leningrad Military District)
  - 27th Air Defence Corps, Riga,
  - 54th Air Defence Corps
  - 14th Air Defence Division, Tallinn
- 8th Air Defence Army (HQ Kiev)
  - 49th Air Defence Corps
  - 60th Air Defence Corps
- 10th Independent Air Defence Army (HQ Arkhangelsk)
- 11th Red Banner Army of the PVO (Far East Military District)
  - 8th Air Defence Corps
  - 23rd Air Defence Corps
  - 6th Air Defence Division
  - 24th Air Defence Division and 29th Divisions of the PVO
- 12th Independent Air Defence Army (HQ Tashkent)
  - 24th and 37th Corps of the PVO
- 14th Independent Air Defence Army (Siberian Military District)
  - 38th Air Defence Corps
  - 39th Air Defence Corps (Irkutsk) (ru:Мукденское соединение ПВО)
  - 50th Air Defence Corps
  - 56th Air Defence Corps (Semipalatinsk)
  - 41st Air Defence Division
- 19th Independent Air Defence Army (19th Army of the PVO) (Transcaucasus Military District) - listing for 1988
  - Communications Center (Novosibirsk, Novosibirsk Oblast)
  - 12th Air Defence Corps (Rostov-na-Don, Rostov Oblast) (became 51st Air Defence Corps in 1998)
  - 14th Air Defence Corps (Tbilisi, Georgian SSR)
  - 15th "Lvov Red Banner" Air Defence Corps (Alyaty (Baku), Azerbaijan Soviet Socialist Republic)
  - 10th Air Defence Division (Volgograd, Volgograd Oblast)

== Inventory (1991) ==
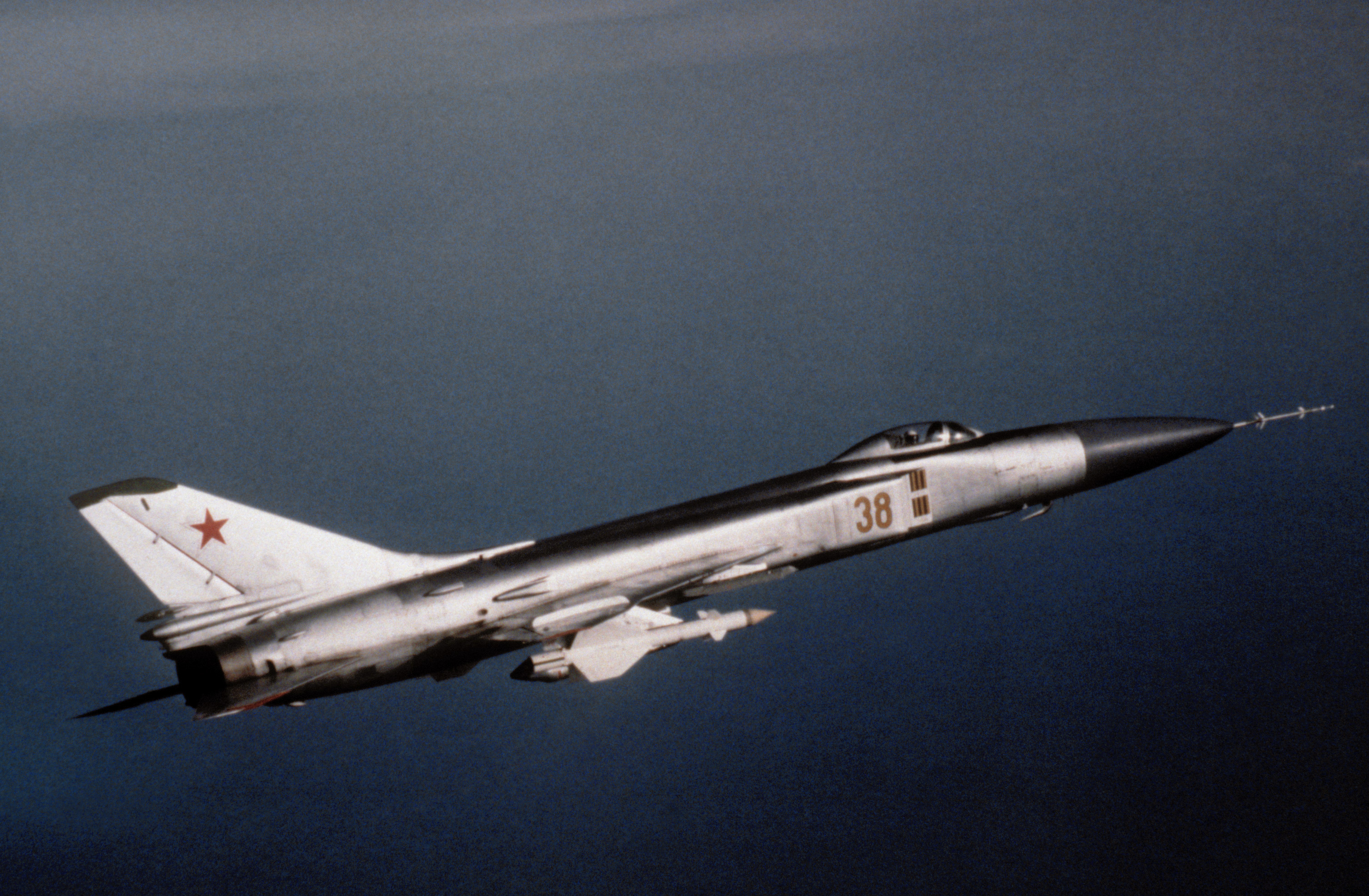
A Sukhoi Su-15 Flagon

The PVO inventory of 1991 was:

2,370 interceptors
500 Sukhoi Su-15
890 Mikoyan-Gurevich MiG-23
480 Mikoyan-Gurevich MiG-25
230 Sukhoi Su-27
270 Mikoyan MiG-31

600 trainers
200 Aero L-29 Delfín
400 Aero L-39 Albatros

In storage
100 Tupolev Tu-128

AWACS aircraft
15 Beriev A-50 Mainstay

Surface-to-air missiles in service in 1990 included:

1,400 S-25 Berkut
2,400 Lavochkin S-75 Dvina
1,000 Isayev S-125 Neva\Pechora – 300+ sites, 2 or 4 missile launchers and rails
1,950 Almaz S-200 Angara\Vega\Dubna – 130 sites
1,700 Almaz S-300 – 850 sites, 15 more building
ABM-1 Galosh Anti-Ballistic Missile, part of the A-35 missile defence system

=== Obsolete aircraft ===
Previous fighter aircraft operated by the PVO included:

- Mikoyan-Gurevich MiG-3
- Lavochkin La-9 Fritz
- Lavochkin La-11 Fang
- Lavochkin La-15 Fantail
- Mikoyan-Gurevich MiG-15 Fagot
- Mikoyan-Gurevich MiG-17 Fresco
- Mikoyan-Gurevich MiG-19 Farmer
- Mikoyan-Gurevich MiG-21 Fishbed
- Sukhoi Su-9 Fishpot-C
- Sukhoi Su-11 Fishpot
- Tupolev Tu-28 Fiddler
- Yakovlev Yak-9
- Yak-25 Flashlight

=== Air-to-air missiles ===
- K-5, AA-1 Alkali - Obsolete short-range air-to-air missile
- K-8, AA-3 Anab - Medium-range air-to-air missile
- K-13, AA-2 Atoll - Short-range air-to-air missile
- R-4, AA-5 Ash - Long-range air-to-air missile
- R-40, AA-6 Acrid - Long-range air-to-air missile
- R-23, AA-7 Apex - Medium-range air-to-air missile
- R-27, AA-10 Alamo - Medium-range air-to-air missile
- R-33, AA-9 Amos - Long-range air-to-air missile
- R-60, AA-8 Aphid - Short-range air-to-air missile
- R-73, AA-11 Archer - Short-range air-to-air missile

== See also ==
- Joint CIS Air Defense System
