= Northern Fleet Joint Strategic Command =

- Объединённое стратегическое командование «Северный флот»
- Great emblem of the Northern Fleet
- Active: 1 December 2014–2024
- Disbanded: 1 March 2024
- Country: Russia
- Type: Military district
- Part of: Russian Armed Forces
- Garrison/HQ: Severomorsk
- Website: Official website

Commanders
- Final Commander: Admiral Alexander Moiseyev

The Northern Joint Strategic Command's area of responsibility

The Northern Fleet Joint Strategic Command (Russian: Объединённое стратегическое командование «Северный флот», romanized: Ob'edinyonnoye strategicheskoe komandovanie (Severn'y Flot)), was a military district of the Russian Armed Forces, with its jurisdiction primarily within the northern region of European Russia and the Arctic Ocean.

The Northern Fleet Joint Strategic Command was the third largest military-administered district by geographic size. It contained four federal subjects of Russia: Arkhangelsk Oblast, Komi Republic, Murmansk Oblast, and Nenets Autonomous Okrug. Additionally, the command contains most of Russia's islands in the Arctic Sea, including those located in federal subjects not within the district. The command's main aim was to concentrate all military responsibility over Russia's territories in the Arctic as well as secure all Russian interests and power projection in the region.

The command was headquartered in Severomorsk, and its former military commander is Admiral Aleksandr Moiseyev, who held the position since 3 May 2019.

In October 2023 a decree was prepared to strip the Northern Fleet of its special status as a military district. In early 2024, it was announced that the command would be subsumed into the wider, newly reconstituted Leningrad Military District. On 26 February 2024, by decree of President Vladimir Putin, the Leningrad Military District was separated from the Western Military District as a separate military-administrative unit of Russia, abolishing the Northern Fleet Joint Strategic Command, effective on 1 March. It was subsequently reported that the Northern Fleet was being directly subordinated to the Russian Navy central command while its ground forces (excluding naval infantry which remains with the Fleet) and some of its air units would be transferred to other army or air force commands.

== History ==
The Northern Fleet Joint Strategic Command was established on 1 December 2014 when it was split off from the Western Military District, initially as Russia's only joint military command to give greater autonomy to the Russian Navy's Northern Fleet.

The military command was given the status of a military district on 1 January 2021, according to a Decree signed by Russian president Vladimir Putin on 5 June 2020. The decree established the Northern Fleet as a "joint territorial formation" of the Russian Armed Forces, performing the functions of a military district. Accordingly, the Arkhangelsk and Murmansk Oblasts, Komi Republic, and the Nenets Autonomous Okrug were removed from the area of responsibility of the Western Military District and placed under the Northern Fleet.

== Bases ==
Airfields and ports on several islands, which were last used by the Soviet Union, will be re-opened: the 'Temp Air Base' on (Kotelny Island) in New Siberian Islands, Rogachevo Air Base on Novaya Zemlya and the Nagurskoye Air Base in the Franz Josef Land archipelago. In addition, a new naval base on Wrangel Island was to be built, using prefabricated modules.

In addition, at least seven airfields on the continental part of the Arctic Circle will be opened or re-opened, with Tiksi in Yakutia expected to house the bulk of the Arctic air force. Other continental airfields include Naryan-Mar Airport, Alykel Airport close to the city of Norilsk and Mys Shmidta and Ugolny Airport, both located in Chukotka.

== Units ==
=== Naval Forces ===
As of 7 January 2015, the commander of the Northern Fleet reportedly envisaged a series of coordination-improving tasks, including submarine underwater operations, assigned to cruise vessels. Russian Chief of the General Staff Valery Gerasimov also said that a specialised training centre will be set up for servicemen performing military service in the Arctic Region in 2015.

See: Northern Fleet Order of Battle.

=== Ground forces ===
The Coastal Troops of the Northern Fleet (Береговые войска Северного флота) were the fleet's ground combat element. They include marines, coastal motor rifle infantry and coastal anti-ship missile and artillery elements. The principal brigades of the Corps consist of 2 Arctic motorized infantry brigades:

Coastal Troops of the Northern Fleet (Береговые войска Северного флота)

- Troops HQ (Severomorsk)
- Separate Security and Armed Escort Company of the Severomorsk Garrison Commandature (Отдельная рота охраны и сопровождения Военной комендатуры гарнизона Североморск)
- 211th Separate Security Battalion of the Marine Infantry (211-й Отдельный Батальон охраны МП) (Olenegorsk-2)
- 58th Separate Security Company (58-я отдельная рота охраны) (Gadzhiyevo)
- 741st Signals Center (741-й центр связи) (Severomorsk)
- 186th Separate Center for Electronic Warfare (186-й отдельный центр радиоэлектронной борьбы) (Severomorsk)
- 63rd Separate Marine Engineer Regiment (63-й отдельный морской инженерный полк) (Severomorsk)
- 14th Army Corps (14-й армейский корпус)
  - Corps Command (Командование корпуса) (Murmansk)
  - 58th Separate Command Battalion (58-й отдельный батальон управления) (Murmansk)
  - 200th Separate Motor Rifle Brigade Pechengskaya, awarded the Order of Kutuzov Brigade (Arctic) (200-я отдельная мотострелковая Печенгская ордена Кутузова бригада (арктическая)) (Pechenga)
  - 80th Separate Motor Rifle Brigade of the Coastal Troops of the Northern Fleet (Arctic) (80-я отдельная мотострелковая бригада береговых войск Северного флота (арктическая)) (Alakurtti)
- 61st Separate Kirkenesskaya, awarded the Order of the Red Banner Marine Infantry Brigade (61-я отдельная Киркенесская Краснознамённая бригада морской пехоты) (Sputnik, near Pechenga)
- 536th Separate Coastal [Anti-Ship] Missile and Artillery Brigade (536-я отдельная береговая ракетно-артиллерийская бригада) (Snezhnogorsk and Olenya Guba)
- 99th Tactical Group (99-я тактическая группа) (with K-300P Bastion-P) (Kotelny Island)
- 71st Tactical Group (71-я тактическая группа) (with K-300P Bastion-P and Kh-35 'Bal') (Alexandra Land Island)
- ? Tactical Group (Н-я тактическая группа) (Rogachevo, Novaya Zemlya)
- ? Tactical Group (Н-я тактическая группа) (Sredny Ostrov, Severnaya Zemlya)
- Naval intelligence (part of the GRU, operationally attached to the Northern Fleet):
  - 420th Naval Intelligence Spetsnaz Point (420-й разведывательный пункт специального назначения) (Zverosovkhoz)
- Defensive combat divers:
  - 160th Separate Counter-PDSS Detachment (160-й отдельный отряд борьбы с подводными диверсионными силами и средствами) (Vidyayevo)
  - 269th Separate Counter-PDSS Detachment (269-й отдельный отряд борьбы с подводными диверсионными силами и средствами) (Gadzhiyevo)
  - 313th Separate Counter-PDSS Detachment (313-й отдельный отряд борьбы с подводными диверсионными силами и средствами) (Sputnik)

The two arctic motor rifle brigades are expected to accomplish coast patrolling missions, protect sites and territories on the coast of the northern seas and the Arctic Ocean, support and escort ships sailing along the Northern Sea Route, and demonstrate the military presence in the Arctic.

According to the Commander-in-Chief of the Ground Forces, Colonel General Oleg Salyukov, an Arctic motorized rifle brigade is, as of October 2014, under formation in the Murmansk Oblast, near the Norwegian border, while the second brigade is scheduled for 2016 to be stationed in the Yamalo-Nenets Autonomous Okrug.

=== Air and air defence forces ===
The 45th Air and Air Defence Forces Army was the principal air force formation assigned to the Northern Fleet. As of 2021, fighter units consist of several regiments with a combination of MiG-29, MiG-31, Su-24, Su-25, Su-27, Su-33 and Su-34 fighter and strike aircraft. Additional Anti-submarine, ISTAR and transport aircraft and helicopters are also deployed within the Air Army. The 40th Mixed Aviation Regiment, flying Backfire bombers, is also deployed within the Northern Fleet operational area but remains under the command of Russian Long-Range Aviation Forces.

Air defence elements are said to consist of Pantsir-S1 missile and artillery systems, which had been put on duty on the Kotelnyy Island of the New Siberian Islands archipelago in 2014. The deployment of intermediate and long-range air defence systems in this area has also been planned.

The command involved was the 1st Air and Air Defence Forces Command, including the 531st, 583rd, and 1258th Air Defence Regiments, the 331st and 332nd Radio-Technical Regiments, with other units stationed in Murmansk, Chukotka and Arkhangelsk Oblasts. Air Force Commander-in-Chief Colonel-General Viktor Bondarev said in an interview that by 2017 the Tiksi airport complex will be operational, and it will be garrisoned with upgraded MiG-31 interceptors.

A number of redesignations from 2014 changed the apparent order of battle. Air and Space Defence Brigades were changed back to the familiar nomenclature of Air Defence Divisions, and thus the 1st Air Defence Division (Russia) was reformed. The 1st Air and Air Defence Forces Command returned to the previous title 6th Air and Air Defence Forces Army. In January 2016, Defence Minister Sergey Shoygu announced that the Northern Fleet 45th Air and Air Defence Army (ru:45-я армия ВВС и ПВО Северного флота) had been formed in December 2015. The force includes the 1st and 3rd Air Defence Divisions, and at least 6 other aircraft regiments, including the 100th and 279th Shipborne Fighter Aviation Regiments, and the 73rd Anti-Submarine Squadron Long Range of Tupolev Tu-142s.

== Composition ==
According to a report from the Institute for the Study of War, in March 2018 the command comprised:

=== Northern Fleet ===
- 43rd Missile Ships Division, in Severomorsk
  - Kuznetsov-class aircraft carrier: Admiral Kuznetsov (063)
  - Kirov-class heavy nuclear guided missile-battlecruisers: Peter the Great (099) and Admiral Nakhimov (080)
  - Slava-class guided missile cruiser: Marshal Ustinov (055)
  - Sovremenny-class guided missile destroyer: Admiral Ushakov (434)
- 14th brigade of anti-submarine ships, military unit 20546 (Murmansk region, Severomorsk)
- 43rd separate division of ships for the protection of the water area (Severodvinsk)
- 44th group of support vessels (Arkhangelsk region, Severodvinsk)
- 432th detachment of support vessels (Murmansk region, Severomorsk)
- 41st District of the Hydrographic Service (Arkhangelsk Region, Severodvinsk)
- Kola Red Banner Flotilla of Diverse Forces, military unit 36070 (Murmansk Region, Polyarny)
  - 121st landing ship brigade, military unit 36045 (Polyarny)
  - 161st submarine brigade, military unit 36021 (Polyarny)
  - 7th Guards Brigade of ships for the protection of the water area, military unit 90829 (Polyarny)
  - 86th rescue squad of the search and rescue department (Murmansk region, Polyarny)
  - A detachment of support vessels (Murmansk, Roslyakovo region)
  - 8th group of support vessels (Murmansk, Roslyakovo district)
  - 601st separate division of hydrographic vessels (Murmansk region, Polyarny)
  - 518th reconnaissance battalion, military unit 20524 (Murmansk region, Polyarny)
- Red Banner submarine forces of the Northern Fleet (Murmansk region, Gadzhievo)
  - 7th submarine division (Vidyaevo)
  - 11th submarine division (Zaozersk)
  - 31st submarine division (Gadzhiyevo)
  - 24th Submarine Division (Gadzhiyevo)
  - 29th separate brigade of special-purpose submarines GUGI, military unit 13090 (Murmansk region, Gadzhievo, Olenya Guba settlement)

=== 45th Air Force and Air Defense Army ===
- Headquarters, military unit 06351 (township Safonovo, Severomorsk, Murmansk region);
- 40th mixed aviation regiment, military unit 36097 (Olenya Airfield - not under 45th Air Army, under command of Russian Long Range Aviation);
- 98th Separate Mixed Aviation Regiment, at Monchegorsk Air Base, Monchegorsk (armed with Sukhoi Su-24 strike aircraft, Su-24MR reconnaissance aircraft, and Mil Mi-24)
- 174th Separate Fighter Aviation Regiment, at Monchegorsk Air Base, Monchegorsk (armed with Mikoyan MiG-31BM)
- 403rd Separate Mixed Aviation Regiment, at Severomorsk-1 Air Base, Severomorsk – formed on 1 December 2019 (armed with Ilyushin Illyusian Il-38 anti-submarine warfare aircraft)
- 100th Separate Shipborne Fighter Aviation Regiment, at Severomorsk-3 Air Base, Severomorsk (armed with Mikoyan MiG-29 fighters and Mikoyan MiG-29K)
- 279th Separate Shipborne Fighter Aviation Regiment, at Severomorsk-3 Air Base, Severomorsk (armed with Sukhoi Su-33 fighters)
- 924th Guards Separate Marine Missile Aviation Regiment, at Olenegorsk Air Base, Olenegorsk
- 830th Separate Shipborne Anti-Submarine Helicopter Regiment, at Severomorsk-1 Air Base, Severomorsk – formed on 1 December 2019 (armed with Kamov Ka-27, Kamov Ka-29, and Kamov Ka-31)
- 2nd Guards Aviation Group, military unit 49324-2 (Kipelovo Airfield);
- 3rd Guards Aviation Group, military unit 49324-3 (Ostafyevo Airfield);
- 73rd long-range anti-submarine aviation squadron, military unit 39163 (Fedotovo, Kipelovo Airfield, Vologda region): Tu-142MR, Tu-142MK
- N-th UAV regiment (Severomorsk, Severomosk-1 Airfield, Murmansk region)
- 89th separate aviation link (Arkhangelsk, Talagi airport): 2 units. An-26, 2 units. Mi-8MTV-5
- Aviation commandant's office (Arkhangelsk region, Mirny, Plesetsk Airfield)
- Aviation Commandant's Office, Kotelny Island
- Aviation Commandant's Office, Nagurskoye Air Base, Alexandra Land
- Aviation Commandant's Office, Severnaya Zemlya
- Aviation Commandant's Office, at Rogachevo Air Base, Rogachevo

==== 1st Air Defence Division ====
- 1st Air Defence Division (1-я дивизия ПВО), HQ at Severomosk-3 Air Base, Severomorsk
  - 531st Anti-Aircraft Missile Regiment, split between Polyarny and Gadzhiyevo (armed with 24 x S-400 SAM/ballistic missile systems and 6 x Pantsir-S1 SAM systems)
  - 583rd Anti-Aircraft Missile Regiment, at Olenegorsk Air Base, Olenegorsk (armed with 12 x S-300PM SAM/ballistic missile systems and 12 x S-300PS SAM/ballistic missile systems)
  - 1528th Anti-Aircraft Missile Regiment, in Severodvinsk, Arkhangelsk (armed with S-400 SAM/ballistic missile systems)

==== 3rd Air Defence Division ====
The 3rd Air Defence Division was formed in 2019 and became operational in 2020. It is responsible for the air defence of the arctic.

- 3rd Air Defence Division (3-я дивизия ПВО) — providing air defence for the Russian Arctic
  - 33rd Anti-Aircraft Missile Regiment, at Rogachevo Air Base, Rogachevo – formed in early 2019 (armed with S-400 missile SAM/Anti-ballistic missile systems)
  - 414th Anti-Aircraft Missile Regiment, at Tiksi Airport, Tiksi – formed in 2019 (armed with S-300PS long-range SAM systems)
  - Anti-Aircraft Missile Battalion, on Alexandra Land (with Pantsir-S1)

== Leadership ==
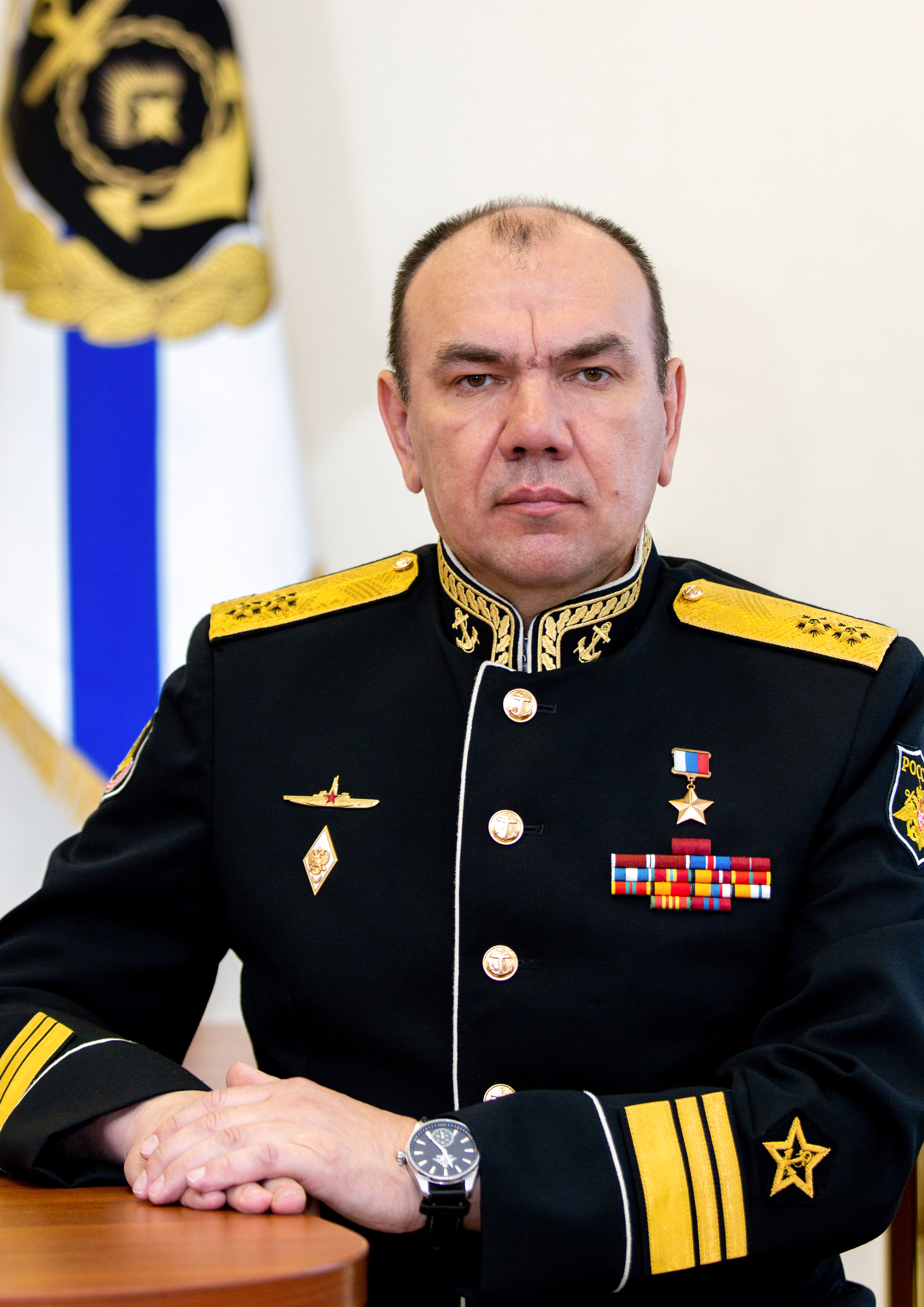
Vice Admiral Alexander Moiseev (2019)

From the command's formation in December 2014 to December 2020, it has been accustomed to have the serving commander of the Russian Northern Fleet as commander of the leadership of the Joint Strategic Command as well. By January 2021, after the transition from military command to district, the leadership was upgraded to the level of the Military District commander.

=== Commanders ===
- Admiral Vladimir Korolyov (22 December 2014 – November 2015)
- Vice Admiral Nikolai Yevmenov (November 2015 – 3 May 2019; acting from November 2015 – 6 April 2016) (later Admiral)
- Vice Admiral (later Admiral) Aleksandr Moiseyev (3 May 2019 – 1 March 2024)

== See also ==
- Northern Fleet
- List of military airbases in Russia
- Arctic warfare
- Arctic policy of Russia
