= Greem Bell Airfield =

Airfield in Russia

Greem Bell
- Греэм-Белл
- Graham Bell Island, Arkhangelsk Oblast in Russia
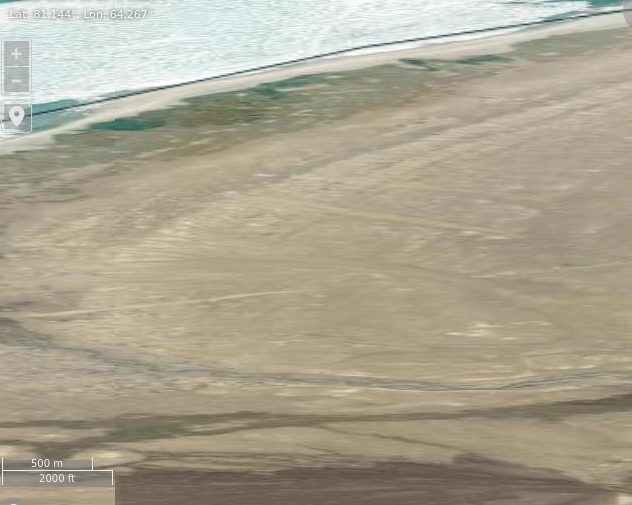
- Satellite imagery of the seasonal Greem Bell Airfield

Site information
- Type: Air Base
- Owner: Ministry of Defence
- Operator: Russian Air Force

Location
- Shown within Russia
- Coordinates: 81°08′38″N 64°16′0″E

Site history
- In use: present

Airfield information
- Identifiers: ICAO: XLDG
- Elevation: 9 metres (30 ft) AMSL
Runways
Direction	Length and surface
	2,125 metres (6,972 ft) Ice
- Russian Air Force Designator: RU-2510

Greem Bell (Russian: Греэм-Белл, lit. Graham Bell) is an airfield of the Russian Air Force in Arkhangelsk Oblast, Russia. It is located on Graham Bell Island in the Franz Josef Archipelago, 1372 km north of Khatanga, and is the northernmost airfield in Russia, at latitude 81°N. It is an ice airfield operational only during the winter months, roughly from the end of November to the beginning of March, and uses the internal callsign XLDG. Greem Bell Airfield was shut down in 1994, but re-opened in 2012.

== History ==
Greem Bell Airfield was created to address the increasing number of United States RB-29, RB-50, and RB-47E reconnaissance missions along the Soviet Arctic coast, culminating with a series of large-scale missions between 1954 and 1956 that resulted in diplomatic protests. The 21st Air Defence Corps, activated on February 1, 1957 at Severomorsk, and its subservient fighter aviation regiments stationed farther southwest near the White Sea and Kola Peninsula, were largely responsible for operations at Greem-Bell, occasionally deploying to this airfield to conduct tests, readiness exercises, and shows of strength. Eventually Greem-Bell fell under the jurisdiction of the interceptor aircraft regiment from Rogachevo (Novaya Zemlya) and was maintained by the Operational Group Arctic (OGA), the Soviet Air Force agency which maintains forward strategic deployment bases.

In March 1978, 4 Tupolev Tu-128 (ASCC "Fiddler") of the 72nd Guards Interceptor Aviation Regiment (72 Gv IAP) from Amderma were based here for a one-month deployment. From the early 1980s it was regularly visited by Sukhoi Su-27 and Mikoyan MiG-31 aircraft of the 10th Independent Air Defence Army of the PVO in Arkhangelsk. On March 18, 1988, Viktor Georgievich Pugachev landed an Su-27UB high-performance jet interceptor at Greem-Bell as part of a proving flight.

During the 1980s and 1990s, the airfield was used for tourist helicopter trips around the Russian arctic as a stop-over and refueling base.

The base was shut down completely in 1994, and was closed to normal visitors. A Russian scientific expedition inspected the site in autumn of 2004 and found isolated instances of PCB contamination from discarded chemical drums. In 2012, the Russian Air Force decided to reopen Greem Bell Airfield as part of a series of reopenings of air bases in the Arctic region.

In the 1960s there was concern in the United States intelligence community that it might serve as a staging base, allowing Tupolev Tu-4 or Myasishchev M-4 bombers to reach the United States. This was an unlikely prospect due to the airfield's position far north of the Northern Sea Route, making it impractical to resupply with large amounts of fuel. Key readiness documents however continued to monitor Greem-Bell as one of nine possible staging bases for the Tupolev Tu-22M (Backfire) until at least 1980.

== Accidents and incidents ==
On 20 October 1963 an Il-14 of the Polar Aviation Administration crashed near the airfield. See ru:Катастрофа Ил-14 на острове Греэм-Белл. An An-12 crashed nearby on 3 May, 1986.

== See also ==
- List of military airbases in Russia
