= Air army (Soviet Union) =

Soviet air forces

An air army (Russian: воздушная армия, romanized: vozdushnaya armiya) was a type of formation of the Soviet Air Forces from 1936 until the dissolution of the USSR in 1991. Air armies continued to be used in the successor Russian Air Force until 2009, and, with a brief break under Serdyukov, from 2015.

The first three Air Armies, designated 'Air Armies of Special Purpose' were created between 1936 and 1938. 2nd Air Army was created on 15 March 1937 in the Far East. Somewhat later, the 3rd Air Army was created in the North Caucasus Military District. However, air armies were excluded from the organisational reform of the air forces approved on 25 July 1940. On 5 November 1940, the three existing air armies were reformed as the long range bombardment aviation of the Stavka of the Red Army due to poor combat performance during the Winter War with Finland.

From May - November 1942, seventeen Air Armies were created from the air forces of the Fronts and Combined Arms Armies, and in December 1944 a long-range aviation Air Army was created as the 18th Air Army. The 1st Air Army was the first created, on 5 May 1942, as part of the Western Front. The next to form during 1942 were the 2nd, 3rd, 4th (22 May 1942), 5th, 6th 8th Air Armies (June 1942), 9th/10th/11th/12th (Aug 1942), 7th and 13th Air Army (November 1942), 14th, 15th, 16th, and 17th Air Armies.

The Air Armies were integrated formations of the Fronts, and were subordinate to the Front commanders for all operating and operational purposes, including air combat operations. The Air Armies consisted of fighter, bomber, assault, and mixed Aviation Divisions, aviation corps, and separate aviation regiments. The structure of an Air Army during the Second World War fluctuated depending on the operational planning needs, and could include 3-4 aviation divisions, up to 8-9 aviation corps, up to 10 separate aviation divisions, and a number of separate aviation regiments, operating from 200-1,000 aircraft in 1942-43, and 1,500 to 3,000 aircraft in some strategic operations by 1944-45.

Also formed were the Air Armies of the Air Defence Forces (PVO), which combined all of the air formations and units of the military districts, and operated predominantly interceptor fighter aircraft. Many of these formations and units were subsequently transferred to the Frontal Air Armies.

While intended primarily for support of the ground forces, the Air Armies also cooperated with the naval forces of the Red Navy Fleets.

The 18th Air Army became Long Range Aviation (АДД), consisting of three armies - the 43rd, with its staff in Vinnitsa, the 50th in Smolensk, and the 65th at Khabarovsk. For Cold War-era air defence, aviation divisions and corps PVO armies were created - the 19th, 21st, 22nd, 25th, 32nd, 42nd, 52nd, and 78th (in Leningrad, Batumi, Arkhangelsk, Tallinn, Kiev, Baku, Yaroslavl and Moscow respectively).

== Air Armies ==
There were eighteen air armies formed in World War II, with many others formed after 1945.

Army	Date formed	Date disbanded	Notes
1st Air Army	May 1942	1998	Formed from Air Forces of the Western Front. Took part in Battle of Smolensk (1943). Redesignated 26th Air Army 10 January 1949. Reformed 1 April 1957 from 29th Air Army and 54th Air Army, part of VVS in the Far East until 1998.
2nd Air Army	1942	1949	Formed from Air Forces of the Bryansk Front. After the war 2nd Air Army was stationed in Austria as part of the Soviet occupation forces. It was disbanded in 1949 by being redesignated the 59th Air Army. The 59th Air Army disbanded in Austria before the Soviet forces withdrew in the mid 1950s.
3rd Air Army	May 1942	1946	Formed from Air Forces of the Kalinin Front. In April 1946 renamed 1st Air Army DA, and transferred to Smolensk, Smolensk Oblast. Became 50th Air Army DA in 1949.
4th Air Army	May 1942	2009	Formed from the Air Forces of the Southern Front. Redesignated 37th Air Army 10 January 1949, reformed 1968, moved to the North Caucasus Military District in August 1992. In 1998, it was redesignated the 4th Army of the VVS and PVO after incorporating the 12th Separate Corps of the PVO. After incorporating all military district aviation, its HQ was moved to Rostov-na-Donu in 2002. Disbanded by being redesignated 4th Air and Air Defence Forces Command, 2009.
5th Air Army	June 1942	2009	Formed from the Air Forces of the North Caucasus Front. Redesignated 48th Air Army 10 January 1949. Reformed after 1998 and served in Volga-Urals Military District until 2009.
6th Air Army	June 1942	2009	Formed from the Air Forces of the North-Western Front, redesignated 73rd Air Army 10 January 1949. Reformed 1998, disbanded by being redesignated 1st Air and Air Defence Forces Command, 2009.
7th Air Army	Nov. 1942	1949	Formed from the Air Forces of the Karelian Front, in reserve by the end of the Second World War. Served on the Karelian Front. In 1946 renamed 3rd Air Army DA, and transferred to Far East.
8th Air Army	June 1942	1991-2?	Formed in June 1942 from the Air Forces of the Southwestern Front, comprising five fighter, three bomber, and two ground-attack divisions. Redesignated as the 2nd Air Army DA 10 January 1949. See also ru:8-я Воздушная армия.
9th Air Army	Aug 1942	1949	Formed on the Soviet Far East Front; became 54th Air Army 10 January 1949. The 54th Air Army became the 1st Air Army in the Far East, 1 July 1957.
10th Air Army	Aug 1942	1949	Established at Khabarovsk with one fighter, three bomber, and one ground-attack division under Major-General Vasiliy Vinogradov. Redesignated 29th Air Army 10 January 1949.
11th Air Army			11th Air Army was retitled 34th Air Army in January-Feb 1949. 11th Air Army of VVS and PVO, with its HQ at Khabarovsk. Its major formations are the 93rd Division of PVO in Vladivostok, 25th Division of PVO in Komsomolsk-on-Amur, and 303rd Mixed Aviation Division in Ussuriysk. Other units are two Radio-technology brigades and various aviation and aviation support regiments, and detachments. The Army's transport aircraft are based at the 265th aviation base in Khabarovsk (Khabarovsk-Bolshoi). The Army also includes three S-300P SAM regiments. Most of the Army's aircraft are Su-27, SU-24, and SU-25 variants, with one regiment (Sokolovka) flying MiG-31 interceptor fighters. Disbanded by being redesignated 3rd Air and Air Defence Forces Command, 2009.
12th Air Army			Redesignated 45th Air Army 1949. The 45th Air Army was later redesignated as the 23rd Air Army.
13th Air Army	1942		Redesignated January 1949 as 76th Air Army.
14th Air Army		2009	Redesignated 57th Air Army in 1949. Colonel General of Aviation Polynin was the commander of 57th Air Army 1956-60.<https://www.generals.dk/general/Polynin/Fedor_Petrovich/Soviet_Union.html> Also 14 A VVS i PVO, 1998-2009. Disbanded by being redesignated as 2nd Air and Air Defence Forces Command, 2009.
15th Air Army	July 1942		From Oct 1943 attached to the Bryansk Front, and later the 2nd Baltic Front; ended the war attacking the Courland pocket; Stationed in Riga, Baltic Military District 1945 - 1991, renamed 30th Air Army in January 1949, but became 15th Air Army again in April 1968
16th Air Army	1942		Disbanded January 1949 by being retitled 24th Air Army. Reformed as part of Group of Soviet Forces in Germany for many years. Withdrawn in 1990s to Moscow Military District.
17th Air Army	1942		Stationed in Kiev 1945 - 1991, renamed 69th Air Army in January 1949, but became 17th Air Army again in April 1968. Primarily a training force by the end of the 1980s.
18th Air Army	Dec. 1944	April 1946	Designed to provide massive strikes on important enemy forces. Used to support important Soviet objectives. Disbanded and used to form the basis of the Long Range Aviation of the Soviet Union.
22nd Air Army			Northern Military District
23rd Air Army	1967	1998	Transbaikal Military District. In 1957, the 45th Air Army became the Air Forces of the ZabVO. 29.7.1967 the Air Forces of the ZabVO became the 23rd Air Army. In 1980, the 23rd Air Army became Air Forces of the ZabVO. In 1990, the 23rd Air Army was reformed from the Air Forces of the Transbaikal Military District. Commander of the 23rd Air Army, General Lieutenant Dimitri Kutsekon, was killed in a helicopter crash in August 1996. A late 1980s(?) order of battle is .
24th Air Army			2nd Separate Heavy Bomber Aviation Corps was established in August 1960 at Vinnitsa from elements of the HQ of 43rd Air Army of the Long Range Aviation. Redesignated 24th Air Army VGK 1 August 1980. South-Western Strategic Direction. At the time of the dissolution of the Soviet Union, this Army had forces in Belarus and Ukraine. In Ukraine, forces consisted of the 32nd Bomber Aviation Division, at Starokonstantinov, the 56th Bomber Aviation Division at Cherlyany, and the 138th Fighter Aviation Division at Mirgorod. In Ukraine in 1991-92, this Army had available over 140 Su-24 Fencer, over 35 Yak-28 electronic warfare aircraft, and 40 MiG-27 Floggers and 40 Su-27 Flankers for strike escort.
26th Air Army			(Belorussian Military District) On 15 June 1992, by decree No. 05 of the Ministry of Defence of the Republic of Belarus, the 26th Air Army headquarters became the command of the Belarusian Air Force.
30th Air Army	1.8.80	October 1994	Long Range Aviation. Activated at Blagovechensk, Amur Oblast, from the 8th independent Heavy Bomber Aviation Corps. 31st and 55th Heavy Bomber Aviation Divisions appear to have been with the Army for most of its existence.
34th Air Army	After 1949	1992	Former 11th Air Army, Transcaucasian Military District, change of title 1949.
36th Air Army	After 1949	July 1991	Southern Group of Forces, Hungary
37th Air Army			Moscow, Long Range Aviation
43rd Air Army			DA - became 43rd Rocket Army 1960
46th Air Army VGK SN			Smolensk, Long Range Aviation. Disbanded October 1994.
49th Air Army			Central Asian or Turkestan Military District
50th Air Army DA			DA - became 50th Rocket Army 1960
65th Air Army			DA - Raised 15 February 1949. Preceded by 3rd Air Army DA (1946–49). Disbanded mid-1953.

- 45th Air and Air Defence Army, Transbaikal Military District 1949-57, reformed in the Northern Fleet in 2016 as part of the Arctic Joint Strategic Command
- 73rd Air Army (Alma-Ata, Central Asian Military District)
- 76th Air Army (Leningrad, Leningrad Military District)

== Armies of the Air Defence Forces ==
Army	Date formed	Date disbanded	Notes
Moscow Air Defence Army			
Baku Air Defence Army			
2nd Air Defence Army	1960?	1991 as PVO army	2nd Army of PVO disbanded circa 1991
4th Air Defence Army	1960?	1998	In 1998, was redesignated as the 4th Army of VVS and PVO after incorporating the 12th Independent Air Defence Corps of the PVO.
6th Independent Air Defence Army	1960?	1998	Merged with 76th Air Army VVS, 1998.
8th Air Defence Army	1960?	1991-2?	Was active with the Voyska PVO in 1980s.
10th Independent Air Defence Army			Soviet Air Defence Forces postwar
11th Independent Air Defence Army	1960?	1998?	11th Air Army of the VVS and PVO, with its HQ at Khabarovsk.
12th Independent Air Defence Army	1963		Formed from the 30th Corps of the PVO in January 1963.
14th Independent Air Defence Army			Also 14 A VVS i PVO, 1998-2009.
19th Air Defence Army		1992-1993(?)	Soviet Air Defence Forces

There were also the 25th (1949-54), 32nd, 42nd, and 52nd Fighter Armies of the Air Defence Forces.

== Sources ==
- Pan'kin V.E. Evolution of organisational structure of AirForce, and ways and methods of ruling and cooperation in Great Patriotic War years (rus)
- Red Army Air Force organization (rus)
- Kozlov, M.M., (ed.), Great Patriotic War 1941-1945 (Russian), encyclopaedia, Moscow, Soviet Encyclopaedia (pub.), 1985
- Svischev, V.N. Gen. Maj. Aviation, Preparation of USSR for war (Russian) Организация военно-воздушных сил СССР перед войной, 2002
- Wagner, R. (ed.), Fetzer, L., (trans.), The Soviet Air Force in World War II: The official history, Wren Publishing Pty.Ltd., Melbourne, 1973
- Keith E. Bonn (ed.), 'Slaughterhouse,' Aberjona Press, Bedford, PA, 2005
- Структура ВВС V.V. Kharin, Aviators of the Second World War (in Russian)
