= 470th Guards Fighter Aviation Regiment =

The 470th Guards Fighter Aviation Regiment (470 GIAP) was a regiment of the Russian Air Force. It drew much of its traditions and history from the previous 169th Fighter Aviation Regiment and the 63rd Guards Vilensky Order of Kutuzov Fighter Aviation Regiment of the Soviet Air Forces. These two regiments were active during the Second World War and the post-war period.

== Service history ==
- On 8 September 1940 the Military Council of the Moscow Military District, decided to form a new 169th Fighter Regiment based in the city of Rzhev;
- In March 1941, the 169 IAP joined the Soviet Air Force as a fully formed and equipped military unit; part of 46th Air Division from 12 August 1940 to March 1941.
- On 23 June 1941 the regiment began fighting in the Second World War;
- On 18 March 1943 the regiment was reorganized into the 63rd Guards Fighter Aviation Regiment; the regiment was part of the 3rd Guards Fighter Aviation Division from March 1943 until 1948 (3 Gv IAD PVO to January 1949).
- On 26 April 1943 the commander of the 1st Guards Fighter Aviation Corps, Lieutenant General Bielecki handed the Guards banner to the regimental commander;
- On 22 October 1944, for the exemplary fulfillment of the command in the battles against the Nazi invaders in breaking heavily fortified enemy defenses east of Riga, and for his valor and courage the Presidium of the Supreme Council rewarded Order of Kutuzov III degree. The Order was awarded on 10 November;
- From 1945 to 1948 the regiment was part of the Group of Soviet Forces in Germany;
- On 28 September 1948 the regiment was moved back to the Soviet Union (to Smolensk airport) and assigned to the 32nd Fighter Corps PVO and 3rd Guards Fighter Aviation Division;
- On 10 January 1949 the regiment changed its name and was renamed the 641st Guards Order of Kutuzov III degree Fighter Regiment PVO and was part of the 98th Guards Fighter Aviation Bryansk Red Order of Suvorov Division;
- In September 1972, the regiment was transferred to Rogachevo airfield, in the Novaya Zemlya island group in the Far North. The regiment was placed under command of the 4th Air Defence Division, 10th Air Defence Army.
- In 1993, the regiment was transferred to the Afrikanda air base in the Kola Peninsula, and renamed the 470th Guards Vilensky Kutuzov Order Fighter Aviation Regiment; the regiment was placed under the command of the 21st Air Defence Corps, 1993–2000.
- On 1 September 2001 the regiment was disbanded. All the regalia of the regiment were given to the 941st Fighter Aviation Regiment Kola connections defense. Renamed to 9 Guards Vilensky Kutuzov Order Fighter Aviation Regiment; the regiment was moved to the Kola Peninsula Kilp-Yavr airfield in 2002.
- In 2009 it was decided to disband the 9th Guards Vilensky Order of Kutuzov Fighter Aviation Regiment.

== Armament ==
Since the end of 1942 - La-5, from 1944 - La-7.

September 1, 1948, the regiment was aircraft Yak-15.

Since 1950, the MiG-15, in March 1953 - to re MiG-17. From 1957 to 1962, the regiment was Squadron MiG-19.

In 1964, the regiment learned Yak-28P.

Since 1987, the regiment flew to stretch Su-27.

== Results ==
Shot down 392 enemy aircraft:

- Fighters - 257
- Bombers - 100
- Transport - 27
- Intelligence - 6

== Combat losses ==
During the fighting regiment lost 55 personnel and 116 aircraft.
