= Kilpyavr =

Kilpyavr may refer to:

- Kilpyavr (rural locality), a rural locality in Murmansk Oblast, Russia
- Kilpyavr (air base), a military air base in Murmansk Oblast, Russia
