= Afrikanda =

Afrikanda may refer to:

- Afrikanda (rural locality), a rural locality in Murmansk Oblast, Russia
- Afrikanda railway station, a railway station there
- Afrikanda air base, a military air base in Murmansk Oblast, Russia
