= 10th Independent Air Defence Army =

The 10th Independent Red Banner Air Defence Army (Military Unit Number 41137) was an army of the Soviet Air Defence Forces, active from 1960 to 1994. The headquarters was at Arkhangelsk, Arkhangelsk Oblast.

The army originated from the White Sea Air Defence Corps of the Northern Military District (Soviet Union), which was commanded by twice Hero of the Soviet Union General-major Pyotr Pokryshev:

- White Sea Air Defence Corps (since 1954);
- Northern Military District (since 17.06.1958);
- 10th Independent Air Defense Army (from 24.03.1960);
- 10th Independent Red Banner Air Defence Army (from 30.04.1975);

== Northern Air Defence Army ==
To cover the European North in 1958 on the basis of the White Sea Air Defence Corps, the Northern Air Defence Army was formed in accordance with a directive of the General Staff of the Air Defence Forces dated June 17, 1958. The new army included:

- Northern Air Defence Corps (Severomorsk), which included:
  - 91st Fighter Aviation Division;
  - 216th Fighter Aviation Division PVO, the former 282nd Fighter Aviation Division (Vaskovo);
  - antiaircraft artillery regiments;
  - Radio engineering units;
- Polyarny Air Defence Division (Belushya Guba, Novaya Zemlya);
- Units of direct subordination of the army;
- 34th communication center.

In 1959 a Guards air defence artillery regiment was incorporated into the Northern Air Defence Corps; subsequently, the anti-aircraft missile brigade (Peninsula)]). In 1960, an air defence missile regiment (upgraded into a brigade) was relocated from the Odessa Air Defence Corps to the Arkhangelsk Region with its control point in Mirny. To strengthen fighter aviation, the 524th Fighter Aviation Regiment was transferred from the Air Force of the Northern Fleet, reequipped with the Yak-25, and relocated to Letneozersky Plesetsk District.

On March 24, 1960, the Commander-in-Chief of the Air Defence Forces decided to transform the Northern Army into the 10th Independent Air Defence Army. Subordinate formations were also assigned combined-arms numbers:

- Northern Air Defence Corps - 21st Air Defence Corps;
- Polyarny Air Defence Division - 4th Air Defence Division

Around 1965, the 359th Independent Transport Aviation Regiment, Military Unit Number 28064, was formed at Vaskovo Airport, Arkhangelsk Oblast, and joined the Army. It was only disbanded in 1994.

== Forces in the 1980s ==
- 21st Air Defence Corps
- 4th Air Defence Division
- 5th Air Defence Division
- 23rd Air Defence Division

Fighter Regiments of the 10th Army PVO 1988

Regiment	Base	Equipment	Remarks
57th Guards Fighter Aviation Regiment	Besovets	Sukhoi Su-15TM	5th Air Defence Division, moved to Norilsk-Alykel 1990; disbanded 10.93. Absorbed 991st IAP 1978.
72nd Guards Fighter Aviation Regiment	Amderma Airport	Mikoyan MiG-31	4th Air Defence Division, honorifics Polotsk Order of Suvorov
174th Guards Fighter Aviation Regiment	Monchegorsk (air base)	Mikoyan MiG-31	21st Air Defence Corps, 2 Gds Naval IAP in 1945
265th Fighter Aviation Regiment	Poduzhemye, Karelian ASSR	Sukhoi Su-15TM	5th Air Defence Division. Disbanded 1994.
431st Fighter Aviation Regiment	Afrikanda	Sukhoi Su-15TM	21st Air Defence Corps
445th Fighter Aviation Regiment	Savatiya (air base) (Kotlas)	Mikoyan MiG-25P	23rd Air Defence Division
518th Fighter Aviation Regiment	Talagi	Mikoyan MiG-31	23rd Air Defence Division
524th Fighter Aviation Regiment	Letneozersk	Mikoyan MiG-25P	23rd Air Defence Division. Disbanded 1994
641st Guards Fighter Aviation Regiment	Rogachevo	Sukhoi Su-27	4th Air Defence Division
941st Fighter Aviation Regiment	Kilpyavr	Sukhoi Su-27	21st Air Defence Corps

The army was disbanded on 1 December 1994.
