= Leonid Ivanov =

Leonid Ivanov may refer to:

- Leonid Ivanov (basketball) (1944–2010), Soviet basketball player
- Leonid Ivanov (botanist), Russian botanist
- Leonid Ivanov (footballer) (1921–1990), Soviet international footballer
- Leonid Ivanov (pilot) (1909–1941), recipient of the Hero of the Soviet Union
- Leonid Ivanov (rower) (1938–2019), Soviet Olympic rower
- Leonid Ivanov (runner) (born 1937), Soviet Olympic runner
- Leonid Ivanov (test pilot) (1950–1980), Soviet cosmonaut
- Leonid Lavrovsky, born Ivanov (1905–1967), Russian ballet choreographer
