= Leonid Ivanov (pilot) =

Soviet aviator

- Born: 8 August 1909; Kashira, Moscow Governorate, Russian Empire
- Died: 27 June 1941 (aged 31); Afrikanda, Murmansk Oblast, Soviet Union
- Military career
- Allegiance: Soviet Union
- Branch: Soviet Air Force
- Service years: 1932–1941
- Rank: Senior lieutenant
- Unit: 147th Fighter Aviation Regiment
- Conflicts: World War II; Winter War; Continuation War; Operation Silver Fox
- Awards: Hero of the Soviet Union; Order of Lenin; Order of the Badge of Honour

Leonid Illarionovich Ivanov (Russian: Леонид Илларионович Иванов; 8 August 1909 – 27 June 1941) was a Soviet Air Force senior lieutenant and posthumous Hero of the Soviet Union. Ivanov was posthumously awarded the title for reportedly shooting down two German aircraft in the first days after Operation Barbarossa, the German invasion of the Soviet Union in World War II, and being killed in a ramming attack (taran) while defending his airfield from a raid.

== Early life ==
Leonid Ivanov was born on 8 August 1909 in Kashira. After graduating from seven years of railway school, Ivanov took adult education courses while working as a laborer at the Kashira tram park. In the summer of 1930 he began working at the Krasny Proletary (Red Proletarian) Machine Tool Factory in Moscow as a milling machine operator. He took night school courses at the STANKIN Machine Tool Institute.

In May 1932, Ivanov was drafted into the Red Army. He graduated from the 7th Stalingrad Military Aviation School in 1935. Ivanov became a fighter pilot in the Leningrad Military District aviation wing and later served in the Far East at Khabarovsk. He was transferred to the 147th Fighter Aviation Regiment at Murmansk and fought in the Winter War between February and March 1940. In February 1941, he was awarded the Order of the Badge of Honour.

== World War II ==
In June 1941 Ivanov was commander of the 4th Squadron in the 147th Fighter Aviation Regiment (ru:147-й истребительный авиационный полк), 1st Mixed Aviation Division (ru:1-я смешанная авиационная дивизия), 14th Army, which was equipped with Polikarpov I-153 and stationed on the Karelian Front (reportedly based at Murmashi) with the task of defending the harbours of Arkhangelsk and Murmansk. On 25 June, he and his wingman Lieutenant Filimonov damaged two Junkers Ju 88s over Kandalaksha, and the next day he damaged a Heinkel He 111 over the same region. On 26 June he shot down a Messerschmitt Bf 110. On 27 June he attacked seven Messerschmitt Bf 109s alone. Ivanov reportedly claimed three victories before he rammed a fourth. These losses cannot be verified in German sources.

Ivanov was buried in Afrikanda. On 22 July 1941, he was posthumously awarded the title Hero of the Soviet Union and the Order of Lenin.

== Legacy ==
A fishing trawler was named after Ivanov.
