= Belushya Bay =

Bay in Novaya Zemlya, Russia

- Губа́ Белу́шья (Russian)
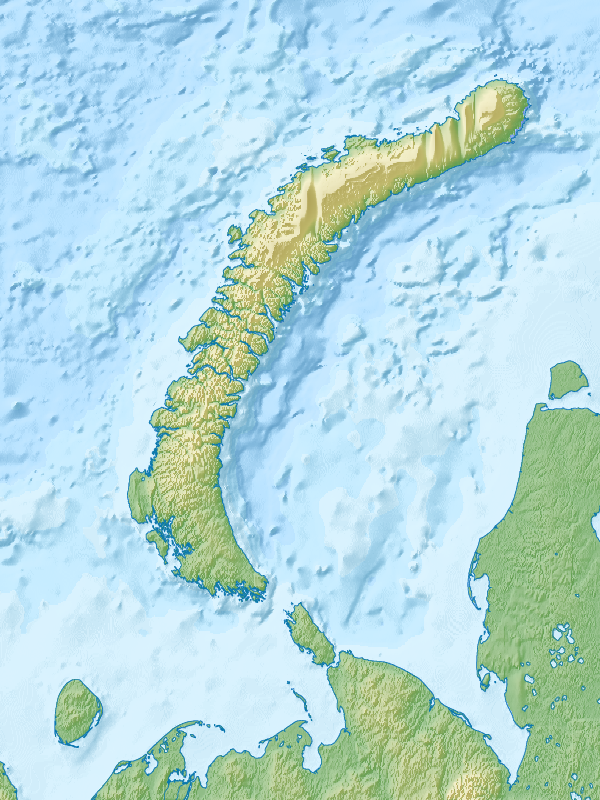
- Location
- Location: Far North
- Coordinates: 71°30′40″N 52°16′30″E
- Ocean/sea sources: Barents Sea
- Basin countries: Russia
- Max. length: 9 km (5.6 mi)
- Max. width: 4 km (2.5 mi)
- Average depth: 100 m (330 ft)
- Settlements: Belushya Guba

Belushya Bay (Russian: Губа́ Белу́шья, lit. beluga whale bay) is a bay on Yuzhny Island in Novaya Zemlya, Russia.

The bay is located on the south-west coast of the island. The settlement Belushya Guba, of the same name, is situated on its shores.
