= 1st Air Defence Division (Russia) =

Russian Aerospace Forces formation

1st Air Defence Division (2014–present) 1st Aerospace Defence Brigade (2009–2014) 21st Air Defence Corps (1960–2009) Northern Air Defence Corps (1957–1960)
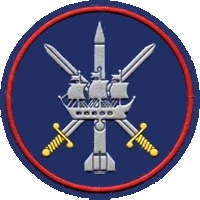
- Shoulder sleeve insignia of the 1st Aerospace Defence Brigade
- Active: 1957–present
- Country: Soviet Union (until 1991); Russia (since 1992)
- Branch: Soviet Air Defence Forces; Russian Aerospace Defence Forces; Russian Aerospace Forces
- Type: Air defence
- Part of: Northern Fleet
- Garrison/HQ: Severomorsk

The 1st Air Defence Division is a military formation of the Russian Aerospace Forces. It traces its history to a corps of the Soviet Air Defence Forces, and later the Russian Air Force. The corps was headquartered at Severomorsk and was part of the 10th Air Defence Army from 1960 to 1994. It was formed as the Northern Air Defence Corps in 1957 and was assigned the designation "21st" three years later. It became a brigade in 2009 and was converted into a division in 2014.

== History ==
The corps was originally established as the Northern Air Defence Corps in February 1957 with headquarters at Severomorsk, Murmansk Oblast, part of the Northern Air Defence Army. On 21 March 1960 it gained a combined-arms number as the 21st Air Defence Corps, and at the same time the Northern Air Defence Army became the 10th Air Defence Army.

The corps included an anti-aircraft missile regiment with a headquarters in Murmansk (the only military unit in this city), the 5th Radio Technical Brigade with headquarters in Severomorsk, and fighter air regiments based at the Klip-yavr, Afrikanda and Monchegorsk airfields.

In April 1978, corps commander Vladimir Tsarkov ordered an Su-15 pilot to shoot down Korean Air Lines Flight 902 after the plane failed to respond to repeated orders to land, and approached the Soviet border with Finland. The Su-15 opened fire, forcing the plane to descend, and killing two of the 109 passengers and crew members aboard Flight 902. The plane made an emergency landing on the frozen Korpijärvi Lake near the Finnish border.

The 10th Air Defence Army disbanded in December 1994, and the corps transferred to the 6th Separate Air Defence Army, which became the 6th Air and Air Defence Forces Army in 1998. In 2009, the formation became the 1st Aerospace Defence Brigade, and the 6th Army became the 1st Air and Air Defence Forces Command. In December 2014, the brigade was converted, along like other aerospace defence brigades, into the 1st Air Defence Division, and became part of the Arctic Joint Strategic Command. The division became part of the Northern Fleet by early 2017.

== Composition ==
In 1988, the corps included:

- 223rd Communication Center (Severomorsk, Murmansk Oblast)
- 174th Guards Fighter Aviation Regiment PVO (Monchegorsk, Murmansk Oblast)
- 431st Fighter Aviation Regiment PVO (Afrikanda, Murmansk Oblast)
- 941st Fighter Aviation Regiment PVO (Kilp-Yavr, Murmansk Oblast)
- 39th Anti-Aircraft Missile Brigade (Olenegorsk, Murmansk Oblast)
- 42nd Anti-Aircraft Missile Brigade (Polyarny, Murmansk Oblast)
- 116th Guards Anti-Aircraft Missile Brigade (Bolshoye Ozerko, Murmansk Oblast)
- 224th Anti-Aircraft Missile Brigade (Gremikha, Murmansk Oblast)
- 864th Anti-Aircraft Missile Regiment (Murmansk, Murmansk Oblast)
- 5th Radio-Technical Brigade (Severomorsk, Murmansk Oblast)
- 502nd independent Electronic Warfare Battalion (Kildinstroy, Murmansk Oblast)
