= Aufklärungsgruppe 11 =

Reconnaissance Group 11
- Aufklärungsgruppe 11
- Active: 1939–1945
- Country: Nazi Germany
- Branch: Luftwaffe
- Type: reconnaissance
- Garrison/HQ: Großenhain

Aircraft flown
- Reconnaissance: Ju 88; Ju 188

Aufklärungsgruppe 11 (11th Reconnaissance Group) was a Luftwaffe air reconnaissance group that participated in the Axis invasion of Yugoslavia during World War II.

The Aufklärungsgruppe was based in Großenhain prior to World War II. It was made up of a Gruppenstab (headquarters unit) and five Staffeln (squadrons).

== 1.(H)/11 ==
During the Invasion of Poland, the Staffel flew reconnaissance missions for the 10th Panzer Division with a Henschel Hs 126 and three Heinkel He 46 close reconnaissance aircraft.

== 2.(F)/11 ==
During the Invasion of Poland, the Staffel flew reconnaissance missions for Army Group South with a Dornier Do 17 F.

== 3.(F)/11 ==
During the Invasion of Poland, the Staffel flew reconnaissance missions for Army Group North with a Do 17 F. In 1941 during the Balkans campaign, the unit supported the 2nd Army. On 9 August 1943, the Staffel became the 5. Staffel of Zerstörergeschwader 76 (ZG 76—76th Destroyer Wing) which was fighting in Defense of the Reich.

== 4.(F)/11 ==
During the Invasion of Poland, the Staffel flew reconnaissance missions for 4th Army in northern Poland. In 1941 during Operation Barbarossa, the German invasion of the Soviet Union, 4.(F)/11 was deployed over the combat area of 9th Army which was part of Army Group Center.

== 5.(H)/11 (Pz) ==
The Staffel was created in 1940 and equipped with the Hs 126. During Barbarossa, the unit was linked to the 11th Panzer Division which was fighting in the southern sector of the Eastern Front.
