= Kolskaya GMK =

- City: Monchegorsk, Russia
- Founded: 1957; 68 years ago
- Home arena: DYuSSh-3 Stadium

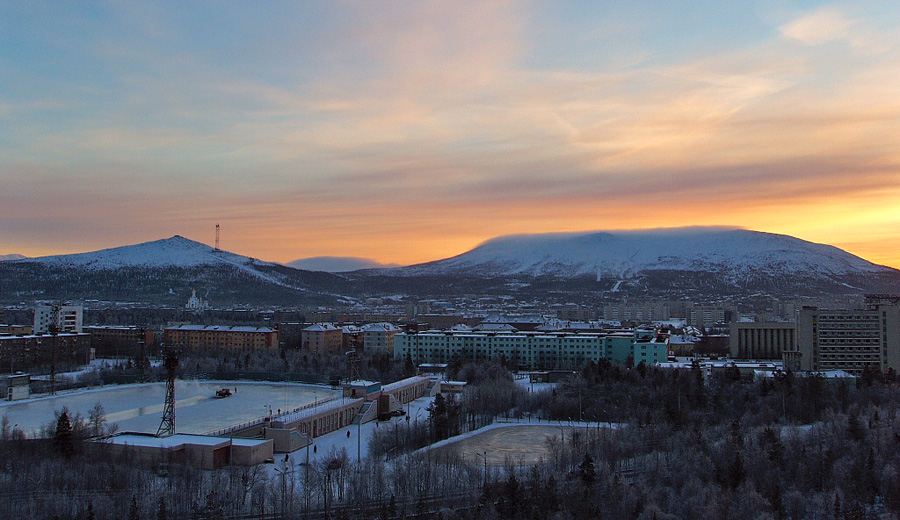
The stadium of Kolskaya GMK

KhK Kolskaya GMK (Russian: ХК «Кольская ГМК») is a bandy club in Monchegorsk, Russia. The club was founded in 1957 and has earlier been playing in the Russian Bandy Super League, the top-tier of Russian bandy. The home games are played at DYuSSh-3 Stadium in Monchegorsk. The club colours are white and blue.
