= Alexander Kaletski =

American artist

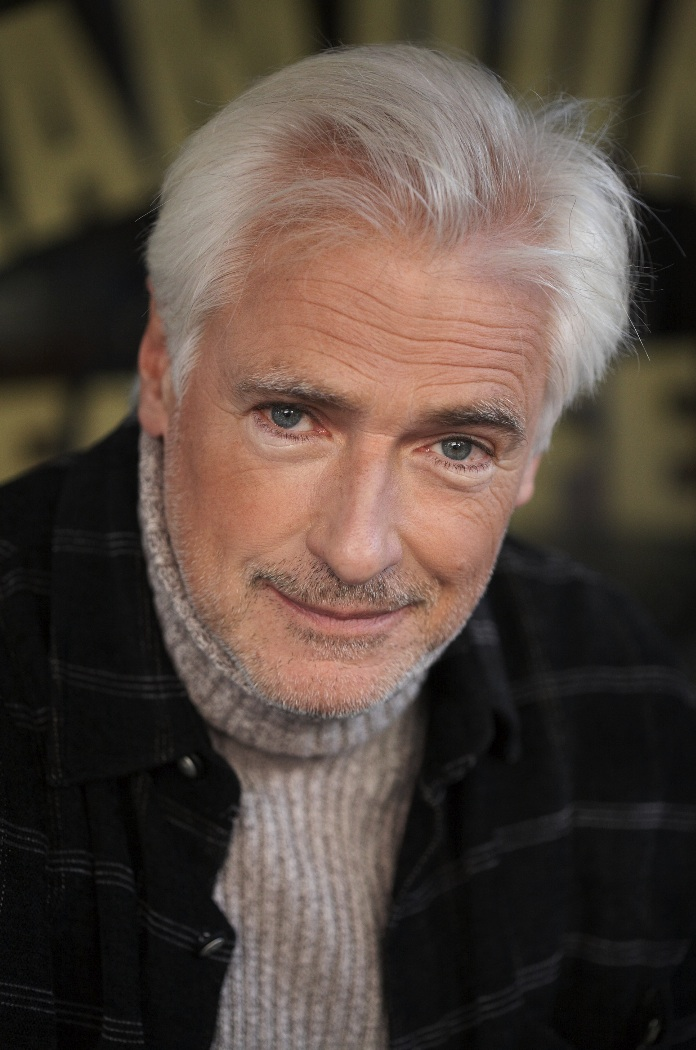
- Alexander Kaletski, 2009
- Born: Monchegorsk, Russia
- Known for: Painting
- Website: http://www.alexanderkaletski.com

Alexander Kaletski is an American contemporary artist. Kaletski became famous with Cardboard paintings he created by using cardboard boxes he finds on the streets of New York. He works in the varieties of medias and styles. Kaletski makes oil paintings, collages, sculptures and videos.

In 2012 he wrote and directed and independent film "Song of Silence". He wrote the play Darkness of Light', co-directing it with Michael Mailer off-Broadway in 2023.

== Life ==
Born in Soviet Russia, Kaletski studied acting in Moscow from 1965 to 1969 and went on to a highly successful career on stage, television, and film productions. At the same time he held underground art shows and performed songs of protest. In 1975, fleeing political prosecution and the threat of arrest by the KGB, artist and author Kaletski left the USSR. He went first to Vienna for a week, then to Rome for a month, and finally New York where he initially lived in a welfare hotel, then a room in Queens and finally an East Side studio he still uses today. When he came to America, Kaletski gave a nationwide concert tour of his Moscow underground songs, eventually appearing on the Merv Griffin television show. He taught Russian, designed fashion fabrics, illustrated books. In 1985 he published semi-autobiographical novel "Metro: A Novel of the Russian Underground" (Viking) which became an international bestseller. This year Kaletski has finished two novels – Darkness of Light and Bible Thief.

== Career ==
Kaletski's first love was always painting. As a child he won several art competitions. At the time, in Soviet Russia only officially designated artists were allowed to legally sell their work, which was forbidden to be abstract, surreal or critical of Soviet life. Kaletski refused to paint in a style of socialist realism. But he painted anyway and went underground, where he found a thriving culture that provided him with an audience for his art and songs. In the Moscow underground Kaletski was working on the series of watercolors which he was selling to the foreigners on the black market.

When he left the USSR, Kaletski carried with him these watercolors. During that time in the Soviet Union, the works of unsanctioned or "non conformist" painters were forbidden and exhibiting as an outsider was considered a serious crime. Forgoing other necessary belongings, the artist had to pay for the release of his own pieces. When Kaletski arrived in America his watercolors were immediately exhibited in many universities around the United States, constituting some of the earliest non-conformist art to be viewed in America. His works surprised audiences as they showed unexpectedly that behind the Iron Curtain existed not only gloom and sadness, but also humor, beauty and hope.

During his first years in America, as a struggling artist without money to buy paint or a canvas, Kaletski was drawn to the thousands of cardboard boxes that litter the streets of New York City. For the artist, those boxes provided unique, if unusual, components for the creative process. Starting from commercial cardboard packaging he collaged the materials adding line and color, resulting in artwork considered provocative and most often, amusing.

Kaletski was the inaugural exhibition for Dillon Gallery when it opened in Soho in 1994. In the last seventeen years the gallery has presented numerous exhibitions of the artist's works, the most acclaimed being his Cardboard People exhibition, which opened in 1996. The show became an instant success. Since then Kaletski has regularly exhibited his paintings in museum exhibitions in the US and abroad (Austria, England, the Netherlands, Switzerland, Russia, and Japan) presenting to the audience a variety of styles, techniques and concepts.

== Exhibitions ==
=== Solo exhibitions ===
- 2023 – "Alexander Kaletski – Box-Cutter" – Anna Zorina Gallery, Los Angeles, California
- 2021 – "Ricochet" – Anna Zorina Gallery, New York City
- 2021 – "La Vie En Blue" – De Jalon Fine Arts, Mexico City, Mexico
- 2019 – "Lacey Lives" – Anna Zorina Gallery, New York City
- 2018 – "Breaking The Wall" – B-Monster, Shanghai, China
- 2017 – "This Side Up" – Anna Zorina Gallery, New York City
- 2016 – "Musas De Carton" – De Jalon Fine Arts, Mexico City, Mexico
- 2016 – "Out of the Blue" – Anna Zorina Gallery, New York City
- 2015 – "Inspirations" – (Le) Poisson Rouge, New York City
- 2014 – "Red Carpet" – Anna Zorina Gallery, New York City
- 2014 – "Red Carpet" – Mary Boone Gallery, New York City
- 2013 – "Handle with Care" – Anna Zorina Gallery, New York City
- 2012 – "Cardboard Cafe" – Dillon Gallery, New York City
- 2012 – "Beach Shack" – Art Southampton, Southampton, New York
- 2012 – "Cardboard People Around the World" – MAD, Saint Gervais, France
- 2012 – "Designer's Trash" – Bonbright Gallery, Los Angeles, California
- 2012 – "Cardboard People Around the World" – Valette Foundation, Martigny, Switzerland
- 2011 – "Contemplation" – Dillon Gallery, New York City
- 2011 – "Cardboard People Around the World" – Looshaus, Raiffeisen Bank, Vienna, Austria
- 2010 – "Carton of Eden" – Dillon Gallery, New York City
- 2010 – "From New York to Tokyo" – Kato Gallery, Tokyo, Japan
- 2008 – "Wet Dreams" – Dillon Gallery, New York City
- 2008 – "Cardboard People" – Lasandr-art Gallery, Minsk, Belarus
- 2007 – "Cardboard Castle" – Dillon Gallery, New York City
- 2007 – "Familiar Strangers" – Nelson Macker Gallery, Port Chester, Connecticut
- 2005 – "White Rain" – Spike Gallery, New York City
- 2003 – "Headlines" – Dillon Gallery, Oyster Bay, New York
- 2003 – "American Breakfast" – Gomez Gallery, Baltimore, Maryland
- 2002 – "Cardboard Museum" – Nassau County Museum of Art, Roslyn Harbor, New York
- 2002 – "Out of the Box" – Dillon Gallery, Oyster Bay, New York
- 2002 – "Cardboard Box" – The Aldrich Contemporary Art Museum, Ridgefield, Connecticut
- 2000 – "Art and Wine" – The Hague, The Netherlands
- 2000 – "Women Only" – Dillon Gallery, New York City
- 1999 – "Paper Heroes" – The Museum of Contemporary Art, Minsk, Belarus
- 1998 – "Wallpaper Heroes" – Dillon Gallery, New York City
- 1997 – "Nude Colony" – Dillon Gallery, New York City
- 1996 – "Cardboard People" – Dillon Gallery, New York City
- 1996 – "Split Personality" – Gwenda Jay Gallery, Chicago, Illinois
- 1995 – "Dead Ancestors" – Dillon Gallery, New York City
- 1994 – "Dreams of a Window Cleaner" – Dillon Gallery, New York City
- 1993 – "People in Boxes" – Z Gallery, New York City
- 1989 – "Rectangles" – Andre Zarre Gallery, New York City
- 1987 – "Angular People" – Schiller-Wapner Gallery, New York City
- 1977 – Princeton University, Princeton, New Jersey
- 1976 – Indiana University, Bloomington, Indiana
- 1976 – Columbia University, New York City
- 1975 – Saratoga Art Center, Saratoga, New York
