= 65th Air Army =

65th Air Army DA (1949–1953) 3rd Air Army DA (1946–1949) 7th Air Army (1942–1946)
- Active: 1942–1953
- Country: Soviet Union
- Branch: Soviet Air Forces
- Garrison/HQ: Khabarovsk (from 1946)
- Engagements: World War II

Commanders
- Notable commanders: Ivan Sokolov

The 65th Air Army DA was an air army of the Soviet Air Forces.

The army was formed in November 1942 from the Air Force of the Karelian Front as the 7th Air Army and provided air support for the front until the end of World War II. Postwar, it was transferred to Khabarovsk and became the 3rd Air Army DA (Long-range aviation), controlling Soviet strategic bomber forces for the rest of its existence. In 1949 it was renumbered the 65th Air Army DA. The army was disbanded in mid-1953.

== History ==
=== World War II ===
The army was formed on 10 November 1942 from the Air Force of the Karelian Front as the 7th Air Army, commanded by Major General Ivan Sokolov. The army provided air support for the front during the war. Before the beginning of the Svir-Petrozavodsk Offensive in June 1944, the air army carried out an air bombardment of over 3,000 aircraft on the north bank of the Svir River. In May 1945 it included the 257th and 324th Fighter Aviation Divisions, the 280th Assault Aviation Division, the 80th and 114th Guards Bomber Aviation Regiments, the 679th and 716th Night-Bomber Aviation Regiments, and the 118th and 119th Separate Reconnaissance Aviation Squadrons.

=== Cold War ===
In the immediate postwar period, between 1945 and 1946, most of its units were transferred to other armies. On 9 April 1946, the army was renamed the 3rd Air Army of Long Range Aviation (DA) and transferred to Khabarovsk. It included the 6th (Smirnykh) and 19th Bomber Aviation Corps (Vozdvizhenka), each with two bomber aviation divisions. On 10 January 1949, the army was renumbered the 65th Air Army DA, and its 6th and 19th Corps became the 74th and 84th Bomber Aviation Corps, respectively. On 9 March, Colonel General Vasily Zhdanov took command of the army. In April 1951, he was replaced by Colonel General Georgy Tupikov. In July 1951, the 74th Corps and its divisions were transferred to the 50th Air Army DA. The army was disbanded in mid-1953, and the 84th Corps became a separate unit.

== Commanders ==
The army was commanded by the following officers.

- Major General (promoted to lieutenant general and colonel general) Ivan Sokolov (10 November 1942 – March 1946)
- Colonel General Vasily Zhdanov (9 March 1949 – April 1951)
- Colonel General Georgy Tupikov (April 1951 – mid-1953)
