= Graham Bell Island =

Island in Franz Josef archipelago

Graham Bell
Native name: Остров Греэм-Белл
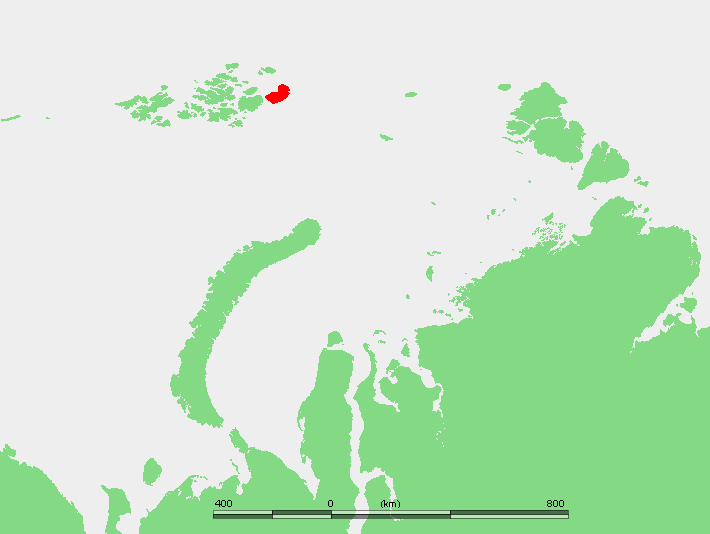
- Location of Graham Bell Island in the Franz Josef Archipelago

- Location within Russia

Geography
- Location: Kara Sea/Barents Sea, Arctic Ocean
- Coordinates: 80.866389°N 64.289167°E
- Archipelago: Franz Josef Land
- Area: 1,557 km^{2} (601 sq mi)
- Highest elevation: 509 m (1670 ft)
- Highest point: Kupol Vetrenyy

Administration
- Russia

Graham Bell Island (Russian: Остров Греэм-Белл, Ostrov Greem-Bell) is an island in the Franz Josef Archipelago in the Arctic Ocean, and is administratively part of Arkhangelsk Oblast, Russia.

== Geography ==
Graham Bell Island is one of the largest islands of the group. It lies east of Wilczek Land, separated from it by a narrow sound known as Morgan Sound (Пролив Моргана; Proliv Morgana). It is also the easternmost island of Franz Josef Land. Cape Kohlsaat, the easternmost point of the archipelago at 81°14′N, 65°10′E, lies on Graham Bell Island's eastern shore. Cape Kohlsaat marks the northwesternmost corner of the Kara Sea and is a significant geographical landmark, and it is partly glacierized.

The highest point of Graham Bell Island, 509 m (1,670 ft), is the summit of Kupol Vetrenyy (Купол Ветреный) "Windy Dome", a large ice dome covering the western part of the island.

This island was named after inventor Alexander Graham Bell. Graham Bell Island should not be confused with the smaller Bell Island which is also part of the Franz Josef Archipelago and is named after the shape, not the person.

== History ==
Graham Bell Island was discovered on 2 May 1899 by a sledging party of the Wellman expedition composed of Evelyn Briggs Baldwin, Daniel Johansen, Emil Ellefsen, Olaf Ellefsen, and Paul Bjørvig.

It is home to a Cold War outpost and to the airfield Greem Bell (81°09′N 64°17′E) on the Northeastern end of the island. It is the largest airfield in the archipelago. It has a runway 2,100 metres (6,900 ft) long. Russian cargo and fighter aircraft have regularly landed here since the 1950s. The runway was usable only in the 8 months of the year with sufficiently frozen ground. Before it was shut down, it was also used for tourist helicopter trips around the Russian arctic as a stopover and refueling base. The base was shut down completely in 1994. It began falling into ruins and was subsequently closed to normal visitors. In May 2012, the Russian Air Force announced it would reopen Graham Bell Airfield as part of a series of reopenings of air bases in the Arctic.

== Adjacent islands ==
- Graham Bell Island's northern shore is fringed by clusters of very small islets.
- Ostrov Trëkhluchevoy – lies off its western shore at 80.9517°N 63.0792°E and is only 2 km in length.
- Ostrov Udachnyy – is part of a cluster of islets located along the NW shores 81.1417°N 64.1458°E

== See also ==
- List of islands of Russia
- List of glaciers in Russia
