= 1st Air and Air Defence Forces Command =

The 1st Air and Air Defence Forces Command was a command of the Russian Air Force from 2009-2015. It was located at Voronezh and supervised air force operations in the Western Military District. It was created on 1 December 2009.

On 1 August 2015, it was reorganized as the 6th Air and Air Defence Forces Army.

It comprised the:

- 1st Air-Space Defense Brigade (Severomorsk)
- 2nd Air-Space Defense Brigade (St. Petersburg)
- 6961st Aviation Base (Petrozavodsk Airport) (Su-27)
- 6964th Aviation Base (Monchegorsk, Murmansk Oblast) (Su-24M, Su-24MP)
- 6965th Aviation Base (Viaz’ma, Smolensk Oblast) (Mi-8, Mi-24)
- 7000th Aviation Base (Voronezh) (Su-24M, Su-24MP, Su-34)
