= Korean Air Lines Flight 902 =

1978 aircraft shootdown over the Soviet Union

- The aircraft after landing in the Soviet Union, with visible damage to its left wing

Shootdown
- Date: 20 April 1978
- Summary: Shot down by Soviet Union
- Site: near Loukhi, Karelian ASSR, Russian SFSR, Soviet Union; 66°02′54″N 33°04′14″E

Aircraft
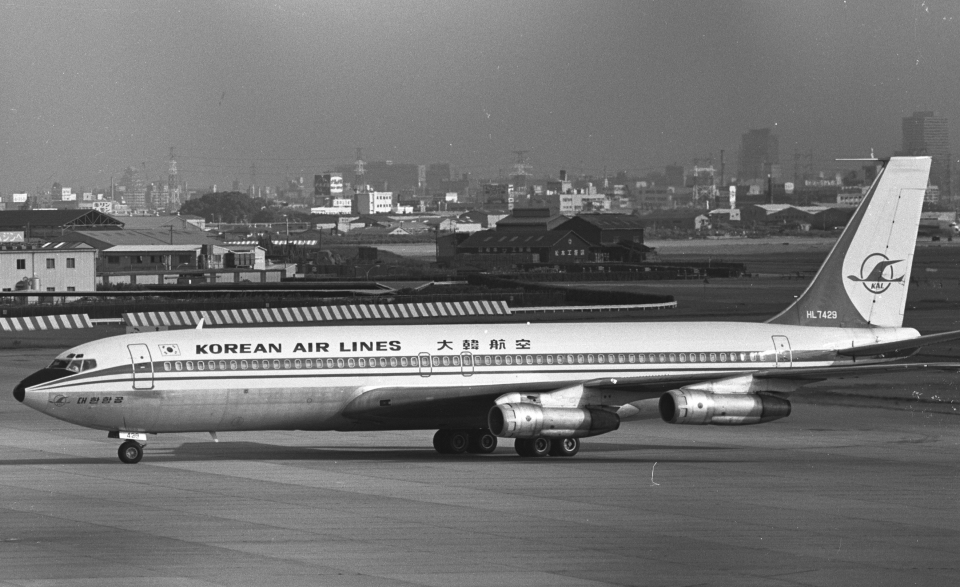
- HL7429, the aircraft involved, seen in 1977
- Aircraft type: Boeing 707-321B
- Operator: Korean Air Lines
- IATA flight No.: KE902
- ICAO flight No.: KAL902
- Call sign: KOREAN AIR 902
- Registration: HL7429
- Flight origin: Orly Airport, Paris, France
- Stopover: Anchorage International Airport, Anchorage, Alaska, United States
- Destination: Gimpo International Airport, Seoul, South Korea
- Occupants: 109
- Passengers: 97
- Crew: 12
- Fatalities: 2
- Injuries: 88
- Survivors: 107

Korean Air Lines Flight 902 was a scheduled Korean Air Lines flight from Paris to Seoul via Anchorage. On 20 April 1978, the Soviet air defense shot down the aircraft serving the flight, a Boeing 707, near Murmansk, Soviet Union, after the aircraft violated Soviet airspace.

Flight 902 had veered off course over the Arctic Ocean and entered Soviet airspace near the Kola Peninsula, whereupon it was intercepted and fired upon by a Soviet fighter jet. The incident killed two of the 109 passengers and crew members aboard and forced the plane to make an emergency landing on the frozen Korpijärvi Lake.

== Events ==
Flight 902 departed from Paris, France, at 13:39 local time on a course to Seoul, South Korea. The plane's only scheduled stop was in Anchorage, Alaska, the US, where it would refuel and proceed to Seoul, avoiding Soviet airspace. It was commanded by Captain Kim Chang-kyu (46), with Co-pilot Cha Soon-do, & Flight Engineer Lee Khun-shik, making up the 3 crew on the flight deck. The aircraft made regular radio check-ins as it flew northwest, the last of which, five hours and twenty-one minutes after takeoff, placed it near CFS Alert on Ellesmere Island. The aircraft's flight path took it almost directly over the North Magnetic Pole, causing large errors in the aircraft's magnetic compass-based navigation systems. Its course then turned to the southeast and it flew over the Barents Sea, and into Soviet airspace, reaching the Soviet coast an estimated three hours and 1,500 miles (2,400 km) after its southward turn.

=== Soviet air defence ===
Soviet air defence radar spotted the plane at 20:54 (8:54 PM), when the plane was approximately 400 kilometres (250 mi) away from Soviet territorial waters. At 21:19 (9:19 PM), the plane entered Soviet airspace. As the plane did not respond to multiple requests from the ground, a Sukhoi Su-15 interceptor, piloted by Alexander Bosov, was dispatched to intercept the airliner. Having approached KAL902, Bosov waggled the Su-15's wings multiple times: waggling wings is the international signal for the airliner to follow the interceptor. Instead, KAL902 made a 90-degree turn towards the Soviet-Finnish border. Bosov reported the attempted escape from Soviet airspace to the Air Defence Command Officer Vladimir Tsarkov, and the latter, based on internal instructions, commanded Bosov to shoot down KAL902.

According to Kim's account of the attack, the interceptor approached his aircraft from the right side rather than the left as required by International Civil Aviation Organization (ICAO) regulation. Kim decreased his speed and turned on the navigation lights, indicating that he was ready to follow the Soviet fighter for landing.

According to Soviet reports, the airliner repeatedly ignored commands to follow the interceptor. Flight 902's co-pilot Cha said that the crew had attempted to communicate with the interceptor via radio, but did not receive a response.

Bosov tried to convince his superiors that the plane was not a military threat, but after receiving orders to shoot it down at 21:42 (9:42 PM), he fired an R-60 missile. The missile flew past the target. A second missile, however, hit the left wing, knocking off approximately 4 metres (13 ft) of it. The missile also punctured the fuselage, causing a rapid decompression, and jamming one of the plane's four turbines. A Korean passenger died in the missile strike, which also wounded several others.

After being hit, the airliner quickly descended from an altitude of 9,000 m (30,000 ft). It fell into a cloud, disappearing from Soviet air defence radars. Soviets mistook the part of the wing that had fallen off Flight 902 for a cruise missile and dispatched another Su-15 interceptor to fire at it. Bosov's Su-15 had to return to the airbase due to low fuel.

=== Emergency landing ===
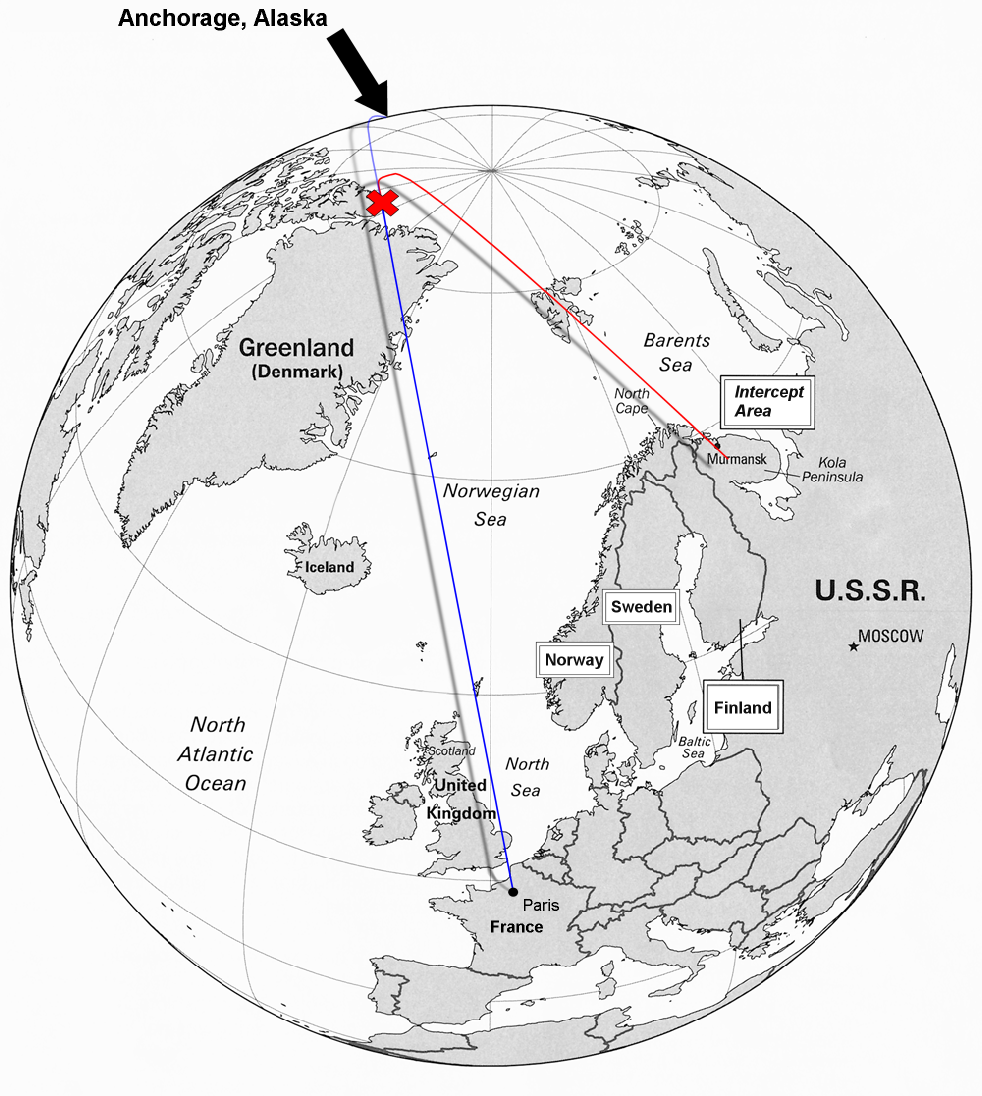
KAL Flight 902's flight plan (in blue, Paris to Anchorage to Seoul) and deviation from the plan (in red, having turned southeast when over Ellesmere Island)

Accounts of the time between the missile strike and Flight 902's landing differ. According to the Soviet media, the airliner flew across the whole Kola Peninsula at a low altitude for about 40 minutes, searching for a place to land. After several unsuccessful attempts at landing, Kim brought the plane down on the ice of the frozen Korpijärvi Lake in Karelian ASSR, located approximately 140 kilometres (87 mi) from the Finnish border. According to the diary of a passenger on board Flight 902, an account supported by other passengers, an hour and 40 minutes elapsed before the landing. About two hours after the crash landing, Soviet troops reached the plane to begin the rescue effort, by which time Japanese passenger Yoshitako Sugano had died.

Finnish sources stated that Soviet air defense did not have any information on the plane's whereabouts after it disappeared from the radar. However, Tsarkov stated that another Soviet pilot, Anatoly Kerefov, had located Flight 902 and led it to the Afrikanda air base. Tsarkov went on to say that Kim fell behind and landed on the lake. Kerefov said he practically forced the plane to land on the ice of Korpijärvi.

=== Rescue of survivors ===
Soviet helicopters rescued the survivors and transported them to the city of Kem in Karelia. The passengers were quartered in the garrison's Officers' Lodge.

On 22 April, the survivors, except the pilot and navigator, were transported via Aeroflot from Kem to Murmansk, then by Pan American World Airways to Helsinki-Vantaa Airport in Finland, where a Korean Air Lines aircraft departed on 23 April for Seoul with the group of Flight 902 survivors and the bodies of those killed.

On 29 April, the pilot and navigator of Flight 902 were released. TASS, the official news agency of the Soviet Union, said that they had confessed to violating Soviet airspace and disregarding orders from the intercepting aircraft to land. According to TASS, the pair had appealed for clemency to the Presidium of the Supreme Soviet, which pardoned and expelled them.

The Soviet Union billed South Korea US$100,000 ($493,600 in 2025 prices) for its caretaking of the passengers; however, the bill was never paid by South Korea.

== Aftermath ==
The Soviet Union refused to cooperate with international experts while they investigated the incident and did not provide any data from the plane's "black box". The airplane was dismantled and all equipment transferred by helicopter onto a barge in Kandalaksha Gulf. The deputy chief commanding officer of Soviet air defense, Yevgeny Savitsky, personally inspected the aircraft's cockpit.

The crew of Flight 902 blamed the compass, which had started working incorrectly, due to the original flight path of KAL 902 passing close by the magnetic North Pole. Passengers said that Kim had told them upon landing that he had suspected the aircraft's navigation equipment was working incorrectly, but had followed it anyway. After being released from Soviet custody, navigator Lee said similarly that the directional gyro had malfunctioned.

== Maps ==
Location of the accident and origination, stopover, and destination airports

== See also ==
- Aviation safety
- List of airliner shootdown incidents
- Korean Air Lines Flight 007: Another Korean Airlines plane incident only 5 years after Korean Air Lines 902
