= Rogachevo, Arkhangelsk Oblast =

Settlement in Novaya Zemlya, Russia

Coordinates: 71°36′59″N 52°24′38″E

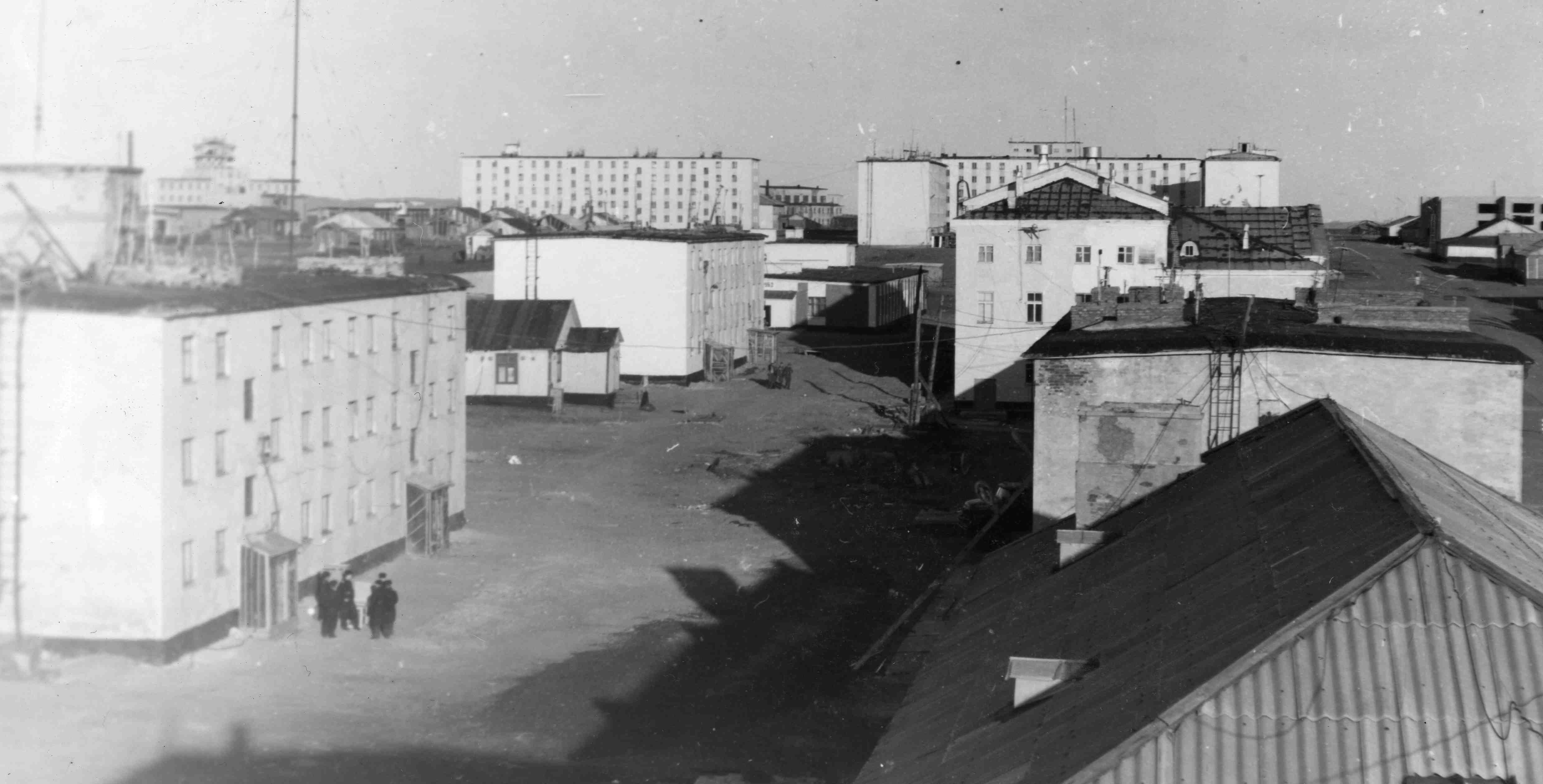
The village in the 1980s

Rogachevo (Russian: Рогачёво) is a settlement on Novaya Zemlya's Yuzhny Island in Russia's Arkhangelsk Oblast. It lies approximately 8 kilometers (5.5 mi) northeast of Belushya Guba and is home to Rogachevo Air Base. As of 2010, Rogachevo had a population of 457. In late 2014, Rogachevo was named as one of the points-based forces of the Joint Strategic Command "North".
