= Belushya Guba =

Belushya Guba Бeлyшья Гyбa
- Work settlement
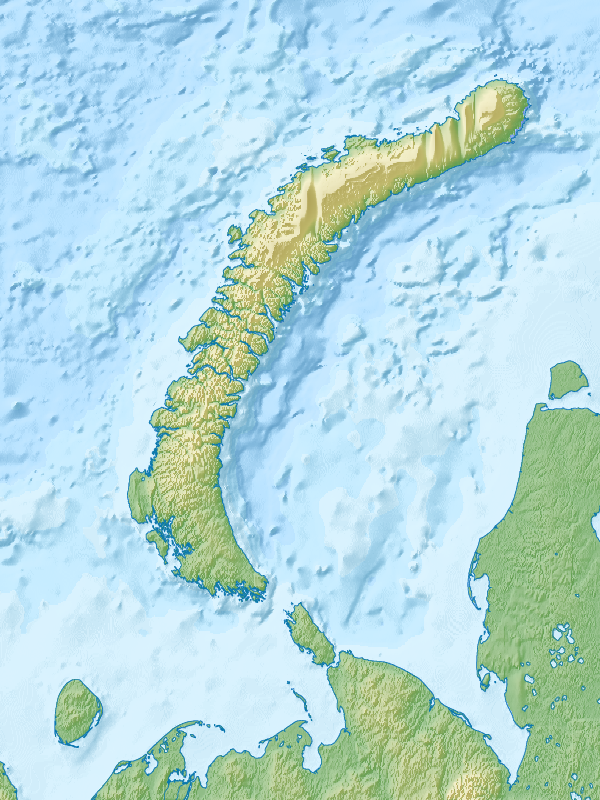
- Belushya Guba shown on a map of Novaya Zemlya
- Interactive map of Belushya Guba
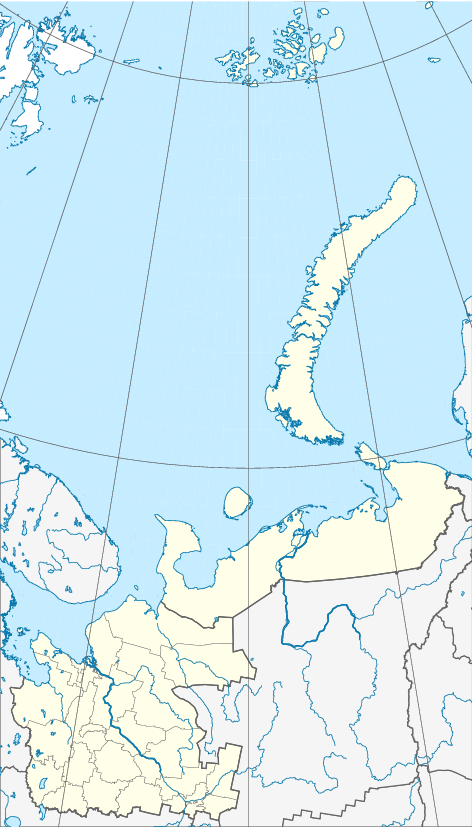
- Location of Belushya Guba Belushya Guba (Russia)
- Coordinates: 71°32′44″N 52°19′13″E
- Country: Russia
- Federal subject: Arkhangelsk Oblast
- Administrative district: Novaya Zemlya District
- Founded: 1897
- Urban-type settlement status since: March 2005
- Elevation: 7 m (23 ft)

Population (2010 Census)
  - Total: 1,972
  - Estimate (2023): 2,060 (+4.5%)

Municipal status
  - Urban okrug: Novaya Zemlya Urban Okrug
- Time zone: UTC+3 (MSK)
- Postal code: 163055
- OKTMO ID: 11712000051

Belushya Guba (Russian: Белу́шья Губа́; Russian pronunciation: [bʲɪˈɫuʂjə ɣʊˈba], lit. 'beluga whale bay'), also known as Belushye (Белушье), is a work settlement and the administrative center of Novaya Zemlya District of Arkhangelsk Oblast, Russia, located on the Gusinaya Zemlya peninsula of the Yuzhny Island of the Novaya Zemlya arctic archipelago. Its population was reported as 1,972 (2010 census), a decline of more than 20% from 2,622 (2002 census). It is the largest settlement on the island, and is the main permanent settlement of the island territory of Novaya Zemlya.

Historical population
Year	Pop.	±%
2002	2,622	—
2010	1,972	−24.8%
2021	1,972	+0.0%
Source: Census data

A large proportion of its population is made up of military personnel associated with the nuclear test sites located on the island. About 9 kilometers (5.6 mi) northeast of Belushya Guba is the settlement of Rogachevo, the second largest in the archipelago, along with the Rogachevo air base.

The whole Novaya Zemlya archipelago, including Belushya Guba, is an area of restricted access (formally, as part of border security zone), and a special permit is needed to visit.

== History ==
Upon visiting Novaya Zemlya in 1894, Arkhangelsk Governor Aleksandr Engelgardt decided to create a new encampment. In 1896, an expedition conducted a survey of the west coast of Novaya Zemlya. The following year Belushya Guba was founded.

During World War II, Belushya Guba was a focus of both German and Soviet attention. German U-boats used Belushya Bay as a resting area in 1941. The German military contemplated establishing a weather station or other land-based facilities nearby, but increasing Soviet military presence in the area prevented that. On July 27, 1942, German submarine U-601 shelled Malye Karmakuly near Belushia Bay, damaging seaplanes, living huts, and storage huts. U-601 torpedoed and sank the Soviet merchant ship Krestianin, carrying coal, as it neared Belushya Guba. On August 19, U-209 tried to enter Belushya Guba, but was detected and attacked by a motor boat and two Soviet minesweepers. U-209 departed when a Soviet coast guard ship and icebreaker SKR-18 (formerly Fedor Litke) approached from Belushuya Guba. Belushya Guba was used as an anchorage by Russian convoys between the Barents Sea and Arkhangelsk. A Soviet naval base was established in Belushya Guba in 1944.

The settlement started to flourish in 1954, when Novaya Zemlya became established as a nuclear test site. In 1956, the whole indigenous population of Novaya Zemlya, mostly Nenets, were evicted from the islands and then resettled.

The settlement gained international attention when it was overrun by polar bears in 2019.

== Geography and climate ==
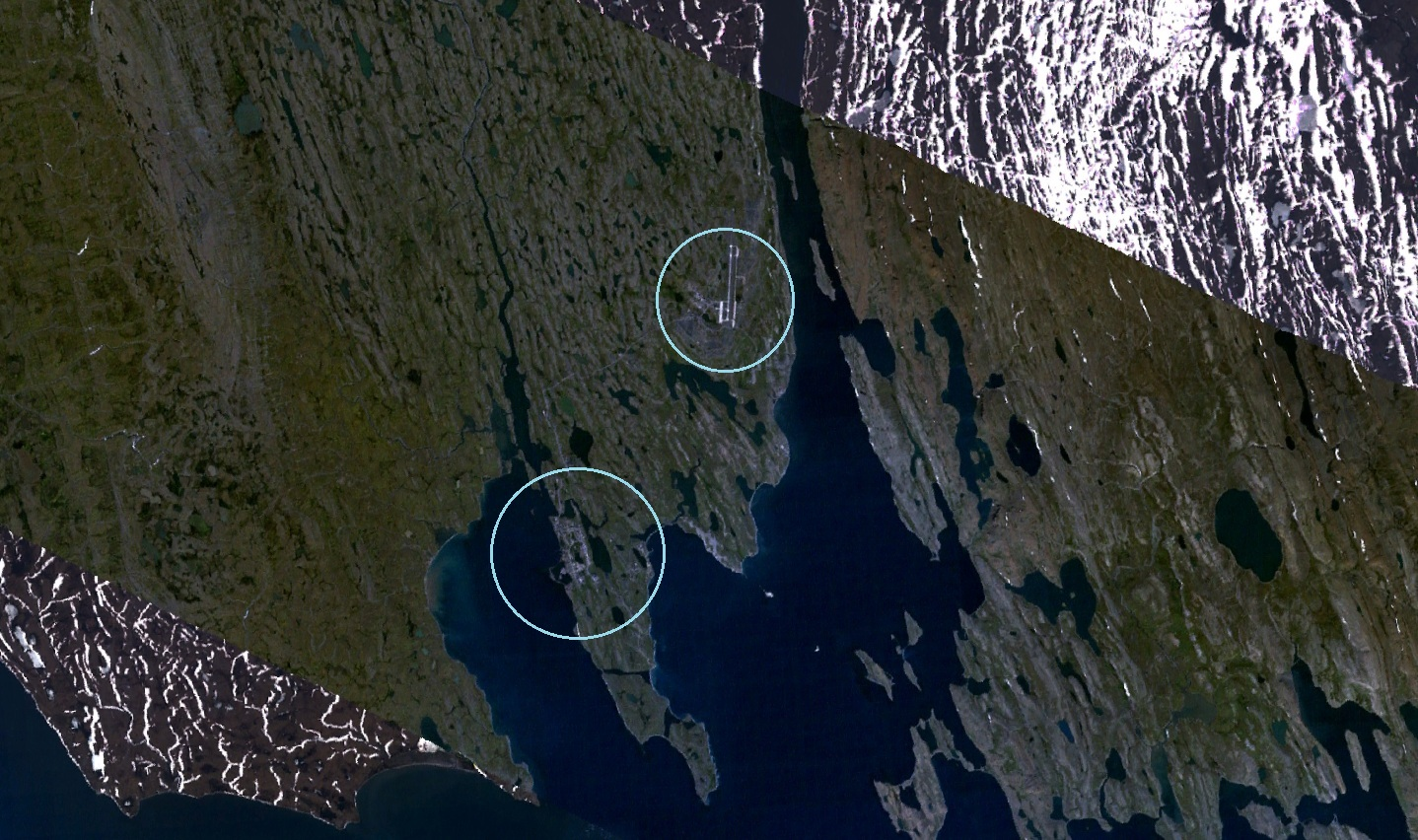
NASA space shot, with Belushya Guba circled at bottom center, and the military base with its airport at upper center

Belushya Guba is located on a deep bay with the same name, within a geographical area that is influenced by warm ocean currents. The natural conditions allow year-round sailing of all types and classes of vessels with minimal cost for icebreaking support. The bay is well protected from high surf and drifting ice.

The temperature in Belushya Guba ranges from −12 °C (10 °F) to +10 °C (50 °F) in the summer months.

The area of the southern island of Novaya Zemlya experiences from eight to ten cyclones per month during the winter, with the main direction of the cyclone trajectories from the west and south-west to north-east. The "midnight sun" is above the horizon from 10 May to 3 August (86 days), and the period of continuous night is slightly shorter at 66 days. The polar night runs from 19 November to 23 January.

Mezhdusharsky Island is nearby the settlement.

== Economy ==
Belushya Guba has schools, apartment buildings, three hotels, a cashpoint ATM, a television station, a 200-bed Naval Hospital, a polyclinic, military officers' center with a base sailor's club, 25-meter pool, recreational center, and an Orthodox church.

== Transportation ==
There are two regular flights weekly from Arkhangelsk to Rogachevo Airport, located 9 kilometres (5.6 mi) north-east of the settlement (in the time-tables, Rogachyovo is designated as Amderma-2, though the settlement of Amderma is not even located on Novaya Zemlya). There is no regular passenger navigation.
