= Monchegorsk Air Base =

Airbase in Murmansk Oblast, Russia

Monchegorsk
- Мончегорск
- Monchegorsk, Murmansk Oblast in Russia
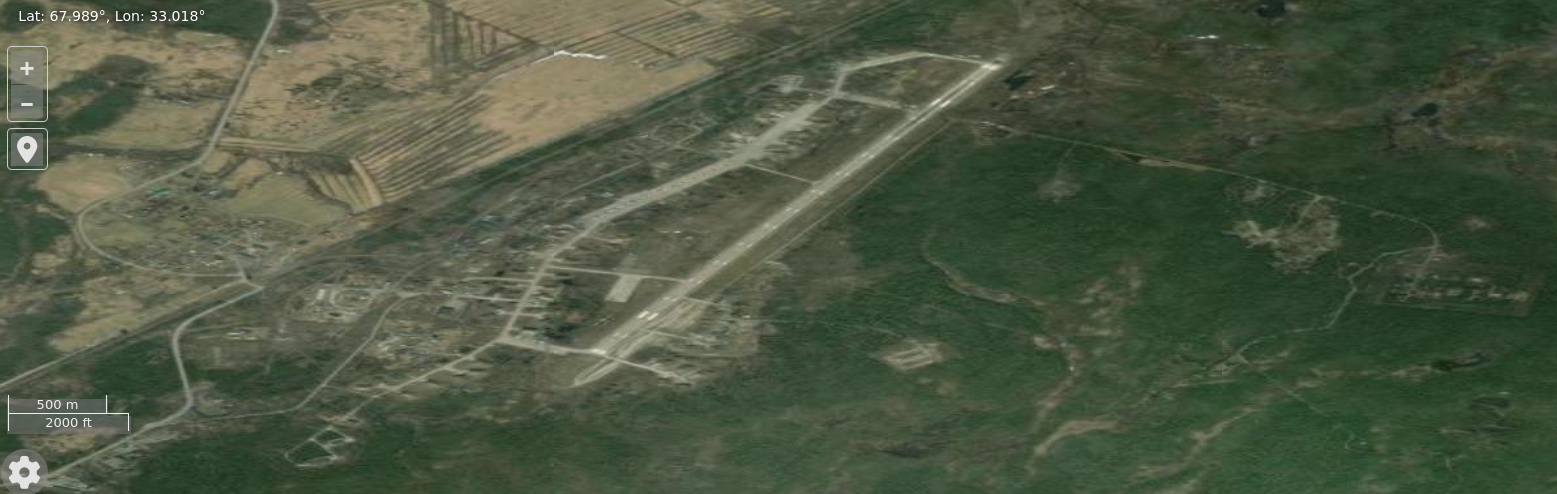
- Satellite imagery of Monchegorsk air base

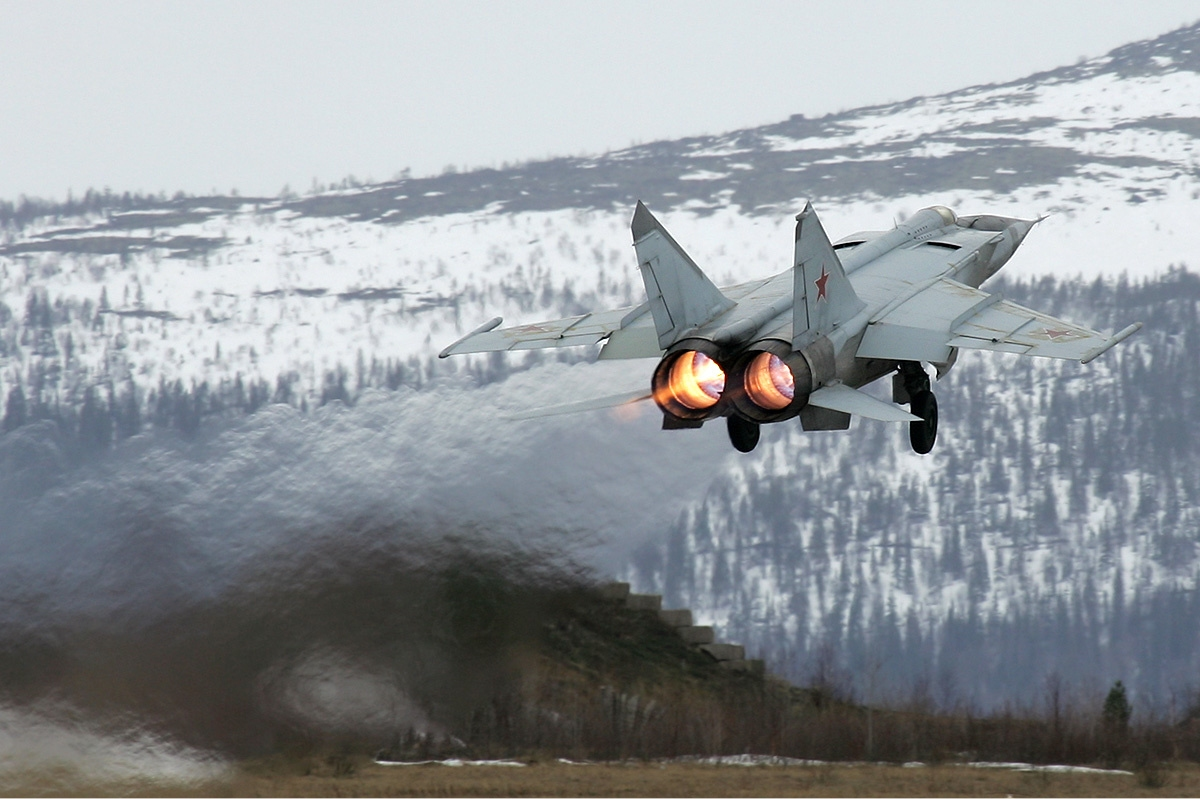

Site information
- Type: Air Base
- Owner: Ministry of Defence
- Operator: Russian Aerospace Forces; Russian Navy - Russian Naval Aviation
- Controlled by: 6th Air and Air Defence Forces Army; 45th Air and Air Defence Forces Army

Location
- Shown within Murmansk Oblast Monchegorsk (Russia)
- Coordinates: 67°59′12″N 33°01′06″E

Site history
- Built: 1957
- In use: 1957 - present

Airfield information
- Elevation: 167 metres (548 ft) AMSL
Runways
| Direction | Length and surface |
|---|---|
| 01/19 | 2,400 metres (7,874 ft) Concrete |

Monchegorsk Air Base is a military air base in Murmansk Oblast, Russia located 13 km northeast of Monchegorsk and 11 miles southwest of Olenya (air base). Work on the air base began in the early 1950s, and by 1957 it was identified on American Lockheed U-2 overflights with a modern 6600 ft (2000 m) runway, extensive infrastructure, and a MiG regiment.

During the Cold War it hosted the 174th Guards Fighter Aviation Regiment (174 Gv IAP) flying the Yak-28P during the 1960s and 1970s, then superseded by the Mikoyan MiG-31 (ASCC "Foxhound") from 1983. The regiment was part of the 21st Air Defence Corps of the 10th Independent Air Defence Army of the Air Defence Forces (PVO). The regiment used aircraft MiG-25PDS (ASCC designation: 'Foxbat-E'), during the 1980s and MiG-31 (ASCC designation: 'Foxhound-A' ) during the 1990s.

A MiG-21R squadron at the base in the 1970s which was upgraded to the Su-17M3 in the early 1980s. It was also home to MiG-25PDS aircraft in the 1980s. In the early 1980s interceptors were deployed to Monchegorsk. The base also hosted a reconnaissance regiment, the 98 ORAP (98th Separate Reconnaissance Aviation Regiment) flying MiG-25RB, Sukhoi Su-17 (designation NATO: 'Fitter-C' ), Sukhoi Su-24MR (NATO designation: 'Fencer-E' ), and MiG-31 aircraft.

The base is home to the 98th Guards Composite Aviation Regiment (Military Unit Number 75385) which uses the Sukhoi Su-24M/MR (NATO: Fencer), Mikoyan MiG-31BM (NATO: Foxhound) & Mil Mi-8MTV (NATO: Hip) The regiment may now be under Russian Navy command.

== Runway ==
Monchegorsk has a runway of concrete in the direction 01/19 of 2,400x40 m. (7.873x131 feet).

== Military operations ==
May 20, 1966 in Monchegorsk, the 67 separate air squadron composed of two early warning aircraft Tupolev Tu-126 (NATO reporting name: 'Moss' ) equipped the radar system "Liana". The same year, on November 10 the unit was moved to the city of Šiauliai, in Lithuania.

The 174th Guards Fighter Aviation Regiment was dissolved on September 1, 2001. After the dissolution, the MiG-31s became part of the 458th Fighter Aviation Regiment, stationed in the Kotlas air base, in the Arkhangelsk Oblast.

It is currently stationed at the 7000 air group aerodrome serving aircraft Su-24MR (NATO designation: 'Fencer-E' ), Su-24M (NATO designation: 'Fencer-D') and Mi-8 helicopters (NATO designation: Hip).

== See also ==
- List of military airbases in Russia
