= Kilpyavr (rural locality) =

Kilpyavr Килпъявр
- Inhabited locality
- Interactive map of Kilpyavr
- Location of Kilpyavr Kilpyavr (Murmansk Oblast)
- Coordinates: 69°05′30″N 32°25′36″E
- Country: Russia
- Federal subject: Murmansk Oblast
- Administrative district: Kolsky District
- Territorial okrugSelsoviet: Mezhdurechensky Territorial Okrug

Population (2010 Census)
  - Total: 884
  - Estimate (2021): 178 (−79.9%)

Municipal status
  - Municipal district: Kolsky Municipal District
  - Rural settlement: Mezhdurechye Rural Settlement
- Time zone: UTC+3 (MSK)
- Postal code: 184370
- Dialing code: +7 81553
- OKTMO ID: 47605402116

Kilpyavr (Russian: Килпъявр) is a rural locality (an inhabited locality) in Kolsky District of Murmansk Oblast, Russia, located beyond the Arctic Circle at a height of 114 meters (374 ft) above sea level. Population: 884 (2010 Census).
