= Monchegorsk =

Town in Murmansk Oblast, Russia

Monchegorsk Мончегорск
- Town
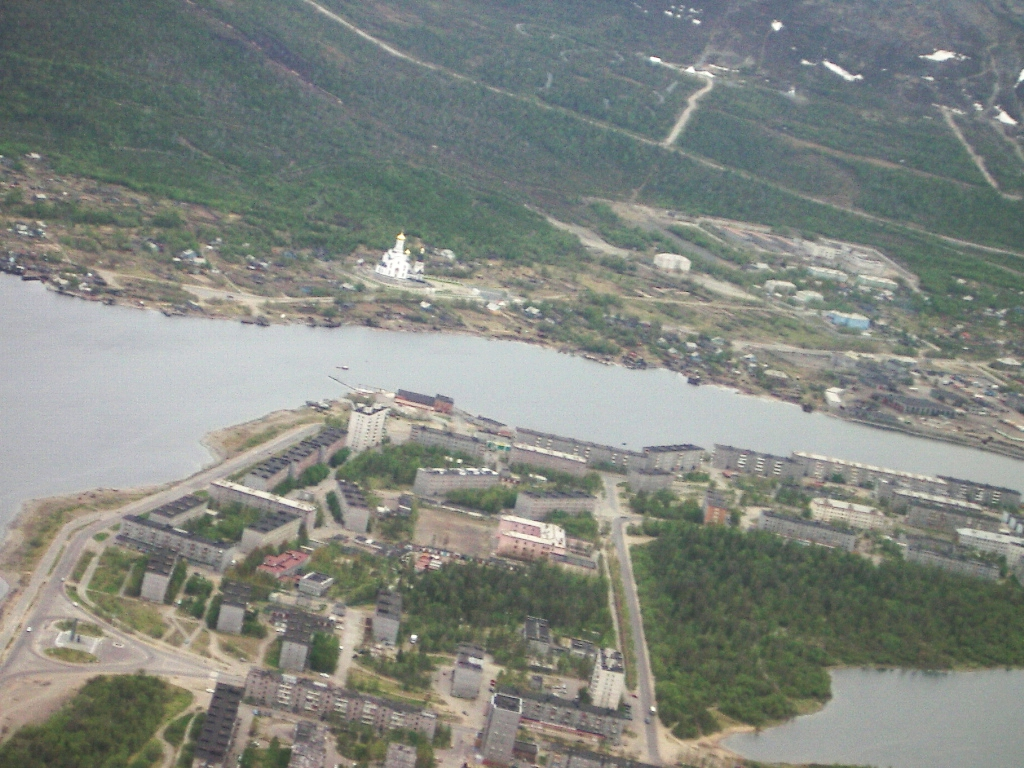
- Aerial view of Monchegorsk

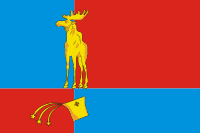
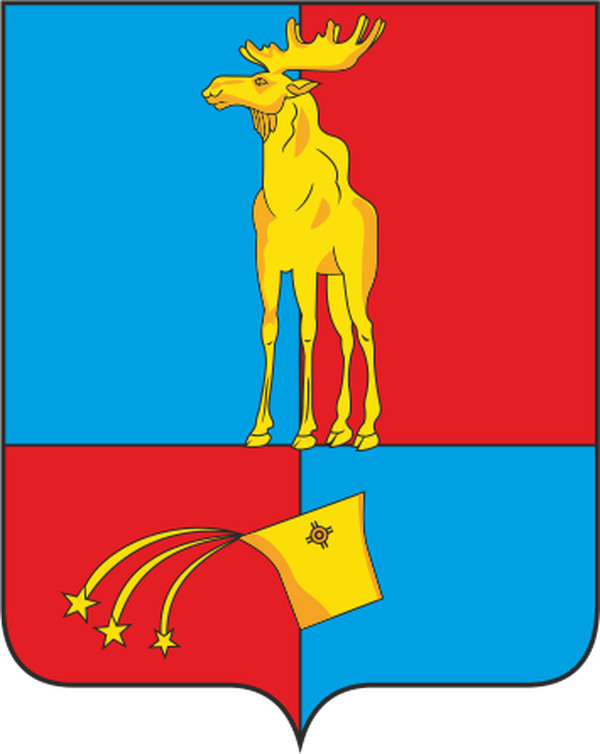
- Flag Coat of arms
- Interactive map of Monchegorsk
- Location of Monchegorsk Monchegorsk (Murmansk Oblast)
- Coordinates: 67°56′N 32°55′E
- Country: Russia
- Federal subject: Murmansk Oblast
- Founded: 1930s
- Town status since: September 20, 1937

Government
  - Mayor: Dmitry Staroverov
- Elevation: 130 m (430 ft)

Population (2010 Census)
  - Total: 45,361
  - Estimate (2025): 38,810 (−14.4%)
  - Rank: 351st in 2010

Administrative status
  - Subordinated to: Monchegorsk Town with Jurisdictional Territory
  - Capital of: Monchegorsk Town with Jurisdictional Territory

Municipal status
  - Urban okrug: Monchegorsk Urban Okrug
  - Capital of: Monchegorsk Urban Okrug
- Time zone: UTC+3 (MSK)
- Postal code: 184505
- Dialing code: +7 815 36
- OKTMO ID: 47715000001
- Website: www.monchegorsk-adm.ru

Monchegorsk (Russian: Мончего́рск) is a town in Murmansk Oblast, Russia, located on the Kola Peninsula, 145 kilometers (90 mi) south of Murmansk, the administrative center of the oblast. Population: 45,361 (2010 census); 52,242 (2002 Census); 68,652 (1989 Census).

== Name ==
The name of the town derives from Akkala Sámi word monče 'beautiful'. The name originally was intended for nearby Montshatuntur (Arctic Hill).

== History ==
It was established in the 1930s as the inhabited locality of Moncha-Guba (Монча-Губа), which served copper and nickel mining in the Monchetundra Massif. It was granted work settlement status and renamed Monchegorsk by the Resolution of the Presidium of All-Russian Central Executive Committee (VTsIK) on November 25, 1935. At the same time, it was transferred from Kolsky District to Kirovsky District. By 1937, the copper-nickel mining volume increased significantly, and, consequently, the area population grew as well. On February 19, 1937, the Presidium of the Murmansk Okrug Executive Committee petitioned to create new Monchegorsky District by separating the town and its surrounding area from Kirovsky District and to grant Monchegorsk town status. As a result, town status was granted to Monchegorsk by the VTsIK Resolution of September 20, 1937, although no new district was formed. On October 10, 1937, Monchegorsk town council was subordinated directly to the Murmansk Okrug Executive Committee.

On December 21, 1937, the Presidium of the Murmansk Okrug Executive Committee again petitioned to create a new district with the administrative center in Monchegorsk. In a letter to the Leningrad Oblast Executive Committee and the VTsIK, the Presidium noted that Kirovsky District has two developed but unrelated industrial centers—Kirovsk and Monchegorsk—with the latter having a larger population and being located 111 kilometers (69 mi) away from the former. The petition was again unsuccessful—when on February 10, 1938 the VTsIK adopted a new Resolution changing the administrative-territorial structure of Leningrad Oblast (of which Murmansk Okrug was a part), Monchegorsk remained a part of Kirovsky District.

Monchegorsky District was eventually formed on December 27, 1938. It existed until December 9, 1949, when by the Decree of the Presidium of the Supreme Soviet of the Soviet Union Monchegorsk was elevated in status to that of a town under oblast jurisdiction, with the former district's territory passing into its subordination.

By the August 10, 1981 Presidium of the Supreme Soviet of the Russian SFSR Decree, the town of Olenegorsk was elevated in status to that of a town under oblast jurisdiction and subsequently several inhabited localities previously subordinated to Monchegorsk were transferred to Olenegorsk by the August 26, 1981 Decision of the Murmansk Oblast Executive Committee.

== Administrative and municipal status ==
Within the framework of administrative divisions, it is, together with three rural localities, incorporated as Monchegorsk Town with Jurisdictional Territory—an administrative unit with the status equal to that of the districts. As a municipal division, Monchegorsk Town with Jurisdictional Territory is incorporated as Monchegorsk Urban Okrug.

== Economy ==
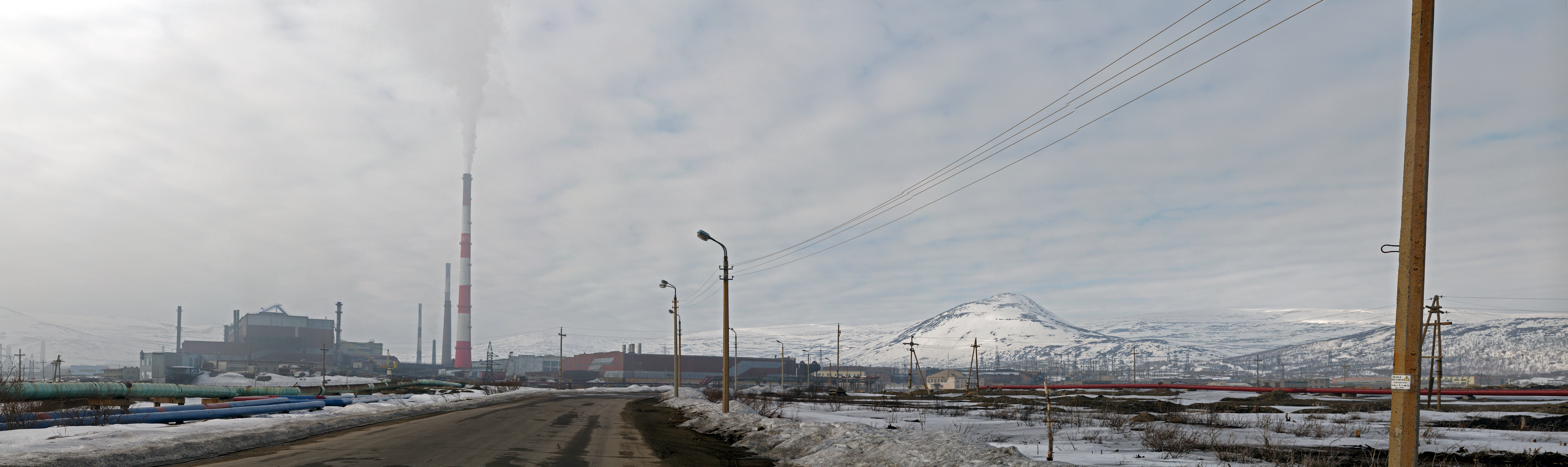
Nickel and copper producing factories in Monchegorsk

Monchegorsk is a center of nickel cobalt and copper production (a Norilsk Nickel plant is located here). It also hosts the Monchegorsk air base of the Russian Air Force. The area surrounding the town is severely polluted. The Barents Euro-Arctic Council has listed Monchegorsk among the Barents Euro-Arctic region's environmental hotspots, though it noted that the problem was gradually being solved. Since 1998, SO_{2} emissions in the Monchegorsk area have dropped by almost 60%, from 88.3 thousand tonnes to 37.3 thousand tonnes in 2016, according to Norilsk Nickel. The company launched a $20 billion environmental programme aimed at reducing emissions, modernising and closing down polluting facilities, as well as implement energy saving and lower energy consuming measures.

== Demographics ==
Historical population
| Year | Pop. | ±% |
|---|---|---|
| 1939 | 28,450 | — |
| 1959 | 45,523 | +60.0% |
| 1970 | 45,980 | +1.0% |
| 1979 | 51,401 | +11.8% |
| 1989 | 68,652 | +33.6% |
| 2002 | 52,242 | −23.9% |
| 2010 | 45,361 | −13.2% |
| 2021 | 39,962 | −11.9% |
Population size may be affected by changes in administrative divisions. Source: Censuses

Ethnic composition (2010):

- Russians – 91.1%
- Ukrainians – 3.0%
- Belarusians – 1.5%
- Azerbaijanis – 1.1%
- Tatars – 0.6%
- Others – 2.8%

== Sports ==
The bandy team Kolskaya GMK has played in the highest division of Russian Bandy League, last in 2010–2011. Their home arena has a capacity of 5000. Since 2009 there is also a female team.

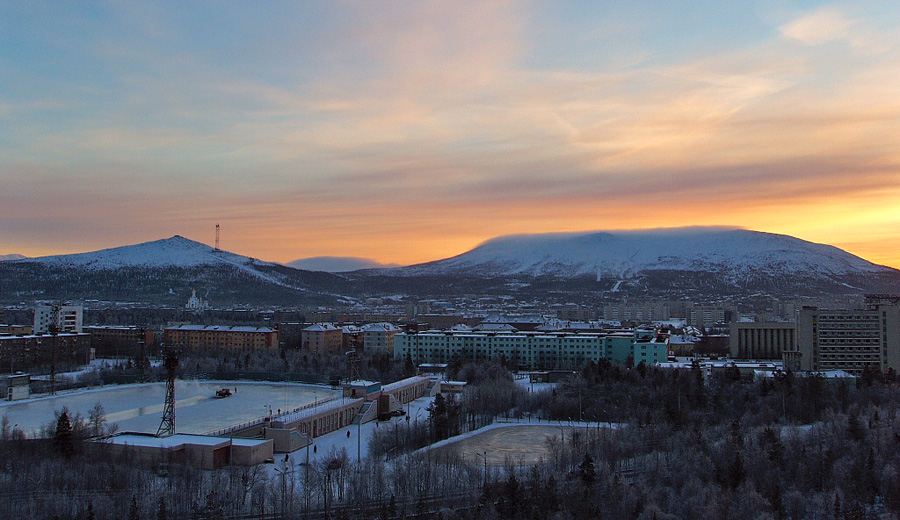
The bandy club's stadium

== Notable people ==
- Alexander Kaletski, Russian-American artist
