= Afrikanda (rural locality) =

Afrikanda Африканда
- Inhabited locality
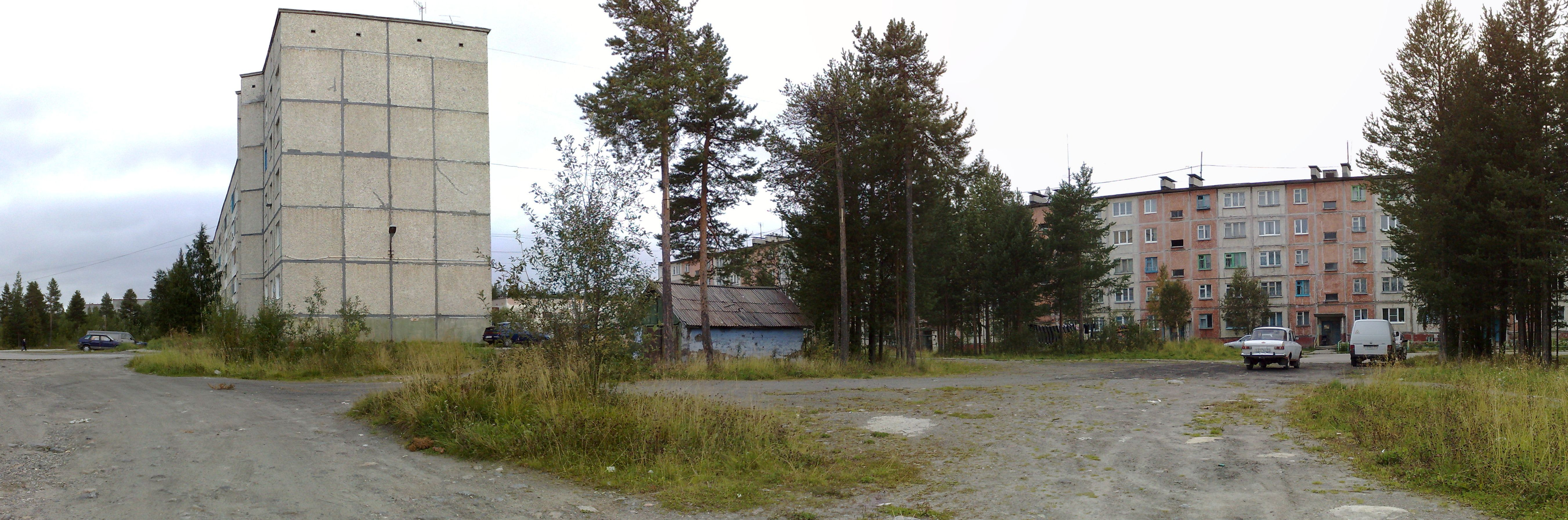
- Residential apartment blocks in Afrikanda
- Interactive map of Afrikanda
- Location of Afrikanda Afrikanda (Murmansk Oblast)
- Coordinates: 67°26′27″N 32°47′29″E
- Country: Russia
- Federal subject: Murmansk Oblast
- Founded: 1925
- Elevation: 138 m (453 ft)

Population (2010 Census)
  - Total: 1,644
  - Estimate (2021): 1,118 (−32%)

Administrative status
  - Subordinated to: Polyarnye Zori Town with Jurisdictional Territory

Municipal status
  - Urban okrug: Polyarnye Zori Urban Okrug
- Time zone: UTC+3 (MSK)
- Postal code: 184220
- Dialing code: +7 81532
- OKTMO ID: 47719000111

Afrikanda (Russian: Африка́нда) is a rural locality (an inhabited locality) in administrative jurisdiction of Polyarnye Zori Town with Jurisdictional Territory in Murmansk Oblast, Russia, located beyond the Arctic Circle on the Kola Peninsula at a height of 140 meters (460 ft) above sea level. Population: 1,644 (2010 Census).

== History ==
The name of the station originated with the conversation of the railway engineers that worked on the nearby rail line. On an unusually hot day, they joked that the locality was "as hot as Africa", and half-jokingly called the future station "Afrikanda"—a name which has stuck.

Afrikanda used to be classified as an urban-type settlement but was demoted in status to that of a rural locality on January 1, 2005.

== Transportation ==
Afrikanda is served by a minor railway station of the same name on the Kirov Railway, between Polyarnye Zori and Apatity.

== Military ==
An air base of the same name is located just north of Afrikanda.
