= Rogachevo (air base) =

Military airport in Novaya Zemlya, Russia

Rogachevo Amderma-2
- Rogachevo, Novaya Zemlya, Arkhangelsk Oblast in Russia
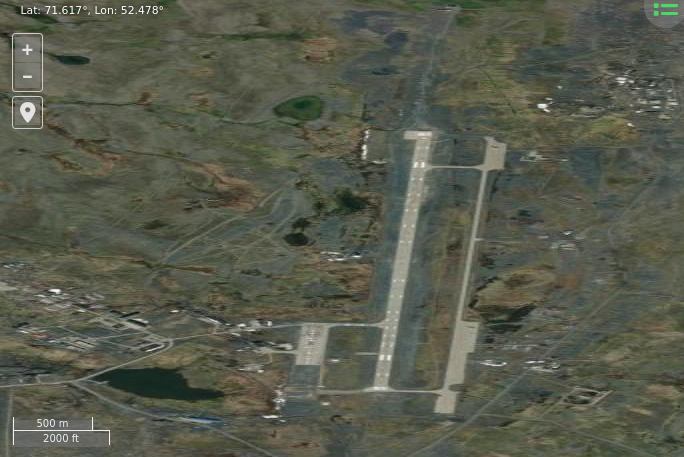
- Satellite imagery of Rogachevo air base

Site information
- Type: Air Base
- Owner: Ministry of Defence
- Operator: Russian Air Force

Location
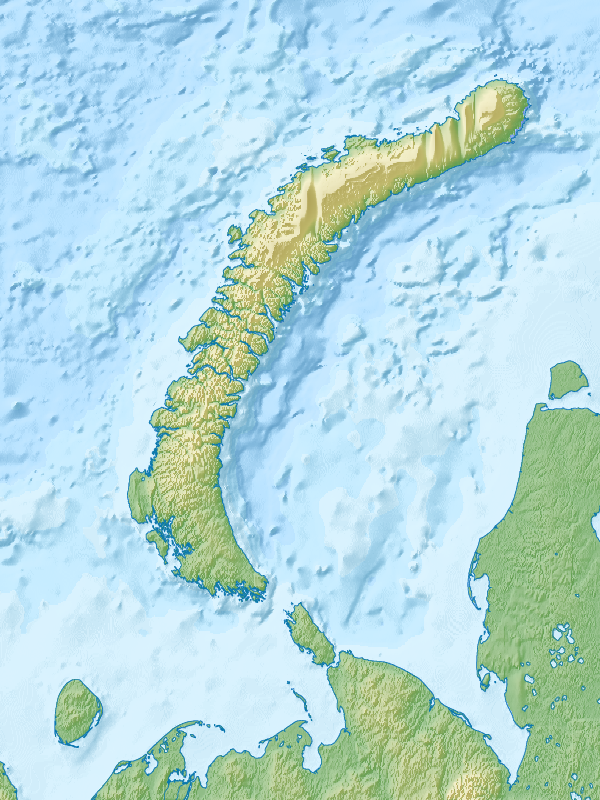
- Shown within Novaya Zemlya Rogachevo (Russia)
- Coordinates: 71°37′0″N 52°28′42″E

Site history
- Built: 1972
- In use: 1972 - present

Airfield information
- Identifiers: ICAO: ULDR
- Elevation: 83 metres (272 ft) AMSL
Runways
Direction	Length and surface
16/34	2,500 metres (8,202 ft) Concrete

Rogachevo (recorded in various sources as Belushya, Rogachvo, or Rogatschovo) is a military air base on Novaya Zemlya, Russia located near the settlement of Rogachevo, 9 km northeast of Belushya Guba. It was originally used as a staging base for intercontinental Long Range Aviation bomber flights (as a so-called 'bounce' airdrome). The base developed an interceptor role during the 1960s, partly to deter Lockheed SR-71 Blackbird operations in the Arctic region.

Rogachevo's primary operating unit is the 641 Gv IAP (641st Guards Interceptor Aviation Regiment). It used Yakovlev Yak-28P (NATO: Firebar) aircraft, then received the Sukhoi Su-27 (NATO: Flanker) in 1985. It is possible that in 1993 the unit may have dispersed to Afrikanda. During the 1970s Tupolev Tu-28 (NATO: Fiddler) aircraft deployed frequently to Rogachevo from southern locales. Around 1990 Mikoyan MiG-31 (NATO: Foxhound) aircraft were deployed on occasion. Rogachevo was largely tied to its rear air station, Naryan-Mar Airport. In 2017, Russia finished new construction on the air base focused on updating technology and adding more social infrastructure.

As of 2022 helicopters from the air base bring personnel to the Pan'kovo test range, located 170 km to the north also on Yuzhny Island.

== History ==
The name “Amderma-2” was assigned to the aerodrome during the Soviet period in order to observe the secrecy regime (in fact, the distance between Rogachevo and the village of Amderma is about 400 km).

From 1972 and at the aerodrome was based 641st Guards Fighter Aviation Regiment. From 1964 to 1988 and the regiment was armed with interceptor fighters Yak-28P, from 1987 and the rearmament of the new fighters began Su-27. In 1993, the regiment was relocated to the airfield Afrikanda, where it was combined with the 431st IAP. On their base was September 1, 1993, and the 470th Guards Vilna Order of Kutuzov Fighter Aviation Regiment was formed.

== Destinations ==
Until 2012, twice a week, the airline “Nordavia” operated a passenger flight Arkhangelsk (Talagi) - Amderma-2 - Arkhangelsk (Talagi) by plane An-24.

From November 5, 2015, Aviastar started operating passenger and cargo flights along the route Arkhangelsk (Talagi) - Amderma-2 - Arkhangelsk (Talagi) on airplanes An-24 and An-26.

== See also ==
- List of military airbases in Russia
