= Afrikanda (air base) =

Military airfield in Murmansk, Russia

Afrikanda
- Afrikanda, Murmansk Oblast in Russia
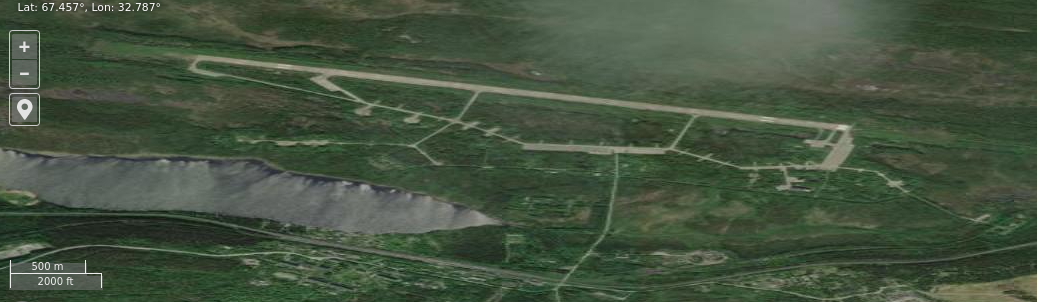
- Satellite imagery of the former Afrikanda air base

Site information
- Type: Air Base
- Owner: Ministry of Defence
- Operator: Russian Air Force

Location
- Shown within Murmansk Oblast Afrikanda (Russia)
- Coordinates: 67°27′24″N 32°47′12″E

Site history
- In use: Unknown - 2000

Airfield information
- Identifiers: ICAO: XLMF
- Elevation: 154 metres (505 ft) AMSL
Runways
Direction	Length and surface
10/28	Concrete

Afrikanda is a former military air base in Murmansk Oblast, Russia. It is located just north of the village of the same name. It was built for fighter operations with 30 revetments, and has largely served in the interceptor aircraft role.

Western intelligence services reported jet fighters operating from Afrikanda as early as 1953. From 1953, the 431st Fighter Aviation Regiment (431 IAP) was stationed at the base, which became the 431 Regiment PVO in 1960. From 1960 the regiment was part of the 21st Air Defence Corps. It served through the whole Cold War; in 1978 a Sukhoi Su-15 was launched from Afrikanda to intercept Korean Air Flight 902, a Boeing 707 which was later forcefully landed; and in 1990, according to Conventional Forces in Europe data exchanges, it had 39 Sukhoi Su-15TM interceptor aircraft. In September 1993 it was merged with the 641 Guards IAP and became the 470th Guards Fighter Aviation Regiment. The regiment also operated a number of Su-27 aircraft.

The 470 Guards IAP disbanded on 30 November 2000 and the base was closed.

== History ==
=== During World War II ===
On June 26, 1941, the first known air victory was won over the airfield 147th Fighter Aviation Regiment in World War II (the regiment was based at Murmashi airfield): senior lieutenant L.I. Ivanov, piloting a Polikarpov I-15bis, shot down a German bomber in an air battle near the Afrikanod airfield, Heinkel He 111.

In the future, the airfield was used by combat aircraft Karelian Front. From June 1 to July 1, 1942, the 835th Fighter Aviation Regiment was based at the airfield on Hawker Hurricane fighters. Also at the aerodrome from 1941 to November 10, 1943, 609th Fighter Aviation Regiment was based on the Hurricane and LaGG-3 fighter planes.

In 1943, the 137th short-range aviation regiment was based at the airfield from 258th mixed aviation division flying Douglas A-20 Boston III bombers, for exemplary performance of command assignments renamed 114th Guards Middle Bomb Aviation Regiment.

In March 1944, units of the operational group 8th long-range air corps were based on the airfield: operational group 36th long-range aviation division actions and 455th long-range air regiment 48th long-range aviation division flying the Ilyushin Il-4 long-range bomber.

From April to June 1944, the 668th Assault Aviation Regiment was based at Afrikanda, flying Ilyushin Il-2 Shturmovik ground-attack aircraft.

=== Post-war period ===
From August 1945 to July 1946, the 668th cap continued to be based on IL-2 aircraft at the aerodrome.

In the period from October 1953 to September 1993, 431st Fighter Aviation Regiment was based on the airfield, Armaments MiG-15, MiG-17, MiG-19 and Su-15TM.

From 1954 to 1960, a bomber aviation regiment (military unit No. 32812), one of the regiments 184th bomber aviation division was also based at this airfield 22nd Air Army. The regiment was armed with a front-line jet bomber IL-28.

In 1993 from the airfield Rogachevo was translated 641st Guards Vilna Order Kutuzov Fighter Aviation Regiment.

Both regiments were merged into one, which in September 1993 received the name of the 470th Guards Vilna Order of Kutuzov Fighter Aviation Regiment. In service with the 470th Guards. Iap consisted fighter Su-27.

September 1, 2001 and the 470th Guards Fighter Aviation Regiment was disbanded.

== See also ==
- List of military airbases in Russia
