= Kilpyavr (air base) =

Airport in Murmansk Oblast, Russia

Kilpyavr Kilp Yavr
- Kilpyavr, Murmansk Oblast in Russia
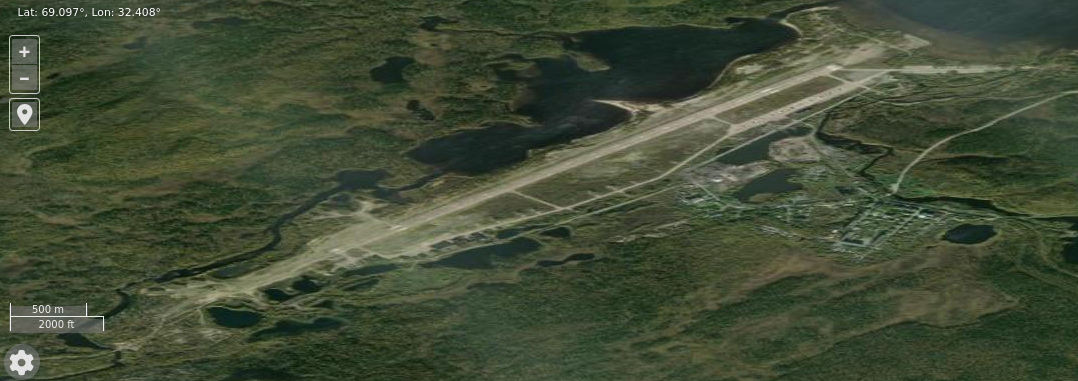
- Satellite imagery of the former Kilpyavr airbase

Site information
- Type: Air Base
- Owner: Ministry of Defence
- Operator: Russian Air Force

Location
- Shown within Murmansk Oblast Kilpyavr (Russia)
- Coordinates: 69°5′48″N 32°24′30″E

Site history
- Built: 1952
- In use: 1952 - 2009

Airfield information
- Elevation: 93 metres (305 ft) AMSL
Runways
Direction	Length and surface
03/21	2,500 metres (8,202 ft) Concrete

Kilpyavr (Russian: Килпъявр or Килп-Явр, Finnish: Kilpijärvi. Also appearing in many different forms as Kilpajärvi, Kilp-Yavr, Kil'p-Yar, Kilp-Yar, Kilpyarvi) is a former military air base in Murmansk Oblast, Russia located 30 km northwest of Murmansk. It was a small interceptor base operated by the 941st Fighter Aviation Regiment (941 IAP).

Kilpyavr's interceptor regiment initially operated the Sukhoi Su-9 (NATO: Fishpot) in the 1960s and 1970s. This aircraft was replaced in 1978 with the Mikoyan-Gurevich MiG-23M (NATO: Flogger-B). Kilpyavr also operated the Mikoyan-Gurevich MiG-19 (NATO: Farmer), and upgraded to Sukhoi Su-27 (NATO: Flanker) aircraft in 1985.

== See also ==
- List of military airbases in Russia
