= 149th Mixed Aviation Division =

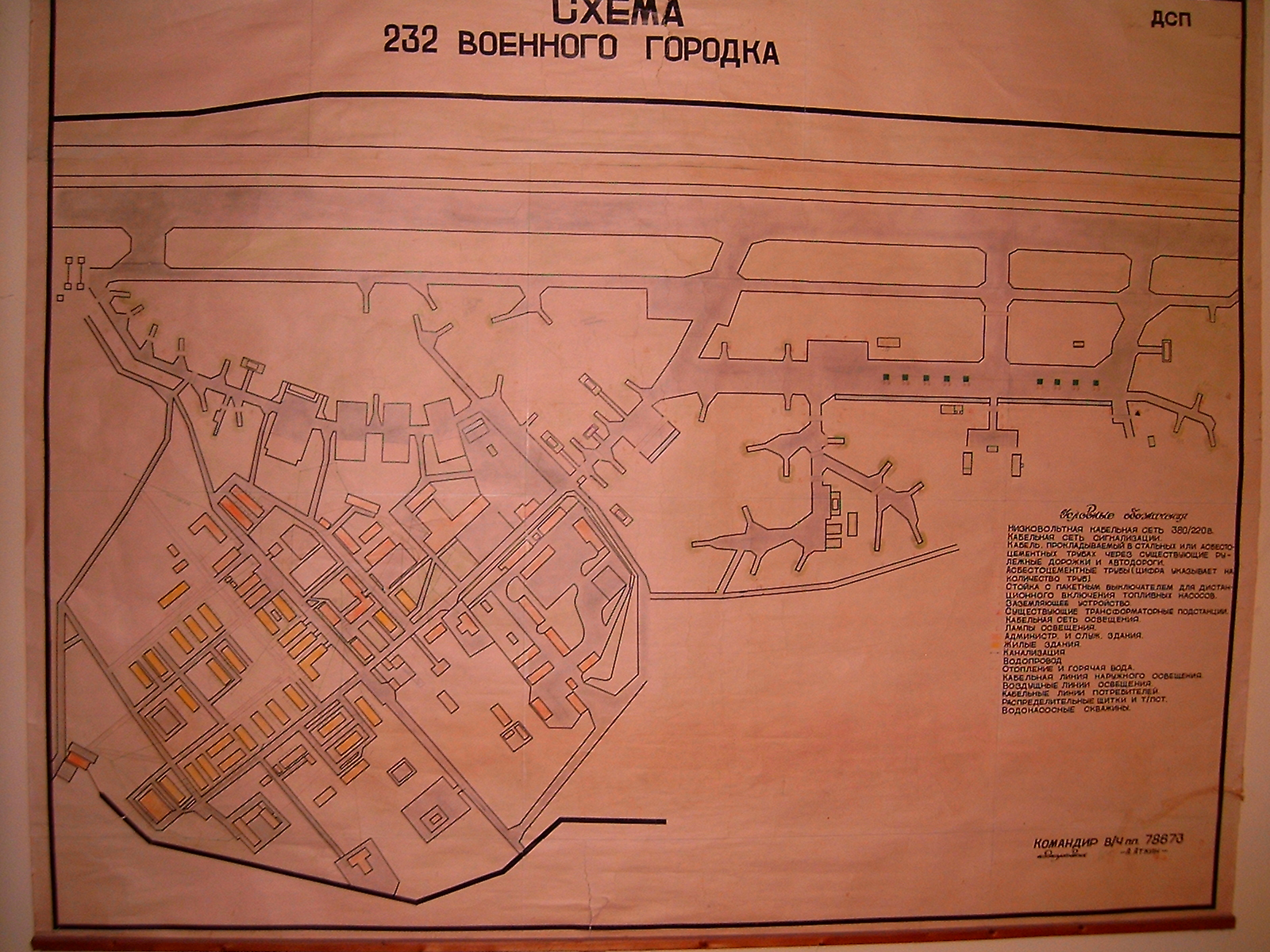
- Soviet chart of Szprotawa airfield
- Active: 1942–2000s
- Country: Soviet Union; Russia
- Branch: Soviet Air Forces (PVO until 1952); Russian Air Force
- Role: Interceptor, Fighter (before 1960); Strike (from 1960)
- Size: 112 aircraft (2000)
- HQ: Khabarovsk (1942–1952); Sanshilipu (1952-1955); Szprotawa (1955–1992); Smuravyevo (1992–2000s)
- Engagements: Soviet–Japanese War

The 149th Mixed Aviation Division (149 sad) (Russian: 149-я смешанная авиационная дивизия (149 сад); Military Unit Number 63352 after 1992) was an aviation division of the Russian Air Force.

The division began its history as the 149th Fighter Aviation Division PVO of the Soviet National Air Defense Forces (PVO) during World War II, stationed in the Far East. It participated in the Soviet invasion of Manchuria and was transferred to the Soviet Air Forces during the Cold War in 1952. The division was sent to serve in China for air defense before being transferred to Poland in 1955, where it became part of the 37th (later the 4th) Air Army. Headquartered at Szprotawa, the division converted to attack aircraft in 1960, becoming the 149th Fighter-Bomber Aviation Division. The division was redesignated as the 149th Bomber Aviation Division when its units received the Sukhoi Su-24 in 1982 and was withdrawn from Poland after the end of the Cold War. Under the Russian Air Force, the division was renamed the 149th Mixed Aviation Division and controlled the fixed-wing bomber and reconnaissance aircraft regiments of the 76th Air Army and then the 6th Air and Air Defence Forces Army in the Leningrad Military District before its disbandment in the 2000s.

== History ==
=== World War II ===
The division was formed at Khabarovsk during World War II as the 149th Fighter Aviation Division PVO (IAD) on 7 August 1942, part of the Far Eastern Air Defense Zone of the Far Eastern Front (DVF). Major Yefim Chervyakov, promoted to lieutenant colonel on 16 October of that year, was appointed division commander. The division included three fighter aviation regiments (IAP), the 3rd, the 18th at Khabarovsk, and the 60th at Dzyomgi, which had all previously been under Air Force (VVS) control. The 18th IAP was equipped with the modern LaGG-3, but the 3rd and 60th IAPs still retained the obsolete Polikarpov I-16; Soviet aviation units in the Far East were low-priority for receiving new aircraft since they were not in an active combat zone. The regiments of the 149th IAD PVO were the only aviation units within the air defense zone until 1945.

The 3rd IAP was transferred back to the 11th Air Army of the VVS DVF on 10 April 1943 but returned to the 149th IAD on 9 June; it was shifted back to the 11th Air Army on 26 October, leaving the division with only the 18th and 60th IAPs. Chervyakov was relieved of command in mid-October 1943 due to a high accident rate in the division. He was replaced by Lieutenant Colonel Mikhail Kozlov. In early 1945, the 18th and 60th IAPs converted to the Yakovlev Yak-9. The new 3rd IAP, renamed from the 534th IAP when the units swapped designations, joined the 149th from the 10th Air Army of the VVS DVF on 5 May 1945 and converted to the Yak-9 before the Soviet invasion of Manchuria. During the same month, the 400th IAP PVO joined the division after arriving from Europe by rail without aircraft and received the Lavochkin La-7 before the invasion began.

The division became part of the Amur Air Defense Army when the zone was split in 1945 and during the Soviet invasion of Manchuria, it provided air cover for Khabarovsk, Komsomolsk-on-Amur, and Nikolayevsk as well as rear communications, concentration areas, and troops of the 2nd Far Eastern Front. Elements of the division participated in the Sungari Offensive and the Soviet invasion of South Sakhalin, in which they did not face Japanese air resistance. The lack of Japanese air activity and bad weather resulted in the units of the division flying very few combat missions during the war; for example, four out of 22 sorties flown by the 18th IAP were escort for the transport aircraft of Soviet theatre commander Marshal Aleksandr Vasilevsky. After the end of the war, Kozlov commanded the division until his death in an accident near the Nikolayevka airfield on 7 June 1946.

=== Cold War ===
The 3rd IAP was re-equipped with the Yak-3 in January 1946 and entered the jet age when it received the MiG-15 in September 1951. The 400th IAD was disbanded in 1946. The 582nd IAP was transferred to the division from the 249th IAD in February 1949, replacing the 60th IAP which was shifted to the Air Force. The division was shifted from the PVO to the Air Force on 29 January 1952, coming under the 54th Air Army of the Far Eastern Military District. The division, headquartered at Sanshilipu provided air defense for the Liaodong Peninsula in the People's Republic of China between 11 October 1952 and 18 April 1955, and trained People's Liberation Army Air Force (PLAAF) pilots on jet aircraft. The 582nd was based at Jinzhou. The 149th IAD was railed to Poland between 18 April and 23 May 1955, handing its aircraft over to the PLAAF. In Poland, the division became part of the 37th Air Army of the Northern Group of Forces and was headquartered at Szprotawa. The 582nd was based at the Piła airfield, but in June transferred to the 239th IAD of the 37th Air Army. The 582nd was replaced in the 149th IAD by the 42nd Guards IAP of the 239th. The 3rd IAP received the MiG-17 in August.

The division was redesignated as the 149th Fighter-Bomber Aviation Division (IBAD) on 1 September 1960. Its regiments accordingly became fighter-bomber aviation regiments (IBAP) and the 3rd and 18th received the Su-7B fighter-bomber. The 3rd and 18th IBAP converted to the Mikoyan MiG-27 in 1976, and the fighter-bomber regiments of the division were redesignated aviation regiments of fighter-bombers (APIB) later that year, with the division redesignated as the 149th ADIB. The 18th APIB was renumbered as the 89th APIB on 15 October 1981. The regiments of the division became receiving the Sukhoi Su-24 strike aircraft in December 1982 (for the 3rd APIB) and in July 1982 the 149th was renamed the 149th Bomber Aviation Division (BAD). Its regiments accordingly became bomber aviation regiments (BAP). According to data released under the Treaty on Conventional Armed Forces in Europe, the regiments of the division had 69 Su-24s between them on 19 November 1990.

=== Russian service ===
After the dissolution of the Soviet Union, the division became part of the Russian Air Force. The division headquarters and the 89th Bomber Aviation Regiment were withdrawn to the Leningrad Military District in spring 1992. The 42nd Guards BAP was disbanded at Voronezh while the 3rd BAP was disbanded at Lebyazhye with its Su-24s mothballed in the Urals. The division became the 149th Mixed Aviation Division (SAD) under the 76th Air Army and headquartered at Smuravyevo, taking over the army's 67th (Siversky-2) and 722nd (Smuravyevo) Bomber Aviation Regiments and its 98th Guards Reconnaissance Aviation Regiment (Monchegorsk). The headquarters of the 89th Bomber Aviation Regiment, withdrawn to Siversky-2, was disbanded and its aircraft handed over to the 67th Bomber Aviation Regiment. As a result of these reorganizations, the 149th controlled the only combat aviation regiments in the air army. The division continued to exist after the February 1998 merger of 76th Air Army into 6th Air and Air Defence Forces Army as part of the latter. According to Treaty on Conventional Armed Forces in Europe data on 1 January 2000, the division had a total of 2,150 personnel in its three regiments with 26 MiG-25RB and 20 Su-24MR in the 98th Guards Reconnaissance Aviation Regiment, 37 Su-24M in the 67th Bomber Aviation Regiment, and 29 Su-24M in the 722nd Bomber Aviation Regiment for a total of 112 aircraft.

The division and its regiments were included in Kommersant's articles on the Russian military structure in 2005.

When Piotr Butowski wrote two articles for Air Forces Monthly in July and August 2007, the 6th Air and Air Defence Forces Army was covered in the August 2007 issue. Both the 67th and 722nd Bomber Aviation Regiments were included in the listing, at Siverskiy-2 and Smuravyevo (Gdov) respectively, but there was no listing of any 149th Mixed Aviation Division. The division was not listed in the 2008 Kommersant article on the structure of the Russian Air Force.

The Smuravyevo airfield was closed circa 2010.
