= Gigant (rural locality) =

Gigant (Russian: Гига́нт; lit. giant) is the name of several rural localities in Russia.

== Modern localities ==
- Gigant, Bryansk Oblast, a settlement in Vorobeynsky Rural Administrative Okrug of Zhiryatinsky District in Bryansk Oblast; 53°11′N 33°26′E
- Gigant, Rostov Oblast, a settlement in Gigantovskoye Rural Settlement of Salsky District in Rostov Oblast
- Gigant, Tula Oblast, a settlement in Borovkovskaya Rural Territory of Yasnogorsky District in Tula Oblast
- Gigant, Vladimir Oblast, a settlement in Kovrovsky District of Vladimir Oblast

== Alternative names ==
- Gigant, alternative name of Kommuna, a settlement in Sinezersky Rural Administrative Okrug of Navlinsky District in Bryansk Oblast; 53°7′N 34°33′E
