= Aviation Division =

Type of formation in the Soviet and Russian Air Forces

An Aviation Division (Russian: авиационная дивизия) was a type of formation of the Military Air Forces of the Red Army during the Second World War, the Soviet Air Forces, Soviet Air Defence Forces (PVO) and Aviation of the Military Naval Fleet, and since 1991 remain major formations within the Military Air Forces of the Russian Federation.

Before the start of the Second World War, the aviation divisions formed parts of the Long Range Aviation (13.5% of aircraft), and Frontal Aviation (Military Air Forces of the Military Districts in peacetime; 40.5% of aircraft) of the Red Army Fronts, and units assigned to the Combined Arms Armies as the Army Aviation (43.7% of aircraft). There was also a Forces Aviation (2.3% of aircraft) flying liaison aircraft as part of the Corps and Armies' independent flights and squadrons.

From 1942 the aviation divisions were combined into the Air Armies of the Red Army ground forces, assigned one to each Front, Air Defence Forces (PVO) Armies (including the 1st Fighter Army of the PVO), Soviet Naval Aviation and Aviation of the Reserve of the Supreme Command.

In organisational terms the aviation divisions were often combined into the aviation corps or an Air Army. In terms of combat assignment the aviation divisions were divided into the bombardment aviation divisions (BAD), assault aviation divisions (ShAD), fighter aviation divisions (IAD), mixed aviation divisions (usually one to a Combined Arms Army; SmAD) and transport aviation divisions (TAD). Postwar, fighter bomber aviation divisions (IBAD or ADIB since 1976) and heavy bomber aviation divisions (TBAD) were formed. In 1956, the assault aviation divisions were converted into other units.

The composition of the aviation divisions during wartime was not uniform or constant. Although many divisions begun the war with 3 – 5 aviation regiments, due to the heavy losses suffered in the initial period of the Summer-Autumn Campaign of 1941 (22 June – 4 December), during Operation Barbarossa, from August this was reduced to two with consequent reduction in aircraft from 150–180 to 40–50. However, commencing with Autumn 1942 the size of the aviation divisions began to increase again, and some had four aviation regiments, or five in the PVO and mixed divisions. However the number of mixed divisions, and expediency of 1942, was gradually reduced and from 1944 the Frontal Aviation divisions adopted a 3–4 regiment structure, with the 3 regiments being the more common occurrence in the bombing divisions with some 100 aircraft while the fighter and assault divisions were issued 124 aircraft. The mission profile was flexible depending on the target, with the aviation division deploying as part of the aviation corps, Air Army or independently, utilising the entire aircraft complement, or by regiments, squadrons, flights and even individual aircraft.

Bonn et al. wrote in 2005 that the Soviet Air Forces included 10 basic air divisions at the start of the war, 37 basic air divisions were formed during it, of which only three survived to the end. Seven mixed air divisions existed at the start of the war, and 44 were generated during it. Thirteen were destroyed and disbanded, and the rest converted into other types of divisions. Not a single mixed air division was active at the end of the war. Only one was raised to Guards status, and that, the 1st Guards Mixed Air Division, was converted to the 16th Guards Fighter Aviation Division after November 1944. Seven bombardment air divisions were active at the beginning of the war, with 66 created during its course. Twenty-seven of the 66 were destroyed, disbanded, or otherwise converted. Eighteen became Guards divisions.

Twenty-two specialist long-range air divisions were created during the war, though all were converted to bomber divisions. Forty-eight ground-attack divisions were formed during the war, of which two were destroyed or disbanded and eighteen which became Guards. Eleven fighter divisions existed at the beginning of the war. A hundred and nine in total were formed, of which eleven were destroyed or disbanded, fifteen converted, and 18 became Guards.

== Soviet aviation divisions during the Second World War ==
The list below includes divisions of the Long Range Air Force.

- 1st Mixed Aviation Division (ru:1-я смешанная авиационная дивизия). Existed 15 August 1940 - 15 February 1942; became Air Forces of the 14th Army.
- 1st Ferry Red Banner Aviation Division GVF (Civilian Air Fleet)
- 1st Aviation Transport Division GVF
- 1st Transport Aviation Division
- 1st Stalingrad Long-Range Aviation Division- became 1st Stalingrad Red Banner Bomber Aviation Division
- 1st Night Heavy Bomber Aviation Division
- 1st School Bomber Aviation Division
- 2nd Mixed Aviation Division
- 2nd Special Purpose Aviation Division
- 3rd Bombardment Aviation Division
- 3rd Long-Range Aviation Division
- 3rd Special Red Banner Communications Aviation Division GVF
- 4th Mixed Aviation Division – became 4th Shock Army aviation 22 February 1942
- 5th Mixed Aviation Division – disbanded 18 February 1942
- 6th Mixed Aviation Division – at outbreak of war in Baltic Special Military District, suffered heavy losses in initial German attack, became 48th Army aviation 11 August 1941; reformed immediately and disbanded 11 February 1942
- 7th Mixed Aviation Division – at outbreak of war in Baltic Special Military District, suffered heavy losses in initial German attack, became 3rd Shock Army aviation 22 February 1942
- 8th Mixed Aviation Division
- 8th Bombardment Aviation Division
- 9th Mixed Aviation Division – Served with the Western Special Military District at the outbreak of war, comprising the 13th, 14th, 124th, 126th, 128th, and 129th Fighter Aviation Regiments. Just days before the attack the 9th Mixed Air Division had received 233 new MiG-3s, but they lost 347 of 409 operational aircraft on the first day of the war with almost all of the MiG-3s destroyed on the ground by bombs.
- 10th Mixed Aviation Division
- 11th Mixed Aviation Division
- 12th Bomber Aviation Division – first formation 22.6.41–23.7.41 formed from 12th Mixed Aviation Division)
- 12th Mginskaya Long-Range Aviation Division, later 12th Mginskaya Red Banner Bomber Aviation Division (2nd form.)(formed from 12th Aviation Division, Long Range (ад ДД) 26.12.44–9.5.45) Later became 12th Military Transport Aviation Division.
- 12th Mixed Aviation Division
- 13th Bomber Aviation Division
- 14th Aviation Division
- 15th Mixed Aviation Division
- 16th Aviation Division – formed August 1940 in Kiev MD from 35th Aviation Brigade, became 21st Army VVS in February 1942
- 17th Aviation Division – formed July 1940 in Kiev Special MD from 56th Fighter Aviation Brigade, disbanded September 1941
- 17th long-range air division
- 18th air division
- 19th air division
- 20th mixed air division
- 21st mixed air division
- 22nd air division
- 23rd mixed air division
- 23rd heavy bomber air division
- 24th long-range air division, later 24th bombardment air division
- 25th bombardment air division
- 26th long-range bombardment air division
- 27th bombardment air division
- 28th mixed air division
- 29th bombardment Amur air division
- 30th long-range bombardment Khinganskaya red banner air division
- 31st mixed air division
- 32nd bombardment red banner air division
- 33rd Bomber Aviation Division – Activated 5.11.40 in Vozdvizhenka, Primorskiy Kray, as the 33rd Aviation Division Long-Range. Under 9th Air Army until 1944. 26.12.44 renamed 33rd Bomber Aviation Division. Disbanded 1951.
- 34th bomber red banner air division
- 35th long-range bombardment air division
- 36th fighter air defence division (PVO)
- 36th Smolensk long-range air division
- 36th bomber Smolensk red banner air division
- 38th bombardment air division
- 38th mixed air division
- 39th bombardment air division
- 40th long-range bombardment air division
- 41st air division
- 42nd long-range bombardment air division
- 43rd bombardment air division
- 43rd mixed air division
- 44th bombardment air division
- 45th mixed air division
- 45th Gomel air division of distant action
- 45th Heavy Bomber Aviation Division – "Gomel"
- 46th Aviation Division – Formed in accordance with an Ukaz of the VVS on 12.08.1940. Part of the Air Forces of the Moscow Military District. June–July 1941 assigned to the Air Forces of the 12th Army (Soviet Union). Reassigned to the Air Forces of the 22nd Army (Soviet Union) 10.07.41, and then Western Front Air Forces in August 1941. Disbanded 1 March 1942.
- 47th mixed air division
- 48th long-range bombardment air division, later 48th Riga long-range air division
- 48th bomber Riga air division
- 49th mixed air division
- 50th long-range bombardment air division
- 50th Crimean long-range air division, later 50th bomber Crimean red banner air division
- 51st long-range bombardment air division
- 52nd long-range bombardment air division
- 53rd long-range bombardment air division (DVF), later 53rd Stalingrad long-range air division, later 53rd bomber Stalingrad air division
- 54th bombardment air division
- 54th Orel long-range air division, later 54th bomber Orel air division
- 55th Composite Aviation Division
- 56th air division
- 56th Breslavlskaya long-range air division fighters
- 57th mixed air division
- 59th bombardment air division
- 60th mixed air division
- 61st mixed air division
- 62nd air division
- 62nd Aviation Division Long-range
- 63rd air division
- 64th air division
- 65th air division
- 66th air division
- 67th bombardment air division
- 68th bombardment air division
- 71st air division
- 72nd bombardment air division
- 73rd mixed air division
- 74th mixed air division
- 75th mixed air division
- 76th mixed air division
- 77th mixed air division
- 78th bombardment air division
- 81st long-range air division
- 83rd bomber air division
- 90th air division
- 91st air division
- 92nd air division
- 96th assault Amur air division
- 101st fighter air defence division (PVO)
- 102nd fighter air defence division (PVO)
- 103rd air division
- 104th fighter air defence division (PVO)
- 105th fighter air defence division (PVO)
- 106th fighter air defence division (PVO)
- 113th bomber Leningrad red banner air division
- 113th long-range air division
- 122nd fighter Pecenga air defence division
- 123rd fighter air defence division (PVO)
- 124th fighter air defence division (PVO)
- 125th fighter air defence division (PVO)
- 126th fighter air defence division (PVO)
- 127th bombardment air division
- 128th mixed Kurile air division
- 129th bombardment Koenigsberg order of Kutuzov air division
- 130th bombardment Insterburg order of Suvorov air division
- 132nd Sevastopol Bomber Aviation Division – formed May 1941, transferred to Baltic Fleet 1989 and renamed 132nd Maritime Assault Aviation Division (132nd Bomber Aviation Division)
- 133rd air division
- 134th long-range bombardment air division
- 135th mixed air division
- 135th bombardment air division
- 136th assault Nizhnednestrovskaya order of Suvorov air division
- 140th air division
- 141st fighter air defence division (PVO)
- 142nd fighter air defence division (PVO)
- 144th fighter air defence division (PVO)
- 146th air division
- 147th fighter air defence division (PVO)
- 148th fighter air defence division (PVO)
- 149th Fighter Aviation Division (PVO) – activated June 1942, later became a bomber aviation division and served with 4th Air Army and 76th Air Army before disbanding in 1998
- 179th bomber air division
- 181st bombardment Chenstokhovskaya order of Kutuzov air division
- 182nd assault Tilzitskaya orders of Suvorov and Kutuzov air division
- 183rd bomber Berlin air division
- 185th bombardment air division
- 188th bomber Riga air division
- 189th assault Nizhnednestrovskaya order of Suvorov air division
- 190th bombardment Polotsk red banner order of Kutuzov air division
- 193rd bombardment Demblinskaya order of Suvorov air division
- 194th bombardment air division
- 196th assault Zhlobinskaya red banner air division
- 197th assault Demblinskaya red banner air division
- 198th assault Warsaw red banner air division
- 199th assault Slonimskaya red banner air division
- 201st bombardment Stalingrad air division
- 202nd bombardment air division
- 202nd bomber Mid-Don red banner order of Suvorov air division in the name of Supreme Soviet of Tatarskaya ASSR
- 203rd mixed air division
- 203rd bombardment Znamenskaya air division
- 204th mixed air division
- 204th bomber air division
- 205th Kirovograd Fighter Aviation Division – Activated 5.42 as the 205th Fighter Aviation Division. Under 7th Fighter Aviation Corps, June 1943 – 10.44; 6th Guards Fighter Aviation Corps, 10.44 – 3.47. On 27.10.44 renamed 22nd Guards Fighter Aviation Division. Disbanded March 1947.
- 206th bombardment air division
- 206th assault Melitopolskaya red banner air division
- 207th mixed air division
- 207th bombardment air division
- 208th mixed air division
- 208th night bomber Kiev red banner air division
- 209th bombardment air division
- 210th bombardment air division (1st form.)
- 210th bombardment air division (2nd form.)
- 211th mixed air division
- 211th short range bomber air division
- 211th night bomber air division
- 211th assault Nevelskaya order of Lenin red banner order of Suvorov air division
- 212th mixed air division
- 212th assault air division
- 213th night bomber Vitebsk red banner orders of Suvorov and Kutuzov air division
- 214th assault Kerch air division
- 215th mixed air division
- 215th bombardment Tannenbergskaya red banner air division
- 216th bombardment air division
- 216th mixed air division
- 216th Fighter Air Division, later became 9th Guards Fighter Air Division.
- 218th Yasskaya red banner Night Bomber Aviation Division – had 588th Night Bomber Aviation Regiment, the "Night Witches" under its command.
- 219th bomber Chenstokhovskaya orders of Suvorov and Kutuzov air division
- 220th bombardment air division
- 221st bomber Bakhmachskaya order of Suvorov air division
- 222nd long-range aviation division, later 222nd long-range bombardment air division
- 223rd bomber air division
- 224th assault Zhmerinskaya red banner air division
- 225th assault Riga air division
- 226th Assault Aviation Division
- 227th assault Berdichevskaya red banner air division
- 228th assault air division
- 229th bombardment Taman red banner air division
- 230th assault Kuban red banner order of Suvorov air division
- 231st assault Roslavl air division
- 232nd assault air division
- 233rd assault Yartsevskaya red banner order of Suvorov air division
- 234th bombardment Mozyrskaya order of Suvorov air division
- 235th bombardment Stalingrad air division
- 236th bombardment Lvov red banner air division
- 237th bombardment air division
- 238th assault air division
- 239th bombardment air division
- 240th bombardment Nevelskaya red banner order of Suvorov air division
- 241st bomber Rechitskaya order of Kutuzovair division
- 242nd night bomber Lyublinskaya red banner order of Suvorov air division
- 243rd assault air division
- 244th bomber Lozovskaya red banner of Bogdan Khmelnitskiy's order air division
- 245th bombardment Port-Arturskaya air division
- 246th bombardment Mukdenskaya air division
- 247th bomber air division
- 248th assault Port-Arturskaya air division
- 249th bombardment red banner air division
- 250th bombardment red banner air division
- 251st assault red banner air division
- 252nd assault red banner air division
- 253rd assault Amur air division
- 254th bombardment Amur air division
- 255th mixed Sakhalin air division
- 256th bombardment Kiev red banner of orders of Suvorov and Bogdan Khmelnitskiy air division
- 257th mixed Svirskaya air division
- 257th bombardment Svirskaya air division
- 258th bombardment Svirskaya aviation division
- 258th mixed Svirskaya air division – became 16th Guards Fighter Aviation Division, which see.
- 259th bombardment Gorodokskaya order of Lenin red banner order of Suvorov air division
- 260th Bomber Aviation Division
- 260th mixed Svirskaya air division
- 260th assault Svirskaya red banner order of Suvorov air division
- 261st mixed air division
- 261st assault Svirskaya order of Suvorov air division
- 262nd night bomber Lozovskaya red banner order of Kutuzov air division
- 263rd bombardment air division
- 263rd bomber air division
- 264th assault Kiev red banner air division
- 265th bombardment Melitopolskaya red banner order of Suvorov air division
- 266th bombardment air division
- 266th assault Poltava air division
- 267th assault air division
- 268th bombardment air division
- 269th bombardment Novgorod red banner air division
- 270th bomber air division
- 271st night bomber Stalingrad-Rechitskaya air division
- 272nd night bomber air division
- 273rd bombardment Gomel order of Suvorov air division
- 274th bombardment air division
- 275th bombardment Puskinskaya red banner air division
- 276th bomber Gatchinskaya twice red banner of orders Suvorov and Kutuzov air division
- 277th assault Krasnoselsk red banner of orders of Suvorov and Kutuzov air division
- 278th bombardment Siberian-Stalin red banner order of Suvorov air division
- 279th bombardment red banner air division
- 280th bomber air division
- 280th mixed Ostrovskaya air division
- 280th assault Ostrovskaya air division
- 281st assault Novgorod red banner air division – activated August 1942 from the VVS/4th Army, assigned to 13th Air Army April 1944. In May 1945, in the Lithuanian SSR, the division comprised three assault aviation regiments of Il-2s: the 448, 703rd, and 872nd. Redesignated the 281st Military Transport Aviation Division on 27 April 1946 and resubordinated to Headquarters Airborne Forces (which appears to have controlled all military transport aircraft at the time.)
- 282nd bombardment Gomel red banner order of Suvorov air division
- 283rd bombardment Kamyshinskaya red banner order of Suvorov air division
- 284th night bomber Novosokolnicheskaya air division
- 284th bombardment air division
- 285th bomber air division
- 286th bombardment Nezhinskaya red banner order of Suvorov air division
- 287th bombardment air division
- 288th bombardment Pavlograd- Viennese red banner order of Suvorov air division – also 288th Fighter Aviation Division
- 289th assault Nikopol' red banner air division
- 290th Assault Aviation Division
- 291st mixed air division
- 291st assault Kiev air division
- 292nd assault Krasnogradskaya air division
- 293rd bomber Cherkass air division
- 294th bombardment Poltavsko-Alexandriyskaya air division
- 295th bombardment Novomoskovsk red banner order of Kutuzov air division
- 296th bombardment air division
- 297th fighter air defence division (PVO)
- 298th fighter air defence division (PVO)
- 299th assault Nezhinskaya red banner order of Suvorov air division
- 300th assault Tomashuvskaya order of Suvorov air division
- 301st bomber Gomel order of Kutuzovair division
- 302nd bombardment Kirovograd air division
- 303rd bombardment Smolensk red banner air division
- 304th Cherkass Bomber Aviation Division – Activated March 1943 as the 304th Bomber Aviation Division. 6.43 renamed 304th Fighter Aviation Division. Under 7th Fighter Aviation Corps, 6.43 – 10.44; 6th Guards Fighter Aviation Corps, 10.44 – 3.47. On 27.10.44 renamed 23rd Guards Fighter Aviation Division. Disbanded March 1947.
- 305th assault Pavlograd red banner air division
- 306th assault lower-Dneprovsk red banner order of Suvorov air division
- 307th assault Leeds red banner order of Suvorov air division
- 308th assault Kraków red banner order of Suvorov air division
- 309th bombardment Smolensk red banner air division
- 310th fighter air defence division (PVO)
- 311th assault Molodechnenskaya red banner air division
- 312th night bomber Znamenskaya order of Suvorov air division
- 313th night bomber Bezhitskaya air division
- 314th night bomber Polotsk red banner order of Kutuzov air division
- 315th bombardment Riga air division
- 316th assault Mukdenskaya air division
- 317th fighter air defence division (PVO)
- 318th fighter air defence division (PVO)
- 319th fighter air defence division (PVO)
- 320th fighter air defence division (PVO)
- 321st bomber air division
- 322nd bombardment Minsk red banner order of Suvorov air division
- 323rd bombardment Baranovichskaya red banner air division
- 324th bombardment Svirskaya red banner air division
- 325th night bomber Osovetskaya red banner order of Suvorov air division
- 326th night bomber Tarnopolskaya order of Kutuzov Aviation Division
- 327th bomber Gdansk air division
- 328th fighter air defence division (PVO)
- 329th bombardment Kerch red banner air division
- 330th bombardment Ostrovskaya air division
- 331st bombardment Lvov air division
- 332nd assault Vitebsk red banner air division
- 334th bomber Leningrad red banner order of Suvorov air division
- 335th assault Vitebsk order of Lenin red banner order of Suvorov air division
- 336th bombardment Kovelskaya red banner air division

== Guards ==
=== Guards Bomber ===
- 1st Guards Kirovograd Red Banner Order of Bogdan Khmelnitsky Bomber Aviation Division – formed 18 March 1943 from 263rd Bomber Aviation Division
- 2nd Guards Stalingrad Red Banner Night Bomber Aviation Division – formed 26 March 1943 from 272nd Night Bomber Aviation Division, became 15th Guards Assault Aviation Division 7 September 1944
- 2nd Guards Sevastopol-Berlin Bomber Aviation Division – formed 26 March 1943 from the 17th Long-range Aviation Division, converted to bomber aviation division 26 December 1944, fought at Konigsberg and Berlin
- 3rd Guards Smolensk Orders of Suvorov and Kutuzov Bomber Aviation Division – formed 3 September 1943 from the 204th Bomber Aviation Division, fought at Second Smolensk, Operation Bagration, Vitebsk-Orsha, Minsk, Vilnius, Siauliai, Memel, East Prussian, Konigsberg
- 4th Guards Borisov Red Banner Bomber Aviation Division – formed 3 September 1943 from 223rd Bomber Aviation Division, fought at Operation Bagration, Vitebsk-Orsha, Minsk, Riga, Baltic, Memel, East Prussian, Konigsberg
- 5th Guards Orsha Red Banner Order of Kutuzov Bomber Aviation Division – formed 3 September 1943 from 285th Bomber Aviation Division, fought at Operation Bagration, Minsk, Riga, Baltic, Memel, East Prussian, Konigsberg
- 6th Guards Taganrog Red Banner Orders of Suvorov and Kutuzov Bomber Aviation Division – formed 23 October 1943 from 270th Bomber Aviation Division, fought at Nikopol-Krivoy Rog, Crimean Offensive, Operation Bagration, Vitebsk-Orsha, Minsk, Vilnius, East Prussian, Konigsberg
- 7th Guards Sevastopol-Berlin Bomber Aviation Division – formed 26 December 1944 by renaming 7th Guards Long Range Aviation Division, fought at Budapest, East Pomeranian, Upper Silesian, Konigsberg, Berlin
- 8th Guards Cherkassy Red Banner Order of Suvorov Bomber Aviation Division – formed 5 February 1944 from 293rd Bomber Aviation Division
- 9th Guards Stalingrad-Rechitsa Red Banner Order of Suvorov Night Bomber Aviation Division – formed 19 August 1944 from 271st Night Bomber Aviation Division, fought at Vistula-Oder Offensive
- 11th Guards Orel-Berlin Red Banner Bomber Aviation Division – formed 26 December 1944 from 1st Guards Long-range Aviation Division
- 13th Guards Dniepropetrovsk-Budapest Order of Suvorov Bomber Aviation Division – formed 26 December 1944 from 3rd Guards Long-range Aviation Division
- 14th Guards Bryansk-Berlin Red Banner Bomber Aviation Division – formed 26 December 1944 from 4th Guards Long-range Aviation Division
- 15th Guards Gomel Bomber Aviation Division – formed 26 December 1944 from 5th Guards Long-range Aviation Division
- 16th Guards Stalingrad Bomber Aviation Division – formed 26 December 1944 from 6th Guards Long-range Aviation Division
- 18th Guards Orel-Budapest Bomber Aviation Division – formed 26 December 1944 from 8th Guards Long-range Aviation Division
- 22nd Guards Donbass Red Banner Bomber Aviation Division – formed 26 December 1944 from 9th Guards Long-range Aviation Division, fought at Berlin

=== Guards Fighter ===
- 1st Guards Fighter Stalingrad-Berlin Red Banner Aviation Division – Activated 5.42 as the 220th Fighter Aviation Division. 4 February 1943 renamed 1st Guards Fighter Aviation Division.
- 2nd Guards Fighter Stalingrad Red Banner Air Defence Division (PVO) – Activated 11.41 as 102nd Fighter Aviation Division PVO, redesignated 2nd Guards Fighter Aviation Division PVO 3.43; fought in the Kerch–Eltigen Operation, Crimean Offensive, Romania
- 3rd Guards Fighter Bryansk Red Banner Order of Suvorov Air Division – Formed 18 March 1943 from 210th Fighter Aviation Division, fought in Operation Kutuzov, Operation Bagration, Vitebsk–Orsha Offensive, Šiauliai Offensive, Riga Offensive, Baltic Offensive, Battle of Memel, East Prussian Offensive, Berlin Offensive
- 4th Guards Fighter Orsha Red Banner Order of Suvorov Air Division – Formed 21 March 1943 from 274th Fighter Aviation Division, fought in Operation Kutuzov, Operation Bagration, Vitebsk-Orsha, Minsk, Siauliai, Riga, Baltic, Memel, East Prussian and Berlin Offensives
- 5th Guards Fighter Valdai Red Banner Order of Kutuzov Air Division – Formed 18 March 1943 from 239th Fighter Aviation Division, fought in Operation Bagration, Vitebsk-Orsha, Polotsk, Riga, Memel, East Prussian, Konigsberg Offensives
- 6th Guards Fighter Don-Segedskaya Red Banner Order of Suvorov Air Division – Formed June 1942 from 268th Fighter Aviation Division, fought in Donbass Strategic Offensive, Nikopol-Krivoy Rog Offensive, Crimean Offensive, Lvov-Sandomierz, Debrecen, Budapest, Vienna, Bratislava-Brno, Prague
- 7th Guards Fighter Rzhevskaya Red Banner Orders of Suvorov and Kutuzov Air Division – Formed 1 May 1943 from 209th Fighter Aviation Division, fought in Velikiye Luki, Operation Iskra, Belgorod-Kharkov, Vitebsk-Orsha, Bagration, Sandomierz-Silesian, Berlin, Prague
- 8th Guards Fighter Kiev Red Banner Orders of Suvorov and Bogdan Khmelnitskiy Aviation Division – Formed 8 May 1943 from 217th Fighter Aviation Division, fought at Kursk, Belgorod-Kharkov, Kiev, Zhitomir-Berdichev, Korsun-Cherkassy Pocket, Lvov-Sandomierz, Dukla Pass, Sandomierz-Silesian, Lower Silesian, Upper Silesian, Berlin, Prague
- 9th Guards Mariupolsko-Berlin Order of Lenin Red Banner Order of Bogdan Khmelnitskiy Fighter Aviation Division. Converted from 216th Fighter Aviation Division. Activated Dec 1942 as the 216th SAD; 7 Jun 1943 renamed 9th Guards IAD; 'Mariupol-Berlin,' orders of Lenin, Red Banner, Bogdan Khmelnitskiy. As 9 Gds IAD, fought well using U.S. P-39 Airacobras. Fought as part of 4th Air Army.
- 10th Guards Fighter Stalingrad Red Banner Order of Suvorov Air Division – formed 24 August 1943 from 201st Fighter Aviation Division, fought at Kursk, Belgorod-Kharkov, Donbass Strategic, Dnieper, Kiev, Korsun-Cherkassy Pocket, Nikopol-Krivoy Rog, Odessa, Lvov-Sandomierz, Jassy-Kishinev, Dukla Pass, Prague
- 11th Guards Dnipropetrovsk Red Banner Order of Bogdan Khmelnitskiy Fighter Air Division – Activated 5.42 as the 207th Mixed Aviation Division, but a few days later (20.5.42) renamed 207th Fighter Aviation Division. 24.8.43 renamed 11th Guards Fighter Aviation Division. 10.1.49 renamed 195th Guards Fighter Aviation Division; April 1968 renamed back to 11 GvIAD. Southern Group of Forces/36th Air Army 1956–1991.
- 12th Guards Fighter Znamenskaya Red Banner Order of Bogdan Khmelnitskiy Air Division – Activated 5 February 1944 from 203rd Fighter Aviation Division, fought at the Battle of the Korsun–Cherkassy Pocket, Uman-Botosani, Lvov-Sandomierz, Dukla Pass, Sandomierz-Silesian, Lower Silesian, Upper Silesian, Berlin, Prague; with 2nd Fighter Aviation Corps 5.45; disbanded 1947
- 13th Guards Fighter Poltava-Alexandriyskaya Red Banner Order of Kutuzov Air Division – Activated 2 July 1944 from 294th Fighter Aviation Division, fought in Jassy-Kishinev, Belgrade, Debrecen, Budapest, Spring Awakening, Bratislava-Brno, Prague
- 14th Guards Fighter Kirovograd-Budapest Red Banner Order of Suvorov Aviation Division – Activated 2 July 1944 from 302nd Fighter Aviation Division, fought in Jassy-Kishinev, Belgrade, Debrecen, Budapest, Spring Awakening, Bratislava-Brno, Prague
- 15th Guards Stalingrad Red Banner Order of Bogdan Khmelnitsky Fighter Aviation Division – Activated 19 August 1944 from 235th Fighter Aviation Division, fought in Jassy-Kishinev, Dukla Pass, Prague
- 16th Guards Svirskaya Red Banner Fighter Aviation Division. Activated 11.42 as the 258th Fighter Aviation Division. 27.2.43 renamed 258th Mixed Aviation Division. 24.8.43 renamed 1st Guards Mixed Aviation Division. 11.11.44 renamed 16th Guards Fighter Aviation Division. Comprised 19th Guards Fighter Aviation Regiment, 20th Guards Fighter Aviation Regiment, and 152nd Fighter Aviation Regiment in May 1945. Moved to Damgarten, DDR, in October 1953 and remained as part of Group of Soviet Forces in Germany until 30 October 1993. On that date it was moved to Millerovo, in the North Caucasus Military District and became part of the 4th Air Army.
- 22nd Guards Kirovograd Order of Lenin Red Banner Order of Kutuzov Fighter Aviation Division – formed 27 October 1944 from 205th Fighter Aviation Division, fought at Dukla Pass, Vistula-Oder, Sandomierz-Silesian, Lower Silesian, Breslau, Upper Silesian, Berlin, Prague
- 23rd Guards Cherkassy Red Banner Order of Bogdan Khmelnitsky Fighter Aviation Division – formed 27 October 1944 from 304th Fighter Aviation Division, fought at Dukla Pass, Vistula-oder, Sandomierz-Silesian, Lower Silesian, Upper Silesian, Berlin, Prague

=== Guards Assault ===
- 1st Guards Stalingrad Order of Lenin Twice Red Banner Orders of Suvorov and Kutuzov Assault Aviation Division – formed 18 March 1943 from 226th Assault Aviation Division, fought at Donbass Strategic Offensive, Nikopol-Krivoy Rog, Crimea, Operation Bagration, Vitebsk-Orsha, Minsk, Vilnius, East Prussian, Koenigsberg, East Pomeranian Offensive
- 2nd Guards Chernigov-Rechitskaya Order of Lenin Red Banner Order of Suvorov Assault Aviation Division – formed 18 March 1943 from 228th Assault Aviation Division, fought at Kursk, Operation Kutuzov, Operation Bagration, Berlin
- 3rd Guards Valdai-Kovel Red Banner Order of Suvorov Assault Aviation Division – formed 18 March 1943 from the 243rd Assault Aviation Division, fought at Operation Bagration, Lublin-Brest, Vistula-Oder, East Pomeranian, Berlin
- 4th Guards Kiev Red Banner Order of Kutuzov Assault Aviation Division – formed 1 May 1943 from 212th Assault Aviation Division, fought at Belgorod-Kharkov, Second Kiev, Zhitomir-Berdichev, Korsun-Cherkassy Pocket, Lvov-Sandomierz, Budapest, Vienna, Bratislava-Brno, Prague
- 5th Guards Zaporizhia Red Banner Order of Suvorov Assault Aviation Division – formed 1 May 1943 from the 267th Assault Aviation Division, fought at Kursk, Belgorod-Kharkov, Donbass Strategic Offensive, Nikopol-Krivoy Rog, Lvov-Sandomierz, Vistula-Oder, Lower Silesian, Upper Silesian, Berlin, Prague
- 6th Guards Zaporizhia Twice Red Banner Orders of Suvorov and Bogdan Khmelnitsky Assault Aviation Division – formed 24 August 1943 from the 290th Assault Aviation Division, fought at Donbass, Nikopol-Krivoy Rog, Odessa, Lvov-Sandomierz, Vistula-Oder, Lower Silesian, Upper Silesian, Berlin, Prague
- 7th Guards Debrecen Red Banner Assault Aviation Division – formed 3 September 1943 from 232nd Assault Aviation Division, fought at Second Smolensk, Jassy-Kishinev, Debrecen, Budapest, Vienna, Prague, Bratislava-Brno
- 8th Guards Poltava Red Banner Order of Bogdan Khmelnitsky Assault Aviation Division – formed 5 February 1944 from the 266th Assault Aviation Division, fought at Korsun-Cherkassy Pocket, Uman-Botosani, Lvov-Sandomierz, Dukla Pass, Lower Silesian, Upper Silesian, Berlin, Prague
- 9th Guards Krasnogradsky Red Banner Order of Suvorov Assault Aviation Division – formed 5 February 1944 from 292nd Assault Aviation Division, fought at Korsun-Cherkassy Pocket, Uman-Botosani, Lvov-Sandomierz, Dukla Pass, Sandomierz-Silesian, Lower Silesian, Upper Silesian, Berlin, Prague
- 10th Guards Voronezh-Kiev Red Banner Orders of Suvorov and Kutuzov Assault Aviation Division – formed 5 February 1944 from 291st Assault Aviation Division, fought at Lvov-Sandomierz, Jassy-Kishinev, Belgrade
- 11th Guards Nezhinskaya Red Banner Order of Suvorov Assault Aviation Division – formed 19 August 1944 from the 299th Assault Aviation Division, fought at Operation Bagration, East Pomeranian Offensive, Berlin Offensive
- 12th Guards Roslavl Red Banner Order of Bogdan Khmelnitsky Assault Aviation Division – formed 27 October 1944 from the 231st Assault Aviation Division, fought at Budapest, Vienna, Prague and Bratislava-Brno
- 15th Guards Stalingrad Red Banner Assault Aviation Division – formed 7 September 1944 from the 2nd Guards Stalingrad Red Banner Night Bomber Division, fought in Prague Offensive

=== Other Guards ===
- 1st Guards Svir Red Banner Mixed Aviation Division – formed 24 August 1943 from 258th Mixed Aviation Division, fought at Svir-Petrozavodsk and Petsamo-Kirkenes, became 16th Guards Fighter Aviation Division 11 November 1944
- 10th Guards Transport Aviation Division GVF
- 21st Guards Port Arthur Transport Aviation Division

== Aviation divisions formed post-war ==
Source : Michael Holm

=== Assault ===
- 172nd Kuban Red Banner Order of Suvorov Assault Aviation Division – formed 1949 from 230th ShAD, became 172nd IBAD 1956
- 186th Assault Aviation Division – formed 1949 from 253rd ShAD, became 186th IAD PVO 1956

=== Guards Bomber ===
- 1st Guards Bomber Aviation Division – formed from 1st Guards Assault Aviation Division April 1956
- 164th Guards Bomber Aviation Division – formed 1949 from 1st Guards Bomber Aviation Division, disbanded 1960
- 177th Guards Bomber Aviation Division – formed 1949 from 8th Guards Bomber Aviation Division, disbanded 1960

=== Bomber ===
- 21st Bomber Aviation Division – activated 1979 in Dzhida, disbanded 2002
- 32nd Bomber Aviation Division – formed 1960 from 32nd IAD
- 36th Bomber Aviation Division – formed 1988 from 36th Fighter Bomber Aviation Division, disbanded 1992
- 56th Bomber Aviation Division – activated 1984, to Ukraine 1992
- 83rd Bomber Aviation Division – formed from 83rd Mixed Aviation Division 1980, disbanded 2001
- 149th Bomber Aviation Division – formed from 149th Fighter-Bomber Aviation Division 1982
- 157th Bomber Aviation Division – activated 1954, became 157th Training Bomber Aviation Division 1956
- 183rd Bomber Aviation Division – activated 1954, disbanded 1960
- 289th Bomber Aviation Division – formed from 289th ADIB 1988, to Ukraine 1992

=== Fighter-Bomber ===
- 36th Fighter-Bomber Aviation Division – activated August 1984, renamed 36th Bomber Aviation Division 1988
- 39th Fighter-Bomber Aviation Division – activated 1981, disbanded 1993
- 149th Fighter-Bomber Aviation Division – formed from 149th IAD 1960, renamed 149th BAD 1982
- 172nd Kuban Red Banner Order of Suvorov Fighter-Bomber Aviation Division – formed from 172nd ShAD 1956, disbanded 1961
- 289th Fighter-Bomber Aviation Division – formed from 289th ShAD 1956, renamed 289th BAD 1988

=== Fighter ===
- 4th Fighter Aviation Division – activated 1.12.73 in Ivano-Frankovsk, Ivano-Frankovsk Oblast. 14th Air Army/Carpathian Military District.
- 95th Fighter Aviation Division – formed from 95th SmAD 1954, disbanded 1988

=== Mixed ===
- 10th Mixed Aviation Division – activated 1970 at Ucharal, Alma-Ata Oblast. Redesignated 10th Fighter Aviation Division in 1980.
- 24th Mixed Aviation Division - activated 9.70 in Taldy-Kurgan, Taldy-Kurgan Oblast, Central Asian Military District. Became 24th Fighter-Bomber Aviation Division 1980.
- 83rd Mixed Aviation Division – activated 1972, renamed 83rd BAD 1980
- 95th Mixed Aviation Division – activated 1949, became 95th IAD 1954

=== Transport, Bomber Training ===
- 3rd Guards Military Transport Aviation Division
- 12th Military Transport Aviation Division
- 18th Guards Military Transport Aviation Division
- 157th Training Bomber Aviation Division – formed from 157th BAD 1956, disbanded 1961

== See also ==
- ru:Список авиационных дивизий военно-воздушных сил СССР (1941–1945)

== Sources ==
- Pan'kin V.E. Evolution of organisational structure of AirForce, and ways and methods of ruling and cooperation in Great Patriotic War years (rus)
- List of aviation divisions
- Red Army Air Force organization(rus)
- Kozlov, M.M., (ed.), Great Patriotic War 1941–1945 (Russian), encyclopaedia, Moscow, Soviet Encyclopaedia (pub.), 1985
- Svischev, V.N. Gen. Maj. Aviation, Preparation of USSR for war (Russian) Организация военно-воздушных сил СССР перед войной, 2002
- Wagner, R. (ed.), Fetzer, L., (trans.), The Soviet Air Force in World War II: The official history, Wren Publishing Pty.Ltd., Melbourne, 1973
