= Vladimir Serov (pilot) =

Soviet fighter pilot

- Владимир Георгиевич Серов
- Born: 19 July 1922; Kurganinsk, Kuban Oblast, RSFSR
- Died: 26 June 1944 (aged 21); Vyborgsky District, Leningrad Oblast, RSFSR, USSR
- Military career
- Allegiance: Soviet Union
- Branch: Soviet Air Force
- Service years: 1941–1944
- Rank: Senior lieutenant
- Conflicts: World War II
- Awards: Hero of the Soviet Union

Vladimir Georgievich Serov (Russian: Владимир Георгиевич Серов; 19 July 1922 – 26 June 1944) was a Soviet fighter pilot and deputy squadron commander in the 159th Fighter Aviation Regiment during World War II who was credited with 39 solo and six shared aerial victories.

== Early life ==
Serov was born on 19 July 1922 to a Russian peasant family in Kurganinsk. After completing his eighth grade of school he trained at an aeroclub and worked as a handyman before entering the military in 1941. That year he graduated from the Krasnodar Military Aviation School of Pilots.

== World War II ==
In April 1942 he was deployed to the warfront with the 159th Fighter Aviation Regiment, and on 30 August that year he gained his first aerial victory - the shared kill of a Bf 109. However, it was not until November that he gained his first solo shootdown - another Bf 109. He went on to gain another shootdown two days later, which turned out to be his last aerial victory on the Curtiss P-40 Warhawk. Eventually in May the next year he tallied his first kill on the new La-5, and from then on he quickly increased his tally, often gaining two shootdowns in a day; throughout the battle of Leningrad he engaged in intense aerial battles, especially in early 1944. In April 1944 he was nominated for the title Hero of the Soviet Union for completing 203 sorties, engaging in 53 dogfights, and tallying 20 solo plus six shared shootdowns. However, being awarded the title posthumously in August rapidly increased his tally during the intense battle for the Karelian Isthmus. Accounts of his last flight differ - some sources claims he shot down two enemy aircraft before fatally ramming another, but those claims are not reflected in his official tally, which indicates the shootdown of one Bf 109 on 26 June 1944 before he was killed in action.

Despite arriving on the warfront as an ordinary pilot with the rank of sergeant and participating in the conflict for barely two years before he was killed in action, he quickly rose through the ranks to the position of deputy squadron commander and rank of senior lieutenant; his final tally accumulated through the course of approximately 300 sorties and 104 dogfights officially stands at 39 solo and six shared shootdowns, including Bf 109, Bf 110, Ju 87, Ju 88, He 111, and FW 190 aircraft.

== Awards ==
- Hero of the Soviet Union (2 August 1944)
- Order of Lenin (2 August 1944)
- Order of the Red Banner (2 May 1943 and 5 April 1944)
- Order of Alexander Nevsky (17 June 1944)
- Order of the Patriotic War 1st class (26 July 1943)
- campaign medals
