= Kacha Military Aviation School =

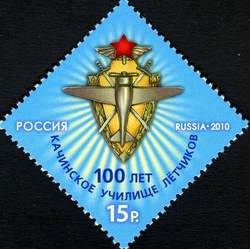
Stamp issued for 100 years of the school, showing its insignia

The Kacha Higher Military Aviation twice Red Banner order of Lenin School of Pilots named for A.F. Myasnikov (KVVAUL) (Качинское высшее военное авиационное дважды краснознаменное ордена Ленина училище летчиков им. А.Ф. Мясникова (КВВАУЛ)) was a flying training school of the Soviet Air Forces. It was operational under various names from 1910-97.

The school was established on 21 November 1910 at Sevastopol as the Sevastopol Aviation Officer School.

It gained the name of the Kacha School in 1938. From 1945, after it was evacuated during the Second World War, to 1997 it was headquartered at Stalingrad (1945–61, later renamed Volgograd (1961 onwards)), and was part of the Air Forces of the North Caucasus Military District. From 1960-December 1997 it had three (sometimes four) flying training regiments (704th (Kotelnikovo, Volgograd Oblast), 706th, 707th at Lebyazhye initially, 122nd activated later).

The Kachin Flight School was disbanded in accordance with the order of the Minister of Defense of the Russian Federation Igor Sergeev No. 397 of November 6, 1997.

During the celebration of the 100th anniversary of Russian aviation and the Kachinsky School in November 2010, Russian Defense Minister Anatoly Serdyukov signed an order naming the Krasnodar Aviation School after Kachinsky, but the renaming did not happen.

Part of the school’s infrastructure continued to serve the Armed Forces of the Russian Federation: in Volgograd, the training buildings were given to the 20th Guards Motor Rifle Division, the ShMAS buildings (school of junior aviation specialists) in Kamyshin were given to the 242nd Guards Motor Rifle Zaleshchitsky Regiment, the airfield and training regiment in the city Kotelnikovo was reassigned to the Krasnodar VVAUL, the Beketovka airfield became a sports airfield.

On the disbandment of the school in 1997-98 the 706th Training Aviation Regiment was transferred to the Krasnodar Military Aviation Institute. It was still active under the Krasnodar Military Aviation Institute in January 2000.
