= Field army =

Type of military formation

NATO Map Symbols

a friendly army
a hostile army

A field army (also known as numbered army or simply army) is a military formation in many armed forces, composed of two or more corps. It may be subordinate to an army group. Air armies are the equivalent formations in air forces, and fleets in navies. A field army is usually composed of 80,000 to 300,000 soldiers.

== History ==
Specific field armies are usually named or numbered to distinguish them from "army" in the sense of an entire national defence force or land force. In English, the typical orthographic style for writing out the names of field armies is word numbers, such as "First Army"; whereas corps are usually distinguished by Roman numerals (e.g. I Corps) and subordinate formations with ordinal numbers (e.g. 1st Division). A field army may be given a geographical name in addition to or as an alternative to a numerical name, such as the British Army of the Rhine, Army of the Potomac, Army of the Niemen or Aegean Army (also known as the Fourth Army).

The Roman army was among the first to feature a formal field army, in the sense of a very large, combined arms formation, namely the sacer comitatus, which may be translated literally as "sacred escort". The term is derived from their being commanded by Roman emperors (who were regarded as sacred), when they acted as field commanders. While the Roman comitatensis (plural: comitatenses) is sometimes translated as "field army", it may also be translated as the more generic "field force" or "mobile force" (as opposed to limitanei or garrison units).

In some armed forces, an "army" is or has been equivalent to a corps-level unit. Prior to 1945, this was the case with a gun (軍; 'army') within the Imperial Japanese Army, for which the formation equivalent in size to a field army was a hōmen-gun (方面軍; 'area army'). In the Soviet Red Army and the Soviet Air Forces, an army was subordinate in wartime to a front (an equivalent of army group). It contained at least three to five divisions along with artillery, air defense, reconnaissance and other supporting units. It could be classified as either a combined arms army (CAA) or tank army (TA); and while both were combined arms formations, the former contained a larger number of motorized rifle divisions while the latter contained a larger number of tank divisions. In peacetime, a Soviet army was usually subordinate to a military district.

Modern field armies are large formations which vary significantly between armed forces in size, composition, and scope of responsibility. For instance, within NATO a field army is composed of a headquarters, and usually controls at least two corps, beneath which are a variable number of divisions. A battle is influenced at the field army level by transferring divisions and reinforcements from one corps to another to increase the pressure on the enemy at a critical point. NATO armies are commanded by a general or lieutenant general.

== See also ==
- Armeeoberkommando
- Military unit
- Military history
- List of numbered armies
