= Gigant =

Gigant is the word for giant in a number of languages. It is derived from the Greek mythological giants, the gigantes (Greek: γίγαντες).

It may also refer to:

- Gigant, nickname of Messerschmitt Me 323, a German transport aircraft
  - Gigant, nickname of Messerschmitt Me 321, a German transport glider, predecessor of the Me 323 above
- Gigant, nickname of Hungarian MÁV Class V63 series of trains
- FC Gigant Belene, an association football club based in Belene, Bulgaria
- FC Gigant Grozny, a defunct association football club based in Grozny, Russia
- FC Gigant Voskresensk, a defunct association football club based in Voskresensk, Russia
- Gigant (rural locality), several rural localities in Russia
- Gigant, a large missile launcher in the Japanese Kamen Rider Agito tokusatsu series
- Gigant, a Japanese manga series written by Hiroya Oku
- Gigant Edge, a boss in several Kirby video games.
- Muisky Gigant, a mountain in Buryatia

== See also ==
- Flettner Gigant, an experimental German helicopter
- Gigant Neo (b. 1998), a Swedish breeding stallion
- Gigantism
