= 159th Fighter Aviation Regiment =

159th Fighter Aviation Regiment (1940–1972); 114th Fighter Aviation Regiment (1972–1992)
- Active: 1940–1992
- Country: Soviet Union
- Branch: Soviet Air Forces
- Type: Aviation regiment
- Engagements: World War II
- Decorations: Order of the Red Banner
- Honorifics: Tallinn

Commanders
- Notable commanders: Pyotr Pokryshev

The 159th Tallinn Red Banner Fighter Aviation Regiment (Russian: 159-й истребительный авиационный Таллинский Краснознамённый полк) was a fighter regiment of the Soviet Air Force during World War II and the Cold War.

== Formation and World War II ==
The 159th Fighter Aviation Regiment was formed between 24 September and 20 November 1940 at the Grivochki airfield in Dnovsky District, part of the Air Forces of the Leningrad Military District. Under the command of Major Ivan Voronin, the regiment included four squadrons, organized according to shtat (table of organization and equipment) 15/21. The regiment was formed from pilots of the 44th and 49th Fighter Aviation Regiments and the 161st Reserve Aviation Regiment, equipped with the Polikarpov I-16, in accordance with a directive dated 25 June 1940 expanding the air force. The pilots of the regiment began retraining on the Mikoyan-Gurevich MiG-3 in December, handing over their I-16s to the 158th Fighter Aviation Regiment (IAP) in January 1941. The regiment received 60 MiG-3s between 5 February and 25 May, and was assigned to the 5th Mixed Aviation Division of the district air forces on 31 May.

When Operation Barbarossa began on 22 June 1941, the regiment entered combat with the division, as the district air forces became the Air Forces of the Northern Front. Three days later, Lieutenant A. G. Shevtsov claimed the regiment's first victory, a Heinkel He 111 bomber downed in air battle in the Novgorod area. With the 5th Mixed Aviation Division, the regiment flew 450 combat sorties with the loss of thirteen aircraft and three pilots. On 14 July the regiment was transferred to the 39th Fighter Aviation Division (IAD) of the Air Forces of the Northern Front. It was reorganized according to shtat 015/134 in August, and during that month Major Konstantin Sokol took command. When the Northern Front was split on 24 August the regiment, with the 39th IAD, became part of the Air Forces of the Leningrad Front. With the 39th IAD, the regiment flew 2,653 combat sorties with the loss of 42 aircraft and fifteen pilots.

Having lost 47 MiG-3s, the regiment handed over its remaining aircraft to other regiments and was sent to the rear for rebuilding with 27th Reserve IAP at Kadnikov on 20 September. The regiment was selected to be retrained on the American P-40 Tomahawk fighter and reorganized according to shtat 015/174 between 1 and 13 December. The pilots of the regiment departed for the Leningrad Front on 13 December and on 31 December the regiment fielded twenty Tomahawks, of which two were non-operational. The regiment reentered combat as part of the Air Forces of the front's 8th Army on 28 February 1942.

During 1942, the regiment received Kittyhawk fighters as replacements, losing nineteen Tomahawks and fifteen Kittyhawks while it operated the American aircraft. In November 1942 Major Ilya Kirpichnikov became regimental commander. With the Air Forces of the 8th Army, the regiment flew 1,323 combat sorties with the loss of 26 aircraft and seven pilots. On 2 December the regiment was transferred to the 275th IAD of the front's 13th Air Army. The pilots of the regiment were sent to the 2nd Reserve IAP at Seyma to retrain on the Lavochkin La-5 on 14 December. The regiment was reorganized according to shtat 015/284 between 1 and 20 February. Sokol returned to command the regiment in March. The 159th IAP resumed combat operations with the 275th IAD on 18 March. On 29 June Sokol was replaced by flying ace and Hero of the Soviet Union Major Pyotr Pokryshev. Pokryshev received a rare second Hero of the Soviet Union award but on 24 August suffered serious injuries that took him out of flying combat missions in the crash of a UTI-4 trainer.

The regiment took part in the Krasnoye Selo–Ropsha offensive in January 1944 and in June supported the Vyborg–Petrozavodsk offensive on the Karelian Isthmus. During the summer of 1944 the 159th supported the Narva offensive, the Tartu offensive, and the Tallinn offensive into Estonia. On 11 September 1944 the regiment received a squadron of ten Kittyhawks from the 191st IAP, departing for the Karelian Front, which were operationally subordinated to the 159th. For its performance in the battle for Tallinn, the regiment received the name of the city as an honorific on 22 October. With the 275th IAD, the regiment flew 4,256 combat sorties with the loss of 80 aircraft and 41 pilots from 2 December 1942 to the end of its combat service. The regiment lost 78 La-5s and two UTI-4s in 1943 and 1944. The 159th did not see combat from November to the end of the war, covering the coast of Estonia and remaining in readiness to reinforce the Soviet aviation forces in Courland. Major Vasily Khodaryev became regimental commander in November. The regiment was awarded the Order of the Red Banner on 16 December for its performance in the capture of Saaremaa. From 28 April to 4 June the regiment retrained on the Yakovlev Yak-9 and was reorganized according to shtat 015/364.

During the war, the regiment flew 8,681 combat sorties, the majority in 1941 and 1942 in defense of stationary targets and the majority in 1944 providing air cover for ground troops. The regiment lost 161 aircraft during the war, of which 107 were combat losses, mainly in air battles. 66 pilots were killed, mostly in air battles.

== Postwar ==
After the end of the war, the 159th IAP received 29 Yak-9T and 16 Yak-9U fighters. The regiment remained based in Estonia with the 275th IAD. The division was part of the 76th Air Army until December 1956 when it transferred to the 30th Air Army. The regiment and its division were transferred to the 36th Air Army of the Southern Group of Forces in Hungary on 15 August 1957. From September 1961 the regiment was directly subordinated to the air army headquarters after the disbandment of the division headquarters. In late 1968 the regiment was transferred to the 131st Fighter Aviation Division of the Central Group of Forces in Czechoslovakia. It was redesignated the 114th Fighter Aviation Regiment on 21 July 1971. As Soviet forces withdrew from Czechoslovakia, the regiment was sent to Ivano-Frankivsk in Ukraine, part of the Carpathian Military District, on 21 January 1991. There, it become part of the 4th Fighter Aviation Division. In January 1992 it became part of the Ukrainian Air Force, where it was later reorganized as the 114th Tactical Aviation Brigade in 2003.

== Commanders ==
The following officers commanded the regiment:

- Major Ivan Alekseyevich Voronin (from 1 September 1940)
- Major Konstantin Porfiryevich Sokol (from 30 May 1942)
- Major Pyotr Afanasyevich Pokryshev (17 March 1943–September 1944)
- Major Vasily Mikhailovich Khodaryev (from November 1944)
- Lieutenant Colonel Karl Karlovich Kerro (from 14 December 1946)
- Lieutenant Colonel Ivan Ivanovich Yefremov (from 14 August 1950)
- Lieutenant Colonel Yakov Filipovich Mukhin (from 27 April 1951)
- Major Aleksandr Vasilyevich Shumlin (from 16 December 1953)
- Lieutenant Colonel Yegor Vasilyevich Vasilyevsky (from 7 February 1956)
- Lieutenant Colonel Mikhail Khrisanfovich Kulikov (from 3 October 1958)
- Lieutenant Colonel Konstantin Davidovich Machavariani (from 17 May 1965)
- Lieutenant Colonel Aleksandr Mikhailovich Batakov (from 14 October 1967)
- Lieutenant Colonel Yury Vasilyevich Kulikov (from 1 September 1968)
- Lieutenant Colonel Leonid Vladimirovich Dlugach (from 21 March 1971)
- Lieutenant Colonel Vladimir Gennadyevich Shkanakin (from 19 November 1973)
- Lieutenant Colonel Valery Ivanovich Zhavoronkov (from 8 October 1976)
- Lieutenant Colonel Vladimir Maksimovich Kochegarov (from 1 March 1979)
- Colonel Igor Petrovich Grishalevich (from 11 March 1982)
- Lieutenant Colonel Anatoly Lukyanovich Chuyev (from 3 July 1984)
- Lieutenant Colonel Valentin Leonidovich Matyushenko (from 15 January 1988)
