= Gigant (Sovkhoz) =

Sovkhoz in Salsky District, Russia

Gigant (Russian: Гигант, IPA: [ɡʲɪˈɡant]; lit. 'giant') is a sovkhoz located in the rural locality of Gigant in Salsky District of Rostov Oblast, Russia. The Gigant was the first grain sovkhoz.

It was established by the Soviet Union, and was created following the dissolution of the New Economic Policy (NEP). The Gigant was memorable for representing the shift from peasant-run farms to state-run farms (sovkhoz) and collective farms (kolkhoz) in Joseph Stalin's first five-year plan.

The sovkhoz, built in a remote section of Russia, included a central village and 12 smaller settlements in which the workers and their families lived. The locality contains a population of 10,249 people as of 2011.

Sovkhozes such as Gigant are state-run farms, and are contrasted from kolkhozes, which are owned and run by a collective of peasants. Workers on sovkhozes were wage earners and received fixed payments in cash. Because of this, they belonged to trade unions. Sovkhozes also tended to be specialized and have scientifically trained staff members. In these ways, the process of collectivizing farms with the sovkhozes was an attempt to elevate peasant populations into a class resembling their urban, proletariat counterparts.

== History ==
=== Background ===
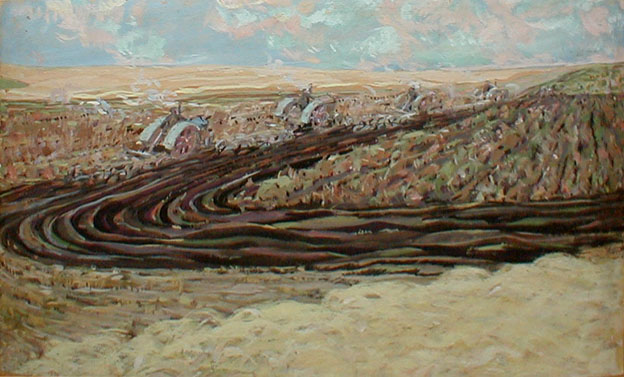
Painting of Gigant by Peter Semenovich Dobrynin, 1940

Before the Soviet Union moved towards mass collectivization of agriculture, the "New Economic Policy" (NEP) allowed for a limited market system, letting agricultural production be peasant-run. Although this policy did not align with the socialist ideology of the soviet state, it was in practice successful from its start in 1921 until 1926. In 1928, Joseph Stalin implemented his first five-year plan: a series of policies intending to produce the rapid industrialization of the Soviet Union. In this plan, urban populations would sharply rise and workers would be expected of increased labor production. Because of this, urban demand for food began to rise. In the same year, the NEP resulted in a grain procurement crisis where the amount of grains available for purchase were inadequate to support the demand of city workers.

In 1929, Stalin responded to the grain crisis by editing his five-year plan to include the mass conversion of farms independently run by peasants into of kolkhoz and sovkhoz farms similar to Gigant. This collectivization replaced the NEP. The creation of these farms dismantled the kulak class of rich peasants, in a process known as dekulakization. This collectivization was met with strong resistance from many peasants, with many killing their farm animals and burning their crops rather than turning them over to the state. The collectivization policies led to several famines, which in turn caused what is estimated to be millions of deaths.

=== Creation of the Gigant ===
On July 11, 1928, the Communist Party adopted a resolution titled "On the Organization of New Grain Sovkhoz", which set an expectation for 1928 to sharply increase total plowing area. This resolution led to a decree titled "On the Organization of Large Grain Farms" on August 1, 1928, which set a goal of reorganizing Soviet farms. By the 1933 harvest, at least 1,650,000 tons of marketable grain would be produced. By the end of 1928, 10 grain sovkhozes were created, the first of which was the Gigant.

While the Gigant would see relative success and would be praised as a symbol of the merits of state-run farms, several other grain sovkhozes had problems. Due to poor provision of equipment and a lack of qualified management, farming came with notable difficulty. But the success of these farms bore the burden of representing proof that gigantic state farms could be profitable in the mind of the Soviet public, as well as being the figures exhibiting the superiority of state and collective farm complexes over individualized leadership. This led to the overworking of several farms throughout their early years, which made them seem successful at first but also led to soil degradation and a decrease in overall yield.

=== During the first five-year plan ===
While the state had already developed some state farms before the Gigant, this was the first large grain state farm in the USSR. 240,000 hectares were allocated from land unoccupied by peasants. Only about 10 percent of the land was developed and ready for farming, and the location in the Rostov Oblast was an extremely remote region. The workers of the state farm transformed this area into the largest grain factory in the world. In order to create such a large farm, the USSR hired Thomas D Campbell, a US citizen who owned the world's largest farm outside of Russia, as a consultant. Notably, the Gigant is seven times the size of the Campbell farm. Because the USSR had not yet industrialized, in order to develop such a large section of land, the USSR bought agricultural machines from the United States.

By the spring of 1929, the state farm could sustain a productive harvest, reaping an average 2500 lbs per hectare. while neighboring farms on average produced 1500 lbs. As a symbol of the effectiveness of collectivized farming over peasant-run farming, the Gigant's success was made representative of the transition towards state-run farms. The news that the Gigant had nearly doubled the harvest of the area was spread quickly throughout the USSR, making it a tourist attraction. In 1930 alone, the Gigant was visited by 50,000 tourists.

In 1931, an agricultural school was established at the Gigant, and many of the workers in the sovkhoz became its first students.

By 1934, the area of the Gigant's fields was 2,600 square kilometers – the size of Luxembourg. Because of this colossal size, the farm was split into four independent sovkhozes – Gigant, Salsky, Tselinsky, and Yolovsky, leaving Gigant with a land area of 500 square kilometers.

=== 1940s - present ===
During World War II, Nazi occupants destroyed the Gigant farm during the battle of Rostov. It took ten years to restore the farm.

From 1955 to 1985, Dmitry Angeliev lead the farm and achieved high numbers of production. For these results, the Gigant was twice awarded high government awards: in 1966, the Order of Lenin and in 1978, the Order of the Red Banner of Labor.

The state farm was eventually disbanded with the fall of the Soviet Union. In 1997, the Gigant was transformed into an agricultural cooperative named after Angeliev. The cooperative became the legal successor of the sovkhoz Gigant. In 2007, it was separated into an independent agricultural enterprise "Slavyane."

== Reception and legacy ==
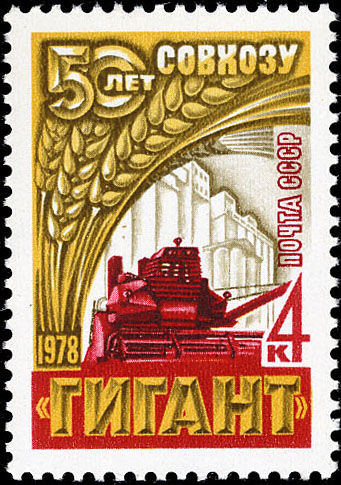
USSR postage stamp of Gigant, 1978

Upon its creation, the Gigant's huge size fostered positive hopes for collectivized farming in the Soviet Union. Although the transition away from peasant-operated farms was a divisive one, leftist thinkers abroad saw the creation of the Gigant as emblematic of the new program's success. Created during the industrializing period of the five-year plan, the size of the farm was seen as representative of socialism's capability to match the output of the capitalist world.

In the United States, The Nation, then a left wing publication, portrayed the Gigant in an extremely positive light. Writer Louis Fischer praised it as a success in that it showed that socialist grain production would be able to provide for the increasing number of laborers needed for industrialization. As well as using it as a beacon for socialist success, Fischer presented the Gigant, and other collectivized farms, as a civilizing and urbanizing force for peasants. In his view, peasants were a class overly dependent on capitalistic structures and did not fit with proletariat plans from the government. The collectivization, then, was seen by leftists as a means to transform peasants into proletariats.

The collectivization process in the USSR in the 1930s lead to widespread famines, with a death toll from these ranging in the millions. Because of its status as representing the onset of collectivization in this period, the long-term legacy of the Gigant does not hold the same optimism as it held in its early years.

Throughout the existence of the USSR, the Gigant appeared in state propaganda from its inception until much later on. In 1929, director Lydia Stepanova made a documentary film "Gigant" featuring the sovkhoz. In 1978, the USSR introduced a postage stamp featuring the farm to commemorate its 50th anniversary.
