= Salsk =

Town in Rostov Oblast, Russia

Salsk Сальск
- Town
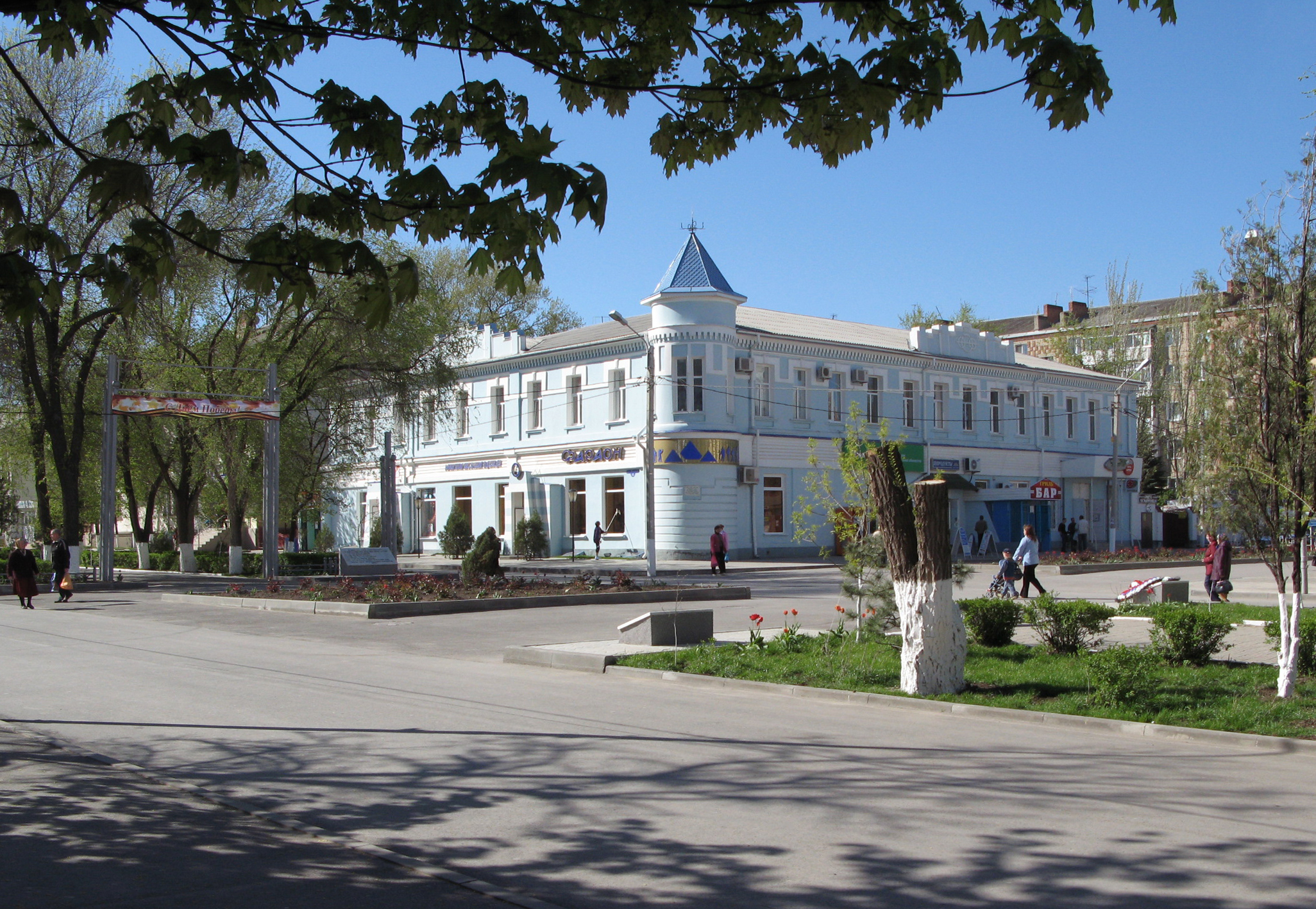
- On the Lenina Street in central Salsk

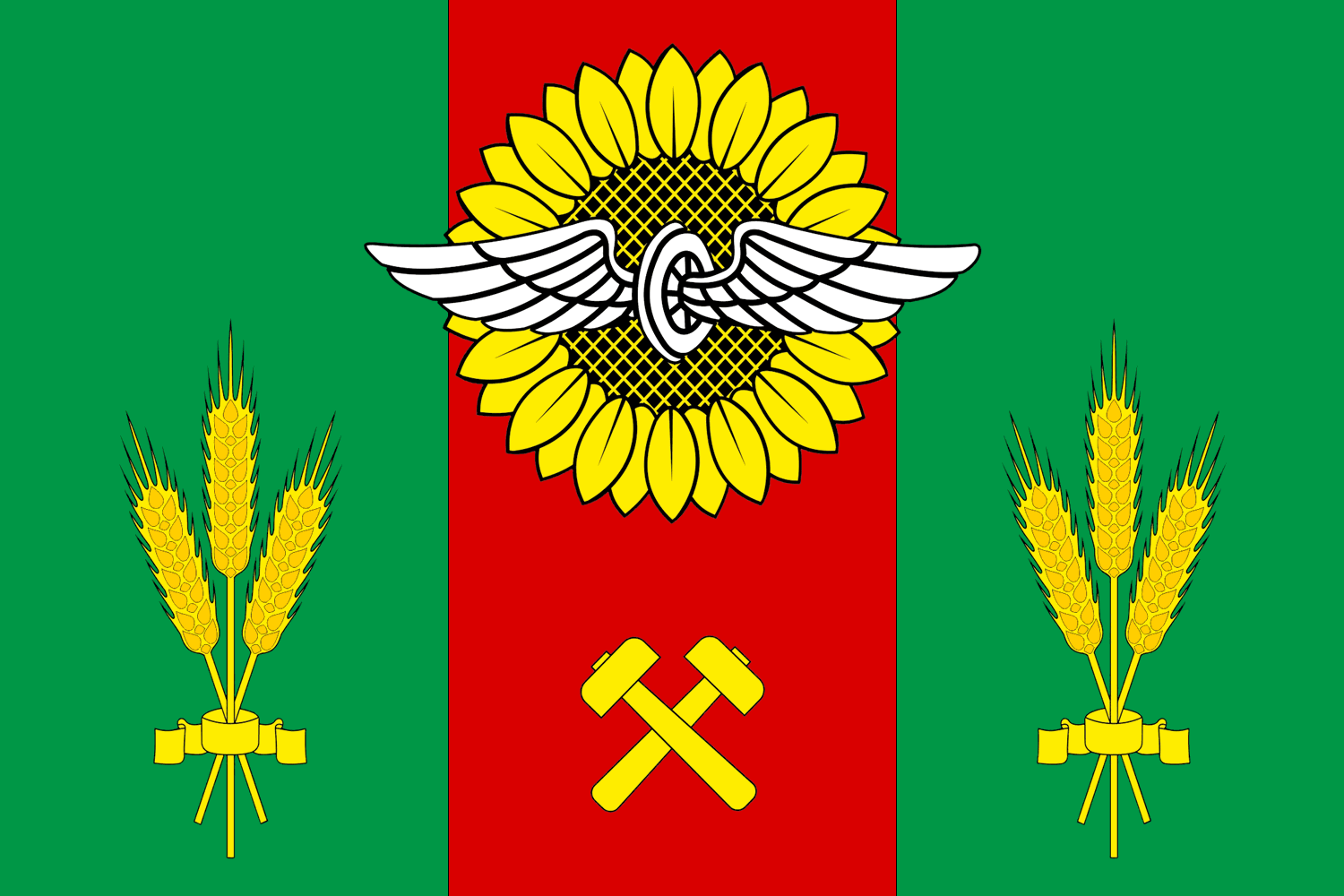
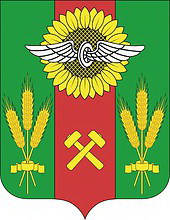
- Flag Coat of arms
- Interactive map of Salsk
- Location of Salsk Salsk (Rostov Oblast)
- Coordinates: 46°26′N 41°35′E
- Country: Russia
- Federal subject: Rostov Oblast
- Administrative district: Salsky District
- Urban settlementSelsoviet: Salskoye
- Founded: 1899
- Town status since: 1926
- Elevation: 40 m (130 ft)

Population (2010 Census)
  - Total: 61,316
  - Estimate (2025): 56,605 (−7.7%)

Administrative status
  - Capital of: Salsky District, Salskoye Urban Settlement

Municipal status
  - Municipal district: Salsky Municipal District
  - Urban settlement: Salskoye Urban Settlement
  - Capital of: Salsky Municipal District, Salskoye Urban Settlement
- Time zone: UTC+3 (MSK)
- Postal codes: 347630–347634, 347636, 347639, 347640, 347649, 347659
- OKTMO ID: 60650101001
- Website: adm-salsk.ru

Salsk (Russian: Сальск) is a town and the administrative center of Salsky District in Rostov Oblast, Russia, located on the Sredny Yegorlyk River (Don's basin), 180 kilometers (110 mi) southeast of Rostov-on-Don, the administrative center of the oblast. Population: 56,832 (2020), 61,316 (2010 census); 61,775 (2002 census); 61,088 (1989 Soviet census).

== History ==
Historical affiliations

Russian Empire 1899–1917
Russian Republic 1917
Soviet Russia 1917–1922
Soviet Union 1922–1991
Russian Federation 1991–present

It was established as a settlement serving Torgovaya (Торго́вая) railway station, which opened in 1899. It was granted town status and renamed Salsk in 1926. Salsk was occupied by Nazi Germany from July 31, 1942 as a part of the operation known as Case Blue.

== Administrative and municipal status ==
Within the framework of administrative divisions, Salsk serves as the administrative center of Salsky District. As an administrative division, it is incorporated within Salsky District as Salskoye Urban Settlement. As a municipal division, this administrative unit also has urban settlement status and is a part of Salsky Municipal District.
