= Renhe Subdistrict, Gaotang County =

Renhe Subdistrict 人和街道
- Subdistrict
- Location in Shandong Renhe Subdistrict (China)
- Coordinates: 36°52′37″N 116°14′33″E
- Country: People's Republic of China
- Province: Shandong
- Prefecture-level city: Liaocheng
- County: Gaotang County
- Time zone: UTC+8 (China Standard)

Renhe Subdistrict (Chinese: 人和街道; pinyin: Rénhé Jiēdào) is a subdistrict in Gaotang County, Liaocheng, Shandong, China. As of 2020, it administers the following five residential neighborhoods and four villages:

- Quanlin Community (泉林社区)
- Jinxing Community (金兴社区)
- Kangle Community (康乐社区)
- Yucai Community (育才社区)
- Jincheng Community (金城社区)
- Hexing Village (和兴村)
- Shengshi Village (盛世村)
- Heping Village (和平村)
- He'an Village (和安村)

== See also ==
- List of township-level divisions of Shandong
