= Guhe, Gaotang County =

Guhe 固河镇
- Town
- Location in Shandong Guhe (China)
- Coordinates: 36°54′16″N 116°24′20″E
- Country: People's Republic of China
- Province: Shandong
- Prefecture-level city: Liaocheng
- County: Gaotang
- Time zone: UTC+8 (China Standard)

Guhe (Chinese: 固河镇) is a town in Gaotang County, Liaocheng, in western Shandong province, China.
