= Gigant, Rostov Oblast =

Gigant Гигант
- Rural-type settlement
- Interactive map of Gigant
- Location of Gigant Gigant (Rostov Oblast)
- Coordinates: 46°30′30″N 41°20′30″E
- Country: Russia
- Federal subject: Rostov Oblast
- Administrative district: Salsky District
- Selsoviet: Gigant rural settlement
- Founded: 1915
- Rural-type settlement status since: 2004
- Elevation: 75 m (246 ft)

Population (2010 Census)
  - Total: 10,249
  - Estimate (2021): 10,572 (+3.2%)
- Time zone: UTC+3 (MSK)
- Postal code: 347628
- OKTMO ID: 60650412101

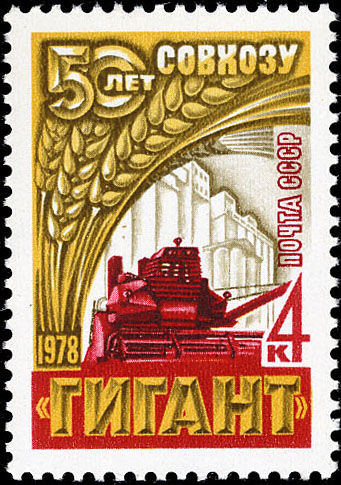
1978 Soviet stamp celebrating Gigant sovkhoz

Gigant (Russian: Гигант) is a rural locality in Salsky District of Rostov Oblast, Russia. Population: 10,249 (2010 census); Gigant, one of the largest Sovkhoz in Russia, covering an area of 460 square kilometres (180 sq mi; 110,000 acres) is located in Gigant.

== Climate ==
Climate data for Gigant (extremes 1939-present)
| Month | Jan | Feb | Mar | Apr | May | Jun | Jul | Aug | Sep | Oct | Nov | Dec | Year |
|---|---|---|---|---|---|---|---|---|---|---|---|---|---|
| Record high °C (°F) | 16.5 (61.7) | 21.1 (70.0) | 29.9 (85.8) | 34.3 (93.7) | 36.8 (98.2) | 39.6 (103.3) | 41.7 (107.1) | 41.2 (106.2) | 39.4 (102.9) | 35.1 (95.2) | 22.5 (72.5) | 18.7 (65.7) | 41.7 (107.1) |
| Mean daily maximum °C (°F) | 0.5 (32.9) | 2.0 (35.6) | 8.8 (47.8) | 17.2 (63.0) | 23.2 (73.8) | 28.2 (82.8) | 31.2 (88.2) | 30.8 (87.4) | 24.3 (75.7) | 16.3 (61.3) | 7.2 (45.0) | 2.1 (35.8) | 16.0 (60.8) |
| Daily mean °C (°F) | −2.6 (27.3) | −1.9 (28.6) | 3.7 (38.7) | 11.0 (51.8) | 17.1 (62.8) | 21.9 (71.4) | 24.7 (76.5) | 24.1 (75.4) | 17.9 (64.2) | 10.9 (51.6) | 3.5 (38.3) | −0.9 (30.4) | 10.8 (51.4) |
| Mean daily minimum °C (°F) | −5.1 (22.8) | −4.9 (23.2) | −0.1 (31.8) | 5.8 (42.4) | 11.5 (52.7) | 16.0 (60.8) | 18.5 (65.3) | 17.8 (64.0) | 12.4 (54.3) | 6.7 (44.1) | 0.7 (33.3) | −3.3 (26.1) | 6.3 (43.4) |
| Record low °C (°F) | −33.5 (−28.3) | −31.4 (−24.5) | −21.2 (−6.2) | −7.4 (18.7) | −2.1 (28.2) | 4.1 (39.4) | 7.7 (45.9) | 5.0 (41.0) | −2.3 (27.9) | −10.4 (13.3) | −30.8 (−23.4) | −29.9 (−21.8) | −33.5 (−28.3) |
| Average precipitation mm (inches) | 39.9 (1.57) | 33.5 (1.32) | 38.0 (1.50) | 34.9 (1.37) | 58.8 (2.31) | 52.1 (2.05) | 50.3 (1.98) | 36.3 (1.43) | 40.5 (1.59) | 46.4 (1.83) | 40.3 (1.59) | 44.1 (1.74) | 515.1 (20.28) |
Source: pogoda.ru.net
