= Yinji, Shandong =

Yinji 尹集镇
- Town
- Location in Shandong Yinji (China)
- Coordinates: 36°54′07″N 116°19′12″E
- Country: People's Republic of China
- Province: Shandong
- Prefecture-level city: Liaocheng
- County: Gaotang
- Time zone: UTC+8 (China Standard)

Yinji (Chinese: 尹集镇) is a town in Gaotang County, Liaocheng, in western Shandong province, China.
