= 76th Air Army =

13th Air Army VVS LVO 76th Air Army
- 76-й Краснознамённой Воздушной армии
- Active: 13th Air Army: 25 Nov. 1942 – 10 Jan. 1949; 76th Air Army: 1949–1980; VVS LVO: 1980–1988; 76th Air Army: 1988–1998
- Branch: Soviet Air Force
- Part of: Leningrad Front; Leningrad Military District

Commanders
- Notable commanders: General-Colonel S. D. Rybal'chenko (13th Air Army) former commander of the Far Eastern VVS and the Far East Military District during 1950–1956

The 76th Air Army was a unit of the Soviet Air Forces from 1949 to 1980, and again from 1988 to 1998. As the 13th Air Army, it was originally formed on 25 November 1942 and based on air units of the Leningrad Front.

13th Air Army's initial components were the 275th Fighter Aviation Division, 276th Bomber Aviation Division, and 277th Assault Aviation Divisions.

As the 13th Air Army, the formation participated in a number of offensives in 1943–45:

- Operation Iskra - 12–30 January 1943. 13th Air Army supported the 67th Army's attack.
- Leningrad-Novgorod Offensive - January 1944.
- Vyborg–Petrozavodsk Offensive - 13th Air Army, 1,600 aircraft strong, made an attack on the German positions on 9 June 1944, a day before the main assault. Glantz also states that 13th Air Army provided pre-offensive fighter cover to discourage enemy aerial reconnaissance which might have uncovered the offensive's maskirovka measures. The offensive lasted from 10 June to 9 August 1944.
- Narva Offensive (July 1944)
- Tallinn Offensive
- Moonsund Landing Operation

During the war, the 13th Air Army made 120,000 sorties. Ten units of the army were transformed into Guards units for their services. Twenty units were awarded decorations. 151 pilots were awarded the Heroes of the Soviet Union, and one, Pyotr Pokryshev won the award twice. The 13th Air Army had but one commander throughout World War II. Stepan Dmitrievich Rybalchenko appears initially to have been a General-Major upon his appointment as commander. He was promoted to General-Lieutenant с 07.08.43, and General-Colonel с 02.11.44.

== 13th Air Army components during World War II ==
Allaces.ru gives the following composition of the Air Army:

- 273rd Fighter Gomel Order of Suvorov Air Division (25 Dec 1942 – May 1943)
- 275th Fighter Air Division Pushkinskaya Krasnoznamennaya
- 276th Bomber Gatchinskaya twice Red Banner Orders of Suvorov and Kutuzov Air Division
- 277th Assault Krasnoselskaya Krasnoznamennaya Orders of Suvorov and Kutuzov Air Division
- 281st Assault Novgorod Red Banner Air Division - activated August 1942 from the VVS/4th Army, assigned to 13th Air Army April 1944. In May 1945, in the Lithuanian SSR, the division comprised three assault aviation regiments of Il-2s: the 448, 703rd, and 872nd. Redesignated the 281st Military Transport Aviation Division on 27 April 1946, and resubordinated to Headquarters Airborne Forces (which appears to have controlled all military transport aircraft at the time.)
- 269th Fighter Air Division Novgorod Krasnoznamennaya (269 иад) (26 Feb – Apr, 1944)
- 13th Separate Reconnaissance Leningrad Red Aviation Regiment (13 орап)
- 407th Mixed Aviation Regiment (Nov 1942 – Mar 1943)
- 914-D Mixed Aviation Regiment (Nov 1942 – Mar 1943)
- 915th Mixed Aviation Regiment (Nov 1942 – Mar 1943)
- 987th Mixed Aviation Regiment (Nov 1942 – Mar 1943)
- 5th separate Distant Reconnaissance Aviation Squadron (5 одраэ) (Jan 1943)
- 10th Separate Fighter Aviation Squadron (Jan 1943)
- 12th Separate Fighter Squadron (12 окраэ) (25 Mar 1942 – 14 Jun 1944)
- 240th Fighter Nevel Red Banner Order of Suvorov Division (240 иад) (19 Apr – 11 Jul, 1943)
- 742nd Separate Reconnaissance Ostrovsky Red Aviation Regiment (742 орап) (Feb–Apr 1944)
- 87th Separate Night Bomber Squadron «Tasuja» («The Avenger") (87 онбаэ) (Jul 1944 – May 1945)
- 553rd Army Communications Aviation Squadron (553 оааэс) (Jul 1944 – May 1945)

The 119th Fighter Aviation Division was subordinated to 13th Air Army from May 1942 – August 1943.

On 1 May 1945, according to the Combat composition of the Soviet Army, the army consisted of:

- 281st Assault Aviation Division
- 275th Fighter Aviation Division
- 13th Reconnaissance Aviation Regiment
- 199th Communications Aviation Regiment
- 1583rd, 1674th Anti-Aircraft Artillery Regiments

== Postwar and redesignation as 76th Air Army ==
In July 1945, three Aviation Divisions joined 13th Air Army in the Leningrad Military District from 1st Air Army:

- 276th Bomber Aviation Division
- 277th Assault Aviation Division
- 330th Fighter Aviation Division. 330th 'Ostravskaya' IAD was part of 13th and 76th Air Armies in 7.1945 – 1.1949 (13th Air Army), and January 1949 – 3.1952 (76th Air Army).

In January 1949, 13th Air Army was redesignated as the 76th Air Army.

In 1988, according to Feskov et al., the 76th Air Army comprised the 67th Bomber Aviation Regiment, the 66th (Veshchevo) and 722nd (Smuravyevo) Fighter-Bomber Aviation Regiments, 98th Guards Independent Reconnaissance Aviation Regiment (Monchegorsk), and the 138th Composite Aviation Regiment (Levashovo). The 66th Fighter-Bomber Aviation Regiment transferred to the Baltic Fleet as the 66th independent Maritime Assault Aviation Regiment in December 1989. 149th Bomber Aviation Division arrived back from Szprotawa, Poland in July 1992 to supervise the 67th, 98th Guards, and 722nd Regiments, but was disbanded in 1998.

The Air Army was disbanded on June 1, 1998, when it was merged with the 6th Independent Air Defence Army of the now-Russian Air Defence Forces, also headquartered in Sankt Petersburg, to form the 6th Army of Air Forces and Air Defence.
