= Gaotang County =

Gaotang 高唐县 Kaotang
- County
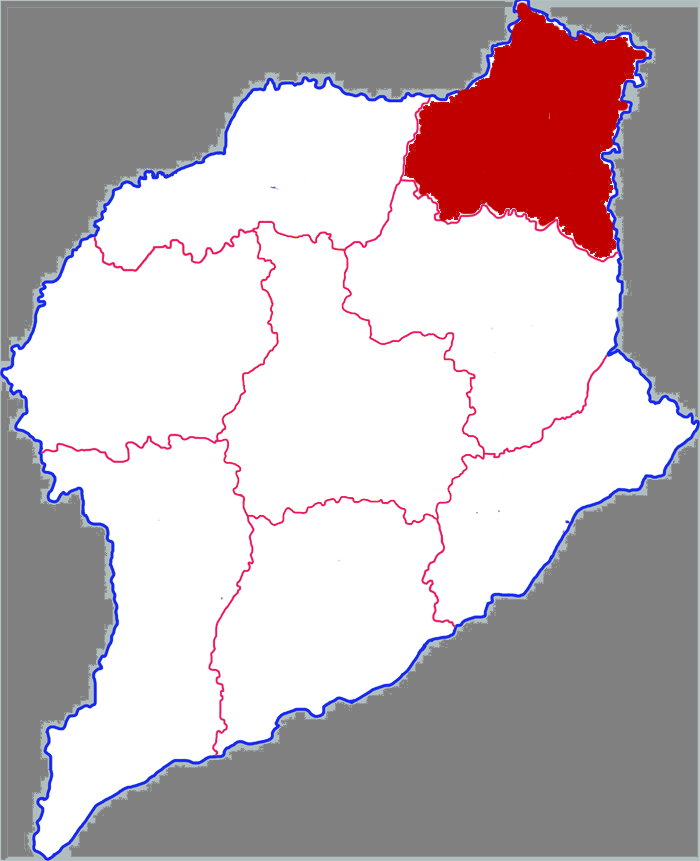
- Location in Liaocheng

- Location in Shandong
- Coordinates: 36.866°N 116.231°E
- Country: People's Republic of China
- Province: Shandong
- Prefecture-level city: Liaocheng

Area
  - Total: 949 km^{2} (366 sq mi)

Population (2019)
  - Total: 496,000
  - Density: 523/km^{2} (1,350/sq mi)
- Time zone: UTC+8 (China Standard)
- Postal Code: 252800

Gaotang County (simplified Chinese: 高唐县; traditional Chinese: 高唐縣; pinyin: Gāotáng Xiàn) is a county of northwestern Shandong province, People's Republic of China. It is administered by Liaocheng City.

The population was 473,400 in 2010 (2010 Census).

== Administrative divisions ==
As of 2012, this county is divided to 3 subdistricts, 6 towns and 3 townships.

Subdistricts

- Yuqiuhu Subdistrict (鱼邱湖街道)
- Huili Subdistrict (汇鑫街道)
- Renhe Subdistrict (人和街道)

Towns

- Liangcun (梁村镇)
- Yinji (尹集镇)
- Qingping (清平镇)
- Guhe (固河镇)
- Sanshilipu (三十里铺镇)
- Bolisi (琉璃寺镇)

Townships

- Yangtun Township (杨屯乡)
- Zhaozhaizi Township (赵寨子乡)
- Jiangdian Township (姜店乡)

== Climate ==
Climate data for Gaotang, elevation 27 m (89 ft), (1991–2020 normals, extremes 1991–present)
Month	Jan	Feb	Mar	Apr	May	Jun	Jul	Aug	Sep	Oct	Nov	Dec	Year
Record high °C (°F)	17.3 (63.1)	21.9 (71.4)	28.1 (82.6)	32.7 (90.9)	38.6 (101.5)	40.7 (105.3)	41.5 (106.7)	36.5 (97.7)	35.7 (96.3)	31.9 (89.4)	25.3 (77.5)	16.1 (61.0)	41.5 (106.7)
Mean daily maximum °C (°F)	3.8 (38.8)	7.9 (46.2)	14.3 (57.7)	20.9 (69.6)	26.5 (79.7)	31.5 (88.7)	31.9 (89.4)	30.3 (86.5)	26.9 (80.4)	21.1 (70.0)	12.4 (54.3)	5.4 (41.7)	19.4 (66.9)
Daily mean °C (°F)	−2.2 (28.0)	1.5 (34.7)	7.9 (46.2)	14.6 (58.3)	20.4 (68.7)	25.3 (77.5)	26.8 (80.2)	25.3 (77.5)	20.5 (68.9)	14.2 (57.6)	6.3 (43.3)	−0.3 (31.5)	13.4 (56.0)
Mean daily minimum °C (°F)	−6.6 (20.1)	−3.3 (26.1)	2.4 (36.3)	8.8 (47.8)	14.5 (58.1)	19.6 (67.3)	22.6 (72.7)	21.3 (70.3)	15.6 (60.1)	8.9 (48.0)	1.6 (34.9)	−4.5 (23.9)	8.4 (47.1)
Record low °C (°F)	−19.2 (−2.6)	−15.0 (5.0)	−8.5 (16.7)	−2.8 (27.0)	2.9 (37.2)	8.9 (48.0)	16.5 (61.7)	12.9 (55.2)	2.9 (37.2)	−3.2 (26.2)	−17.0 (1.4)	−17.1 (1.2)	−19.2 (−2.6)
Average precipitation mm (inches)	3.1 (0.12)	7.9 (0.31)	9.9 (0.39)	29.1 (1.15)	45.5 (1.79)	75.7 (2.98)	151.8 (5.98)	136.4 (5.37)	47.8 (1.88)	30.2 (1.19)	17.7 (0.70)	4.2 (0.17)	559.3 (22.03)
Average precipitation days (≥ 0.1 mm)	1.8	3.0	2.9	5.1	6.5	7.9	11.2	9.7	6.3	4.7	4.1	2.2	65.4
Average snowy days	2.4	2.6	0.7	0.2	0	0	0	0	0	0	0.8	1.8	8.5
Average relative humidity (%)	63	59	55	62	65	64	79	84	79	71	69	67	68
Mean monthly sunshine hours	153.9	156.0	207.2	224.2	254.0	230.7	198.6	194.8	187.2	180.1	150.2	148.6	2,285.5
Percentage possible sunshine	50	51	56	57	58	53	45	47	51	52	50	50	52
Source: China Meteorological Administration
