= Smuravyevo =

Airport in Pskov Oblast, Russia

Smuravyevo
- Смуравьёво
- Gdov, Pskov Oblast in Russia

Site information
- Type: Air Base
- Owner: Ministry of Defence
- Operator: Russian Air Force

Location
- Shown within Pskov Oblast Smuravyevo (Russia)
- Coordinates: 58°48′54″N 028°0′48″E

Site history
- Built: 1960
- In use: 1960 - 2009

Airfield information
- Identifiers: ICAO: ULLG
- Elevation: 61 metres (200 ft) AMSL
Runways
Direction	Length and surface
16/34	2,500 metres (8,202 ft) Concrete

Smuravyevo (Russian: Смуравьёво) (also Gdov or Smurav'yevo) is a former airbase of the Russian Air Force and former closed city in Pskov Oblast, Russia.

== Location ==
This medium-sized base is located 14 km northeast of Gdov, 63 km south of Ivangorod and 200 km (120 mi) from Saint Petersburg.

== History ==
The symbol of the town was a Mikoyan-Gurevich MiG-21, on a plinth, and the base was home to the 722nd Bomber Aviation Regiment (722 BAP) flying Sukhoi Su-24 aircraft. The 722nd Bomber Aviation Regiment was supervised by the 149th Mixed Aviation Division, also located at the base. It was part of the 76th Air Army during collapse of Soviet Union, and after a reorganisation in 1998, the 6th Air and Air Defence Forces Army until the town's closure. In 1994, many servicemen and pilots were resettled here from the units located previously in East Germany. The town's population at the time was about 4000 residents.

Circa 2010, the base was closed.

== Closure of town and airport ==
Occurring during the 2008 reforms implemented by defence minister Anatoliy Serdyukov, locals did not welcome the closure of the airport, as it left hundreds unemployed without suitable alternatives. The gas supply for residents was cut off and the town was left to crumble. Firewood is currently used but it is an outdated and expensive option, partially due to the condition of heating systems. In 2020, the head of local municipal services, Aleksandr Moyseyev, stated that the town's buildings have been completely worn out and half of the town's residents were military retirees.

Local water systems are also in bad shape. The local water supply is unreliable, and the town's water tower has been nicknamed "The Leaning Tower of Pisa". If the tower collapses, the town will lose its water supply. As the water quality has already declined to the point where it is undrinkable, locals have been forced to get their drinking water from a spring 1.5 km outside the town, in the village of Lyubimets.

The construction of a school in the area between the town's residential buildings and the airfield was halted when the military withdrew, leaving only two out of three floors finished. Looters have been destroying the building, and according to the local residents, the current state of the school has deteriorated to the point that it seems a suitable place to make a war film.
