= Qingping, Shandong =

Qingping 清平镇
- Town
- Location in Shandong Qingping (China)
- Coordinates: 36°45′20″N 116°04′31″E
- Country: People's Republic of China
- Province: Shandong
- Prefecture-level city: Liaocheng
- County: Gaotang
- Time zone: UTC+8 (China Standard)

Qingping (Chinese: 清平镇) is a town in Gaotang County, Liaocheng, in western Shandong province, China.
