= Stepan Rybalchenko =

Stepan Dmitrievich Rybalchenko (Russian: Степа́н Дми́триевич Рыба́льченко; 11 July 1903 – 1986) was a Soviet military officer. He was active in the Red Army as a soldier during the Russian Civil War, as a Soviet Air Force general during the Second World War, and later as a military instructor.

== Biography ==
Rybalchenko was born on 11 July 1903 in the settlement of Novoyegorylskoye in the Don Host Oblast of the Russian Empire (in the present-day Rostov Oblast in Russia). A career military officer, he first joined the Red Army in his teens in 1919, taking part in the Civil War. He subsequently joined the Communist Party of the Soviet Union in 1927 and graduated from Frunze Military Academy in 1936. He served as chief of the intelligence department and Deputy Chief of Staff for the Air Force of the Leningrad Military District from 1938 to 1941.

During World War II, Rybalchenko first served as a staff officer in Leningrad. He was appointed to lead the 13th Air Army around Leningrad in the Soviet defense of the area during the Nazi siege in November 1942 and was in charge of the force as a lieutenant general when the Thirteenth Air Army, then in possession of some 400 planes, provided support for the Soviet pushback in 1944. He was promoted to the rank of colonel-general in 1944.

Rybalchenko served as a military instructor from 1956 to 1963, then retired from military service. He was awarded an Order of the October Revolution by the Presidium of the Supreme Soviet of the USSR in 1983.
