= Aviation regiment (Soviet Union) =

An Aviation Regiment (Russian: авиационный полк, aviaciónnyj polk) was a unit of the Red Army Air Force during the Second World War, the Soviet Air Forces, Soviet Air Defence Forces (PVO) and Soviet Naval Aviation. Since 1991 they remain major formations within the Russian Air Force and the Russian Naval Aviation.

Aviation regiments were constituent units of the aviation divisions and aviation corps, and, the separate aviation regiment, as part of the Air Armies. Aviation regiments were homogeneously equipped with aircraft designed for specific operations, usually bomber, assault, fighter or reconnaissance types.

The strength of aviation regiments varied significantly during Soviet-German fighting on the Eastern Front. Initially Fighter and assault air regiments consisted of four aviation squadrons of 15 aircraft each, for a total of 63 aircraft on their flight log. In the fighter regiment there were 78 pilots, in assault regiments, 82.
But heavy losses during initial stage of war and difficulties in operating such unit lead to formation of new type of regiment in the fall of 1941 - with two 10-aircraft squadrons and one aircraft for commander - 21 aircraft total. Increasing aircraft production and tendency of concentrating forces in one's hand led to increasing size of regiment in the middle of 1942 - three 10-aircraft squadrons and pair for commander - 32 aircraft total. Next year saw final reorganisation - polks consists of three 12-aircraft squadrons and command flights (and additional training and liaison aircraft) - 40-42 aircraft total, all at one airfield, similar to luftwaffe gruppe.

In fast bomber/light bomber regiments there were five squadrons of 12 aircraft each, which in all accounted for 61 aircraft and 77 crews. Long-range bomber regiments were approximately same in composition, and the heavy (bombardment) regiments had 40 aircraft.

A reconnaissance aviation regiment was organised into four squadrons of 12 aircraft, 49 in all, while the divisional signals squadron (integral to an aviation division) had 12 aircraft and one aircraft in the regiment HQ. Reconnaissance regiments had an establishment of 74 crews.

For some specialised long-term operations, mixed aviation regiments were created with two bomber or assault aviation squadrons and one or two fighter aviation squadrons.

Light night bomber squadrons, such as the Night Witches were also formed, from the summer of 1941, using Polikarpov Po-2 trainer aircraft and night reconnaissance squadrons using the Polikarpov R-5 aircraft.

The Rifle and Tank Corps air squadron had 12 reconnaissance aircraft with 18 crews. The squadrons of Front aviation consisted of flights, while those of the long-range bombers from detachments of 3 aircraft each. The number of crews in the air regiments and the Corps squadrons take into account reserve aircraft, which exceeded the number of aircraft in them by 25-50%, which made it possible in the course of combat to produce with the same number of aircraft more aircraft sorties on combat missions and to compensate the loss of crews because of the combat losses.

== Sources ==
- Pan'kin V.E. Evolution of organisational structure of AirForce, and ways and methods of ruling and cooperation in Great Patriotic War years (rus)
- Red Army Air Force organization (rus)
- Kozlov, M.M., (ed.), Great Patriotic War 1941-1945 (Russian), encyclopaedia, Moscow, Soviet Encyclopaedia (pub.), 1985
- Svischev, V.N. Gen.Maj. Aviation, Preparation of USSR for war (Russian) , 2002
- Wagner, R. (ed.), Fetzer, L., (trans.), The Soviet Air Force in World War II: The official history, Wren Publishing Pty. Ltd., Melbourne, 1973
