= Lebyazhye (air base) =

Airport in Volgograd Oblast, Russia

Lebyazhye
- Kamyshin, Volgograd Oblast in Russia
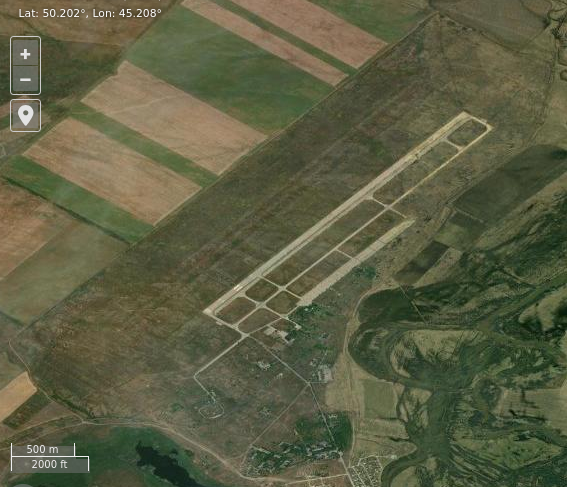
- Satellite imagery of the former Lebyazhye airbase

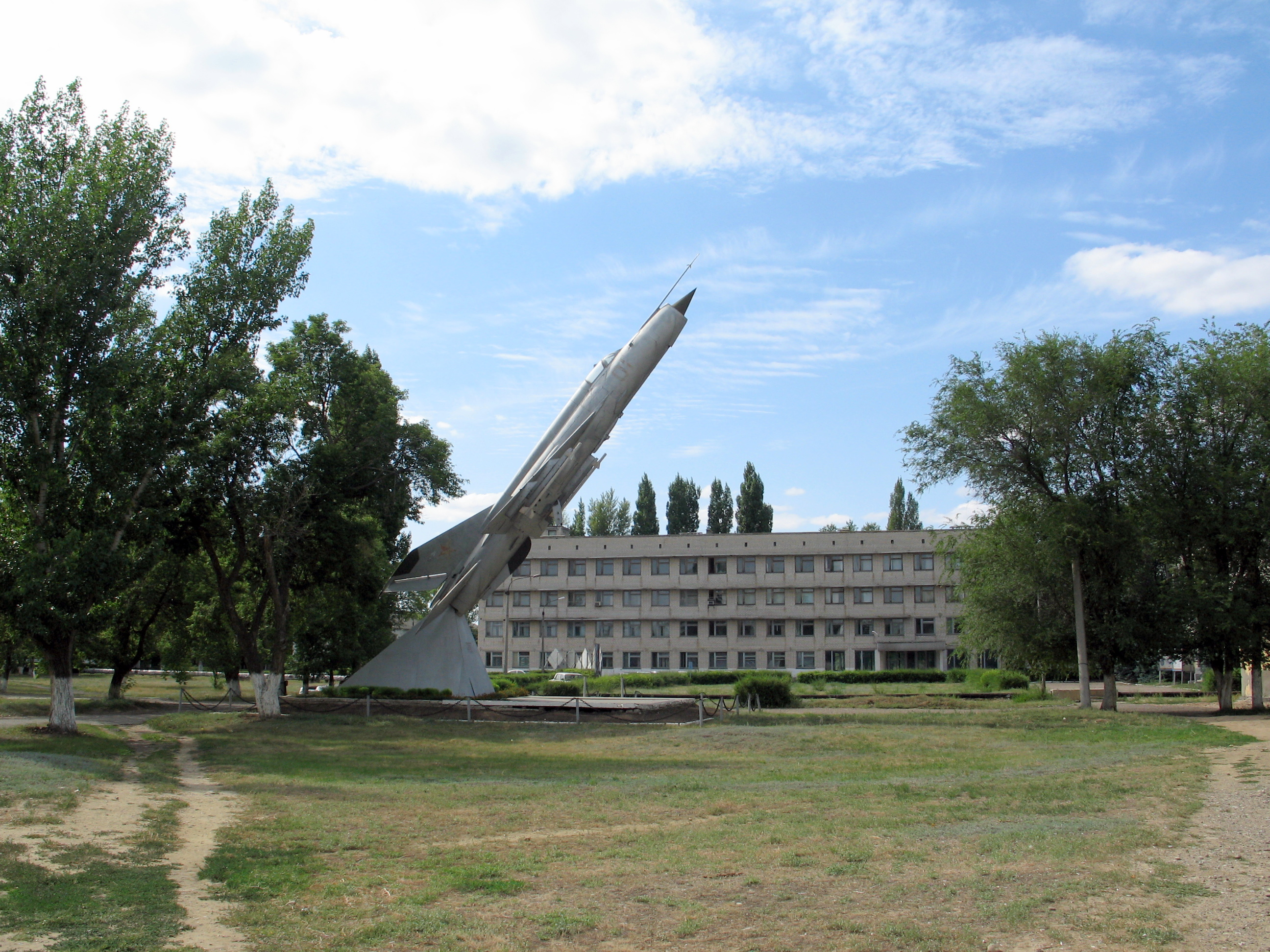
- Lebyazhye air forces buildings, 2009

Site information
- Type: Air Base
- Owner: Ministry of Defence
- Operator: Russian Air Force

Location
- Shown within Volgograd Oblast Lebyazhye (Russia)
- Coordinates: 50°12′6″N 45°12′30″E

Site history
- Built: 1991
- In use: 1991 - 2009

Airfield information
- Identifiers: ICAO: XRWL
- Elevation: 116 metres (381 ft) AMSL
Runways
Direction	Length and surface
03/21	2,500 metres (8,202 ft) Concrete

Lebyazhye (also given as Kamyshin Northwest, Lebyazh'ye, Gromovo, Kotly, and Mikhailovka) is a former air base in Russia located 18 km northwest of Kamyshin and 170 km north of Volgograd. It is near ru:Петров Вал. The base has an unusually wide runway and large tarmac space.

Aerial activity here started in the 1950s. From 1951 to 1994 the 707th Training Aviation Regiment was located the base.

The airfield was home to the 1st Guards Instructional Fighter-Bomber Aviation Regiment (1 Gv IAPIB) flying Mikoyan-Gurevich MiG-23 (ASCC: Flogger), Mikoyan MiG-27K (ASCC: Flogger-J2), and Sukhoi Su-24 (ASCC: Fencer) aircraft in the mid-1990s. It arrived from the 36th Air Army in Hungary in mid-1991. The 1 Gv IAPIB used to fall under the 1080th Training Aviation Centre for Retraining of Personnel (1080 UATs PLS) at Borisoglebsk.

3rd Bomber Aviation Regiment arrived from Szprotawa, Poland, on 4 June 1992 (where it had been part of 149th Bomber Aviation Division), and disbanded at Lebyazhe, Volgograd Oblast sometime in the later part of that year.

However, according to Air Forces Monthly in July 2007, the 1st Guards Bomber Aviation Regiment by that time had become a direct reporting unit to Russian Air Force headquarters. The regiment was absorbed by the 6970th Aviation Base on 1 September 2009.

In 2009, the equipment of the 1st Guards Bomber Aviation Regiment, in connection with the reform, was transferred to the Morozov air base, the personnel were partially added to the staff of the Morozov air base, and partially dismissed due to organizational and staffing measures.

As of 2014, there is no commandant’s office in the garrison or at the airfield, the facility is in the process of being looted.

== See also ==
- List of military airbases in Russia
