= Pyotr Pokryshev =

Soviet flying ace (1914–1967)

Pyotr Afanasyevich Pokryshev
- Пётр Афанасьевич Покрышев
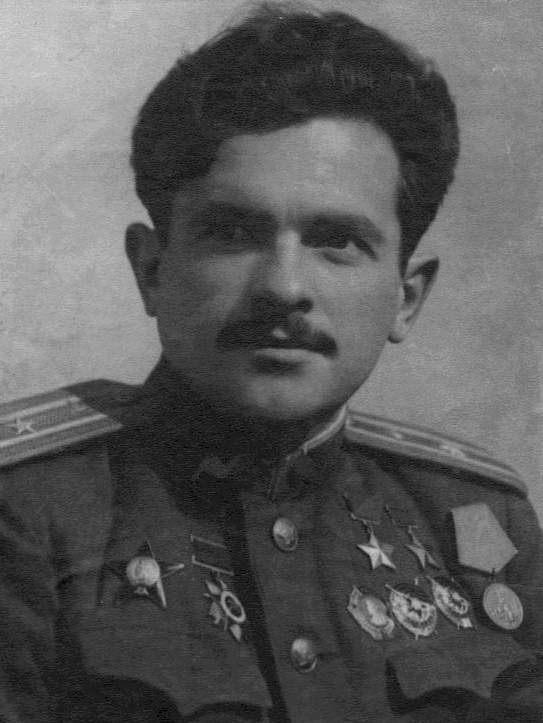
- Born: 24 August [O.S. 11 August] 1914; Hola Prystan, Taurida Governorate, Russian Empire (located within present-day Kherson oblast, Ukraine)
- Died: 22 August 1967 (aged 52); Leningrad, USSR
- Military career
- Allegiance: Soviet Union
- Branch: Soviet Air Force
- Service years: 1934 – 1961
- Rank: General-Major of Aviation
- Conflicts: World War II; Winter War; Eastern Front
- Awards: Hero of the Soviet Union (twice)

Pyotr Afanasyevich Pokryshev (Russian: Пётр Афана́сьевич Покры́шев; 24 August [O.S. 11 August] 1914 – 22 August 1967) was a fighter pilot and squadron commander in the Soviet Airforce during the Second World War who became a flying ace with 18 individual and 9 shared confirmed shootdowns who was twice awarded with the title Hero of the Soviet Union.

== Early life ==
Pokryshev was born on 24 August [O.S. 11 August] 1914 to a Ukrainian family in Hola Prystan. After completing his fifth grade of school in 1929 he worked in ship construction at a collectively owned facility in his hometown before moving to the city of Kharkhov in 1930. There, he attended trade school until 1932, after which he began working as a mechanic at a factory. In 1934 he completed training at the local aeroclub and joined the military. The next year, he graduated from the Odessa Military Aviation School of Pilots, and was then assigned to a squadron in the 1st Aviation Corps, and in July he was transferred to the 13th Separate Fighter Aviation Squadron. In 1938 he was sent to the 38th Fighter Aviation Regiment as a flight commander, but the next month he was sent to the 7th Fighter Aviation Regiment, in which flew with during the Winter War. During the conflict he flew 50 sorties on the I-16 and gained two confirmed shootdowns; one of them was a shared kill. He was shot down on 20 December 1939, but survived. He was forced to stop flying sorties for the remainder of the after a collarbone injury in January 1940. After the end of the war he remained in his regiment, and in January 1941 he was moved to the 158th Fighter Aviation Regiment and given the position of squadron commander.

== World War II ==
Within the first month of the German invasion of the Soviet Union, Pokryshev scored his first aerial victory - a shared shootdown of a He 111. It was the only aerial victory he scored during the war while flying the I-16. He soon began flying the Yak-1, and in July he scored shot down a Ju 88 flying it. He subsequently scored a shared kill on it before he was transferred to the 154th Fighter Aviation Regiment as a squadron commander and the deputy regimental commander in October. The unit was honored with the guards designation and renamed the 29th Guards Fighter Aviation Regiment in November. In December, Pokryshev gained his first aerial victory while flying the P-40 when he shot down a Bf 109. Throughout the first half of 1942 he rapidly increased his tally of victories, and on 10 July 1942 he was nominated for the title Hero of the Soviet Union for flying 211 missions and scoring several solo shootdowns, which was awarded on 10 February 1943. Many of the missions he flew were against the blockage of Leningrad. In June 1943 he was made commander of the 159th Fighter Aviation Regiment, which used the Yak-7B; that month he scored his last three confirmed aerial victories. The next month he was nominated for a second gold star, which he was awarded on 24 August 1943. That day, he was badly injured in a plane crash during a training flight. Due to the extent of his injuries he was unable to fly sorties for the remainder of the war. In total he had made 305 sorties, engaged in 38 dogfights, with 18 individual and 9 shared confirmed shootdowns; other sources credit him with more unconfirmed kills. Initially he continued to serve as a regimental commander, and in September 1944 he began he studies at the Air Force Academy in Monino, which he graduated from in August 1945.

== Postwar ==
After graduating from the air force academy in 1945, Pokryshev was made deputy commander of the 7th Guards Fighter Aviation Division. In December he was made deputy commander of the 12th Guards Fighter Aviation Division. In May 1947 he was appointed as deputy commander of the 229th Fighter Aviation Division. He left the position in 1949 to become commander of the 44th Fighter Aviation Division. In 1952 he relinquished command of the unit, and in 1954 he graduated from the Military Academy of General Staff, after which he became deputy commander of the Minsk Fighter Aviation Corps. He was sent to China in 1956 as a military advisor, where he remained until 1959. That year, he became the chief of staff of an Air Army in Leningrad. He retired from the military in 1961, after which he worked at the Leningrad Airport. During his career he flew the Yak-3, Yak-9, La-7, MiG-15, and MiG-17. He died from drowning while swimming during a vacation on 22 August 1967.

== Awards and honors ==
- Twice Hero of the Soviet Union (10 February 1943 and 24 August 1943)
- Order of Lenin (10 February 1943)
- Three Order of the Red Banner (15 January 1940, 15 March 1942, and 30 April 1954)
- Order of the Patriotic War 1st class (20 January 1943)
- Two Order of the Red Star (19 December 1941 and 20 June 1949)
- campaign and service medals

== Bibliography ==
- Mellinger, George (2006). Soviet Lend-Lease Fighter Aces of World War 2. Osprey Publishing. ISBN 978-1-84603041-3.
- Simonov, Andrey; Bodrikhin, Nikolai (2017). Боевые лётчики — дважды и трижды Герои Советского Союза. Moscow: Фонд «Русские Витязи», Музей техники Вадима Задорожного. ISBN 9785990960510. OCLC 1005741956.
