= Siversky (air base) =

Military airport in Leningrad Oblast, Russia

Siversky
- Siversky, Leningrad Oblast in Russia
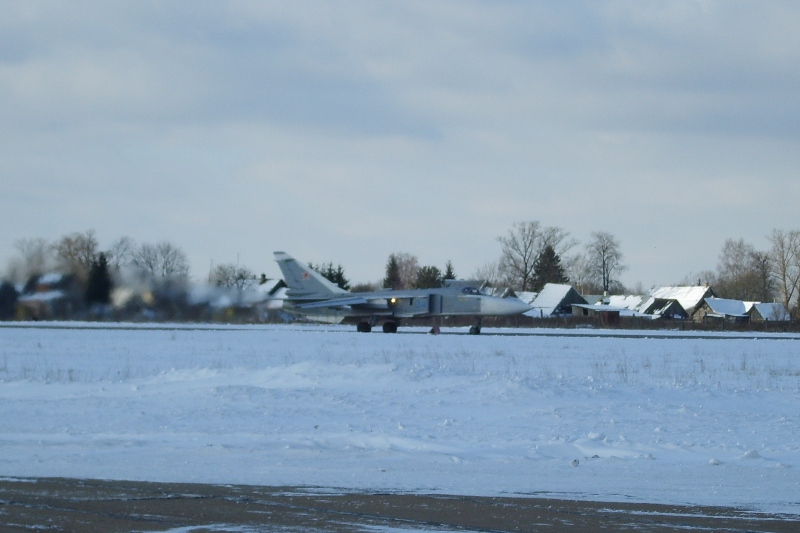

Site information
- Type: Air Base
- Owner: Ministry of Defence
- Operator: Russian Air Force

Location
- Shown within Leningrad Oblast Siversky (Russia)
- Coordinates: 59°21′24″N 030°2′12″E

Site history
- Built: 1955
- In use: 1955 - 2009

Airfield information
- Identifiers: ICAO: ULLS
- Elevation: 104 metres (341 ft) AMSL
Runways
Direction	Length and surface
05/23	2,500 metres (8,202 ft) Concrete

Siversky (ICAO: ULLS) (also Ziverskaya) is an air base in Leningrad Oblast, Russia, 2 km northwest of Siversky. It is a small airfield 65 km south of Saint Petersburg (Leningrad) and is home to the 67th Bomber Aviation Regiment, flying Sukhoi Su-24 aircraft. According to Natural Resources Defense Council it has served as a nuclear bomber base. A United States joint military inspection was conducted at the base on February 11, 1992, which confirmed a Su-24 presence.

Jet fighter aircraft were reported at Siversky as early as 1955. During the 1960s Siversky had as many as 77 fighter jets based at the airfield while a 1967 reconnaissance mission only revealed three aircraft. By 1980 Siversky was home to a Mikoyan MiG-27M regiment.
