= Szprotawa-Wiechlice Airfield =

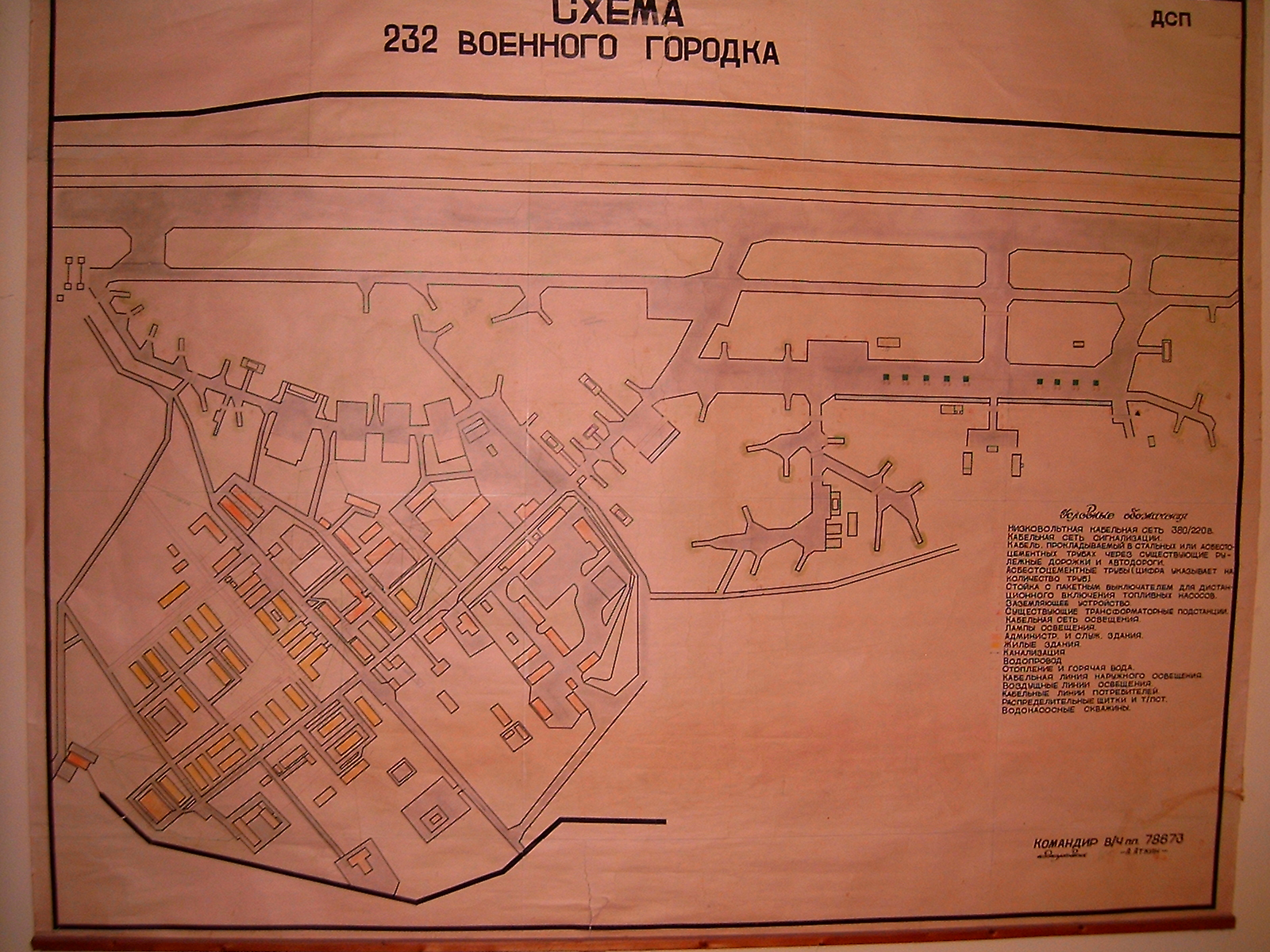
- Soviet map of the base
- IATA: none; ICAO: none

Summary
- Operator: formerly Luftwaffe; Soviet Air Force
- Location: Szprotawa, Poland
- Built: 1936
- In use: 1936-1992
- Elevation AMSL: 1,450 ft / 442 m
- Coordinates: 51.5613°N 15.5884°E

Map
- Location of airport in Lubusz Voivodeship Szprotawa-Wiechlice Airfield (Poland)

Runways
Direction	Length		Surface
Direction	ft	m	Surface
		2,000	concrete
- Disused

Szprotawa-Wiechlice Airfield is an airfield near the town of Szprotawa in Lubusz Voivodeship, Poland. The airfield was built as Fliegerhorst Sprottau for the Luftwaffe, and was used by the Soviet Union during the Cold War. After an aviation association was formed in 2008 to reinvigorate the airfield, it was registered as a civil landing site in 2017.

== History ==
=== 1936–1945 ===
The base was built in on the eastern outskirts of Sprottau, on the site of a former artillery training ground and a prisoner-of-war camp. The base was inaugurated on 1 October 1936. The runway had a concrete surface with paved taxiways. The base had one very large flight hangar, one very large repair hangar, one large hangar and three medium hangars. The base was primarily a training field for twin-engine aircraft. Ergänzungs-Jagdgeschwader 2 was formed at the base in November 1944.

=== 1945–1992 ===
After World War II, the airport was taken over by Red Army units. The base was significantly enlarged with blocks of flats for soldiers' families, public facilities, aircraft garages, new ballistic warehouses and a special facility with a nuclear bunker.

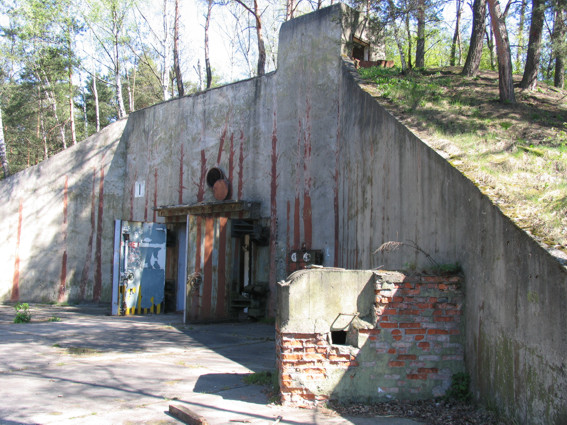
Nuclear bunker at the base

The Soviet Air Force 18th Fight-Bomber Aviation Regiment (later renamed the 89th Fighter-Bomber Aviation Regiment) equipped with MiG-17s, Su-17s, then Su-24s was based here from May 1955 until July 1992. Soviet forces withdrew from the base in July 1992.

=== Since 1992 ===
With the withdrawal of Soviet troops from Poland, the airport was transformed into a housing estate and an industrial zone.

In 2008, the Szprotawa Aviation Association was founded. It was headed by entrepreneur Zbigniew Czmuda. The association leased the eastern part of the runway from the commune. The airport was formally registered with the Civil Aviation Office as a place adapted for take-offs and landings of light sports aircraft.

As of June 10, 2024, the airfield is listed as entry 335 (of 536) in the register of Polish Civil Aviation Authority civilian landing sites. It was registered in 2017.
