= Gigant, Vladimir Oblast =

Gigant Гигант
- Settlement
- Location within Vladimir Oblast Location within Russia
- Coordinates: 56°26′N 41°17′E
- Country: Russia
- Region: Vladimir Oblast
- District: Kovrovsky District
- Time zone: UTC+3:00

Gigant (Russian: Гигант) is a rural locality (a settlement) in Malyginskoye Rural Settlement, Kovrovsky District, Vladimir Oblast, Russia. The population was 709 as of 2010. There are 6 streets.

== Geography ==
Gigant is located 14 km north of Kovrov (the district's administrative centre) by road. Kryachkovo is the nearest rural locality.
