= Sanshilipu, Shandong =

Sanshilipu 三十里铺镇
- Town
- Location in Shandong Sanshilipu (China)
- Coordinates: 36°51′07″N 116°04′44″E
- Country: People's Republic of China
- Province: Shandong
- Prefecture-level city: Liaocheng
- County: Gaotang
- Time zone: UTC+8 (China Standard)

Sanshilipu (Chinese: 三十里铺镇) is a town in Gaotang County, Liaocheng, in western Shandong province, China.
