= Piła Airfield =

Piła Airfield Port Lotniczy Piła
- IATA: none; ICAO: EPPI

Summary
- Airport type: Public
- Serves: Piła, Poland
- Coordinates: 52°58′19″N 017°01′55″E

Map
- Location of airfield in Poland

Runways
Direction	Length		Surface
Direction	m	ft	Surface
0	2,400	7,874	Concrete

Statistics (2007 +/- change from 2006)
- Passengers: 0
- Cargo (in tons): 0
- Takeoffs/Landings: 0
- Source: Polish AIP at EUROCONTROL

Piła Airfield opened in 1913 in the town of Piła, in the rather sparsely populated part of northern Wielkopolska, Poland. It possesses a former military airport (runway size: 2400.5 x 60 meters) within the city limits, which does not serve any scheduled traffic. It was proposed to use the airport for commercial purposes, and the town authorities sent invitations to airlines asking whether they would be eager to operate on it. However, the interested airlines did not convince the authorities to turn it into a normal commercial airport. That might be due to the demographic limitations—the population in the catchment area is not larger than 1.5 million. In 2006, it was agreed to reopen the airport; however, no change occurred.

As of 2023, the aerodrome hosts recreational flying of various kinds, and the occasional non-aviation event.
