= Air army =

Air army is a term used in several countries, notably France, as the equivalent term to air force. In Russia, an air army is a major command within the Russian Air Force.

Historically, a Japanese or Soviet air army was a large military formation, comprising several corps or divisions, in the aviation forces of the Soviet Union and the Japanese Empire before and during Second World War. In the Soviet Union, the term remained in use after the war. Throughout most of the Pacific War, the Imperial Japanese Army Air Service was organized into four Air Armies, with two more added in the final stages of the war.
