= Salsky District =

Salsky District Сальский район (Russian)
- District
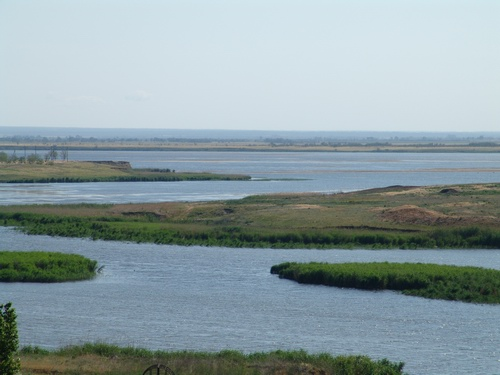
- Landscape in Salsky District

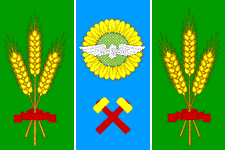
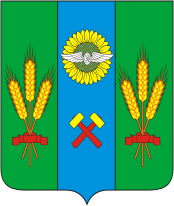
- Flag Coat of arms
- Location of Salsky District in Rostov Oblast
- Coordinates: 46°29′N 41°32′E
- Country: Russia
- Federal subject: Rostov Oblast
- Established: 1924
- Administrative center: Salsk

Area
  - Total: 3,499 km^{2} (1,351 sq mi)

Population (2010 Census)
  - Total: 107,795
  - Density: 30.81/km^{2} (79.79/sq mi)
  - Urban: 56.9%
  - Rural: 43.1%

Administrative structure
  - Administrative divisions: 1 Urban settlements, 10 Rural settlements
  - Inhabited localities: 1 cities/towns, 53 rural localities

Municipal structure
  - Municipally incorporated as: Salsky Municipal District
  - Municipal divisions: 1 urban settlements, 10 rural settlements
- Time zone: UTC+3 (MSK)
- OKTMO ID: 60650000
- Website: http://www.salsk.org/

Salsky District (Russian: Са́льский райо́н) is an administrative and municipal district (raion), one of the forty-three in Rostov Oblast, Russia. It is located in the south of the oblast. The area of the district is 3,499 square kilometers (1,351 sq mi). Its administrative center is the town of Salsk. Population: 107,795 (2010 Census); 49,343 (2002 census); 45,908 (1989 Soviet census). The population of Salsk accounts for 56.9% of the district's total population.

== Notable residents ==
- Feofan Parkhomenko (1893–1962), Soviet Army lieutenant general, born in the village of Yekaterinovka
- Stepan Rybalchenko (1903–1986), Soviet military officer, born in the settlement of Novoyegorylskoye
