= Ivan Kabitsin =

Ivan Ivanovich Kabitsin
- Иван Иванович Кабицин
- Born: September 14, 1902; Vyrytovo, Kasimovsky Uyezd, Ryazan Governorate, Russian Empire
- Died: June 10, 1968; Kharkov
- Military career
- Allegiance: Soviet Union
- Branch: Soviet Army
- Service years: 1920–1953
- Rank: Colonel
- Unit: 47th Guards Rifle Division
- Conflicts: Russian Civil War; World War II; Battles of Rzhev; Battle of the Dnieper; Operation Bagration; Lublin-Brest Offensive; Vistula-Oder Offensive; Battle of Berlin
- Awards: Hero of the Soviet Union; Order of Lenin; Order of the Red Banner; Order of the Patriotic War, 1st class

Ivan Ivanovich Kabitsin (Russian: Иван Иванович Кабицин; 14 September 1902 – 10 June 1968) was a Soviet Army colonel and Hero of the Soviet Union.

Kabitsin fought in the Russian Civil War on the Eastern Front. He commanded a machine-gun platoon. By Operation Barbarossa, Kabitsin was a political officer of a rifle battalion in Kirov. He became a battalion commissar in a battalion of the 135th Rifle Division when that division was formed in fall 1941. He fought in the Battles of Rzhev and was sent to the Frunze Military Academy for a course for rifle regiment commanders. In September 1943, he became deputy commander of a rifle regiment in the 47th Guards Rifle Division. Kabitsin fought in the Donbass Strategic Offensive (August 1943), the Battle of the Dnieper, Nikopol–Krivoi Rog Offensive, Dnieper–Carpathian Offensive, and Operation Bagration. During the fall of 1944, he fought in the defense of the Magnuszew bridgehead and the Vistula–Oder Offensive from January 1945. For his actions in the Battle of Berlin, Kabitsin was awarded the title Hero of the Soviet Union.

After the war, Kabitsin continued to serve in the Soviet Army and retired as a colonel in 1953.

== Early life and Russian Civil War ==
Kabitsin was born in the village of Vyrytovo in the Kasimovsky Uyezd of Vladimir Governorate to a peasant family. After graduation from primary school, he worked as a carpenter. He was drafted into the Red Army in 1920. Kabitsin was sent to the Eastern Front and fought against the White Army near Irkutsk and the Transbaikal during 1920. He was a machine-gunner and then commander of a machine-gun platoon.

== Interwar ==
Between 1922 and 1929 Kabitsin was commander of a machine-gun platoon in Udmurtia. In 1925, he joined the Communist Party of the Soviet Union. He graduated from political courses in Leningrad in 1929. Kabitsin was sent to the Ural Military District and served in the commissar's office in Glazov. In 1936 he completed the Vystrel courses. After the courses, Kabitsin became the political officer of a rifle battalion in Kirov.

== World War II ==
In the fall of 1941, the 135th Rifle Division was formed in the Kirov Oblast. Kabitsin was appointed commissar of the 3rd Rifle Battalion of the 495th Rifle Regiment. The division was transported to Kolomna and in February 1942 became part of the 4th Shock Army. It then fought in the Toropets–Kholm Offensive and advanced to Velizh and Demidov. A large gap formed on the left wing of the army where it joined the neighboring 22nd Army and the 135th was sent into the gap at the end of February. For the next three months Kabitsin's battalion fought in counterattacks around the villages of Bor, Glintsevo, Vyshegory, Gudilovo and Zaleksonovka in the Belsky District, Kirov Oblast. Heavy fighting occurred at the end of March and in April, resulting in severe losses being inflicted on the division in the area of Bor and the Losmyanka River. The battalion was unable to reach Demekhi and cut the Belyi-Dukhovshchina highway in fighting against the 246th Volksgrenadier Division.

In June 1942, the division was moved to defend the Kholm-Zhirkovsky ridge northwest of Bely. At the beginning of July German troops began Operation Seydlitz. Under heavy pressure from German troops Kabitsin's battalion retreated to Pushkar and then to Yegorye. On 5 July the German troops met at Pushkar and Kabitsin's battalion was trapped in the encirclement. On 9 July Kabitsin was slightly wounded, but was able to break out at Nesterovo and then moved to Maximova Gora. In the fall of 1942, the newly reinforced 135th Division, as part of 39th Army, fought in Operation Mars. In this battle Kabitsin was officially still commissar but served as battalion commander almost from the first day. On 25 November his battalion helped break through German defenses at Molodoy Tud, and in the following days the battalion fought in the battle for the village of Urdom, north of Olenino. The German 14th Motorized Division reinforced the sector, slowing the advance. In early December, the 135th Division moved closer to Rzhev, and Kabitsin's battalion fought to capture Trushkovo and Gonchuki. The German Kampfgruppe Becker reinforced German defenses in the sector, cutting off the 28th Tank Brigade from the infantry. Kabitsin's battalion fought in the relief of the tank brigade but could not advance. In the fighting his battalion suffered casualties of about 130 killed.

In early 1943 Kabitsin was promoted to Major and sent to study at the Frunze Military Academy. He finished a course for regimental commanders in early September. Kabitsin became deputy commander of the 140th Guards Rifle Regiment of the 47th Guards Rifle Division. The division was part of the 8th Guards Army, which advanced in the second tier of the front. It fought in the Donbass Strategic Offensive (August 1943) and Zaporizhia Offensive. At the end of September the division reached Zaporizhia but Kabitsin's regiment could not quickly suppress German artillery defenses. Kabitsin and the regimental commander formed assault groups and scouts identified the artillery positions. The attack began on 10 October and Kabitsin's regiment broke through the defenses from the east and began street fighting operations. By 14 October the city had been completely cleared. In January and February 1944 the division fought in the Nikopol–Krivoi Rog Offensive. On 31 January his regiment broke through German defenses in Tomakivka Raion and on 4 February helped capture Apostolove. For its actions during the offensive the division was awarded the honorific "Lower Dnieper". The division then fought in the Bereznegovatoye-Snigirevka Offensive in March. On 8 March the division captured Bashtanka and then participated in the Odessa Offensive. On 10 April, Kabitsin's regiment fought in the capture of the city and then moved into the Dniester estuary, after which the 8th Guards Army was sent into reserve and transferred to the 1st Belorussian Front.

The army was redeployed to the Kovel area for the next two months. There, Kabitsin became a lieutenant colonel and took command of the regiment. On 17 May his jeep was ambushed by partisans of the Organization of Ukrainian Nationalists. Kabitsin's driver was killed and Kabitsin was slightly wounded but Kabitsin, a signalman and one of his battalion commanders were rescued by motorized infantry. On 18 July, the Lublin–Brest Offensive began. The regiment broke through German defenses in the area of the villages of Ruda and Pelyukh and by 19 July had cleared Liuboml with the division. On 20 July advanced units of the regiment crossed the Western Bug south of Opalin. On 23 July battalions of the regiment helped capture Lublin. On 1 August the division reached the Vistula and began fighting for Grzybów, Kozienice County. On the next day the division crossed the Vistula into the Magnuszew bridgehead.From August to early September the division fought to defend the bridgehead. From 5 August Kabitsin's regiment defended in the area of Michalow, facing repeated counterattacks from the 19th Panzer Division. On 9 August the regiment captured Grabnovolya and on 15 August Brontin and Malenchin. The regiment later fought in the area of Emilyuv, Michalow and Gmina Głowaczów. From 14 January 1945 the 140th Guards Rifle Regiment fought in the Vistula–Oder Offensive and on 19 January helped capture Łódź. It helped storm Poznań on 23 January and on 29 January crossed the Oder south of Kustrin. For his leadership Kabitsin was awarded the Order of the Red Banner on 31 January. During February and March the regiment fought to hold the bridgehead. Kabitsin received a second Order of the Red Banner on 21 February. On 12 March the division helped capture Kustrin and on 23 March the 140th Regiment overcame German resistance at Gorgast.

The Berlin Offensive was launched on 16 April. The regiment was unable to capture the Seelow Heights. On the night of 18 April, the 140th attacked with Kabitsin reportedly leading and after four hours broke through the defense. The regiment repulsed twelve counterattacks during the following day and at the end of the day launched a tank-supported counterattack, dislodging German troops from two lines of trenches. In this battle, Kabitsin was wounded but reportedly continued to lead. In the subsequent days the 140th reached Karlshorst and on 22 April advanced into Berlin itself. Kabitsin reportedly personally crossed the Spree with the 1st Battalion, capturing nearby houses and assisting in the crossing of the division. The regiment reached the Tiergarten in the last days of April. Between 16 April and 8 May, the regiment reportedly destroyed eleven tanks and self-propelled guns, 4 half-tracks, 5 batteries and 115 heavy machine-guns. They also reportedly killed more than 900 German soldiers and captured 206. On 6 November 1945, he was awarded the Order of Lenin. For his actions, Kabitsin was awarded the title Hero of the Soviet Union and the Order of Lenin on 15 May 1946. For organizing street-fighting operations he received the Order of the Patriotic War, 1st class on 7 May 1945.

== Postwar ==
Until 1949, Kabitsin continued to serve with the division at Hillersleben and then with the 27th Separate Reserve Officer Regiment. In 1949 he returned to the Soviet Union and graduated from the Vystrel courses, after which he served in staff positions at Tula and Kharkov. On 15 November 1950 he received a third Order of the Red Banner. Kabitsin retired in 1953 as a colonel and lived in Kharkov. He died on 10 June 1968 and was buried in the city.
