= 79th Guards Rifle Division =

79th Guards Rifle Division (1943–1945); 20th Guards Mechanized Division (1945–1957); 27th Guards Tank Division (1957–1965); 79th Guards Tank Division (1965–1992)
- Active: 1943–1992
- Country: Soviet Union
- Branch: Red Army (Soviet Army from 1946)
- Type: Division
- Role: Infantry, Mechanized Infantry, Tank
- Part of: 8th Guards Army
- Garrison/HQ: Jena (1945–1992)
- Engagements: Lvov–Sandomierz Offensive; Battle of Berlin
- Decorations: Order of Lenin; Order of the Red Banner; Order of Suvorov 2nd class; Order of Bogdan Khmelnitsky 2nd class
- Battle honours: Zaporozhye

Commanders
- Notable commanders: Nikolay Batyuk; Leonid Vagin

The 79th Guards Rifle Division (Russian: 79-я гвардейская стрелковая дивизия) was an infantry division of the Red Army during World War II.

It was created on 1 March 1943 from the remnants of the 284th Rifle Division, in recognition of that division's stalwart defense against the German Sixth Army in the Battle of Stalingrad, in particular the Mamayev Kurgan hill and parts of the city's center. The 79th Guards continued a record of distinguished service through the rest of the Great Patriotic War, and continued to serve postwar, in several roles, until being finally disbanded in 1992.

It became the 20th Guards Mechanized Division in 1945, 27th Guards Tank Division in 1957, and the 79th Guards Tank Division in 1965. It served with the 8th Guards Army from 1943 until it was disbanded.

== World War II ==
=== Formation ===
The 79th Guards was one of several Guards rifle divisions created on 1 March 1943 in the aftermath of the fighting for Stalingrad. It was formed from the remnants of the 284th Rifle Division, in recognition of that division's stalwart defense against the German 6th Army in the Battle of Stalingrad, in particular the Mamayev Kurgan hill and parts of the city's center; it inherited the Order of the Red Banner that the 284th received for these actions on 8 February. When formed, its major units included the:

- 216th Guards Rifle Regiment from 1043rd Rifle Regiment
- 220th Guards Rifle Regiment from 1045th Rifle Regiment
- 227th Guards Rifle Regiment from 1047th Rifle Regiment
- 172nd Guards Artillery Regiment from 820th Artillery Regiment.
- 588th Medical Battalion from 338th Separate Medical Battalion
- 83rd Separate Guards Anti-Tank Battalion from 334th Separate Anti-Tank Battalion
- 80th Separate Guards Reconnaissance Company from 353rd Separate Reconnaissance Company
- 88th Separate Guards Engineer Battalion from 589th Separate Engineer Battalion
- 185th Separate Communications Company from 754th Separate Communications Battalion
- 81st Guards Chemical Defense Company from 387th Separate Chemical Defense Company
- 732nd Motor Transport Company from 724th Motor Transport Company
- 663rd Field Bakery from 430th Field Bakery
- 681st Veterinary Hospital from 895th Veterinary Hospital
- 1691st Field Postal Station from 1691st Field Postal Station
- 1116th Field Cash Office from 614rh Field Cash Office

The 284th Rifle Division's commander, Nikolay Batyuk, continued in command, being promoted to the rank of Major General on the day of the division's redesignation as well. The 62nd Army was renamed as the 8th Guards Army on 16 April, and the 79th Guards remained in the latter, in 28th Guards Rifle Corps, for the duration of the war.

=== Advance across Ukraine ===
Transferred to the Southwestern Front with the army, the division crossed the Seversky Donets on 18 June near the village of Prishib, capturing a bridgehead, which it fought to retain and expand for the next several weeks. The army fought in the Izyum-Barvenkovo Offensive in July, during which the division fought in fierce fighting on the Izyum bridgehead in the Donbas during the Donbas Strategic Offensive. Batyuk died of illness on 28 July, and was replaced by Colonel Leonid Vagin, who was promoted to Major General on 17 November. After the capture of Barvenkovo on 10 September, the 79th Guards subsequently fought in the Battle of the Dnieper, advancing towards Zaporizhia. For its actions in the recapture of Zaporozhe on 14 October during the latter, the division received the name of the city as an honorific:

"ZAPOROZHE"...79th Guards Rifle Division (Colonel Vagin, Leonid Ivanovich)... the troops who participated in the battles with the enemy, and the liberation of Zaporozhe, by the order of the Supreme High Command of 14 October 1943, and a commendation in Moscow, are given a salute of 20 artillery salvos from 224 guns.

After crossing the Dnieper on 25 October south of Voyskovoye and for the next four months fought towards Nikopol in the attempts to recapture the far southern portion of Right-bank Ukraine as part of the 3rd Ukrainian Front (formed from the Southwestern Front on 20 October). On 3 March, on the line of Shyroke, south of Krivoy Rog, during the Bereznegovatoye–Snigirevka Offensive, the division broke through German defenses on the western bank of the Inhulets River and participated in the recapture of Novy Bug. For its "exemplary performance of combat missions" in these actions, the division received the Order of Suvorov, 2nd class, on 19 March. During the Odessa Offensive the 79th Guards fought in the recapture of Odessa on 10 April. For their "courage and fighting skill" the division was awarded the Order of Bogdan Khmelnitsky, 2nd class, on 20 April. After reaching the Dniester and capturing a bridgehead north of Bender, the division was withdrawn with the army to the Reserve of the Supreme High Command on 8 June.

=== Into Poland and Germany ===
With the army, the division was relocated to the Kovel region in June to join the 1st Belorussian Front, after receiving reinforcements. During the Lublin–Brest Offensive on 21 July the division crossed the Western Bug and entered Polish territory. Along with other units, it participated in the capture of Lublin on 24 July. It then crossed the Vistula near Skórecka, six kilometers northeast of Magnuszew. Among the first units of the river to cross were the division reconnaissance company and the 1st Battalion of the 216th Guards Rifle Regiment under the command of Captain Yefim Tsitovsky, who was made a Hero of the Soviet Union. The bridgehead was subjected to repeated German counterattacks for the next ten days, particularly on 8 August, for actions on which company commander Lieutenant Vladimir Burba and Private Pyotr Khlyustin of the 220th Guards Rifle Regiment were posthumously made Heroes of the Soviet Union. For their actions in the bridgehead, ten soldiers of the division received the award.

After continued actions on the Magnuszew bridgehead, the division fought in the Warsaw–Poznan Offensive from mid-January 1945, fighting near Łódź, Pinne, and Skwierzyna and seizing a bridgehead across the Oder on the left bank of the river south of Kustrin at Reitwein on 3 February. Vagin was severely wounded during the latter action and evacuated to the hospital; he would later be made a Hero of the Soviet Union for his leadership of the division. The division came under the temporary command of 47th Guards Rifle Division deputy commander Colonel Ivan Semchenkov between 6 February and 14 March as it fought to retain the Kustrin bridgehead. Semchenkov was replaced by Colonel Stepan Gerasimenko, who had just graduated from an accelerated course at the Higher Military Academy.

After overcoming fierce German resistance in the Battle of the Seelow Heights, the division approached the city on 23 April. Gerasimenko was relieved of command on the next day for losing control of his troops; he was replaced by Major General Dmitry Stankevsky, the 79th Guards' last wartime commander. The army's final assault began two days later, with the division, backed by the 39th Guards, ordered to surround and capture Tempelhof Airfield, where it was suspected many German aircraft were hiding in underground hangars to fly out the Nazi leadership. After an assault crossing of the Teltow Canal the two divisions took the airfield and prevented out-going flights. Early on 2 May the 79th intercepted a radio transmission in Russian:

Hello, hello! This is the 56th German Panzer Corps. We ask you to cease fire. At 12:50hrs our emissaries will be at the Potsdam Bridge. Identification: a white flag. Waiting for your reply.

The message was authorized by Helmuth Weidling, commander of the Berlin garrison, and led to the German surrender to Chuikov later that day, ending the war for the 79th Guards. For "exemplary performance of command tasks" in the Battle of Berlin, the division received the Order of Lenin on 28 May. In addition to nineteen Heroes of the Soviet Union, 11,000 soldiers of the division were decorated for their action during the war.

== Postwar ==
Vagin returned from the hospital to command the 79th Guards in July 1945, and in October of that year they were redesignated as the 20th Guards Mechanized Division at Jena, serving with the 8th Guards Army in the Group of Soviet Occupation Forces in Germany (the Group of Soviet Forces in Germany from 1954); the division remained at Jena for the duration of the Cold War. Vagin commanded the division until he was transferred in February 1948. In July 1956 the division became directly subordinated to 8th Guards Army, after the 28th Guards Rifle Corps was disbanded. On 17 May 1957 it became the 27th Guards Tank Division. On 11 January 1965 it became the 79th Guards Tank Division, restoring its World War II numbering. The division remained at Jena until July 1992, when it was withdrawn to Samarkand in the Turkestan Military District. It was quickly disbanded after arrival there.

One of the first units to disband, in March 1992, was the 45th Guards Tank Regiment. On February 23, a solemn farewell to the banner of the unit took place in Weimar.
