= 3rd Guards Anti-Aircraft Artillery Division =

16th Anti-Aircraft Artillery Division (10 November 1942–29 September 1943) 3rd Guards Anti-Aircraft Artillery Division (29 September 1943–20 March 1958) 144th Guards Anti-Aircraft Artillery Brigade (20 March 1958–1961) 196th Guards Anti-Aircraft Rocket Regiment (1961–1968) 204th Guards Anti-Aircraft Rocket Brigade (1968–1994) 1491st Guards Anti-Aircraft Rocket Regiment (1994–1998) 1489th Guards Anti-Aircraft Rocket Regiment (1998–present)
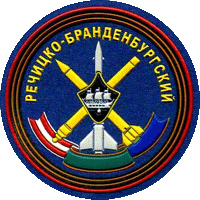
- Insignia of the 1489th Guards Anti-Aircraft Rocket Regiment
- Active: November 1942 – present
- Country: Soviet Union; Russia
- Branch: Red Army (Soviet Army from 1946); Soviet Air Defense Forces; Russian Air Force; Russian Aerospace Forces
- Type: Anti-Aircraft Artillery (Surface-to-air missile unit from 1961)
- Garrison/HQ: Vaganovo
- Engagements: World War II
- Decorations: Order of the Red Banner; Order of Kutuzov, 2nd class; Order of Suvorov, 2nd class
- Battle honours: Rechitsa; Brandenburg

Commanders
- Notable commanders: Innokenty Seredin

The 3rd Guards Anti-Aircraft Artillery Division (Russian: 3-я гвардейская зенитная артиллерийская дивизия) was an anti-aircraft artillery division of the Soviet Union's Red Army during World War II and the Soviet Army during the early years of the Cold War.

Formed in November 1942 as the 16th Anti-Aircraft Artillery Division, it fought in the Battle of Kursk and became a Guards unit in September 1943. The 3rd Guards fought in the Gomel–Rechitsa Offensive, Operation Bagration, the Vistula–Oder Offensive, and the Battle of Berlin. It was awarded the honorifics Rechitsa and Brandenburg and the Order of the Red Banner, Order of Suvorov 2nd class, and the Order of Kutuzov 2nd class. Postwar, it remained in East Germany with the 3rd Army and became the 144th Guards Anti-Aircraft Artillery Brigade in 1958. The brigade was withdrawn to the Leningrad Military District in 1961, where it became the surface-to-air missile-armed 196th Guards Anti-Aircraft Rocket Regiment and then the 204th Guards Anti-Aircraft Rocket Brigade of the Soviet Air Defence Forces. In 1994 it was reorganized as the 1491st Guards Anti-Aircraft Rocket Regiment, and four years later it was disbanded with its lineage transferred to a unit that became the 1489th Guards Anti-Aircraft Rocket Regiment.

== World War II ==
The 16th Anti-Aircraft Artillery Division RVGK was formed in November 1942 at Yefremov on the Bryansk Front with the 728th, 1283rd, 1285th, and 1286th Air Defense Regiments. Its regiments were previously independent regiments of the Bryansk Front. On 10 November, Colonel Innokenty Seredin was assigned as division commander; he commanded it for the rest of the war and was promoted to Major General on 7 August 1943. In mid-January it joined the 13th Army, but was transferred to the 48th Army on 31 January. The 16th fought in the Voronezh-Kastornensk operation in January and February and then the Maloarkhangelsk (Orel) Offensive in February. In April its Air Defense Regiments were redesignated as Anti-Aircraft Artillery Regiments.

At the beginning of the Battle of Kursk, in cooperation with fighters from the 16th Air Army of the Central Front, the division provided air defense for the 48th Army's left flank. After Operation Citadel, the German attack, ended, the Soviet troops went on the offensive in Operation Kutuzov. The 16th transferred to the 13th Army, which launched the attack on 15 July. On 21 July the division was transferred to the 70th Army to assist the breakthrough of the German defenses and the attack on Oryol. The division covered the left flank of the army during the attack, but the army failed to achieve a breakthrough due to stubborn German resistance. In July, twenty soldiers of the division were killed and 73 wounded. It was transferred to the 3rd Guards Tank Army on 3 August. In 24 days of active fighting at Kursk, the division claimed 130 enemy aircraft. The 16th became part of the 60th Army after the operation ended on 12 August and served with it in the Battle of the Dnieper. For its "skill in combat, courage, and heroism", the division was made an elite guards unit, the 3rd Guards Anti-Aircraft Artillery Division, on 29 September.

In October, it covered 65th Army during its crossing of the Dnieper and capture and expansion of a bridgehead on the right bank near Loyew. Its regiments became the 297th, 307th, 308th, and 309th Guards Anti-Aircraft Artillery Regiments by 1 November. The army then fought in the Gomel–Rechitsa Offensive in November, and for its actions in the capture of Rechitsa by the 48th and 65th Armies the 3rd Guards received the honorific Rechitsa on 18 November. From 24 February to 20 June 1944, directly subordinate to the 1st Belorussian Front, it covered positions in the front and rear. In the summer, the division fought in Operation Bagration, the Soviet advance through Belarus and into eastern Poland. During the operation, the 3rd Guards, in cooperation with other anti-aircraft artillery units and the fighters of the 16th Air Army, provided air defense for the 65th Army in its breakthrough of the German lines in the Bobruysk Offensive, the advance on Baranovichi, and the continued pursuit of retreating German forces. On 30 June, during the Bobruysk Offensive, in which a large group of German troops were trapped in a pocket around the city, the infantry protecting the 297th Guards Regiment's 4th Battery suffered heavy losses to German artillery fire and infantry attacks. According to Soviet reports, Battery telephone operator Yefreytor Mikhail Abrosimov led his unit in repulsing the infantry attack but was killed in the pursuit. He was posthumously made a Hero of the Soviet Union.

From August 1944 to the end of the war, the division was part of the 8th Guards Army. The 3rd Guards covered the army in the Tarnow, Wygoda, and Ostrow area of the Magnuszew bridgehead and the crossing of the Vistula. It repulsed German airstrikes during the Warsaw–Poznan Offensive of the Vistula–Oder Strategic Offensive and the fighting for the Kustrin bridgehead. For "exemplary fulfillment of command tasks", the division was awarded the Order of the Red Banner and the Order of Suvorov, 2nd class, on 19 February, and for distinguishing itself in battles in Brandenburg it received the Brandenburg honorific on 5 April. The division's last combat operation of the war was the Berlin Offensive, which began in mid-April. For its actions, the 3rd Guards was awarded the Order of Kutuzov, 2nd class on 11 June. From 1943 to the end of the war, the division claimed over 500 enemy aircraft. Around 700 of its soldiers received decorations during the war.

== Postwar ==
After the end of the war, the division served with the Group of Soviet Forces in Germany with the 3rd Army. It was based at Magdeburg and on 20 March 1958 was reorganized into the 144th Guards Anti-Aircraft Artillery Brigade. In 1961, the brigade was withdrawn to the Leningrad Military District, stationed in eastern Estonia at Narva and Kohtla-Järve. There, it became the 196th Guards Anti-Aircraft Rocket Regiment at Kyorstovo near Kingisepp, armed with new S-125 surface-to-air missiles. In June 1968, it was expanded into the 204th Guards Anti-Aircraft Rocket Brigade of the Soviet Air Defence Forces, including six S-125 battalions and four S-75 battalions. The brigade was part of the 18th Air Defense Corps of the 6th Air Defense Army. One of its S-75 battalions was disbanded between 1969 and 1970, and between 1970 and 1971 a separate group of the brigade with three S-200V battalions was stationed near Lake Sudachye, one of the first units equipped with the S-200V. In 1970, an S-75 battalion from the brigade under the command of Lieutenant Colonel Nikolay Kutyntsev was deployed to provide air defense for Egypt during the War of Attrition, part of the 18th Special Anti-Aircraft Rocket Division, under Operation Kavkaz. Kutyntsev was awarded the title Hero of the Soviet Union in recognition of his battalion being credited with downing an Israeli F-4 Phantom. In the 1970s and 1980s, the brigade included twelve battalions: three equipped with the S-200V, three with the S-75, and six with the S-125. In March 1986, it transferred to the 54th Air Defense Corps. On 28 May 1987, the forces of the corps were alerted when Mathias Rust's aircraft appeared on Soviet radar. The commanders of three battalions from the brigade reported that they were tracking the aircraft and were ready to launch missiles, but they were not given permission to fire, and Rust slipped through the air defense system.

The brigade was not rearmed with newer missiles in the late 1980s, and in 1994 it was reorganized into the 1491st Guards Anti-Aircraft Rocket Regiment. In 1998, its lineage was transferred after disbandment to the 1489th Anti-Aircraft Rocket Regiment (the former 84th Anti-Aircraft Rocket Brigade) at Vaganovo. This unit, at Vagonovo-2 near Vsevolozhsk, became the 1489th Guards Anti-Aircraft Rocket Regiment (Military Unit Number 28034). Two battalions from the 1491st remained in Kyorstovo, becoming part of the 500th Guards Anti-Aircraft Rocket Regiment. In 2008, these battalions were reported by Kommersant as the 196th Guards Anti-Aircraft Rocket Regiment at Kingisepp with the 54th Air Defense Corps, equipped with the S-300P. In 2009, the 1489th Guards became part of the 2nd Air Defense Brigade. In 2015 it became part of the 2nd Air Defense Division of the 6th Air and Air Defence Forces Army.
