= 449th Rocket Brigade =

- Active: 1986–1998
- Country: Soviet Union (1986–1992); Russia (1992–1998)
- Branch: Soviet Army (1986–1992); Russian Ground Forces (1992–1998)
- Type: Tactical Ballistic Missile Brigade
- Garrison/HQ: Yasnaya

The 449th Rocket Brigade was a Tactical ballistic missile brigade of the Soviet Army and Russian Ground Forces from 1986 to 1998. The brigade was activated with the Group of Soviet Forces in Germany's 8th Guards Army. After the Soviet withdrawal from Germany it moved to Yasnaya in Chita Oblast and was disbanded in 1998.

== History ==
The 449th Missile Brigade was activated in 1986 at Arnstadt, part of the 8th Guards Army. It included the 324th, 345th and 1563rd Separate Missile Battalions and a technical battery. The 324th had been transferred from the 27th Guards Motor Rifle Division, the 345th from the 79th Guards Tank Division and the 1563rd from the 39th Guards Motor Rifle Division. The brigade was equipped with OTR-21 Tochka missiles. After Soviet forces left Germany, the brigade moved to Yasnaya in Chita Oblast in June 1992. It became part of the 55th Army Corps. In 1997, the brigade transferred to control of the 36th Army and was disbanded in 1998.
