= Basinów =

Basinów refers to the following places in Poland:

- Basinów, Kozienice County
- Basinów, Wyszków County
