= Chmielew =

Chmielew may refer to the following places:

- Chmielew, Kozienice County in Masovian Voivodeship (east-central Poland)
- Chmielew, Mińsk County in Masovian Voivodeship (east-central Poland)
- Chmielew, Sokołów County in Masovian Voivodeship (east-central Poland)
- Chmielew, Węgrów County in Masovian Voivodeship (east-central Poland)
