= 193rd Tank Division =

Tank division of the Soviet military

193rd Rifle Division (14 March 1941 – 27 Dec. 1941) 193rd Rifle Division (3 Jan. 1942 – 1945) 22nd Mechanised Division (c. 1945 – 1957) 36th Tank Division (1957–1965) 193rd Tank Division (1965–1991) 193rd(?) Base for Storage of Weapons and Equipment (1991–disbandment)
- Active: 1941–1990s
- Country: Soviet Union, Belarus
- Branch: Red Army, Soviet Army
- Type: Infantry
- Role: Armored infantry
- Size: Division
- Garrison/HQ: Bobruysk (post World War II)
- Engagements: Operation Barbarossa; Battle of Stalingrad; Battle of Kursk; Lower Dnieper Offensive; Operation Bagration; Lublin-Brest Offensive; East Pomeranian Offensive; Berlin Strategic Offensive

Commanders
- Notable commanders: Col. A. K. Berestov; Col. F. N. Smekhotvorov; Mjr. Gen. A. G. Frolenkov

The 193rd Tank Division was originally a Red Army infantry division that was reorganised after World War II as a mechanised and then a tank division of the Soviet Army.

== 1st Formation ==
The original 193rd Rifle Division was established in the Kharkov Military District on March 14, 1941. By June 22 it was still forming near Kamenka in the Kiev Military District and its order of battle was as follows:

- 685th Rifle Regiment
- 883rd Rifle Regiment
- 895th Rifle Regiment
- 384th Light Artillery Regiment
- 393rd Howitzer Regiment
- 50th Antitank Battalion
- 4th Sapper Battalion

The division, commanded by Colonel A.K. Berestov, joined with the 195th and 200th Rifle Divisions to form the 31st Rifle Corps. At the onset of the German invasion this corps was under direct command of the Kiev Special Military District, soon renamed Southwestern Front, and was positioned in the second echelon southeast of Sarny. On June 28 the Corps was assigned to 5th Army and the 193rd went into battle at Rozhits and Kivertsy. By July 8 it was down to 3,500 men and less than 35 guns and mortars of all types. On August 19, as 5th Army began its retreat, the division had only 600 men remaining; the following week it took in reservists and volunteers to a total of 4,500 men, but was almost completely lacking heavy weapons. In September the 193rd was surrounded with 5th Army in the Kiev Pocket and destroyed. The division's number was officially stricken from the Soviet order of battle on Dec. 27.

== 2nd Formation ==
The division was reformed at Sorochinsk, in the South Urals Military District, from December 1941 to 3 January 1942. It comprised:

- 685th Rifle Regiment
- 883rd Rifle Regiment
- 895th Rifle Regiment
- 384th Artillery Regiment
- 50th Antitank Battalion
- 4th Sapper Battalion
- 320th Reconnaissance Company.

In June the division went to the Voronezh Front reserves, but was still far from complete at that time.

=== Stalingrad ===
On 17 September the division, commanded by Col. F. N. Smekhotvorov, was assigned to the 62nd Army and fought during the Battle of Stalingrad. On 22 Sept., the 685th Regiment was ferried from the east to the west bank of the Volga into central Stalingrad and five nights later, on the 27th, the other two regiments joined it. The 883rd and 895th were deployed in the Red October factory complex. The following day, the 883rd was attacked by German tanks. Anti-tank rifleman Mikhail Panikakha was attempting to defend his position with Molotov cocktails. A German bullet ignited one of his bombs, setting him alight. He then threw himself against a tank with his remaining bomb and destroyed it, at the cost of his own life. Panikakha was posthumously made a Hero of the Soviet Union in 1990.

The division was mauled and pushed back in a fierce German attack on 1 Oct. A day later, it was defending the western part of the Red October Factory, which included the kitchens, the bath house and workers' flats; it also counter-attacked Hill 107.5. The regiments, down to 200 men, were unequal to the task and were pushed back by German tanks and infantry. Chuikov, writing in 1963, said that between 13 and 20 Nov. the survivors of the 193rd Rifle Division (Smekhotvorov) were consolidated into the 685th Rifle Regiment - the grand total was 250 soldiers. However the historian John Erickson says that by 11 Nov. the division was reduced to 1,000 personnel.

At 2300 hrs. on November 12, Col. Smekhotvorov received orders from Maj. Gen. N.I. Krylov, chief-of-staff of 62nd Army, to withdraw his divisional headquarters and those of its subordinate regiments to the east bank of the Volga. The composite regiment was subordinated to the 138th Rifle Division, and the divisional artillery likewise to the chief of 62nd Army's artillery. This order officially ended the division's participation in the battle.

=== Kursk ===
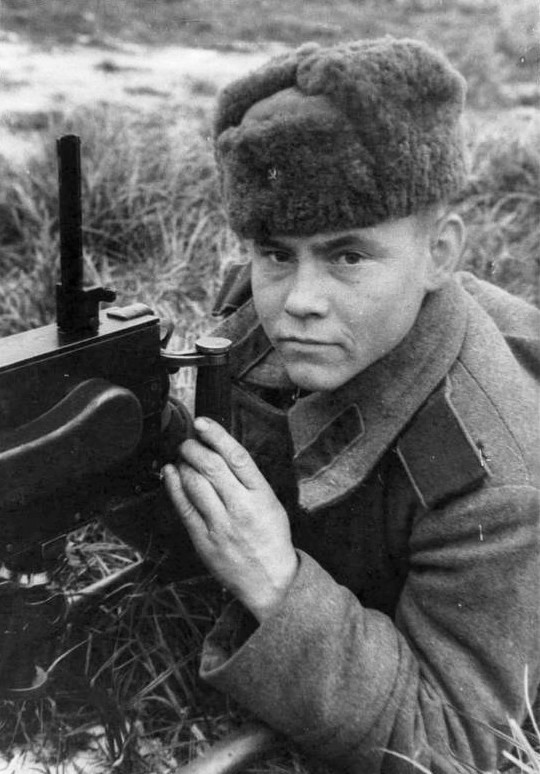
Squad leader Vasily Matasov of the 883rd Rifle Regiment, made a Hero of the Soviet Union for his bravery during the crossing of the Dnieper

The rebuilding division was assigned to the 65th Army (former 4th Tank Army) in February 1943; it was under the command of Lieutenant General Pavel Batov, part of Colonel General K. K. Rokossovski's Central Front. The 193rd would remain under these commanders for the duration of the war. The Front was redeployed to the Kursk area, where the division, now with a strength of 9,000 troops, made gains in a gap between the German 2nd Army and 2nd Panzer Army until German reserves brought the advance to a halt. The 193rd remained in the Kursk salient through the following months, including Operation Zitadelle. At this time the division was part of the 27th Rifle Corps, and was commanded by Major General F. N. Zhobrev. Zhobrev was replaced by Colonel A. G. Frolenkov on Aug. 28. Frolenkov was eventually promoted to Maj. Gen. and named a Hero of the Soviet Union; he remained in command for the rest of the war.

After the German defeat at Kursk, the Red Army launched its first summer offensive. The 193rd staged a successful assault crossing of the Dnepr River on October 15, with divisional and army artillery firing 1,000 shells per minute in support. For this action the division was awarded the honorific title Dnepr. In February 1944 the division received 1,700 replacements from the 218th Reserve Rifle Regiment, but remained well understrength for some time. The 193rd was joined with the 354th Rifle Division in April to form the 105th Rifle Corps, commanded by General D. F. Alekseev, where it would remain for the duration of the war.

== Advance ==
As part of Rokossovski's 1st Belorussian Front, the 193rd took part in Operation Bagration, also known as the Destruction of Army Group Centre. The 193rd assisted the 354th in liberating the city of Bobruisk from the German 9th Army on 29 June 1944, and on 8 July was credited with liberating the city of Baranovichi. Racing ahead, forward detachments of the division penetrated the Bialowiecz Forest, and onwards to the Western Bug River where it was temporarily halted in late July by counterattacks by the 5th SS Panzer Division (Wiking). Continuing to advance, the depleted 65th Army managed to carve out a bridgehead over the Narev River, north of Warsaw between Serotsk and Pultusk, on 5 September. This bridgehead was subjected to a major surprise counterattack by German forces on 5 October, but the 193rd was successful in helping to narrowly hold it.

During the next three months the division was brought up to strength again, and on 14 January 1945 participated in the massive breakout of the now-renumbered 2nd Belorussian Front from the bridgehead. The 193rd reached the Vistula River on 26 January, and participated in the liberation of Danzig (Gdańsk) at the end of March. In a final series of operations, the division advanced to the Oder River and helped stage an assault crossing beginning on 20 April near Stettin. The city officials surrendered to the 193rd at dawn on 26 April.

Division honorifics were - Russian: Днепровская краснознаменная, орденов Ленина, Суворова, Кутузова. (English: Dnepr, Red Banner, Order of Lenin, Order of Suvorov, Order of Kutuzov.)

== Cold War service ==
By 1955 the division was reflagged as the 22nd Mechanized Division, and in 1957 was reflagged again as the 36th Tank Division. The division was restored to its World War II number - the 193rd Tank Division, on 11 January 1965 4.

In 1991-2 the 193rd Tank Division incorporated the 251st, 262nd, 264th Tank, 297th Motor Rifle, 852nd Artillery (Self-propelled), 929th Anti-Aircraft Rocket Regiments, 52nd Reconnaissance Battalion, and other non-combat units.

The 193rd Tank Division was stationed at Bobruisk (Киселевичи "Бобруйск-25", Kiselevichi) in the Belorussian Military District with the 5th Guards Tank Army. In 1991 it became the 193rd Base for Storage of Weapons & Equipment (although the number needs confirmation); it came under the Armed Forces of Belarus in March 1992. It was disbanded some years later.

== Order of Battle, 1989–90 ==
- 251st Red Banner Order of Kutuzov Tank Regiment (Bobruisk): 37 Т-72; 10 BMP (8 BMP-2, 2 BMP-1К), 10 BTR-70; 2 BMP-1KS, 2 РХМ; 2 R-145 BM, 1 ПУ-12, 2 МП-31; 3 МТУ-20
- 262nd Tank Regiment (Bobruisk): 31 Т-72; 10 BMP (8 BMP-2, 2 BRM-1K), 2 BTR-70; 2 БМП-1 КШ, 2 РХМ; 3 - 1В18, 1 - 1В19; 2 Р-145 БМ, 1 ПУ-12, 2 МП-31, МТП, 3 МТУ-20
- 264th Baranovichi Red Banner Order of Suvorov Tank Regiment (Bobruisk): 31 Т-72, 10 BMP (8 БМП-2, 2 БРМ-1К), 2 BTR-70; 2 БМП-1 КШ, 2 РХМ, 2 Р-145 БМ, 1 ПУ-12, 2 МП-31, 1 МТП-1, 3 МТУ-20
- 297th Plon Orders of Suvorov and Bogdan Khmelnitsky Motor Rifle Regiment (Bobruisk): 9 Т-72; 6 BMP (4 BMP-2, 2 BRM-1K), 2 БТР-70; 2 БМП-1КШ, 2 РХМ, 4 РХМ-4, 1 ПРП-3, 2 Р-145 БМ, 2 ПУ-12, 2 МП-31, 2 МТП, 1 МТУ-20
- 852-й Self-Propelled Artillery Regiment (Bobruisk): 12 BM-21 "Grad"; 3 ПРП-3,4; 9 - 1В18, 3 -1В19; 1 БТР-70
- 929th Anti-Aircraft Rocket Regiment (Bobruisk): 7 ПУ-12, 1 Р-156 БТР
- 52nd Separate Reconnaissance Battalion (Bobruisk): 17 BMP (10 BMP-2, 7 BRM-1K), 6 БТР-70; 2 R-145 BM, 1 R-156 BTR.
- 381st Separate Signals Battalion (Bobruisk): 7 R-145 BM, 1 R-156 BTR, 1 R-137B
- 4th Separate Engineer-Sapper Battalion (Bobruisk): 2 ИРМ, 2 УР-67
- 1023rd Separate Material Maintenance Battalion
- 103rd Separate Repair Battalion

On 19 November 1990 the division was equipped with:

- 108 tanks (Т-72);
- 53 BMPs (38 BMP-2, 15 BRM-1K);
- 23 BTRs (BTR-70);
- 12 BM-21 "Grad".

== Sources ==
- Feskov, The Soviet Army during the Period of the Cold War, Tomsk, 2004
- Lenskiy
- Stalingrad
- (in Russian) samsv.narod.ru
