= 84th Anti-Aircraft Rocket Brigade =

84th Anti-Aircraft Rocket Brigade (1960–1994) 1489th Anti-Aircraft Rocket Regiment (1994–1998)
- Active: 1960–1998
- Country: Soviet Union; Russia
- Branch: Soviet Air Defense Forces; Russian Air Defense Forces
- Type: Surface-to-air missile brigade
- Role: Air defense
- Part of: 54th Air Defense Corps (1986–1998)
- Garrison/HQ: Vaganovo
- Equipment: S-75 Dvina (1960–c. 1989); S-125 (1963–c. 1994); S-300PS (c. 1989–1998)

The 84th Anti-Aircraft Rocket Brigade (Russian: 84-я зенитно-ракетная бригада; Military Unit Number 28036) was a surface-to-air missile brigade of the Soviet Air Defense Forces and briefly the Russian Air Defense Forces.

Active from 1960, the brigade provided air defense for the Leningrad area with S-75 Dvina and S-125 missiles. In 1994, after reequipping with S-300PS missiles, the brigade was reorganized as the 1489th Anti-Aircraft Rocket Regiment in 1994. It inherited the lineage of a disbanded unit to become the 1489th Guards Anti-Aircraft Rocket Regiment in 1998.

== History ==
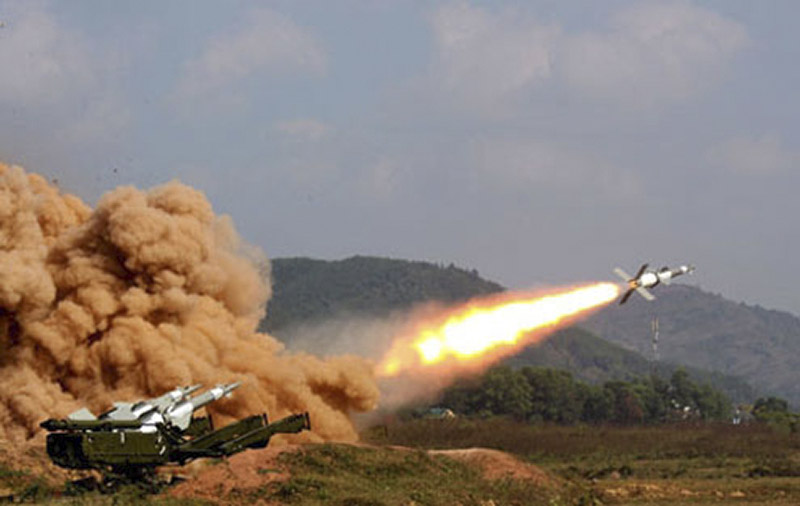
Launching of an S-125 of the type used by the brigade

The brigade was originally formed as the 84th Air Defense Brigade of Special Designation, a unit of System-100, the Leningrad air defense missile system, in accordance with a General Staff directive dated 10 September 1958. It was the second brigade of the system to be formed and was based at Vaganovo. The brigade became operational in February 1960 with eight battalions of S-75 Dvina missiles, and was redesignated the 84th Anti-Aircraft Rocket Brigade in August. Between 1963 and 1964 the brigade was reinforced with five missile battalions equipped with the S-125. In 1967, the brigade was directly subordinated to the 6th Independent Air Defense Army when the air defense missile system was abolished as an independent headquarters.

In 1986, it became part of the 54th Air Defense Corps. By 1989 the 84th had twelve missile battalions of S-75s and S-125s. In that year, it began rearming with the new S-300PS in two groups of battalions. After the replacement of the S-75s and S-125s had been completed, the brigade was reorganized as the 1489th Anti-Aircraft Rocket Regiment in the summer of 1994. In 1998, the lineage of the disbanded 1491st Guards Anti-Aircraft Rocket Regiment was transferred to the 1489th Regiment, which became the 1489th Guards Anti-Aircraft Rocket Regiment.
