= Mikhail Panikakha =

Russian Red Army soldier (1914–1942)

Mikhail Averyanovich Panikakha
- Михайло Оверянович Панікаха; Михаил Аверьянович Паникаха
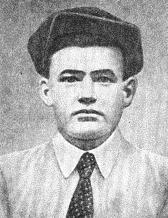
- Born: 1914; Mogilev (Ukraine), Novomoskovsk Uyezd, Ekaterinoslav Governorate, Russian Empire
- Died: 2 October 1942 (aged 27–28); Stalingrad, Soviet Union
- Military career
- Allegiance: Soviet Union
- Branch: Soviet Naval Infantry
- Service years: 1939–1942
- Rank: Private
- Unit: 193rd Rifle Division
- Conflicts: World War II; Battle of Stalingrad †
- Awards: Hero of the Soviet Union; Order of Lenin; Order of the Patriotic War 1st class

Mikhail Averyanovich Panikakha (Ukrainian: Михайло Оверянович Панікаха, Russian: Михаил Аверьянович Паникаха; 1914 – 2 October 1942) was a Red Army soldier. He was posthumously awarded the title Hero of the Soviet Union for destroying a German tank with two Molotov cocktails while on fire during the Battle of Stalingrad.

== Early life ==
Mikhail Panikakha was born in 1914 in the village of Mogilev (now Mohyliv) in Novomoskovsky Uyezd of Yekaterinoslav Governorate to a peasant family. He received primary education and worked on the farm. In 1939, he was drafted into the Red Army. Panikakha became a sailor in the Pacific Fleet.

== World War II ==
In March 1942, Panikahka volunteered for combat service and was assigned as a private to the 883rd Rifle Regiment of the 193rd Rifle Division. On 28 September, during the Battle of Stalingrad, two regiments of the division, including the 883rd, crossed the Volga River and took up positions to the west of the Red October factory. They were attacked by German troops from the 24th Panzer Division and 71st Infantry Division. On 2 October, Panikakha was helping to repel the German attacks when the German troops sent in tanks. He had already thrown his grenades and had two Molotov cocktails left. Panikakha raised the bottle in order to throw it when a bullet smashed it, setting him on fire. He then took the remaining bottle, jumped out of the trench and onto the engine deck of the nearest German tank and hit it with the cocktail. The German tank was then set on fire, causing the other tanks to withdraw due to seeing the fierceness of the Red Army attacking in spite of being on fire.

Panikakha was recommended for a Hero of the Soviet Union award by his regimental commander in November, but was not awarded the title until 5 May 1990, along with the Order of Lenin. On 9 December 1942, he was awarded the Order of the Patriotic War 1st class for his actions.

== Legacy ==
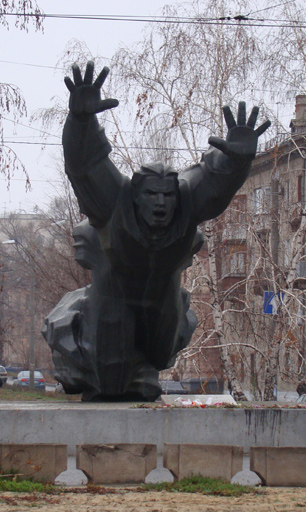
Panikakha monument in Volgograd

At the site of Panikakha's death, there is a monument, which was erected on 8 May 1975. The monument was sculptured by R.P. Kharitonov and Yu. Belosov. It is located at the intersection of the Avenue of Metallurgists and Tarachantsev Street. A street in Volgograd is named after him. His name is also inscribed on the memorial plaque at the mass grave on Mamayev Kurgan. There is a plaque in both Mohyliv village and Dnipro (formerly Dnipropetrovsk). On 16 November 2013, a monument to Panikakha in Dnipropetrovsk was unveiled.
