= Wólka Tarnowska, Masovian Voivodeship =

Wólka Tarnowska
- Village
- Location within Poland
- Coordinates: 51°47′12″N 21°22′46″E
- Country: Poland
- Voivodeship: Masovian
- County: Kozienice
- Gmina: Magnuszew
- Population: 180

Wólka Tarnowska [ˈvulka tarˈnɔfska] is a village in the administrative district of Gmina Magnuszew, within Kozienice County, Masovian Voivodeship, in east-central Poland.
