= 11th Rocket Brigade =

- Active: 1961-1991
- Country: Soviet Union
- Branch: Soviet Army
- Type: Tactical ballistic missile brigade

The 11th Rocket Brigade was a Tactical ballistic missile brigade of the Soviet Army from 1961 to 1991. The brigade was initially activated with the Baltic Military District but transferred to the Group of Soviet Forces in Germany's 8th Guards Army. In 1991, it left Germany and disbanded in the North Caucasian Military District.

== History ==
The 11th Missile Brigade was activated in 1961 in Chernyakhovsk, Kaliningrad Oblast, part of the Baltic Military District. The brigade was equipped with R-11 Zemlya (SS-1B Scud A) tactical ballistic missiles. In 1966, the brigade moved to Jena and became part of the 8th Guards Army. The brigade included the 171st, 180th and 417th Separate Missile Battalions, as well as a technical battalion. The 171st and 180th were based at Jena. The 417th was at Weißenfels and the technical battalion at Altenhain. In 1984, the brigade was reequipped with OTR-23 Oka theatre ballistic missiles. The brigade received R-17 Elbrus (SS-1C Scud B) tactical ballistic missiles in 1988. In June 1991, the brigade was withdrawn from Germany to Maykop in the North Caucasian Military District, where it was disbanded.
