= Wola Magnuszewska =

- Village
- Location within Poland
- Coordinates: 51°45′48″N 21°21′17″E
- Country: Poland
- Voivodeship: Masovian
- County: Kozienice
- Gmina: Magnuszew
- Population: 120

Wola Magnuszewska [ˈvɔla maɡnuˈʂɛfska] is a village in the administrative district of Gmina Magnuszew, within Kozienice County, Masovian Voivodeship, in east-central Poland.
