= Osiemborów =

- Village
- Location within Poland
- Coordinates: 51°46′36″N 21°19′15″E
- Country: Poland
- Voivodeship: Masovian
- County: Kozienice
- Gmina: Magnuszew
- Population: 220

Osiemborów [ɔɕɛmˈbɔruf] is a village in the administrative district of Gmina Magnuszew, within Kozienice County, Masovian Voivodeship, in east-central Poland.
