= Gmina Magnuszew =

Gmina Magnuszew Magnuszew Commune
- Gmina
- Coat of arms
- Interactive map of Gmina Magnuszew
- Coordinates (Magnuszew): 51°45′42″N 21°23′1″E
- Country: Poland
- Voivodeship: Masovian
- County: Kozienice
- Seat: Magnuszew

Area
  - Total: 140.92 km^{2} (54.41 sq mi)

Population (2006)
  - Total: 6,595
  - Density: 46.80/km^{2} (121.2/sq mi)

Gmina Magnuszew is a rural gmina (administrative district) in Kozienice County, Masovian Voivodeship, in east-central Poland. Its seat is the village of Magnuszew, which lies approximately 24 kilometres (15 mi) north-west of Kozienice and 57 km (35 mi) south-east of Warsaw.

The gmina covers an area of 140.92 square kilometres (54.4 sq mi), and as of 2006 its total population is 6,595.

== Villages ==
Gmina Magnuszew contains the villages and settlements of Aleksandrów, Anielin, Basinów, Boguszków, Bożówka, Chmielew, Dębowola, Gruszczyn, Grzybów, Kępa Skórecka, Kłoda, Kolonia Rozniszew, Kurki, Latków, Magnuszew, Mniszew, Osiemborów, Ostrów, Przewóz Stary, Przewóz Tarnowski, Przydworzyce, Rękowice, Rozniszew, Trzebień, Tyborów, Wilczkowice Dolne, Wilczowola, Wola Magnuszewska, Wólka Tarnowska, Zagroby, Żelazna Nowa and Żelazna Stara.

== Neighbouring gminas ==
Gmina Magnuszew is bordered by the gminas of Głowaczów, Grabów nad Pilicą, Kozienice, Maciejowice, Warka and Wilga.
