= Kłoda, Masovian Voivodeship =

Kłoda
- Village
- Location within Poland
- Coordinates: 51°42′18″N 21°25′50″E
- Country: Poland
- Voivodeship: Masovian
- County: Kozienice
- Gmina: Magnuszew
- Population: 150

Kłoda [ˈkwɔda] is a village in the administrative district of Gmina Magnuszew, within Kozienice County, Masovian Voivodeship, in east-central Poland.
