= Dębowola =

- Village
- Location within Poland
- Coordinates: 51°42′19″N 21°21′49″E
- Country: Poland
- Voivodeship: Masovian
- County: Kozienice
- Gmina: Magnuszew
- Population: 170

Dębowola [dɛmbɔˈvɔla] is a village in the administrative district of Gmina Magnuszew, within Kozienice County, Masovian Voivodeship, in east-central Poland.
