= Przydworzyce =

- Village
- Location within Poland
- Coordinates: 51°42′44″N 21°24′22″E
- Country: Poland
- Voivodeship: Masovian
- County: Kozienice
- Gmina: Magnuszew
- Population: 260

Przydworzyce [pʂɨdvɔˈʐɨt͡sɛ] is a village in the administrative district of Gmina Magnuszew, within Kozienice County, Masovian Voivodeship, in east-central Poland.
