= Gruszczyn, Kozienice County =

Gruszczyn
- Village
- Location within Poland
- Coordinates: 51°49′2″N 21°19′58″E
- Country: Poland
- Voivodeship: Masovian
- County: Kozienice
- Gmina: Magnuszew
- Population: 220

Gruszczyn [ˈɡruʂt͡ʂɨn] is a village in the administrative district of Gmina Magnuszew, within Kozienice County, Masovian Voivodeship, in east-central Poland.
