= Kolonia Rozniszew =

- Village
- Location within Poland
- Coordinates: 51°47′45″N 21°18′8″E
- Country: Poland
- Voivodeship: Masovian
- County: Kozienice
- Gmina: Magnuszew

Kolonia Rozniszew [kɔˈlɔɲa rɔzˈniʂɛf] is a village in the administrative district of Gmina Magnuszew, within Kozienice County, Masovian Voivodeship, in east-central Poland.
