= Anielin, Gmina Magnuszew =

Anielin
- Village
- Location within Poland
- Coordinates: 51°47′N 21°16′E
- Country: Poland
- Voivodeship: Masovian
- County: Kozienice
- Gmina: Magnuszew

Anielin [aˈɲɛlin] is a village in the administrative district of Gmina Magnuszew, within Kozienice County, Masovian Voivodeship, in east-central Poland.
