= Latków =

- Village
- Location within Poland
- Coordinates: 51°46′N 21°24′E
- Country: Poland
- Voivodeship: Masovian
- County: Kozienice
- Gmina: Magnuszew
- Population: 70

Latków [ˈlatkuf] is a village in the administrative district of Gmina Magnuszew, within Kozienice County, Masovian Voivodeship, in east-central Poland.
