= Buzova =

Buzova may refer to:

- Olga Buzova, Russian television personality, model, and singer
- Populated places:
  - Buzova, Kyiv Oblast, village in the Bucha Raion, Kyiv Oblast, Ukraine
  - Buzova, Kirovohrad Oblast, village in the Kompaniivka Raion, Kirovohrad Oblast, Ukraine
  - Buzova, Kharkiv Oblast, village in the Krasnokutsk Raion, Kharkiv Oblast, Ukraine

== See also ==
- Buzivka, Dnipropetrovsk Oblast, village in the Novomoskovsk Raion, Dnipropetrovsk Oblast, Ukraine
- Buzivka, Cherkasy Oblast, village in the Uman Raion, Cherkasy Oblast, Ukraine
- Buzove, Krasnokutsk Raion, village in the Krasnokutsk Raion, Kharkiv Oblast, Ukraine
- Buzove, Vovchansk Raion, village in the Vovchansk Raion, Kharkiv Oblast, Ukraine
- Bożówka, village in Poland
