= Vyrytovo =

Vyrytovo Вырытово
- Village
- Location within Vladimir Oblast Location within Russia
- Coordinates: 55°19′N 40°22′E
- Country: Russia
- Region: Vladimir Oblast
- District: Gus-Khrustalny District
- Time zone: UTC+3:00

Vyrytovo (Russian: Вырытово) is a rural locality (a village) in Demidovskoye Rural Settlement, Gus-Khrustalny District, Vladimir Oblast, Russia. The population was 13 as of 2010.

== Geography ==
Vyrytovo is located 53 km south of Gus-Khrustalny (the district's administrative centre) by road. Payevo is the nearest rural locality.

== Notable people ==
- Ivan Kabitsin (1902-1968) - Soviet Army colonel
