= Tyborów, Kozienice County =

Tyborów
- Village
- Location within Poland
- Coordinates: 51°45′31″N 21°19′47″E
- Country: Poland
- Voivodeship: Masovian
- County: Kozienice
- Gmina: Magnuszew
- Population: 80

Tyborów [tɨˈbɔruf] is a village in the administrative district of Gmina Magnuszew, within Kozienice County, Masovian Voivodeship, in east-central Poland.
