= Wilczkowice Dolne, Masovian Voivodeship =

Wilczkowice Dolne
- Village
- Location within Poland
- Coordinates: 51°47′7″N 21°21′26″E
- Country: Poland
- Voivodeship: Masovian
- County: Kozienice
- Gmina: Magnuszew
- Population: 270

Wilczkowice Dolne [vilt͡ʂkɔˈvit͡sɛ ˈdɔlnɛ] is a village in the administrative district of Gmina Magnuszew, within Kozienice County, Masovian Voivodeship, in east-central Poland.
