= Kurki, Kozienice County =

Kurki
- Village
- Location within Poland
- Coordinates: 51°46′19″N 21°23′34″E
- Country: Poland
- Voivodeship: Masovian
- County: Kozienice
- Gmina: Magnuszew
- Population: 70

Kurki [ˈkurki] is a village in the administrative district of Gmina Magnuszew, within Kozienice County, Masovian Voivodeship, in east-central Poland.
