= Wilczowola, Kozienice County =

Wilczowola
- Village
- Location within Poland
- Coordinates: 51°44′31″N 21°20′25″E
- Country: Poland
- Voivodeship: Masovian
- County: Kozienice
- Gmina: Magnuszew
- Population: 100

Wilczowola [vilt͡ʂɔˈvɔla] is a village in the administrative district of Gmina Magnuszew, within Kozienice County, Masovian Voivodeship, in east-central Poland.
