= Bożówka =

- Village
- Location within Poland
- Coordinates: 51°43′N 21°23′E
- Country: Poland
- Voivodeship: Masovian
- County: Kozienice
- Gmina: Magnuszew
- Population: 70

Bożówka [bɔˈʐufka] is a village in the administrative district of Gmina Magnuszew, within Kozienice County, Masovian Voivodeship, in east-central Poland.

== See also ==
- Buzova
