= Żelazna Nowa =

- Village
- Location within Poland
- Coordinates: 51°48′9″N 21°20′19″E
- Country: Poland
- Voivodeship: Masovian
- County: Kozienice
- Gmina: Magnuszew
- Population: 70

Żelazna Nowa [ʐɛˈlazna ˈnɔva] is a village in the administrative district of Gmina Magnuszew, within Kozienice County, Masovian Voivodeship, in east-central Poland.
