= Chuikov =

Chuikov or Chuykov (Russian: Чуйков) is a Russian masculine surname, its feminine counterpart is Chuikova or Chuykova. It may refer to

- Evgeniy Chuikov (1924–2000), Ukrainian landscape painter
- Sergey Chuykov (born 1980), Azerbaijani futsal player
- Vasily Chuikov (1900–1982), Soviet military leader
