= 8th Guards Combined Arms Army =

Russian Ground Forces formation

- Active: October 1941 – July 1942 (7th Reserve Army); July 1942 – May 1943 (62nd Army); May 1943 – 1992 (8th Guards Army)
- Country: Soviet Union; Russia (1991–1992)
- Branch: Soviet Army; Russian Ground Forces
- Type: Combined arms
- Size: Army
- Part of: Southern Military District
- Engagements: Battle of Stalingrad; Operation Bagration; Battle of Poznań (1945); Battle of Berlin others
- Decorations: Order of Lenin

Commanders
- Notable commanders: Vasily Chuikov

The 8th Guards Order of Lenin Combined Arms Army (abbreviated 8th GCAA) was an army of the Soviet Army, as a successor to the 62nd Army of the Soviet Union's Red Army, which was formed during World War II and was disbanded in 1998 after being downsized into a corps.

The Soviet 8th Guards Army was formed from the 62nd Army in May 1943 and received Guards status in recognition of its actions in the Battle of Stalingrad. It went on to defend the right bank of the Donets and fight in the Donbass Strategic Offensive in August and September. It then fought in the Lower Dnepr Offensive, where it captured Zaporizhia. During winter and spring 1944 the army fought in the Dnieper–Carpathian Offensive. After the capture of Odessa, the army was transferred to the Kovel area and fought in the Lublin–Brest Offensive during the summer, capturing Lublin, crossing the Vistula and seizing the Magnuszew bridgehead. The army defended the bridgehead until January 1945, when it helped launch the Vistula–Oder Offensive. The army helped capture Łódź, Poznań and Küstrin (modern Kostrzyn nad Odrą). The army then fought in the Battle of Berlin. During the war it was led by its commander during the Battle of Stalingrad, Vasily Chuikov. After the war the army was stationed at Nohra, covering the strategic Fulda Gap during the Cold War. In 1993 the army was withdrawn from Germany to Volgograd (the former Stalingrad) and there downsized to a corps, before being disbanded in 1998.

== World War II ==
Activated in October 1941 as the 7th Reserve Army, the Army was re-designated the 62nd Army at Stalingrad in July 1942. It was among the victors of Stalingrad and thus re-designated the 8th Guards Army on 5 May 1943, in accordance with a Stavka directive dated 16 April 1943.

In July 1943, it took part in the Izyum-Barvenkovo Offensive (July 17–27), and in August–September in the Donbass strategic offensive operation (August 13 - September 22). Developing the offensive in the direction of the Dnieper, the Army with other troops of the Southwestern Front liberated Zaporozhye (October 14), crossed the Dnieper south of Dnipropetrovsk, and captured a bridgehead on its right bank. By this time 28th, 29th and 4th Guards Rifle Corps were part of the army.

The army was part of the 3rd Ukrainian Front during the Dnieper-Carpathian Offensive. By March 25, 1944, the Prut River had fallen and the 3rd Ukrainian Front was dispatched to secure Odessa. On April 2, Vasili Chuikov's Eighth Guards Army and Forty-Sixth Army attacked through a blizzard and, by April 6, had driven the defenders past the Dniester River and isolated Odessa. Odessa capitulated on April 10, and Soviet troops began entering Romania proper.

In June 1944 the army was transferred to the 1st Belorussian Front and took part in the Lublin–Brest Offensive, seizing and defending a bridgehead over the Vistula river at Magnuszew. Soldiers who perished during battles over Warsaw are buried at the Soviet Military Cemetery in Warsaw.

In 1945 the army was commanded by Lieutenant General Vasily Chuikov. It was part of Marshal Zhukov's 1st Belorussian Front. One of the cities which the army took in its westward drive was Poznań, which the Army seized in January–February 1945.

In a deliberate symbolic move the 8th Guards Army was then sent northwards to the center of the front, coming under command of 1st Belorussian Front; Stalin was determined that the army that had defended Stalingrad would take part in the capture of Berlin (Battle of Berlin). On 2 May 1945, Chuikov took the surrender of the German General Weidling, the commander of the Berlin Defensive Area, and the rest of the Berlin garrison. Later the Eighth Guards Army became part of the Group of Soviet Forces in Germany. On the creation of the Group of Soviet Occupation Forces in Germany in 1945, the Army consisted of:

- Headquarters at Weimar
- 4th Guards Rifle Corps (35th, 47th Guards, and 57th Guards Rifle Divisions)
- 28th Guards Rifle Corps (39th Guards Rifle Division, 79th Guards Rifle Division, 88th Guards Rifle Division)
- 29th Guards Rifle Corps (27th, 74th, 82nd Guards Rifle Divisions)
- 11th Tank Corps

=== Commanders ===
- Guard Lieutenant-General Vasily Chuikov (April 17, 1943 - October 18, 1943),
- Guard Colonel-General Ivan Maslennikov (October 21, 1943 - November 15, 1943),
- Guard Colonel-General Vasily Chuikov (November 15, 1943 - May 9, 1945).

== Cold War ==
In the summer of 1946, the 4th Guards Rifle Corps was disbanded along with the 35th, 74th, 82nd and 88th Guards Rifle Divisions. In July 1956, the 28th and 29th Guards Rifle Corps were disbanded.

During the Cold War, 8th Guards Army stood opposed to NATO forces (specifically the US V Corps) along the strategically vital Fulda Gap in West Germany. In June 1964, the 21st Guards Motor Rifle Division transferred to the 1st Guards Tank Army and was replaced by the 20th Guards Motor Rifle Division. On 22 February 1968, it was awarded the Order of Lenin for success in combat training. In May 1983, the 20th Guards Motor Rifle Division transferred to the 1st Guards Tank Army and was replaced by the 27th Guards Motor Rifle Division.

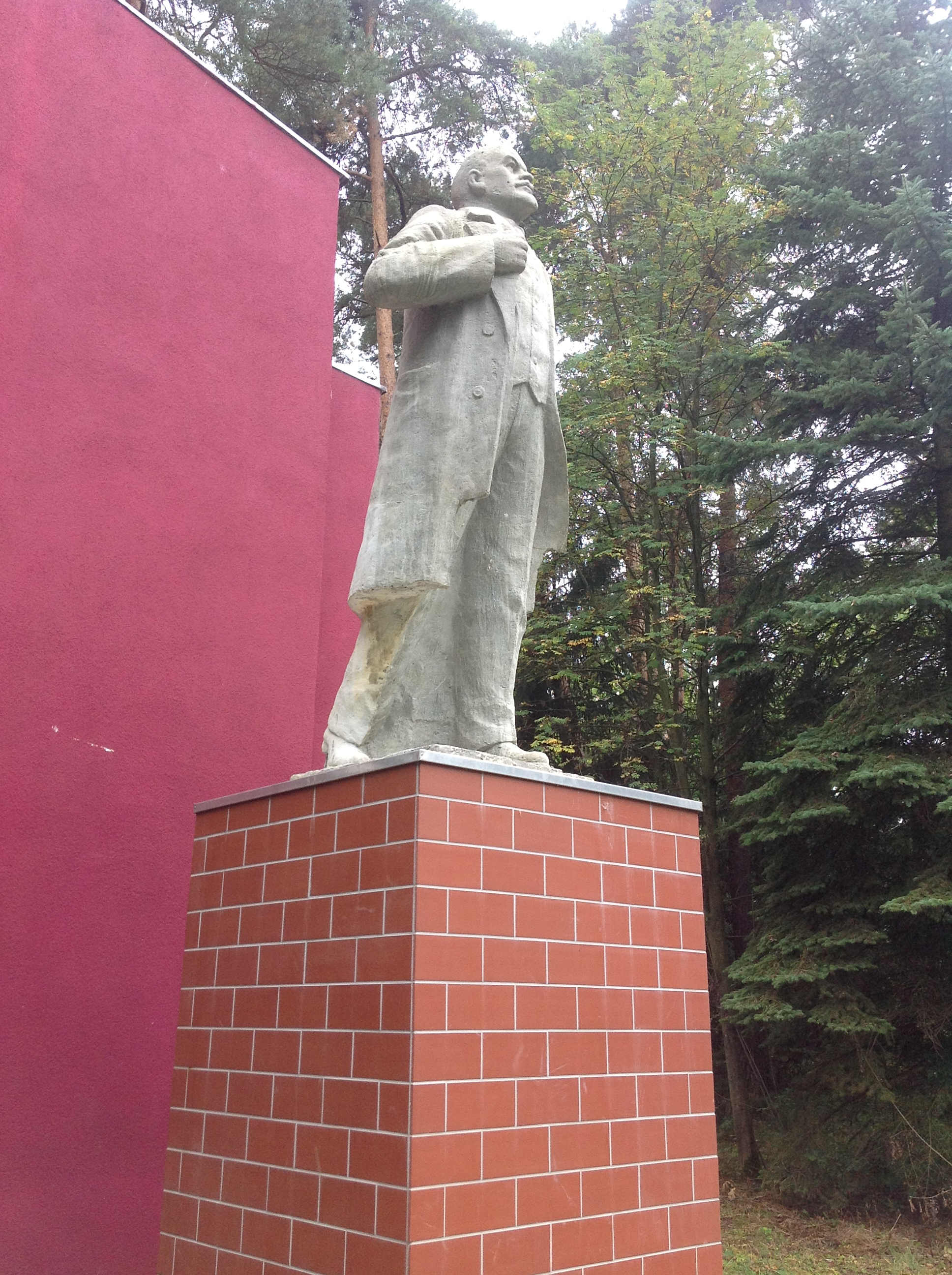
Nohra

In 1988, 8th Guards Army consisted of:

- Headquarters at Weimar-Nohra
- 227th Separate Protection and Enforcement Battalion - Weimar-Nohra
- 794th Separate Spetsnaz Company - Weimar-Nohra
- 747th Communications Center - Weimar-Nohra
- 11th Missile Brigade - Jena-Forst
- 449th Missile Brigade - Arnstadt
- 79th Guards Tank Division - Jena, GDR: - disbanded, 1992
  - 17th Guards Tank Regiment (Saalfeld)
  - 45th Guards Tank Regiment (Weimar)
  - 211th Guards Tank Regiment (Jena)
  - 247th Guards Motor Rifle Regiment (Weimar)
  - 172nd Guards Artillery Regiment (Rudolstadt)
  - 1075th Anti-Aircraft Missile Regiment (Weimar)

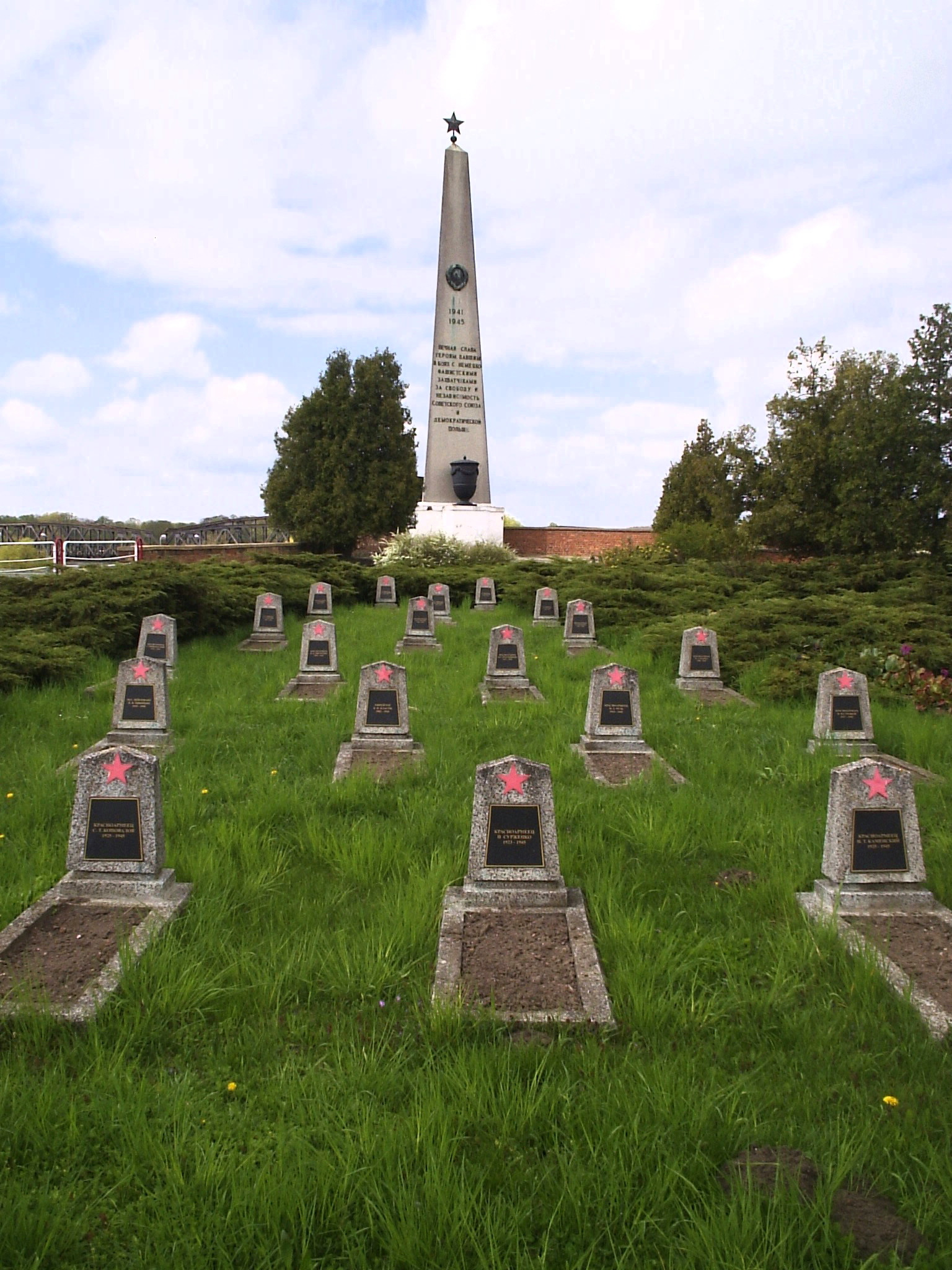
Memorial cemetery to Soviet soldiers in the Battle of Küstrin in 1945

- 27th Guards Motor Rifle Division - General-Maerker-Kaserne, Halle, GDR: - to Totskoye, Volga Military District
  - 68th Guards Motor Rifle Regiment (Halle)
  - 243rd Guards Motor Rifle Regiment (Halle)
  - 244th Guards Motor Rifle Regiment (Schlotheim)
  - 28th Tank Regiment (Halle)
  - 54th Guards Artillery Regiment (Halle)
  - 286th Guards Anti-Aircraft Missile Regiment (Halle)
- 39th Guards Motor Rifle Division - Ohrdruf, GDR: - disbanded, 1992
  - 117th Guards Motor Rifle Regiment (Meiningen)
  - 120th Guards Motor Rifle Regiment (Ohrdruf)
  - 172nd Guards Motor Rifle Regiment (Gotha)
  - 15th Guards Tank Regiment (Ohrdruf)
  - 87th Guards Artillery Regiment (Gotha)
  - 915th Anti-Aircraft Missile Regiment (Ohrdruf)
- 57th Guards Motor Rifle Division - Naumburg, GDR – disbanded, 1993
  - 170th Guards Motor Rifle Regiment (Naumburg)
  - 174th Guards Motor Rifle Regiment (Weißenfels)
  - 241st Guards Motor Rifle Regiment (Leipzig)
  - 57th Guards Tank Regiment (Zeitz)
  - 128th Guards Artillery Regiment (Zeitz)
  - 901st Anti-Aircraft Missile Regiment (Naumburg)
- 119th Separate Tank Regiment - Bad Langensalza
- 390th Guards Artillery Brigade - Ohrdruf, disbanded, 1998
- 227th Separate Protection and Enforcement Battalion - Nohra
- 18th Anti-Aircraft Missile Brigade - Gotha
- 943rd Separate Anti-Tank Battalion - Altenburg
- 194th Separate Radio Engineering Regiment - Weimar
- 46th Separate Radio Engineering Battalion - Nohra
- 678th Separate Electronic Warfare Battalion - Frankendorf
- 91st Separate Communications Regiment - Weimar
- 446th Separate Radio Relay Cable Battalion - Naumburg
- 325th Separate Engineer Battalion - Gera
- 722nd Separate Airborne Ferry Battalion - Halle
- 134th Separate NBC Reconnaissance Battalion - Gera
- 116th Material Support Brigade - Altenburg
- 173rd Separate Equipment Maintenance and Recovery Battalion - Markensdorf
- 202nd Separate Equipment Maintenance and Recovery Battalion - Oberlungwitz
- 794th Separate Special Purpose Company - Nohra
- 900th Separate Air Assault Battalion - Leipzig
- 336th Separate Helicopter Regiment - Nohra
- 65th Pontoon-Bridge Regiment - Merseburg

In February 1989, the 486th Separate Helicopter Regiment was activated at Jüterbog from the 241st, 311th, 327th and 345th Separate Helicopter Squadrons.

After the Soviet withdrawal from Germany the army was reduced in size to become 8th Guards Army Corps on 1 June 1993, and withdrawn to Volgograd, the former Stalingrad. There it appears to have taken the place of the 34th Army Corps. From June 1993 to February 1995, it was commanded by Lev Rokhlin. 8th Guards Army Corps was disbanded in May 1998.

== Bibliography ==
- Beevor, Antony; Cooper, Artemis (2002). The Fall of Berlin 1945 (1st ed.). New York: Viking.
- Feskov, V.I.; Golikov, V.I.; Kalashnikov, K.A.; Slugin, S.A. (2013). Вооруженные силы СССР после Второй Мировой войны: от Красной Армии к Советской [The Armed Forces of the USSR after World War II: From the Red Army to the Soviet: Part 1 Land Forces] (in Russian). Tomsk: Scientific and Technical Literature Publishing. ISBN 978-5-89503-530-6.
- Powell, Colin L.; Persico, Joseph (1996). My American Journey (1st ed.). New York: Ballantine Books.
