= 62nd Army =

World War II military unit

- 62-я армия
- Active: 10 Jul 1942 – 16 Apr 1943
- Country: Soviet Union
- Branch: Red Army
- Type: Combined arms
- Size: Field army
- Part of: Stalingrad Front
- Motto: "Not one step back"
- Engagements: World War II: Battle of Stalingrad

Commanders
- Notable commanders: Nikolai Krylov; Vasily Chuikov

The 62nd Army (Russian: 62-я армия) was a field army established by the Soviet Union's Red Army during the Second World War.

== History ==
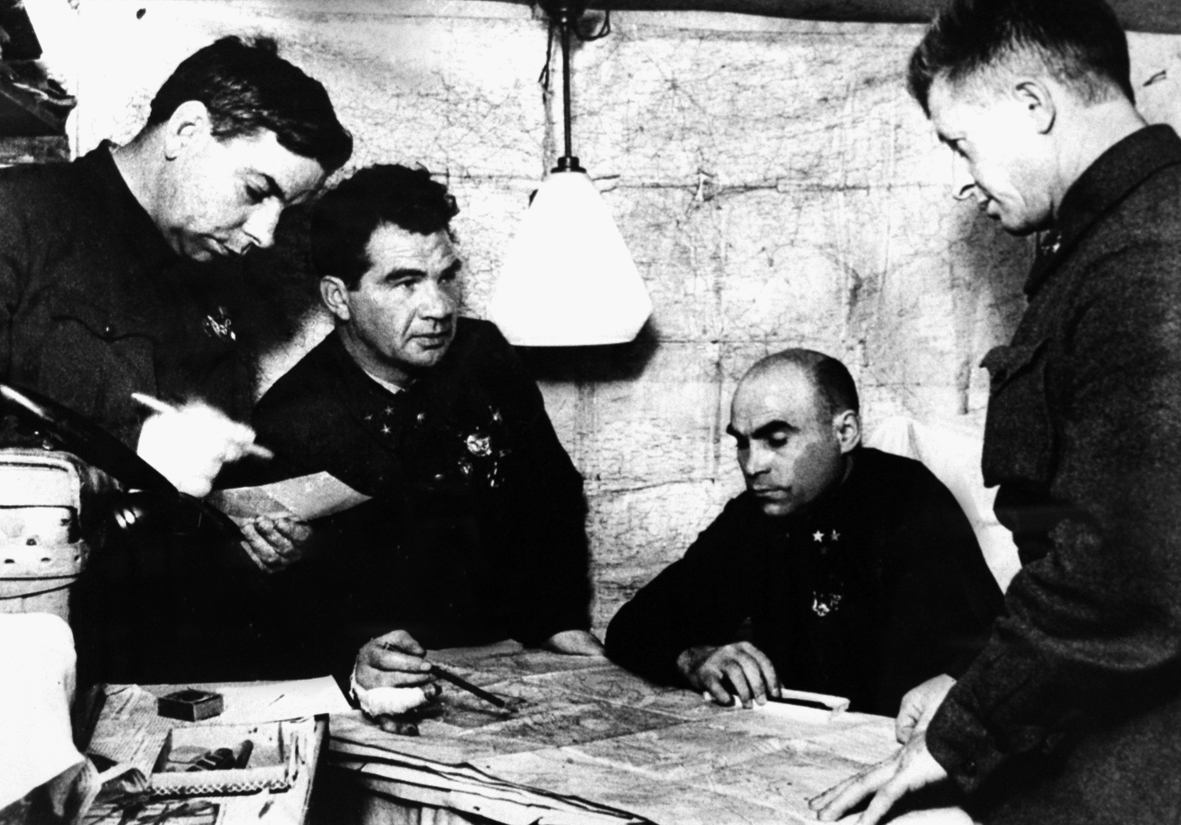
62nd Army command post in December 1942

The Army was formed on 28 May 1942 as the 7th Reserve Army, a part of the Reserve of the Supreme High Command. The formation was then re-designated as the 62nd Army little more than a month later in July 1942.

From mid August 1942 until late January 1943, the 62nd Army, under the command of General Vasily Chuikov, fought in the Battle of Stalingrad. 62nd Army conducted an epic defense of the city against repeated and desperate attacks by the German 6th Army. The Army, along with the 64th Army, was operating under the Soviet Stalingrad Front. After the German assault at Stalingrad had come to utter disaster, the 62nd Army was uniquely awarded the Order of Lenin, and granted Guards status as the 8th Guards Army.

On 13 September 1942 the Army composition was:

33rd, 35th Guards, 87th, 98th, 112th, 131st, 196th, 229th, 244th, 315th, 399th Rifle Divisions
10th, 38th, 42nd, 115th, 124th, 129th, 149th Rifle Brigades post 9-27-1942 193rd Rifle Division
23rd Tank Corps
20th Tank Destroyer Brigade
115th Fortified Region
Twelve artillery and mortar regiments

(Note: 33rd Guards, 87th and 229th rifle divisions were in the process of being brought up to strength; 131st and 399th rifle divisions were held in the second echelon of the Army.)

On 1 November 1942 during the height of the Battle of Stalingrad, the 62nd Army commanded the 13th, 37th, and 39th Guards Rifle Divisions, the 45th, 95th, 112th, 138th, 193rd, 284th and 308th Rifle Divisions, the 42nd, 92nd, 115th, 124th, 149th, and 160th Rifle Brigades, the 84th Tank and 2nd Motor Rifle Brigades, the 115th Fortified Region, and 20 regiments of howitzer, gun, antitank, mortar, rocket, and anti-aircraft artillery among other support units. Many of these formations were burnt-out shells by the end of the Battle of Stalingrad, with many formations reduced to less than 5% of its original manpower.

On 16 April 1943, the 62nd Army was granted Guards status and transformed into the 8th Guards Army.

== Commanders ==
- Jul 1942 to Aug 1942: Major General V. Ia. Kolpakchi
- Aug 1942 to Sep 1942: Lieutenant General A. I. Lopatin
- Sep 1942 to Apr 1943: Lieutenant General V. I. Chuikov
