= Nesterovo =

Nesterovo Нестерово
- Selo
- Location within Republic of Buryatia Location within Russia
- Coordinates: 52°21′N 107°52′E
- Country: Russia
- Region: Republic of Buryatia
- District: Pribaykalsky District
- Time zone: UTC+8:00

Nesterovo (Russian: Нестерово) is a rural locality (a selo) in Pribaykalsky District, Republic of Buryatia, Russia. The population was 540 as of 2010. There are 8 streets.

== Geography ==
Nesterovo is located 29 km northeast of Turuntayevo (the district's administrative centre) by road. Gurulevo is the nearest rural locality.
