= Basinów, Kozienice County =

Basinów
- Village
- Location within Poland
- Coordinates: 51°41′36″N 21°21′14″E
- Country: Poland
- Voivodeship: Masovian
- County: Kozienice
- Gmina: Magnuszew
- Population: 50

Basinów [baˈɕinuf] is a village in the administrative district of Gmina Magnuszew, within Kozienice County, Masovian Voivodeship, in east-central Poland.
