= Vaganovo, Leningrad Oblast =

Vaganovo Ваганово
- Village
- Interactive map of Vaganovo
- Location of Vaganovo Vaganovo (Leningrad Oblast)
- Coordinates: 60°05′11″N 31°01′27″E
- Country: Russia
- Federal subject: Leningrad Oblast
- Administrative district: Vsevolozhsky District
- Elevation: 21 m (69 ft)

Population
  - Estimate (2017): 1,127 )
- Time zone: UTC+3 (MSK)
- Postal codes: 188674, 188672
- OKTMO ID: 41612167111

Vaganovo (Russian: Ваганово) is a rural locality (village), part of the Rakhyinskoye Urban Settlement of the Vsevolozhsky District in Leningrad Oblast in Russia. Its population was 1,275 (2010 census).

It is located 12 kilometers (7.5 mi) from Rakhya and in 2007 had a population of 900.

The military base Vaganovo-2 is located near the village, and is home to the 1489th Guards Anti-Aircraft Rocket Regiment.
