= Grzybów, Kozienice County =

Grzybów
- Village
- Location within Poland
- Coordinates: 51°46′43″N 21°21′35″E
- Country: Poland
- Voivodeship: Masovian
- County: Kozienice
- Gmina: Magnuszew
- Population: 280

Grzybów [ˈɡʐɨbuf] is a village in the administrative district of Gmina Magnuszew, within Kozienice County, Masovian Voivodeship, in east-central Poland.
