= 39th Guards Motor Rifle Division =

Motor rifle division of the Soviet military

39th Guards Rifle Division 39th Guards Motor Rifle Division
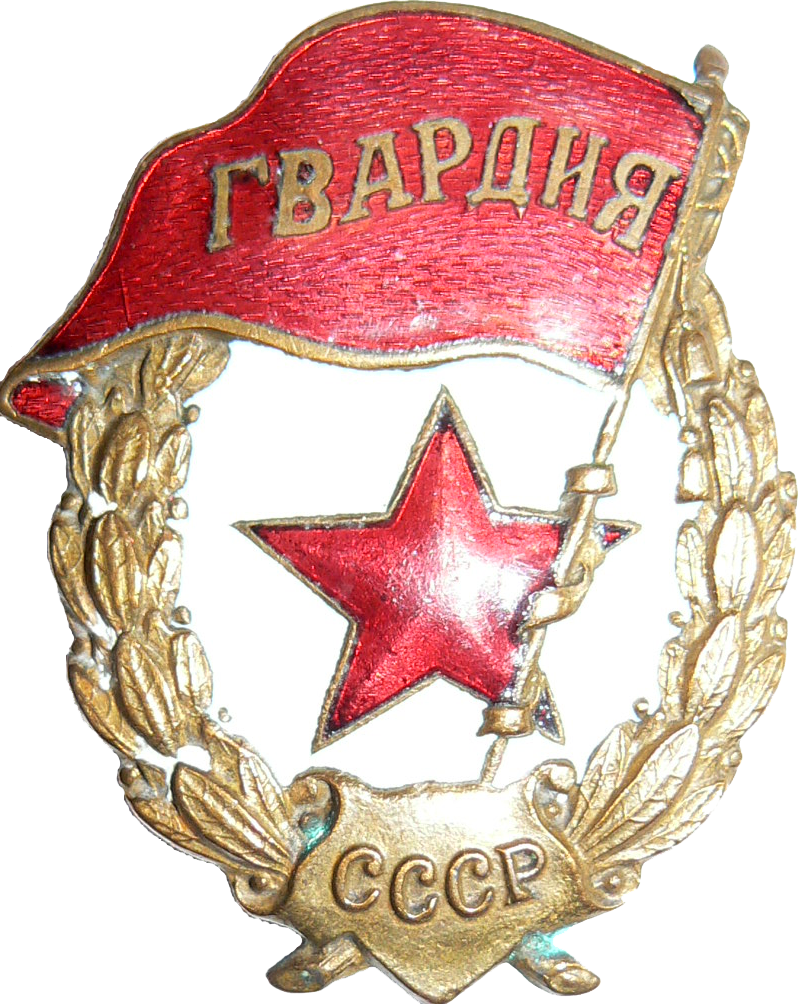
- Soviet Guards badge
- Active: 1942–1957 (Rifle); 1957–1992 (Motor Rifle)
- Country: Soviet Union
- Branch: Red Army (1942-1946); Soviet Army (1946-1991); Russian Ground Forces (1991-1992)
- Engagements: Stalingrad, Don Basin, Zaporozhe bridgehead, Nikolayev, Odessa, Kovel, Lvov-Sandomir Offensive, Lublin, Operation Bagration, Vistula-Oder Operation, Kustrin Fortress, Berlin
- Battle honours: Barvenkovskikh Guards Order of Lenin, twice Order of the Red Banner, Order of Suvorov Second Class and Order of Bogdan Khmelnitsky Second Class

Insignia
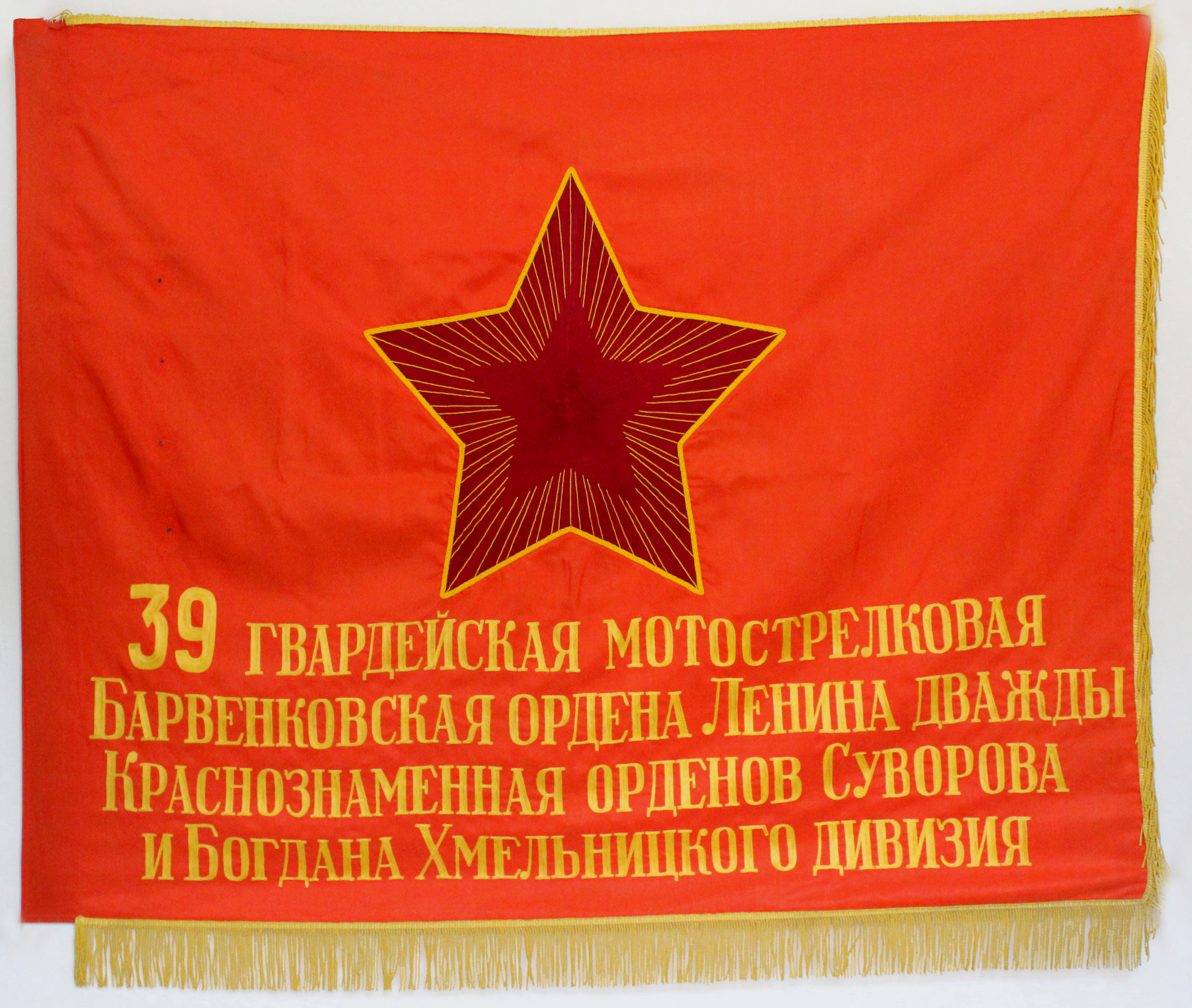
- Divisional banner (obverse)

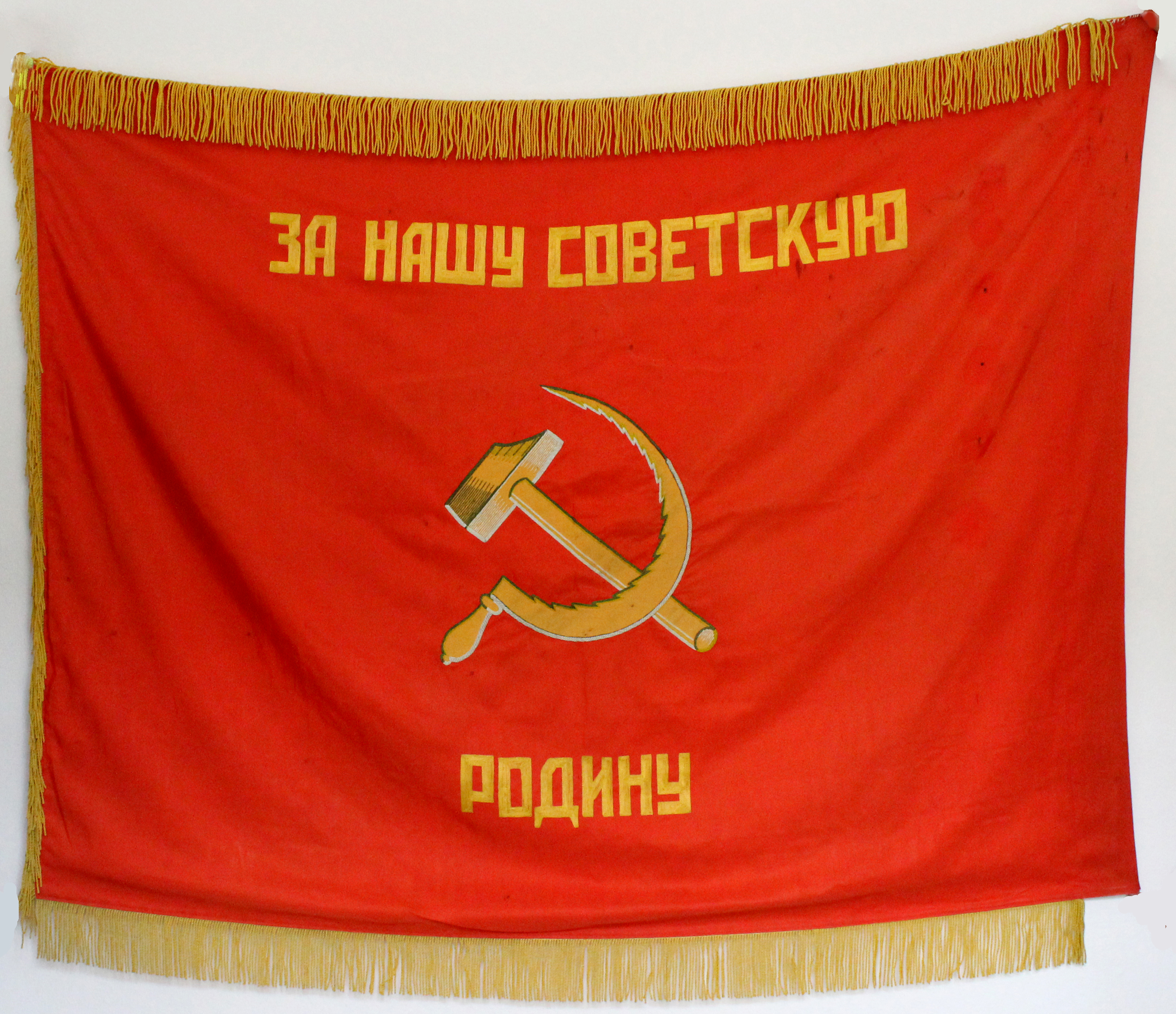
- Divisional banner (reverse)

The 39th Guards Motor Rifle Division of the Soviet Ground Forces was a mechanised infantry division active from 1965 to 1992. It was originally formed as the 39th Guards Rifle Division of the Workers' and Peasants' Red Army. It was formed during the German-Soviet War as part of the 62nd Army and assigned to the defense of Stalingrad, officially arriving at the theater in August 1942. In September the division fought through German forces which were attempting to encircle the city, and was assigned to defend the 'Volga Corridor,' the last supply line remaining for Soviet units in the city.

== Defense of the Red October Steel Works ==
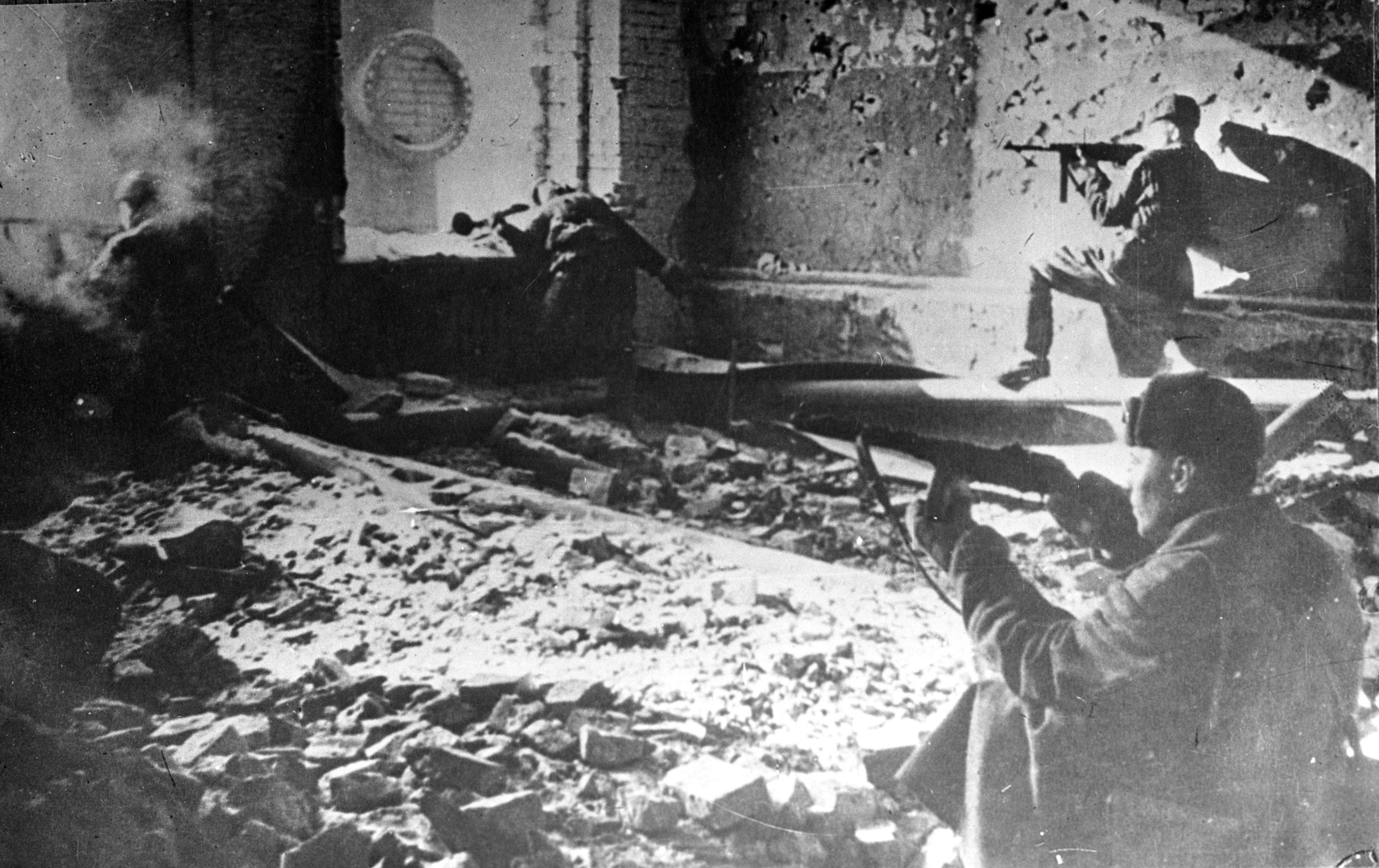
Soviet troops in the ruins of the Red October Steel Factory, October 1942

From 30 September 1942 the division, which could muster only roughly half its original strength, was assigned to defend the Red October steel works. From that date until 2 February 1943, the division was involved in almost constant combat with numerically superior German forces. On 14 October 1942 the 39th repulsed a major German counterattack by three Infantry divisions and two Panzer divisions, with 3,000 combat sorties by the Luftwaffe. For five months the 39th Guards maintained their tenuous hold on the Red October factory, holding an area only 3,000 yards wide and 1,000 yards in depth. Along with similar pockets at the Dzerzhinsky tractor factory and the Barrikady gun factory, Red October represented one of the last viable defensive positions on the west bank of the Volga River. Soviet troops fought major battles from building to building and room to room, with success often measured in mere yards. As the Germans desperately tried to eliminate these pockets they poured more and more troops into the city, weakening their flanks and wasting men and materiel in what was becoming a meat-grinder for the Wehrmacht. These factors contributed directly to the successes of the Soviet counter-offensives of November and December (see Operation Uranus and Operation Saturn), and the subsequent encirclement and eventual surrender of Gen. Friedrich Paulus's 6th Army.

== Refit and Ukraine, 1943 ==
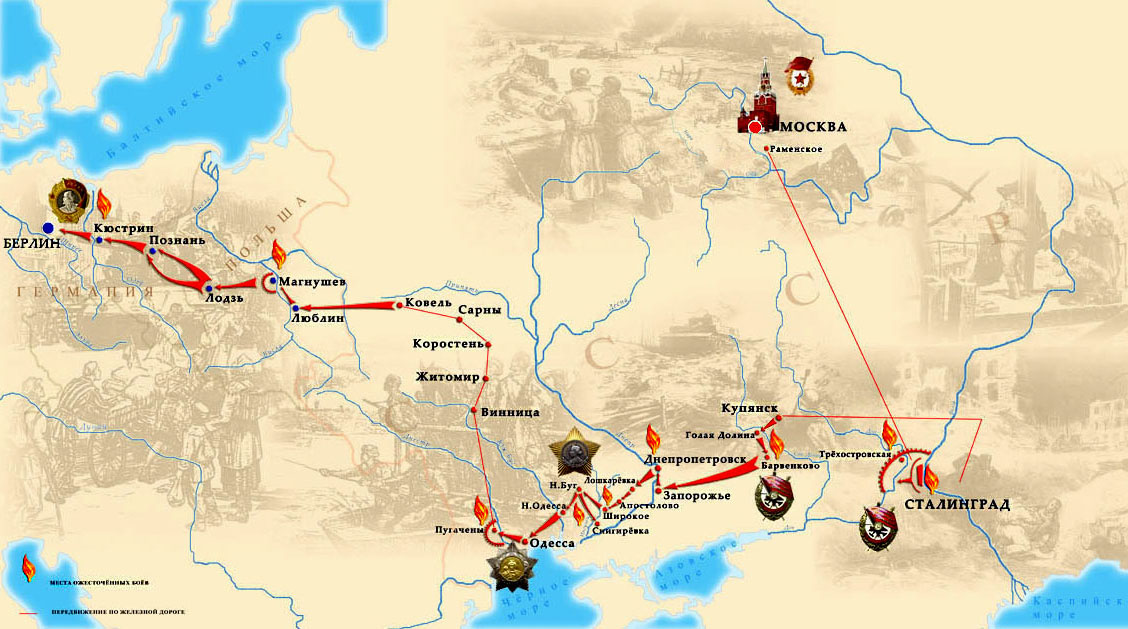
Combat path of the 39th Guards Rifle Division

Following the victory at Stalingrad the remnants of the 62nd Army, including the 39th Guards, were placed in reserve and became the basis for the newly formed 8th Guards Army, receiving the honorific 'Guards' in honor of their heroic defense of Stalingrad. The army remained under the command of Lieutenant General Vasily Chuikov, its commander in Stalingrad. Through 1943 the 8th Guards Army fought across Ukraine, crossing the North Donets River, establishing a bridgehead south of Isyum and, in cooperation with adjacent armies, advanced on the Don Basin and ultimately liberated it. They fought across the Don, through Dnepropetrovsk, continuing to Zaporozhe, and participated in the fighting on the Zaporozhe bridgehead across the Dnepr river on 10–14 October.

== 1944 ==
The division turned south and fought for the liberation of Nikolayev in March 1944, and liberated Odessa in April. Turning north into Moldavia the division liberated Kovel before participating in the Lvov-Sandomir Operation, which began on 13 July and lasted until 29 August. On 20 July they crossed the Bug River and into Poland. On 24 July the 39th Guards liberated Lublin and continued to advance on Warsaw, establishing a major bridgehead on the Vistula River which was the key for the Soviet advance towards Silesia, central Poland and the German border. They encountered furious counterattacks by German units; the 8th Army lost 17,000 men.

== 1945 and the Battle of Berlin ==
On 12 January the 39th Guards participated in the Vistula-Oder Offensive, which lasted 23 days and saw the division advance 500 km through Poland. They crushed the German defenders (including the elite "Großdeutschland Division") as they liberated the towns of Lodz and Posnan, finally arriving at the Oder River just north of Frankfurt on 3 February. They stormed the Kustrin Fortress and established a bridgehead over the Oder, within 60 km of Berlin. They attacked the city from the east, pushing through the area of Karlshorst, across Tempelhof Airport and Landwehr Canal, destroying the 11th SS Volunteer Panzergrenadier Division Nordland and then the 17th Panzer Division just south of the Reichstag.

The 39th Guards Rifle Division pushed north and fought through the Tiergarten, ending their war along Charlottenburger Chaussee at the Brandenburg Gate, meeting units from the 207th and 150th Rifle Divisions just 250 yards from the Reichstag. The final banner of the division, which had served from the center of Stalingrad to the center of Berlin, read: "39th Barvenkovskikh Guards Order of Lenin, Twice Order of the Red Banner, Order of Suvorov Second Class and Order of Bogdan Khmelnitsky Second Class Rifle Division."

== Cold War Service ==
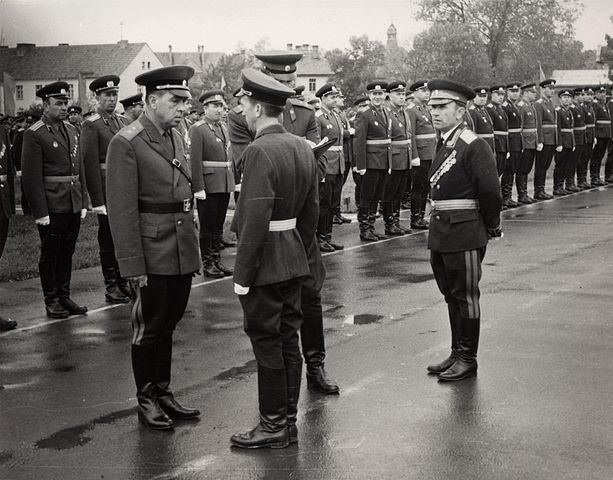
Parade of divisional soldiers, 1968

Along with the rest of the 8th Guards Army, from 1949 the division was stationed in Ohrdruf, Gotha and Meiningen, East Germany (the GDR). The 39th Guards became a Motor Rifle Division in 1957. Up until the 1980s, some regiments and separate battalions changed their garrison and were placed in other cities of Thuringia - Arnstadt and Saalfeld. It was East of the strategically vital Fulda Gap, and opposite the U.S. V US Corps in NATO's Central Army Group. The distance from the locations of parts of the division to the state border with Germany was about 5 kilometers. Withdrawal from Germany began on about 28 October 1991.

The division had the Military Unit Number 38865.

By a Resolution of the CPSU Central Committee, the Presidium of the Supreme Soviet of the USSR and the USSR Council of Ministers on 30 October 1967, the "For Service to protect the Soviet homeland and achieved high results in combat and political training and 50th Anniversary of the Great October Socialist Revolution to award the 39th Guards Motorized Rifle Barvenkovsky Order of Lenin Red Banner Orders of Suvorov twice and Bogdan Khmelnitsky Division the Commemorative Banner of the CPSU Central Committee, and leave it for an eternal possession as a symbol of valor.

Following the collapse of the Soviet Union and the reunification of Germany, the division was disbanded after a temporary relocation to Bila Tserkva in Ukraine in 1992.

=== Composition ===
In 1988 the 39th Guards Motor Rifle Division consisted of the following units:

- 117th Guards Motorised Rifle Regiment (Meiningen, East Germany)
- 120th Guards Motorised Rifle Regiment (Ohrdruf, East Germany)
- 172nd Guards Motorised Rifle Regiment (Gotha, East Germany)
- 15th Guards Tank Regiment (Ohrdruf, East Germany)
- 87th Guards Artillery Regiment (Gotha, East Germany)
- 915th Anti-Aircraft Missile Regiment (Ohrdruf, East Germany)
- 23rd independent Tank Battalion (Meiningen, East Germany)
- 489th independent Anti-Tank Artillery Battalion (Meiningen, East Germany)
- 11th independent Guards Reconnaissance Battalion (Meiningen, East Germany)
- 272nd independent Guards Engineer-Sapper Battalion (Gotha, East Germany)
- 154th independent Guards Communications Battalion (Ohrdruf, East Germany)
- 228th independent Chemical Defence Company (Gotha, East Germany)
- 49th independent Equipment Maintenance and Recovery Battalion (Ohrdruf, East Germany)
- 33rd independent Medical Battalion (Ohrdruf, East Germany)
- 1128th independent Material Supply Battalion (Ohrdruf, East Germany)
- 241st independent Helicopter Squadron (Haßleben, East Germany)

== See also ==
- List of infantry divisions of the Soviet Union 1917–1957
