= Magnuszew =

- Town
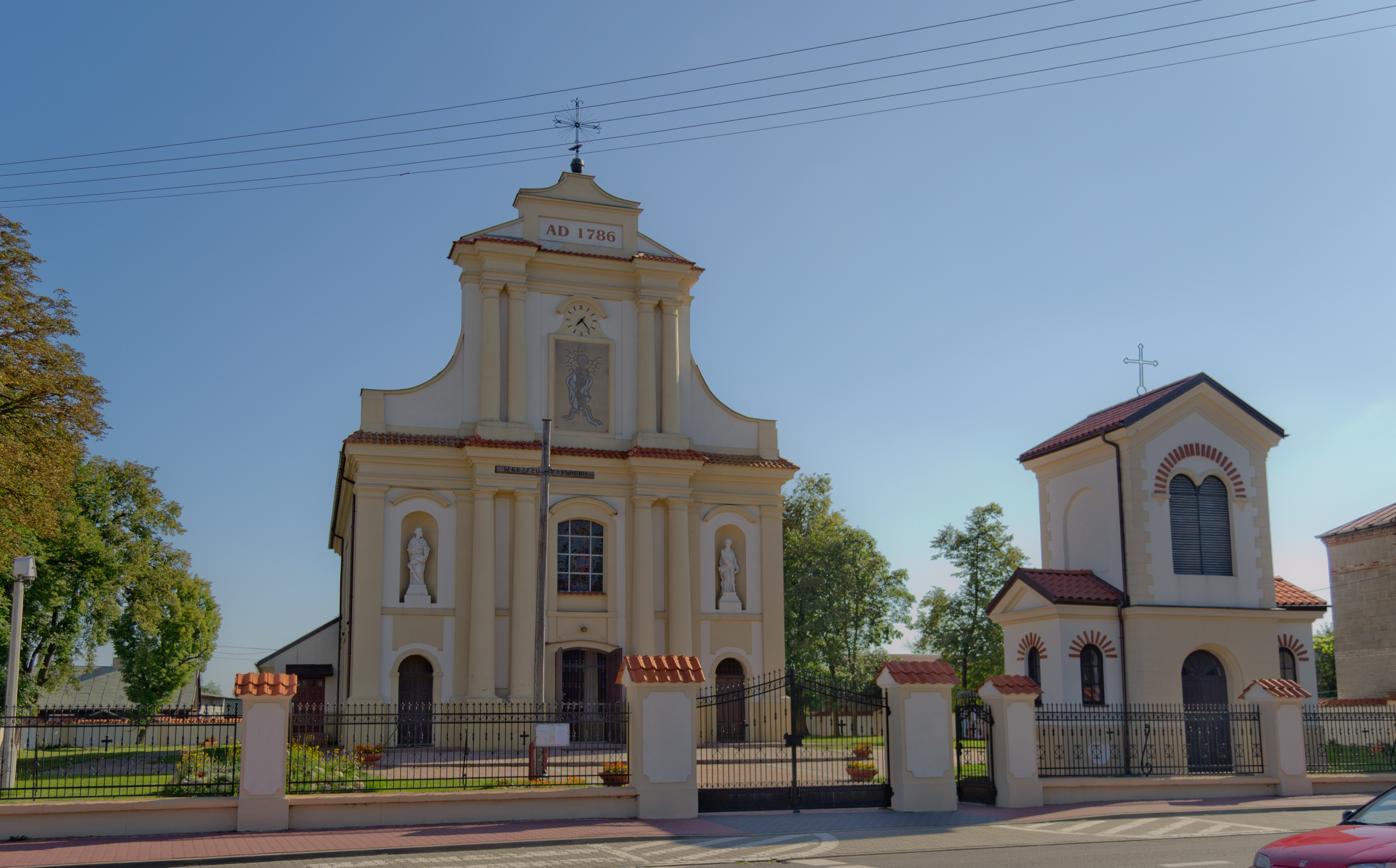
- Saint John the Baptist church in Magnuszew

- Coat of arms

- Location within Poland
- Coordinates: 51°45′N 21°23′E
- Country: Poland
- Voivodeship: Masovian
- County: Kozienice
- Gmina: Magnuszew
- Town rights: 1373

Population
  - Total: 800
- Time zone: UTC+1 (CET)
  - Summer (DST): UTC+2 (CEST)
- Vehicle registration: WKZ

Magnuszew [maɡˈnuʂɛf] is a town in Kozienice County, Masovian Voivodeship, in east-central Poland. It is the seat of the gmina (administrative district) called Gmina Magnuszew.

In 2012 it had a population of 800 (2012).

It was the site of a major battle in August 1944 during World War II, when the Soviet army established a strategic bridgehead in its vicinity, on the west bank of the Vistula.

== History ==
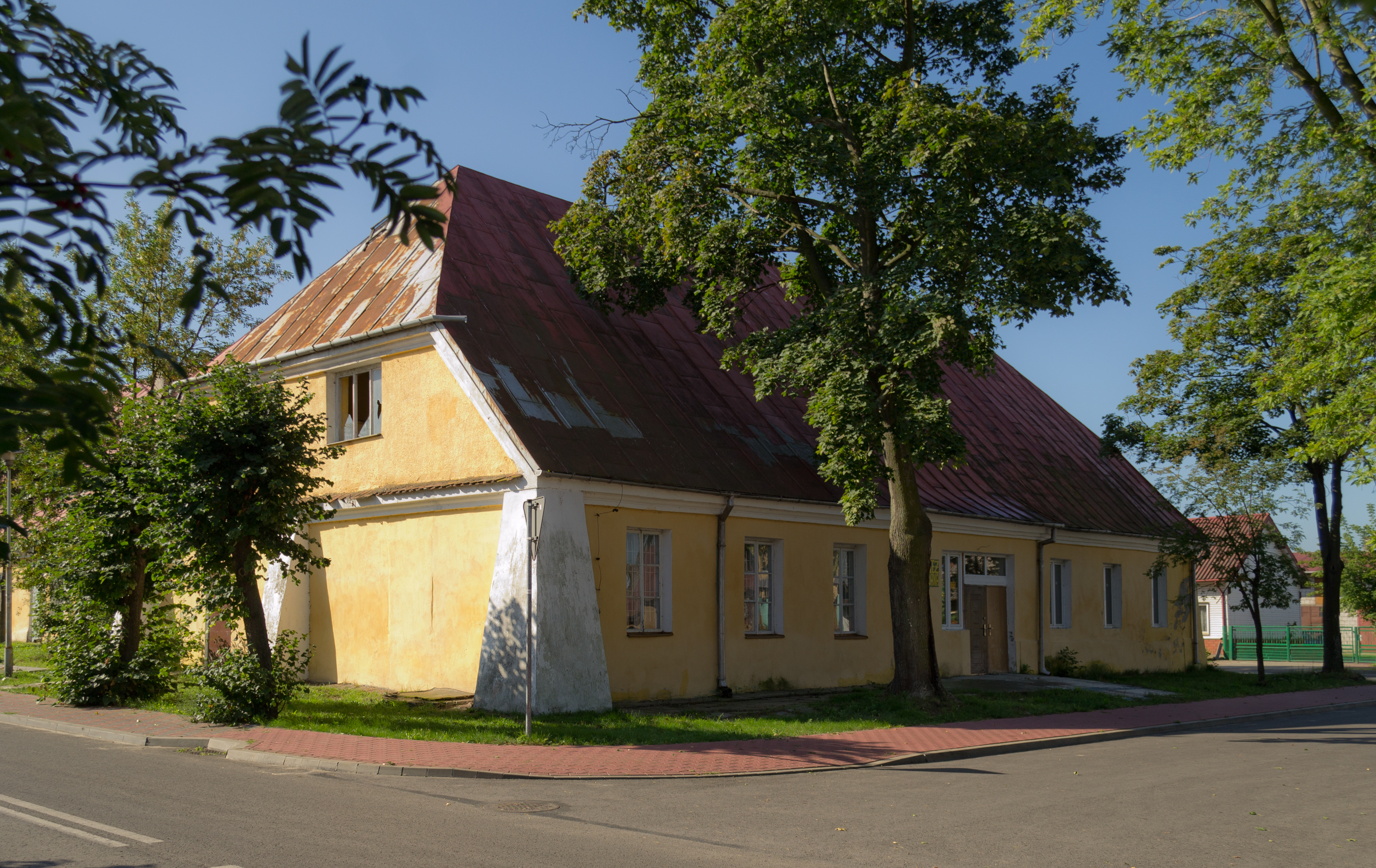
Old inn

The oldest settlement dates from the 12th century when the village, then called Magnussewo, was founded by one of the early Dukes of Masovia. In 1377, when the village was owned by Świętosław, it received Magdeburg town rights from Duke Siemowit IV. In 1576, as a result of war damage and fires that destroyed numerous wooden buildings, Magnuszew was demoted to the rank of a village. Later owners of Magnuszew were the Potocki family and - particularly powerful - the Zamoyski family. In 1655 during the Swedish Deluge, the village was burned down by the soldiers of King Charles X Gustav of Sweden. It was rebuilt, but physically moved in 1774, possibly because of changes in the course of the River Vistula.

In 1776 the new owner, Andrzej Zamoyski, restored the rank of the settlement as a town, due to a privilege granted by King Stanisław August Poniatowski. However, only two years later, in 1778, the village was again destroyed by a large fire. In the following years the town experienced numerous fires and floods, and the population declined dramatically due to epidemics such as cholera and smallpox. These various disasters left Magnuszew impoverished and once more the settlement lost its status as a town.

With the Third Partition of Poland in 1795, the town was annexed by Austria. After the Polish victory in the Austro-Polish War of 1809, it became part of the short-lived Polish Duchy of Warsaw. After the duchy's dissolution in 1815, it passed to the Russian Partition of Poland.

In around 1800 German and Jewish immigrants arrived in Magnuszew. The German settlers built farmhouses on higher ground along the banks of the Vistula. The alluvial flats near the river remained uninhabited because of flooding that hit the area at least twice a year, until levees were built in the late 19th century. Historical and linguistic research indicates that the Germans arrived from similar settlements further downstream along the Vistula. The origin of the Jewish population settling in Magnuszew is unknown. They formed a congregation that had 330 members in 1827. The most well-known of the congregation was the founder and first Rebbe of the Ger Hasidic dynasty, Yitzchak Meir Alter.

On 1 June 1869, under the ukase of Emperor Alexander II of Russia, Magnuszew lost its town rights. In World War I, the Tsarist army deported the German and Polish inhabitants of Magnuszew to the River Volga and other remote areas of Russia. As a result of the deportations and other losses the village's population decreased heavily between 1913 (3,206) and 1921 (1,568).

The Polish-Catholic and Jewish populations were roughly equal in numbers over time until World War II. Together they accounted for 80-90 percent of the local population (until 1942). Aside from a very few exceptions, the Poles were Catholics, and spoke Polish, the Germans were Lutherans and talked a Low German dialect, and the Jews were Jewish and spoke Yiddish.

=== World War II ===
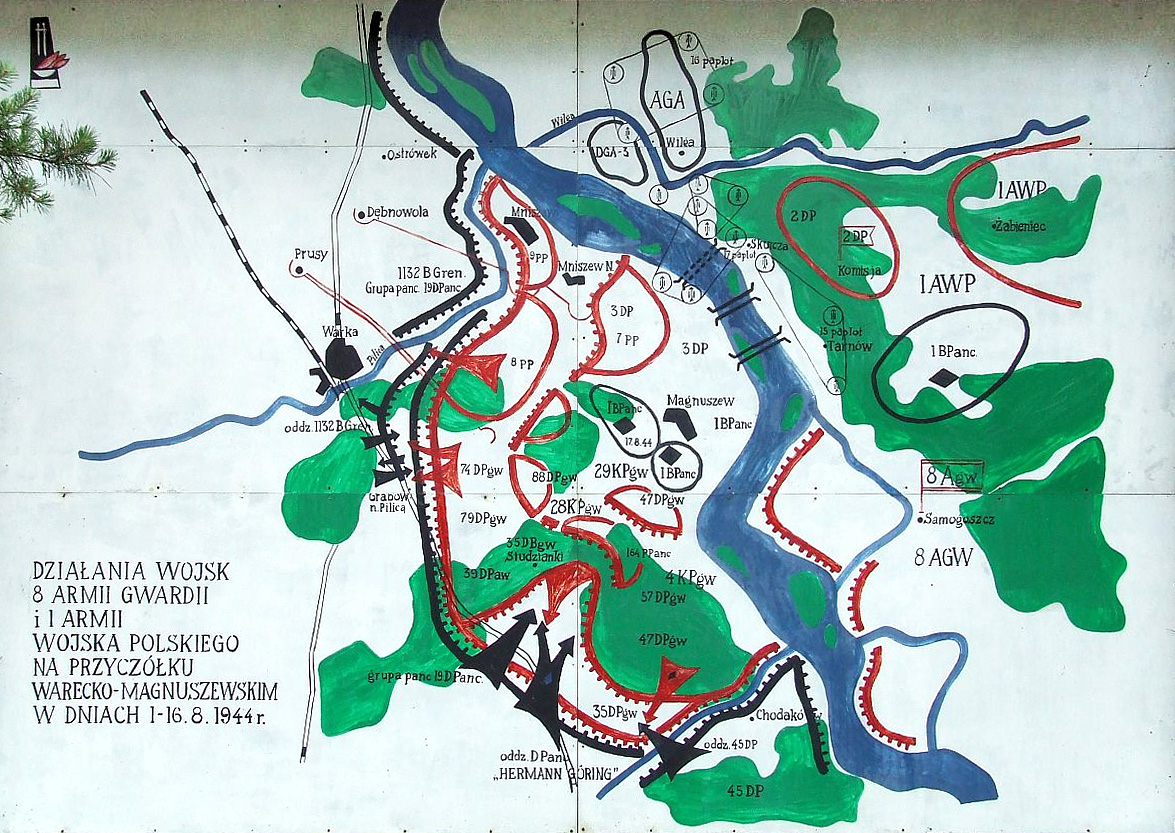
Magnuszew Bridgehead (August 1944)

A second wave of deportations, accompanied by ethnic cleansing, hit Magnuszew in World War II, when the German occupants deported its Polish inhabitants to Germany as slave workers, while the Jewish population was imprisoned in a ghetto in Magnuszew. In 1942 the ghetto was liquidated, and the Jews were either shot on the spot or transported to the Treblinka extermination camp where they were killed by gassing.

In 1944, as part of Operation Bagration, the Red Army established a bridgehead at Magnuszew (at times also called the Warka bridgehead). Heavy fighting between Soviet and German forces occurred when the bridgehead was established, and even more fighting occurred in January 1945 when the Red Army broke out of the bridgehead heading for Berlin. The town was almost completely destroyed.

== Bibliography ==
- Frank Meyer, Å se verden fra grenselandet. Det nasjonale og det transnasjonale i lokalhistorien, Historisk tidsskrift (Norwegian), 90 (2011): 213–232. ISSN print: 0018-263X ISSN online: 1504-2944
