= Steyr SSG 69 =

7.62 mm sniper rifle

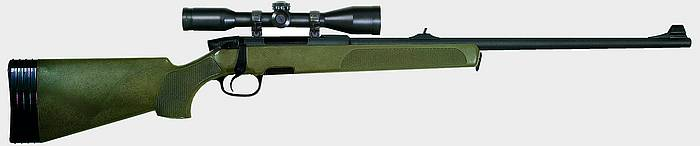
- Steyr SSG 69 PI
- Type: Sniper rifle
- Place of origin: Austria

Service history
- In service: 1969–present
- Used by: see Users
- Wars: Lebanese Civil War; Kurdistan Workers' Party insurgency Sino-Vietnamese War; Salvadoran Civil War; Croatian War of Independence; Syrian Civil War; Yemeni Civil War (2015–present); Saudi Arabian-led intervention in Yemen; Saudi–Yemeni border conflict (2015–present)

Production history
- Manufacturer: Steyr Mannlicher
- Produced: 1969–2015
- Variants: SSG 69 PI, SSG 69 PII, SSG 69 PIV

Specifications
- Mass: 4 kg (8.82 lb) (SSG 69 PI); 4.2 kg (9.3 lb) (SSG 69 PII); 3.8 kg (8.4 lb) (SSG 69 PIV)
- Length: 1,140 mm (44.9 in) (SSG 69 PI); 1,190 mm (46.8 in) (SSG 69 PII); 1,003 mm (39.5 in) (SSG 69 PIV)
- Barrel length: 650 mm (25.6 in) (SSG 69 PI, SSG 69 PII); 409 mm (16.1 in) (SSG 69 PIV)
- Cartridge: 7.62×51mm NATO/.308 Winchester, .243 Winchester, .22-250 Remington (SSG 69 PII)
- Action: Bolt-action
- Muzzle velocity: varies by type of round used
- Effective firing range: 800 m (875 yd)
- Maximum firing range: 3,700 m (4,046 yd)
- Feed system: 5-round rotary magazine
- Sights: iron sights on SSG 69 PI telescopic sight

The SSG 69 (Scharfschützengewehr 69, literally Sharpshooter Rifle 69) is a bolt-action sniper rifle produced by Steyr Mannlicher that is the standard sniper rifle for the Austrian Army.

== History ==
Designed as a sniper system to replace the SSG 98k sniper rifle (modified and accurized surplus Karabiner 98k rifles) and adopted in 1969 (hence the designation), it was ahead of its time with the use of synthetics like the stock, trigger guard, and magazines and cold hammer-forged barrels for durability. Aside from being the Austrian Army's standard issue sniper rifle, it is also used by several law enforcement organizations. For its era and weight, it is extremely accurate and several international competitions have been won using an SSG-69 with accuracy being sub 0.15 mrad (0.5 moa).

In 2015 Steyr ended production of the SSG 69.

== Design ==
The receiver and barrel were designed to provide maximum strength for minimum weight. For this the bolt action uses three pairs of rear-locking lugs (in common with the SMLE), rather than the more common front-locking lugs. This, and the fact that it is only produced in the 'short action' length, limits the chambering to non-magnum calibres. The bolt opening angle of 60 degrees is beneficial for mounting aiming optics relatively low over the receiver, and the receiver is prepared to accept the bases of SSG (quick detach) optical sight mounts.

The cold hammer forged barrel features a 304.8 mm (1 in 12 inch) twist rate to adequately stabilize the military 7.62×51mm NATO ammunition of the era. This twist rate is slow for optimally stabilizing not at the time available 7.62×51mm NATO sniping rounds loaded with 11.34-gram (175 gr) Hollow Point Boat Tail projectiles.

The fiber glass reinforced ABS polymer stock features removable spacers to adjust the length of pull and an accessory rail on the forearm bottom for mounting a bipod. The choice for a synthetic stock was remarkable, as other sniper rifles at the time were still using wood stocks. The trigger is user adjustable for trigger weight and travel.

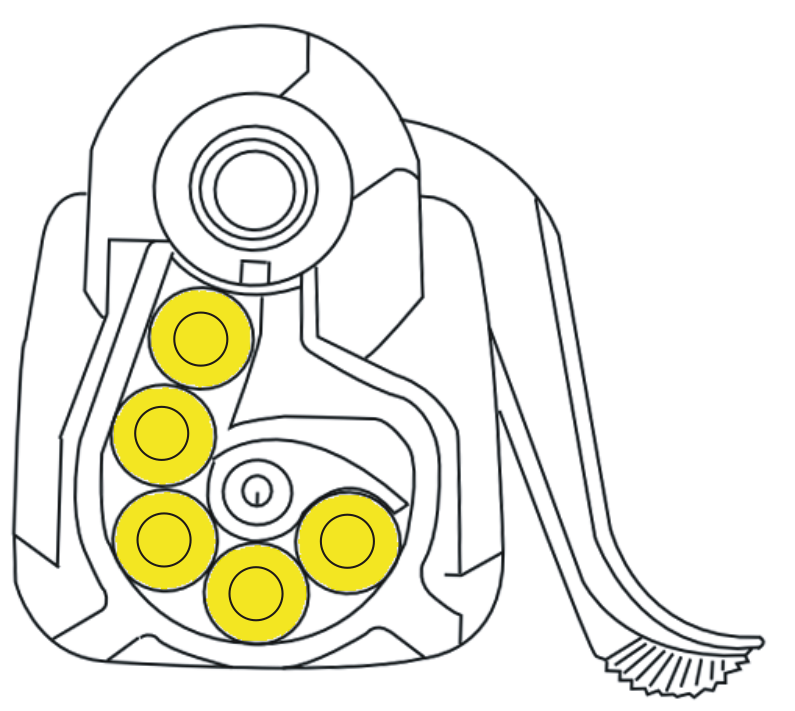
Diagram of the rotary 5-round SSG 69 magazine

The standard polycarbonate resin (branded as Makrolon by Bayer) detachable magazine features a 5-round rotary design that fits flush with the stock, although a 10-round staggered box is available as an accessory. Both are transparent-backed, immediately showing remaining capacity. Even though spool magazines are unusual in military rifles, Steyr-Mannlicher produced Mannlicher–Schönauer rifles with one from early 1900s until 1972.

The Austrian military combined the SSG 69 PI with the Kahles ZF 69 6×42 telescopic sight as an optical sight for their snipers. Later the similar Kahles ZF 84 10×42 telescopic sight was also offered. These optical sights on customer request can feature a Bullet Drop Compensating (BDC) elevation turret tuned for the ballistic trajectory of a particular gun-cartridge combination with a predefined projectile weight/type, muzzle velocity and air density at ranges.

The ZF 69 sights BDC used by the Austrian military was calibrated from 100–800 m (109–875 yd) in 100 m (109 yd) increments up to 300 m (328 yd) and 50 m (55 yd) increments from 350 m (383 yd) upwards with 9.3-gram (143.5 gr) 7.62×51mm NATO ammunition.

== Variants ==
There were several SSG variants made with differences in barrel diameter and the presence of back up iron sights and cosmetic differences like the stock colour, the only conspicuous anomaly being the SSG-PIV using a 409 mm barrel with a 254 mm (1 in 10 inches) twist designed to handle heavy subsonic ammunition in conjunction with a suppressor.

The SSG action was used in the civilian SSG Match UIT international 300 m target rifle – the international shooting union was known as the UIT back then, today the International Shooting Sport Federation (ISSF) – that featured a free floating heavy barrel, walnut wood half stock and a Walther target diopter and globe sight line.

== Users ==
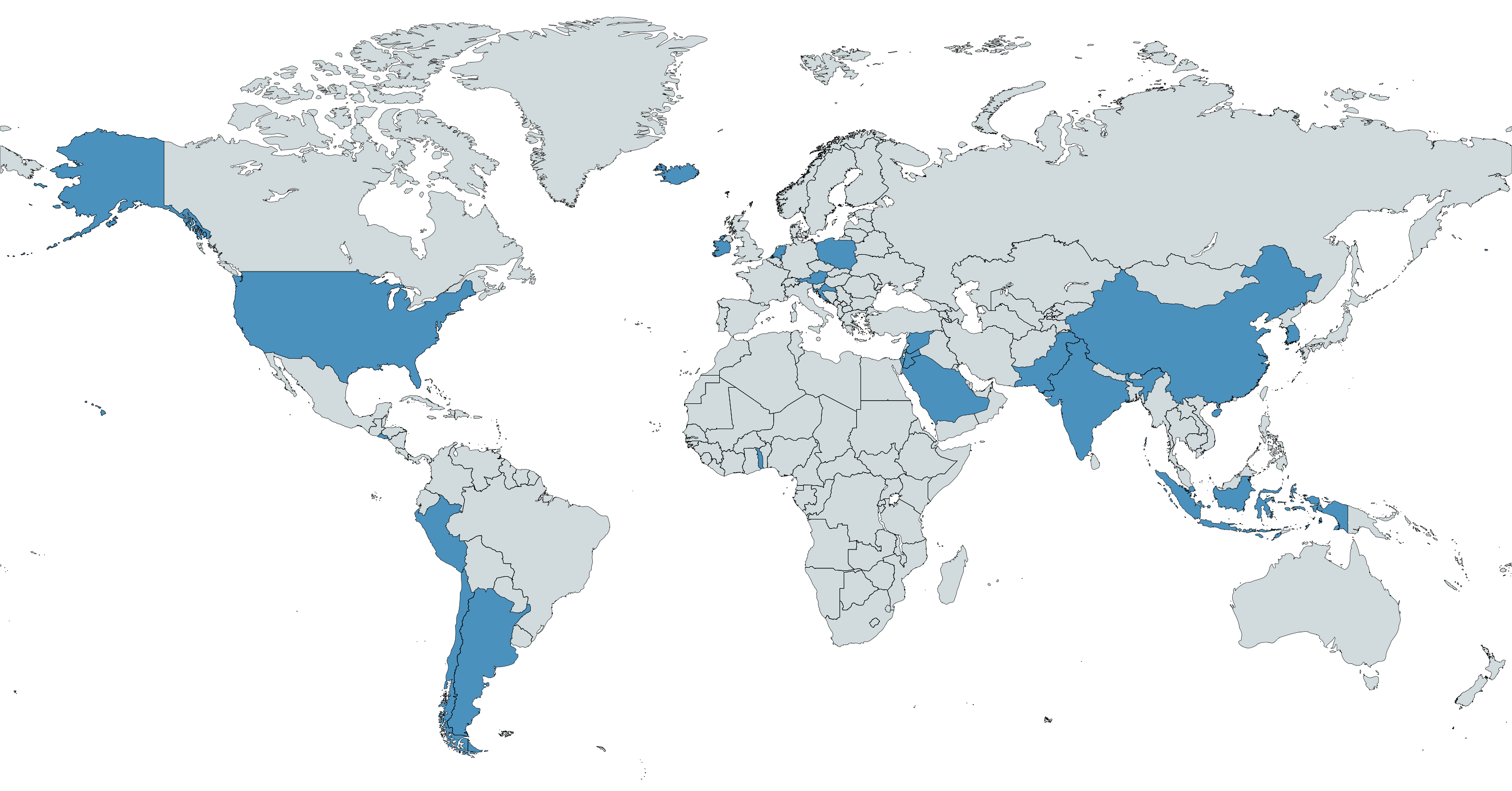
Map with SSG 69 users in blue

- Argentina: Used by the Argentine Army.
- Austria: In use by the Austrian Army and EKO Cobra.
- Chile
- China: Limited use in Sino-Vietnamese War.
- Croatia: Used by the Croatian Armed Forces Military Police.
- El Salvador
- Iceland: Used by the Icelandic Coast Guard. and Víkingasveitin.
- India: Used by the BSF, ITBP and COBRA(CRPF).
- Indonesia: Used by the Indonesian Army.
- Ireland: Garda Emergency Response Unit
- Israel: Used by YAMAM in 1980s.
- Jordan
- Netherlands: Marine Corps
- Pakistan: Used by the Pakistan Army.
- Peru
- Poland
- Saudi Arabia
- Singapore
- South Korea: Used by Republic of Korea Marine Corps.
- Togo
- Turkey: Used by Police Special Operation Department.
- United States: In use with BORTAC (United States Border Patrol).

=== Former users ===
- Ba'athist Syria

== Gallery ==
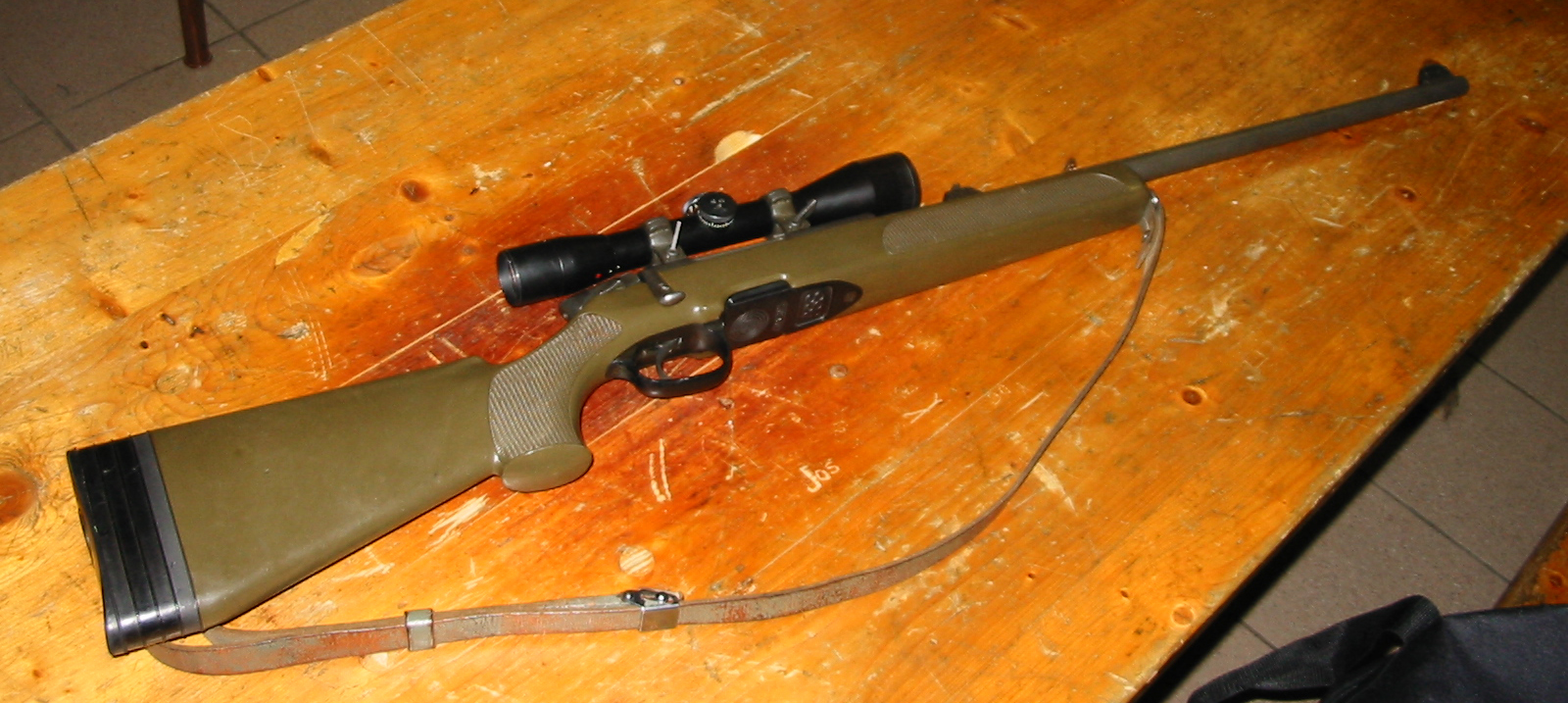
The SSG 69 (PI) with Kahles ZF 69 6×42 telescopic sight as issued to the Austrian military.

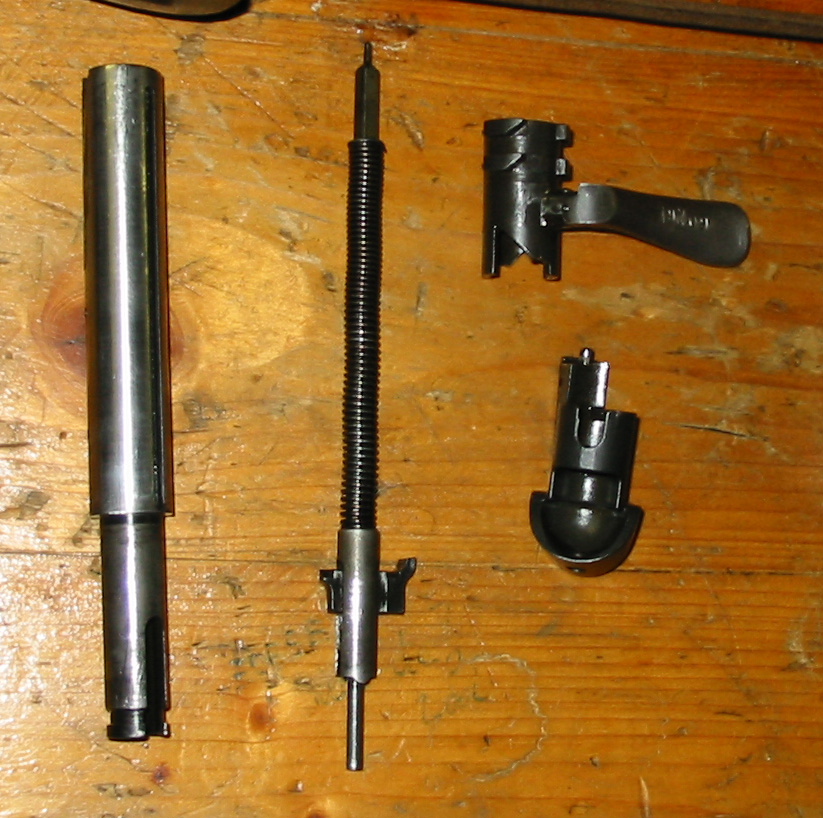
The SSG 69 bolt-action.

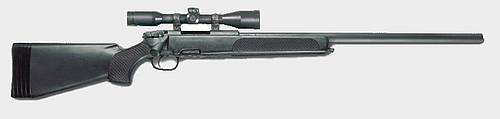
The SSG 69 PII heavy barrel variant without iron sights tailored toward law enforcement use.

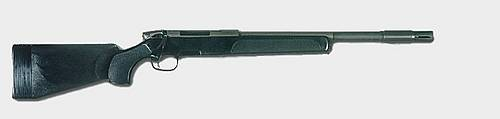
The SSG 69 PIV silenced variant.

== See also ==
- GOL Sniper Magnum
- SSG 82
- Steyr HS .50
- Steyr Scout
- Remington Model 700
- M24 Sniper Weapon System
