= Diensteinheit IX =

East German covert counter-terrorism unit of the Volkspolizei

- Active: 1973/1974 (Note: The unit was provisionally created in 1973. It was only in 1974 that DIX was fully established.)–1990
- Country: East Germany
- Agency: Ministry of Interior (MdI)
- Type: Police tactical unit
- Role: Law enforcement; Counter-terrorism
- Part of: Volkspolizei under the Hauptabteilung Kriminalpolizei initially before it was transferred to East Berlin Presidium
- Headquarters: East Berlin, Germany
- Abbreviation: DIX

Structure
- Operatives: 200

Commanders
- Notable commanders: Ernst Fabian

The Diensteinheit IX (DIX; Service Unit 9 (Note: Herzog translated the unit's name in English as Department IX.)) was a covert counter-terrorism unit of the Volkspolizei. According to Rolf Sakulowski, there was an estimated 200 operators who formerly served in the unit. DIX is considered to be the East German counterpart of GSG 9.

It was not the same as the 9. Volkspolizei-Kompanie (9. VPK; 9th People's Police Company) since it is meant to act as a counter-terrorism unit under the Volkspolizei-Bereitschaft. Otherwise, both units are called in when the MdI deems it necessary for them to be involved in situations where regular officers cannot handle it.

Information regarding the unit was only made known after the fall of the Berlin Wall.

== History ==
The Munich massacre in 1972 and the increasing crime in East German cities led to initial attempts to create specialized police units in East Germany. With the establishment of the GSG 9 and Spezialeinsatzkommandos (SEK) in the early 1970s in West Germany, the Government of the German Democratic Republic initiated the creation of a similar unit. Since no comparable force existed in East Germany at that time, it had to be created from scratch, i.e. from intelligence reports and printed literature about Western and Soviet special forces units. Most literature was provided through Stasi assistance from their agents in West Germany. Official policies regarding the unit's existence was to keep the public in the dark about it as much as possible. East Berlin didn't want people to know that crime exists in East Germany. This included the rank and file in the Volkspolizei.

The unit had been created in 1973 with provisional units before it was fully established in 1974 by Ernst Fabian with four recruits before 30 men were under the unit, being involved in the security of the Leipzig Fair on a yearly basis. After DIX was created, they never saw actual deployment against terrorists or armed criminals. In some occasions, the unit was tasked to secure important East German facilities through recon missions and important documents such as site and architectural drawings. Other instances involved included bomb threats and manhunts against Soviet soldiers who desert from their East German posts.

In 1978, DIX operators were involved in training the 9PVK with the East Germany Army. On May 18, 1979, DIX was deployed to track down a Soviet soldier who deserted his post after he shot his commanding officer at Jungfernsee, who was subdued with tear gas.

In the 1980s, DIX operators were involved in hunting down a serial rapist. This was done by disguising DIX operators as women with wigs and female clothes. DIX secured the crash site of Aeroflot Flight 892.

In December 1981, DIX was deployed to ensure the safety of Helmut Schmidt when he visited East Germany.

In 1989, DIX was ordered to be deployed against civil protest groups, but refused to comply with said orders as the protests were peaceful and did not call for violence.

On June 25, 1990, DIX hunted Sergei N. Suvorov, a Soviet soldier who deserted his post and took a family hostage in Gerwisch. A standoff took place after the soldier forced the father to drive to Burg and encountered a roadblock. After he opened fire with a submachine gun, a DIX officer killed him with a shot to the head through the car's rear window.

Upon German reunification in October 1990, some DIX operators were recruited into the SEKs after thorough political evaluation procedures, such as with SEK units in Mecklenburg-Vorpommern and in Sachsen-Anhalt. Ulrich Tauchel became the commander of the SEK's Mecklenburg-Vorpommern units in 1991. He had been previously the commander for DIX's Rostock unit.

In September 1992, Der Spiegel reported that DIX was able to get most of their non-Eastern bloc weapons by using arms dealers, some with Colombian firearms licenses and imported through Bangladesh to avoid detection. Previously, Heckler & Koch offices were searched in 1991 with warrants issued to see if they had violated firearms restrictions for these imports. There were also reports that Import-Export GmbH and Kommerzielle Koordinierung was responsible for covertly acquiring equipment for the unit. The unit gained access to Heckler & Koch firearms through help from Alexander Schalck-Golodkowski.

== Mandate ==
The unit was tasked with operations including:

- Clandestine and covert anti-crime operations
- Assisting/supporting East German law enforcement
- Counterterrorism
- Hostage rescue
- Manhunt for Soviet army deserters. The Stasi reported that 300 to 400 soldiers deserted their posts around East Germany.
- Physical security for large events, e.g. the World Festival of Youth and Students in plainclothes.
- Serving high-risk arrest and search warrants
- VIP protection

== Organization ==
The unit answered directly to the Ministry of Interior (MdI), placed under the Criminal Investigation Department (Hauptabteilung Kriminalpolizei) before it was placed under the Berlin Presidium. DIX teams were usually formed of up to 10 men. According to Fabian in an interview, the name itself was a pure coincidence when the unit learned of the nomenclature given to GSG 9. The Stasi kept the unit under surveillance to ensure it was politically reliable.

DIX was stationed in various locations, including Rostock, Schwerin, Magdeburg, Leipzig, Erfurt, Karl-Marx-Stadt (now Chemnitz), Dresden and Potsdam. These locations have teams of five to seven DIX operators. The unit was also located in East Berlin with two task force teams made up to 15 operators each.

=== Recruitment ===
Prospective recruits were recruited from the East German Volkspolizei. Prospective members had to be between 25 and 39 years old and be known to be politically reliable. They also need to be physically and mentally fit. They also need to be graduates from a Volkspolizei officer's school or technical school.

Anyone who wished to apply couldn't do so directly; the only way for an officer to join was through transfers on orders from the Volkpolizei through a recommendation from the chiefs of the various commands.

=== Training ===
Prospective recruits were trained near Verlorenwasser, where they trained under live fire conditions, ranging from close-quarters combat, counterterrorism, urban warfare, anti-hijacking and VIP protection. A decommissioned Aeroflot Tupolev Tu-134 was used to practice raiding aircraft in hostage rescue operations. DIX formerly used wooden replicas of airplane cabins.

According to Tauchel, the training programs were inspired from what the GSG 9 used after it was established.

In 2017, the Tu-134 formerly used by the unit was being moved to the Flugplatzmuseum Cottbus from the Hotel & Gasthof Deutsches Haus.

== Gear ==
The following were used by DIX after it was established:

=== Weapons ===
- KM66 knife
- Pistole-M (Note: East German-made version of the Makarov PM.)
- PSM pistol
- Skorpion vz. 61
- Heckler & Koch MP5
- PM-63 RAK
- MPi-K with riflescopes as DMRs. (Note: East German-made version of the AK-47.)
- MPi-KM (Note: East German-made version of the AKM.)
- Heckler & Koch HK33
- SSG 82 sniper rifle
- SVD Dragunov

=== Equipment ===
- Strichtarn uniforms
- PSH-77 helmets
- ZhZT-71 body armor

=== Vehicles ===
DIX has access to Lada sedans and helicopters.

== Bibliography ==
- Frank. Metzner/Joachim Friedrich B (2002). Polizei - Sondereinheiten Europas. Geschichte - Aufgaben - Einsätze. Motorbuch Verlag.
- Herzog, Martin (2025). GSG 9: From Munich to Mogadishu - The Birth of Germany's Counterterrorism Force. Casemate. ISBN 978-1636245737.
- Neville, Leigh (2019). The Elite: The A–Z of Modern Special Operations Forces. Bloomsbury Publishing. ISBN 978-1472824301.
- Sünkler, Sören (2010). Polizei Sondereinheiten. Motorbuch Verlag.
