= 6B1 ballistic vest =

Soviet body armor

6B1
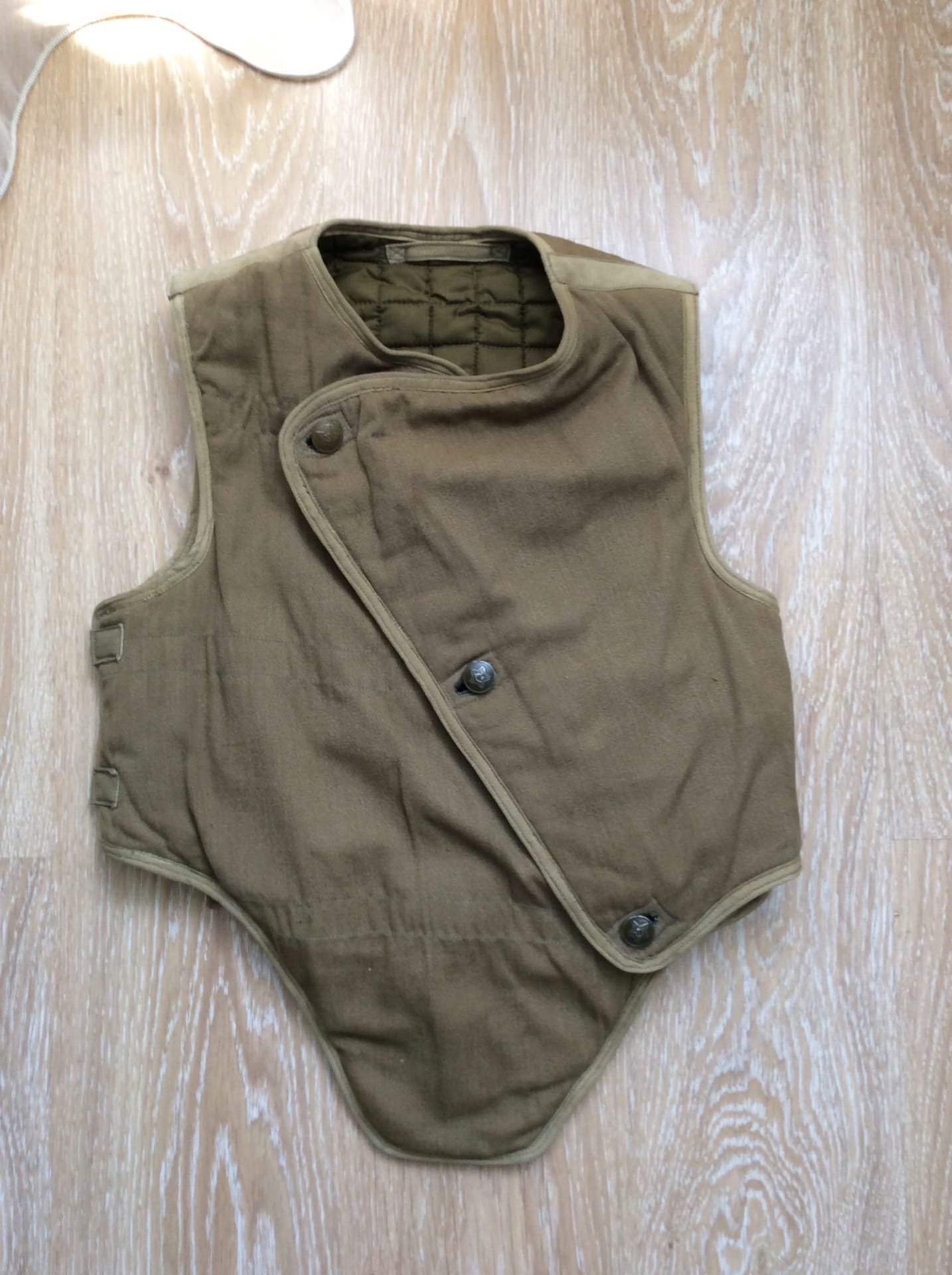
- 6B1 ballistic vest
- Type: Ballistic vest
- Place of origin: Soviet Union

Service history
- Used by: Soviet Armed Forces
- Wars: Soviet-Afghan war

Production history
- Designer: VIAM
- Designed: 1956

Specifications
- Weight: 5.3 kg

The 6B1 (Russian: 6Б1) is a Soviet ballistic vest created in 1957 for use by the Soviet Armed Forces. It was intended as a standard equipment for the Army, but was never mass produced. It saw limited usage during Soviet-Afghan war.

== History ==
6B1 body armor was developed by All-Russian Institute Of Aviation Materials (VIAM). The body armor was designed to protect primarily from fragments of artillery shells and mortar mines, which resulted in rather original construction. Development started in 1954 and lasted 3 years. In 1957 it was accepted into service with the Soviet Army.

Around 1500 units were initially produced. The vest did not enter mass production because the command of the Soviet army did not plan a mass supply of body armor to the troops in peacetime. Until the early 1990s, enterprises kept an emergency supply of materials and had production lines for the production of 6B1, which should have been enough for six months.

Almost 30 years later 6B1 was used in combat. A number of vests were removed from storage and transferred to soldiers and officers of the 40th Army at the beginning of the conflict in Afghanistan. In real combat operations in hot climates, the shortcomings of the 6B1 were clearly revealed, primarily poor heat dissipation due to the tight fit. It was decided not to organize mass production of the 6B1 because it was obsolete and did not meet modern requirements. Instead, 6B2 vest was developed and fielded.

== Design ==
The protective composition of the vest consists of mosaically arranged hexagonal plates made of “soft” aluminium alloy AMg7ts, packed in a Avizent fabric vest with a quilted cotton lining. The slightly convex aluminium plates had a thickness of 6.4 mm (chest), 5.3 mm (belly) and 4.1 mm (back), which were conventionally called 6 mm, 5 mm and 4 mm plates. Its weight was, depending on the size, 5.1-5.3 kg.

The soft vest made it possible to prevent the ricochet from the outer surfaces of the plates. When piercing the plate, the bullets do not deform and do not increase the severity of the wound. In addition to fragments, the vest could also protect against 7.62x25 fired from PPSh and PPS at a distance of more than 50 m.

== Users ==
=== Former users ===
- Soviet Union

== Gallery ==
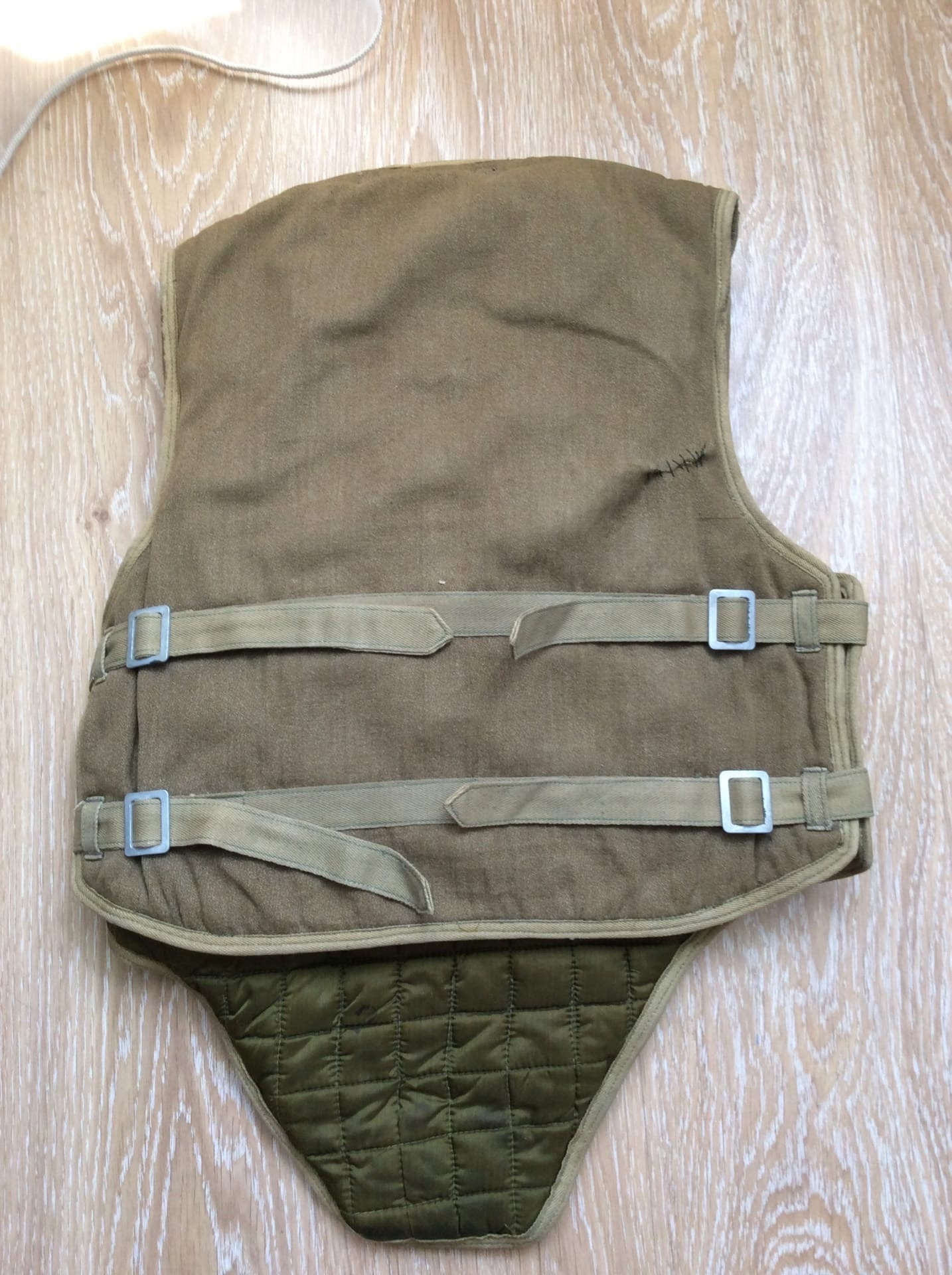
6B1 vest from behind

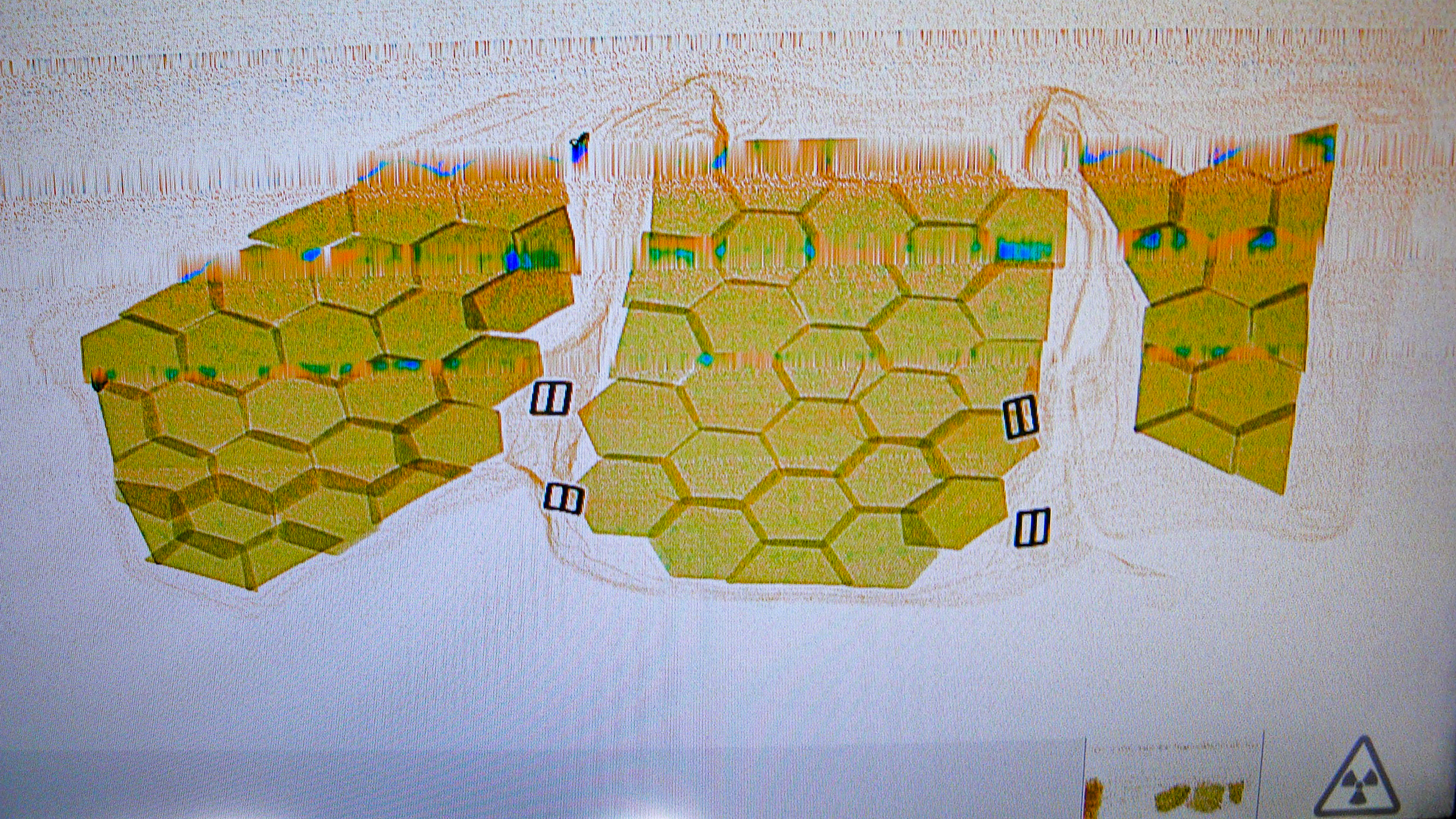
X-ray image of 6B1 body armor. Aluminium plates can clearly be seen
