= 6B2 ballistic vest =

Soviet ballistic vest

6B2 (Zh-81)
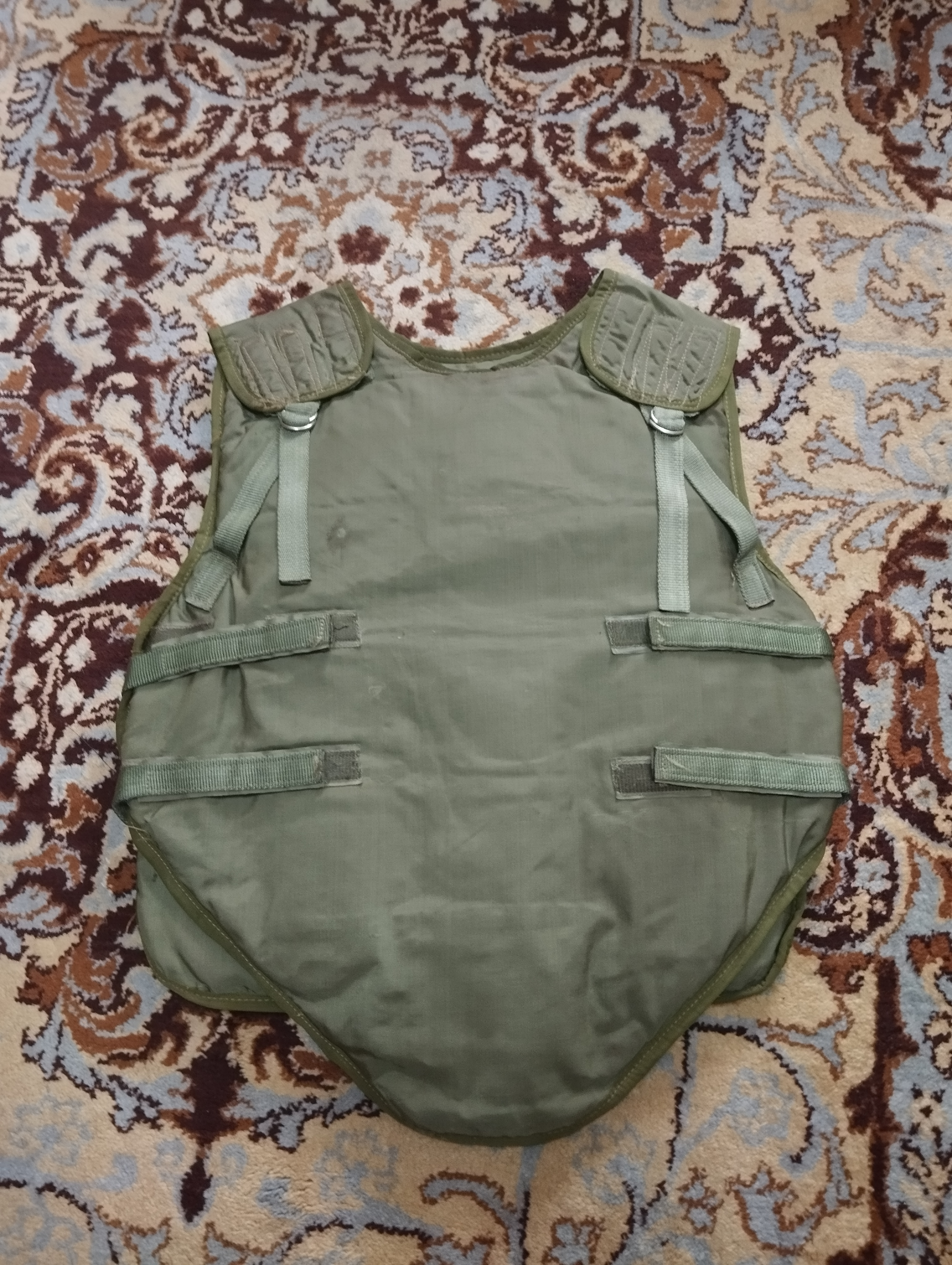
- Type: Ballistic vest
- Place of origin: Soviet Union

Service history
- In service: 1981-Unknown
- Used by: Soviet Armed Forces
- Wars: Soviet-Afghan war Tajikistani Civil War; First Chechen War

Production history
- Designer: NII Stali
- Designed: February 10, 1980
- Manufacturer: Zlatoust garment factory
- Unit cost: between $50 and $100+ USD
- No. produced: 1500 made

Specifications
- Weight: 4.2-4.8 kg

The 6B2 (Russian: 6Б2) is a Soviet ballistic vest. It is the first serial mass issued body armor of the Soviet Armed Forces, designed on the eve of Soviet-Afghan war. It was introduced into service in 1981. Use of this vest decreased losses of Soviet troops and it became the basis for the further development of domestic personal protective equipment.

== History ==
The 6B2 (Zh-81) body armor was developed by the beginning of 1980 as a personal initiative by Yuri Germanovich Ivliev, an employee of the NII Stali. The first sample was presented on February 10, 1980 at a closed meeting of the CPSU Central Committee. Based on the results of the meeting, it was decided to develop technical documentation within two and a half months and release an initial batch of the product. Production of body armor was established at the Zlatoust garment factory. During the manufacturing process, the created version of the body armor was quickly improved. The vest was introduced into service in 1981.

The creation of the body armor was preceded by the development of TSVM DZh-1 fabric made from synthetic fiber (Kevlar-like material), created at the VNIPI artificial fiber enterprise (Mytishchi).

Grau Index 6B2 was given to indicate its continuity with the first Soviet body armor 6B1, developed around 1954 at the All-Russian Institute of Aviation Materials to give protection against artillery shell fragments. Later, in 1971, the ZhZT-71 bulletproof vest was developed at NII Stali on the instructions of the technical department of the USSR Ministry of Internal Affairs. In that version of the body armor, plates were used from the most effective material at that time - OT4-1 titanium alloy. The ZhZT-71 body armor weighed about 12 kg and was not suitable for use by military personnel.

The experience of using the 6B2 body armor in the Afghan war revealed the high protective properties of the vest (it retained 100% of fragments and 42% of bullets). Disadvantages were also discovered: high cost of the product; insufficient protection against small arms bullets; the possibility of a significant increase in the severity of the injury if a bullet hits the armored panel at a certain angle; difficult heat exchange under the vest, which in hot climates led to overheating, fatigue and decreased combat effectiveness of the soldier.

In 1983, in the Turkestan Military District, tests were carried out on 6B2 vests equipped with a shock-absorbing liner (which also helped with heat exchange), which moves sections of the vest away from the user’s body and allows air to circulate freely under the vest, cooling the body. During the tests, it was found that this liner increased the time of wearing body armor and reduced injury inflicted by non-penetrating hits.

6B2 was followed by the 6B3 vest already in 1983.

The vest was also used during Post-Soviet conflicts like First Chechen War and Tajik civil war.

== Design ==
6B2 consists of a chest and back parts, connected to each other on the shoulders with a belt-buckle fasteners and on the sides with velcro fasteners.

The vest was made of an aramid fiber fabric. Titanium armor plates ADU-605-80 were placed in a fabric case. The chest part contained 19 armor plates each 1.25 mm thick and of Aramid (TSVM DZh-1) fabric liner (30 layers of fabric). The vest provides anti-fragmentation protection, including protection against arrow-shaped projectiles with a speed of 700 m/s, and protection against pistol bullets (7.62x39 bullets pierced body armor from distances of up to 400–600 meters). Anti-fragmentation resistance to a standard spherical fragment weighing 1 g exceeds 700 m/s. Depending on the size, the weight of the 6B2 body armor was 4.2 - 4.8 kg. Protection area was 28 - 30 sq. dm. A special feature of the design is the use of the so-called mounting plate (монтажная плата) into which solid armor elements were installed. All subsequent adopted Soviet body armors were designed according to the same principle. The warranty period for the body armor during storage was 5 years.

== Gallery ==
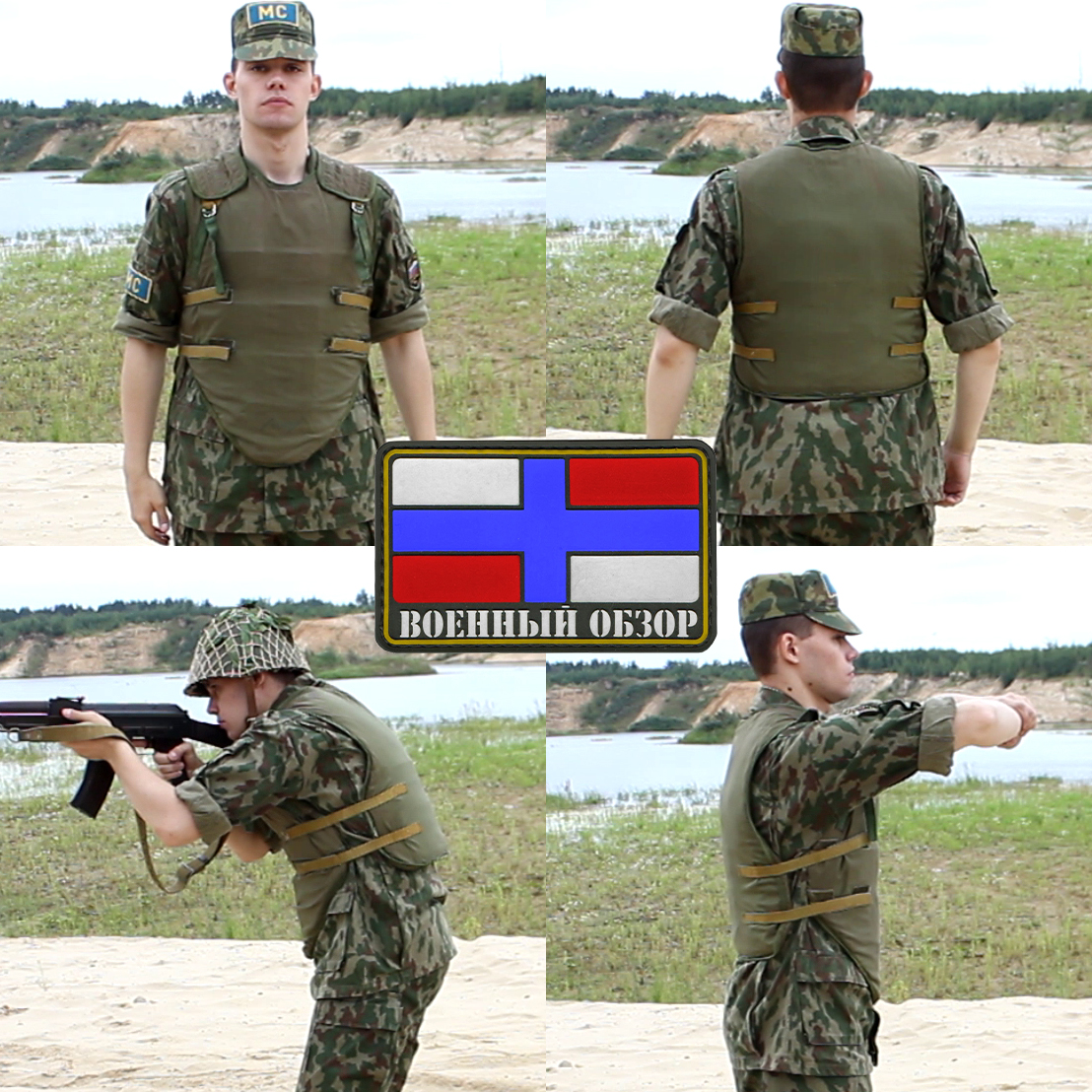
Ivan Nikolayev in 6B2 body armor

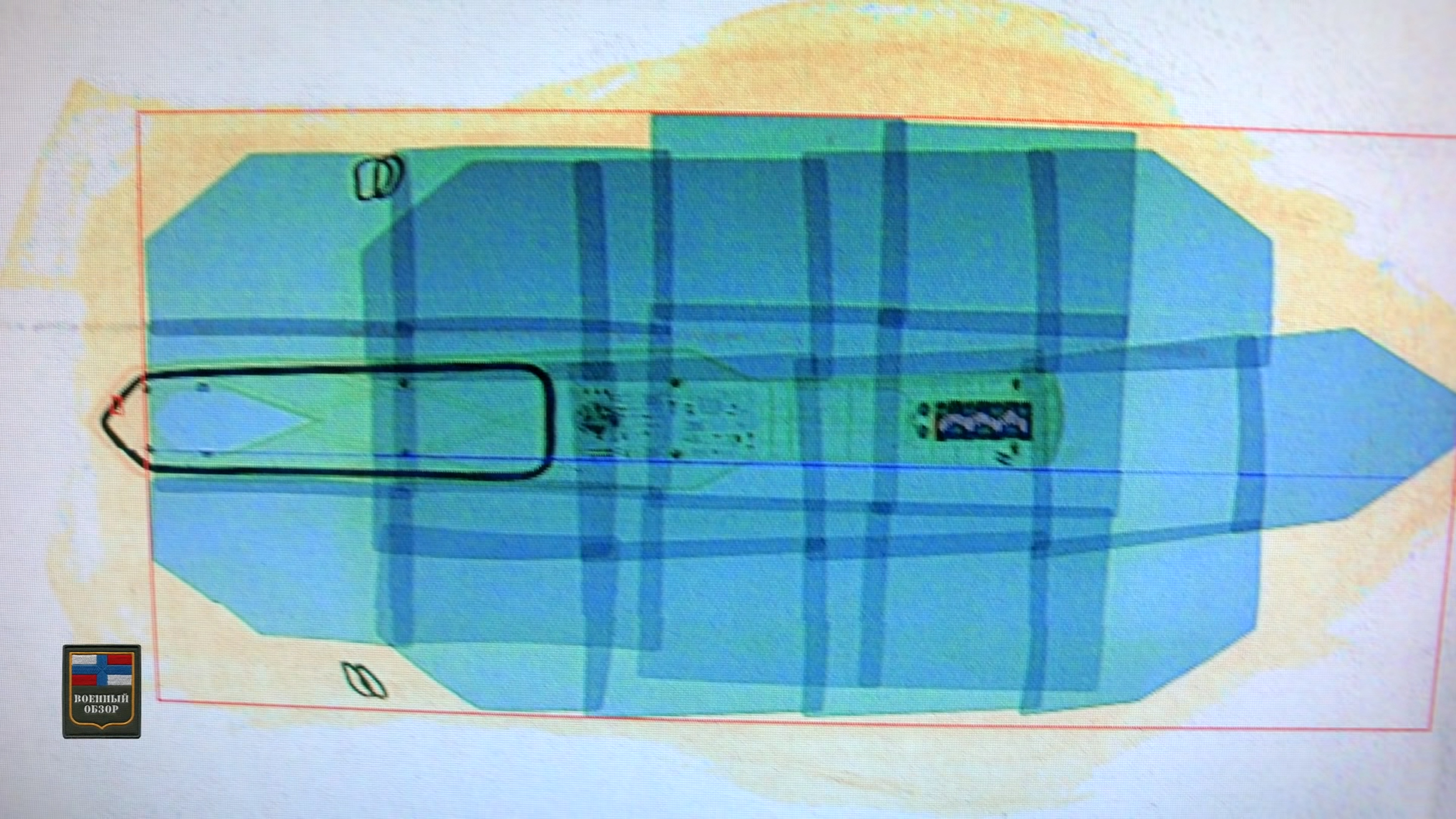
X-ray image of 6B2 body armor. Titanium plates can clearly be seen

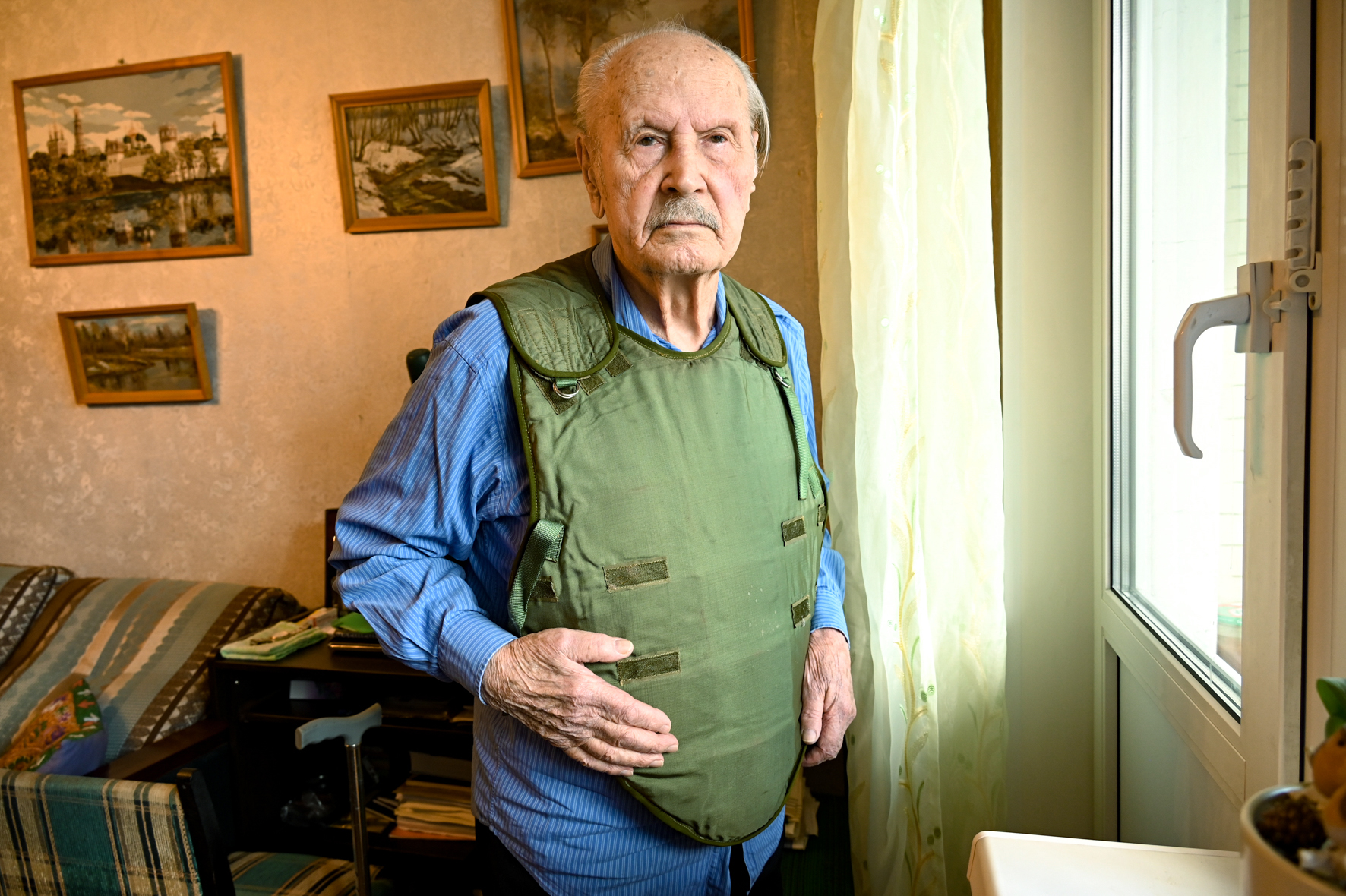
Boris Balashov wearing 6B2 vest

== Users ==
=== Former users ===
- Soviet Union
- Russia
- Tajikistan
- Ukraine
