= IHP Airpistol 0.177 =

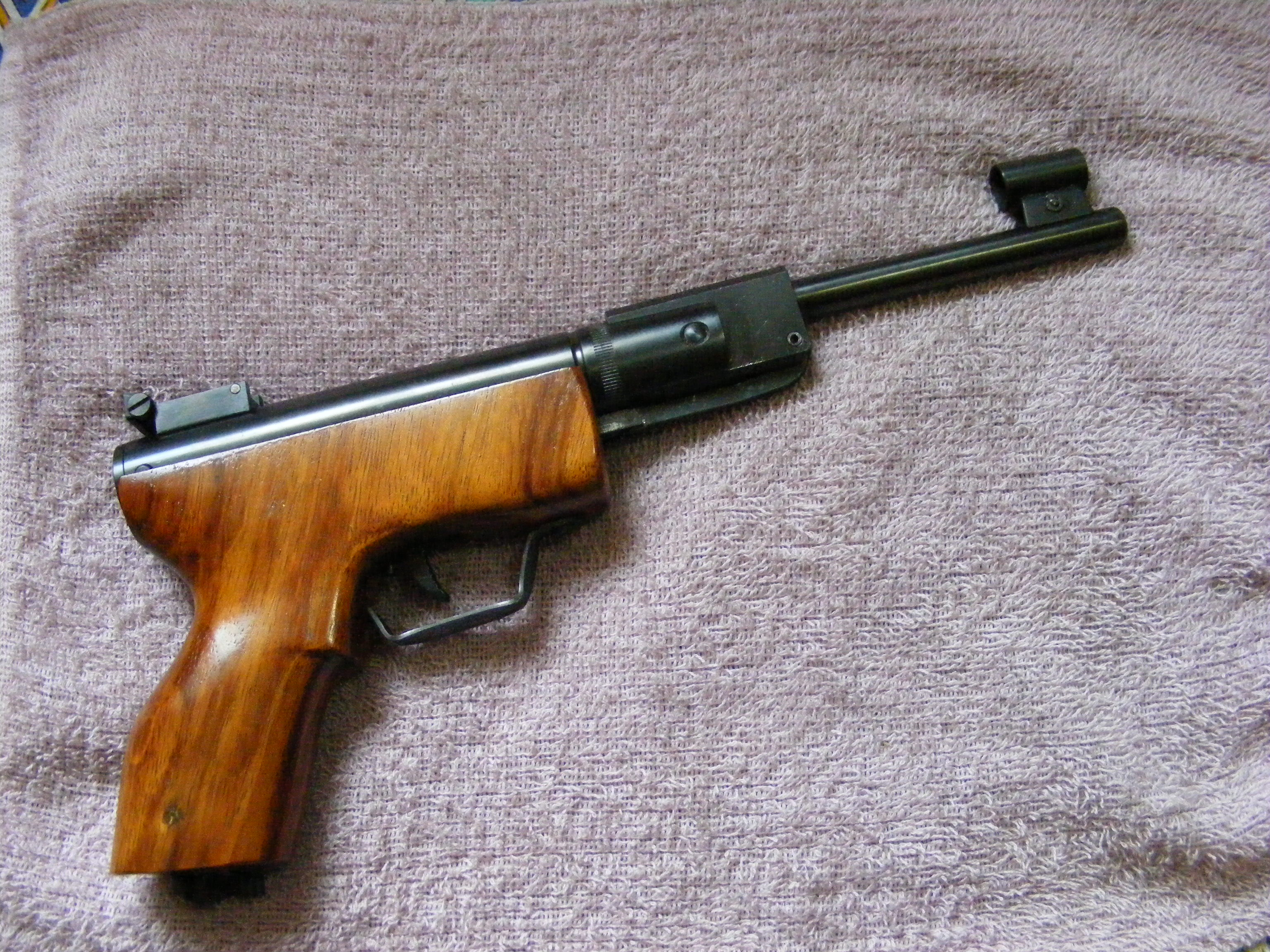
- IHP Airpistol 0.177
- Type: Air pistols
- Place of origin: India

Production history
- Manufacturer: Indian Hume Pipe Co. Ltd (National Rifles Division)
- Variants: IHP Airpistol 0.22

Specifications
- Mass: 1.2 kg
- Length: 350 mm
- Barrel length: 165 mm
- Cartridge: Diabolo air gun pellets
- Caliber: 4.5 mm (0.177 in)
- Action: Break barrel
- Rate of fire: Single Shot
- Muzzle velocity: 415 feet per second (126 m/s)
- Effective firing range: 10 metres.
- Sights: Open

The IHP Airpistol 0.177 (also known as IHP Scout) is a single shot .177 calibre break barrel, spring-piston air pistol. It is manufactured by National rifles division of the Indian Hume Pipe Co. Ltd of Ahmedabad, India. This gun has open micro adjustable sights with globe sight on the front. It has an adjustable trigger and a rifled barrel although not designed for high-precision shooting. The Pistol grip is wooden and heavy but not ergonomic. The gun can not be dry-fired without charging.

== See also ==
- National CO2 Air Pistol (.177)
- Pellet (air gun)

== Bibliography ==
- IHP Airpistol (.177) owners manual, n.d.
