= National CO2 Air Pistol (.177) =

National CO_{2} Air Pistol
- Type: Air pistols
- Place of origin: India

Production history
- Designer: National rifles division
- Manufacturer: Indian Hume Pipe Co. Ltd (National Rifles Division)

Specifications
- Mass: 1100 g
- Length: 1155 mm
- Cartridge: Pellet
- Caliber: .177
- Action: CO_{2}
- Rate of fire: Single Shot
- Muzzle velocity: 500 feet per second (150 m/s)
- Effective firing range: 10 metres.

The National CO_{2} Air Pistol is a single shot air pistol with CO_{2} powerplant. It is manufactured by National rifles division of the Indian Hume Pipe Co. Ltd of Ahmedabad, India.

== Technical features ==
"Worldwide Firearms Catalog". n.d.

- Calibre: 4.5 mm / 0.177
- Barrel Length: 228mm
- Barrel: Rifled
- Front Sight: 5 mm Wide
- Rear Sight: 4.2 mm notch
- Action: Bolt-action
- Capacity: 1 round(s).

== See also ==
- IHP National Airpistol
- IHP Airpistol 0.177
