= SSG 82 =

Scharfschützengewehr 82
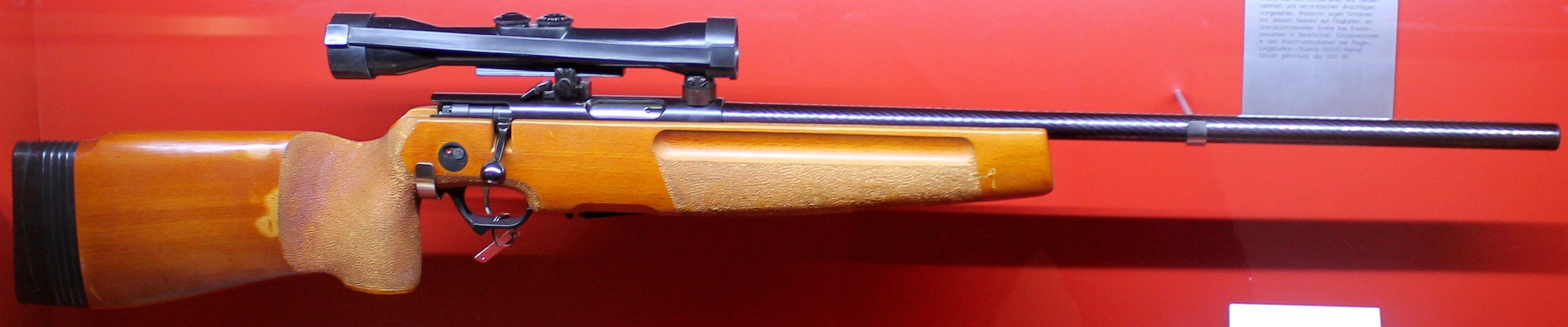
- SSG 82 fiited with a 4×32 Zeiss Jena sight on display in the Waffenmuseum Suhl
- Type: Sniper rifle
- Place of origin: East Germany

Service history
- Used by: See users
- Wars: Lebanese Civil War

Production history
- Designed: 1982
- Manufacturer: VEB Fahrzeug- und Jagdwaffenwerk "Ernst Thälmann" Suhl (FAJAS)
- No. built: 2000

Specifications
- Mass: 4.5 kg (9.9 lb)
- Length: 1,080 mm (42.52 in)
- Barrel length: 600 mm (23.62 in)
- Cartridge: 5.45×39mm
- Caliber: 5.45 mm
- Action: Bolt-action
- Muzzle velocity: 980 m/s (3,215 ft/s)
- Feed system: 5-round detachable box magazine
- Sights: 4×32 telescopic sight with German-style reticle

The Scharfschützengewehr 82 or SSG 82, (Sharpshooter's Rifle 82), is a sniper rifle chambered in the 5.45×39mm Soviet cartridge built in East Germany at the end of the Cold War.

The SSG 82 actually was specifically designed for use in the Ministry for State Security (Stasi) to stop the import of police sniper rifles from non-socialist countries and military sniper rifles from socialist countries.

== History ==
The development of the SSG 82 was done under the watch of Erich Mielke.

When Stasi HQ was occupied by activists, 10 SSG 82s were found and subsequently passed off to West Germany before they were passed on to gun collectors.

Very little was known about this weapon and very few examples have been imported into the west, with importer Century International Arms having imported around 600 at the turn of the century. It's known that at least 2000 SSG 82s were made.

== Design details ==
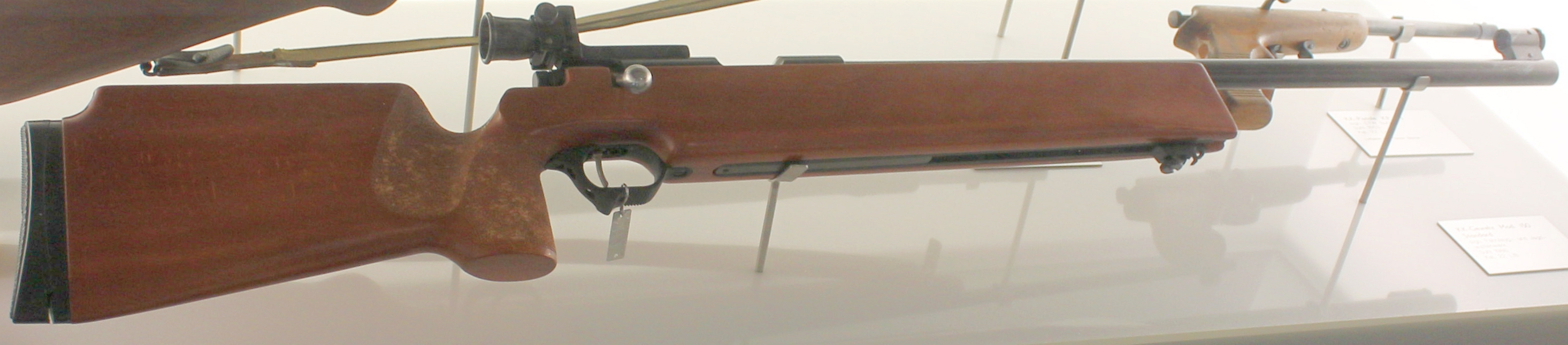
Kleinkaliber-Standardgewehr 150 (Small bore Standard rifle 150)

The Scharfschützengewehr 82 was technically based on the Suhler Kleinkalibergewehr Modell 150 Standard .22 Long Rifle (5.6 mm) caliber small bore competition rifle. This makes the SSG 82 design reminiscent of a European-style small bore competition rifle.

There were plans to have the SSG 82 include a suppressor and a night vision scope, but they were called off.

=== Barreled action ===
The heart of the SSG 82 is a cold-hammer forged receiver and free-floating barrel with a semi-bull profile and features a target crown.

The bolt has four locking lugs and requires a 60-degree bolt rotation to cycle the gun. The safety consist of a sliding safety actuated by rotating a small disk positioned at the right side just above the trigger. The two-stage trigger mechanism displays an adjustable trigger pull of 3 to 4 N (0.7 to 0.9 lb_{f}).

The detachable 6-round box magazine is double-column, double-feed. The push-forward magazine release is centered behind the magazine well.

=== Stock ===
The SSG 82 wooden stock resembles that of the Small bore Standard rifle 150 with a raised comb and a stippled pistol grip and forearm. The butt plate is adjustable for length of pull by adding or removing spacers and height.

=== Sights ===
The rifle has no iron sights, but it is equipped with a 4×32 telescopic sight ("Ziel4/S" 4×32 scope, reticle 1) with mounting rails made by VEB Zeiss Jena (in the original Zeiss plant that was captured by the Soviets at the end of WWII) which is numbered to the rifle and mounted using a quick detachable Suhler claw mountbase. This was a basic model of the VEB Zeiss Jena telescopic sight line as 6×36, 6×42M, 8×56M and variable 1.5–6×39, 1.5–6×42M and 3–12×56M magnification variants were also available.

The Zeiss Jena non-M telescopic sight models have elevation correction and focusing turrets and were, due to the lack of a windage correction turret, corrected for windage by a gunsmith during mounting, hence these sights were dedicated to a particular rifle.

=== Precision ===
Internet sources report differing information regarding the attainable accuracy of fire, though the quality of the ammunition used is often mentioned as a very important factor in obtaining good accuracy.

Reports on the accuracy of the rifle range from one hole 5-shot groups to 100 mm (4 in) 3-shot groups and anywhere in between.

== Users ==
- East Germany: The SSG 82 was used by the following units:
  - Stasi
    - Department VI
    - Department XXII
    - Department PS
- Ministry of Interior (MdI)
  - Diensteinheit IX
