= Pistole-M =

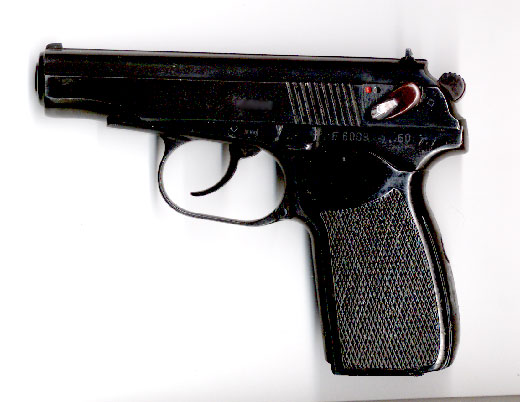
- A Pistole-M
- Type: Semi-automatic pistol
- Place of origin: East Germany

Service history
- Used by: See Users

Production history
- Designer: Nikolay Makarov
- Manufacturer: Simson
- Produced: 1959–present
- Variants: See Variants

Specifications
- Cartridge: 9×18mm Makarov.22 long rifle
- Action: Blowback
- Effective firing range: 50 m
- Feed system: 8-round detachable box magazine
- Sights: Front blade, rear notch 156 mm (6.1 in) sight radius

The Pistole-M (lit. 'M Pistol'), sometimes known as the Pistole M, is the East German licensed-made Makarov pistol variant.

== History ==
The Pistole-M was made from 1958 to 1965.

=== Operational use ===
In East Germany, the Pistole-M replaced the P1001 and TT pistols in the National People's Army. It also gained usage in the Volkspolizei. The Pistole-M is issued with a shoulder holster and a .22-cal. conversion kit with an armorer's parts kit.

The Pistole-M also found limited success in export to China and Vietnam.

=== Surplus ===
In the United States, PMs from Soviet and East German military surplus are listed as eligible curio and relic items by the Bureau of Alcohol, Tobacco, Firearms and Explosives, because the countries of manufacture no longer exist.

== Design ==
While the Pistole-M is a faithful East Germany Makarov copy, they can be recognised through the plain dark grip shells, higher polish bluing, and early features (undrilled safety lever, round safety detent holes). Another way to tell it apart is the lack of a star insignia on the grip and a lanyard loop.

== Variant ==
=== Training variant ===
Special training cutaways with serial number prefix "SM".

== Users ==
- East Germany: Used by the National People's Army, including the Border Troops of the German Democratic Republic. Also used by the Volkspolizei, including the Volkspolizei-Bereitschaft. The pistol was used until German unification in 1990.
- Germany: Saxony-Anhalt Landespolizei forces. Temporarily kept in the initial post-reunification times during lack of funds.

== Bibliography ==
- Lewis, William Julian (1982). The Warsaw Pact: Arms, Doctrine, and Strategy. Institute for Foreign Policy Analysis. ISBN 978-0076068289.
- Peterson, Philip (23 June 2011). "How Did They Get Here?". Standard Catalog of Military Firearms: The Collector's Price and Reference Guide. Iola, Wisconsin: F+W Media. ISBN 978-1-4402-2881-0.
- Rottman, Gordon (2012). The Berlin Wall and the Intra-German Border 1961-89. Osprey Publishing. ISBN 978-1849080682.
- Thompson, Leroy (2022). Soviet Pistols: Tokarev, Makarov, Stechkin and Others. Osprey Publishing. ISBN 978-1472853493.
- Tinker, Edward B.; Johnson, Graham K. (2007). Simson Lugers: Simson & Co, Suhl, the Weimar Years. Galesburg, IL: Brad Simpson Publishing. ISBN 978-0-9727815-1-0.
