= ZhZT-71 =

Ballistic vest of Soviet police

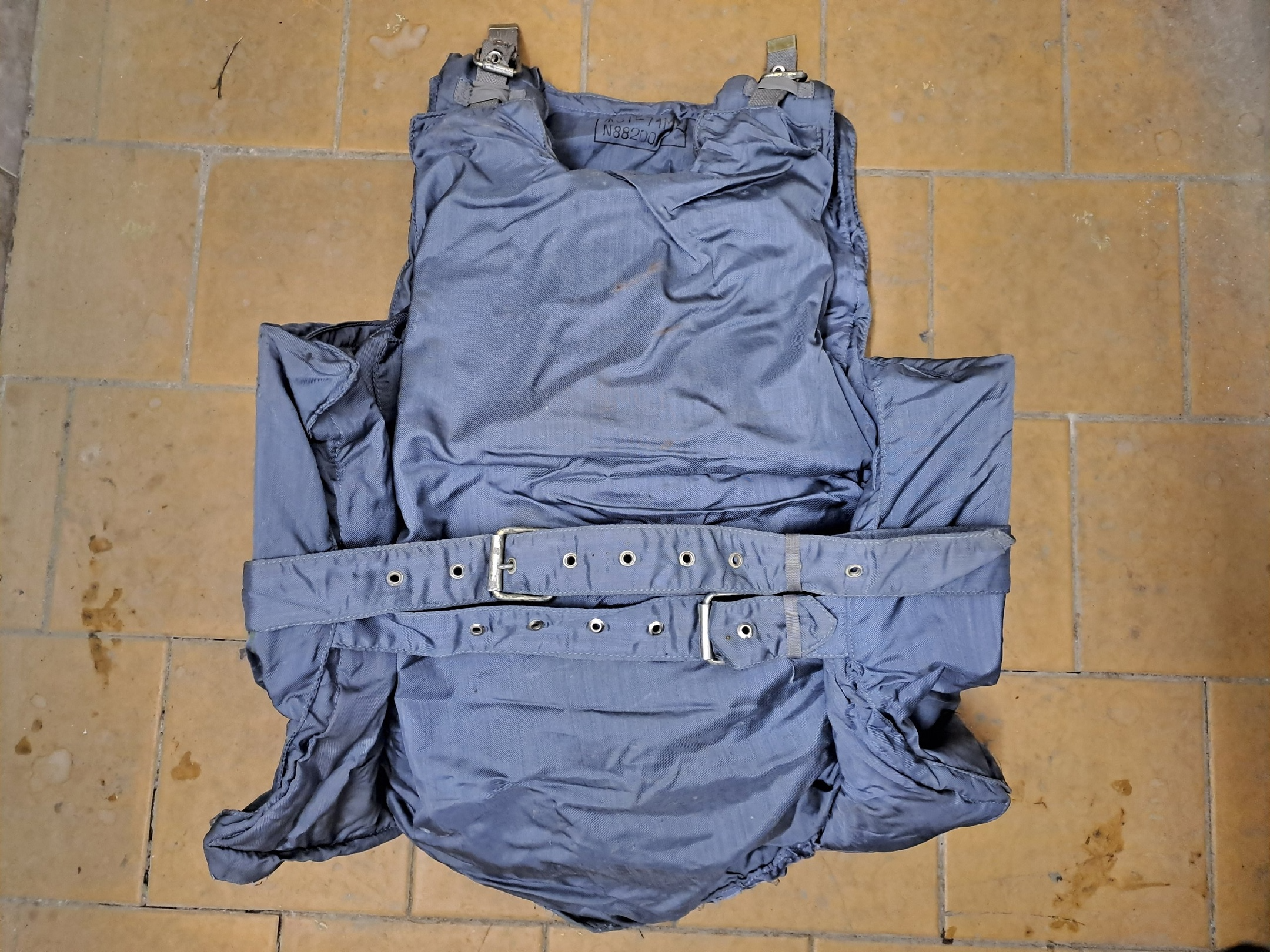
- ZhZT-71M ballistic vest
- Type: Ballistic vest
- Place of origin: Soviet Union

Service history
- In service: 1971-?
- Used by: MVD; KGB
- Wars: Aeroflot Flight 6833

Production history
- Designer: NII Stali
- Variants: ZhZT-71M; ZhZT-71U

Specifications
- Weight: 8-12 kg

ZhZT-71 (Russian: ЖЗТ-71, Жилет Защитный Титановый обр. 1971 года; Vest Protective Titanium mod. 1971) was a Soviet ballistic vest created for the MVD. It was a first ballistic vest designed for law enforcement. Design decisions made during development of its modification, ZhZT-71M, were later used in designing of 6B2 ballistic vest.

== History ==
ZhZT-71 was developed in 1971 by NII Stali, on instructions from the technical department of the USSR Ministry of Internal Affairs. In that version of the body armor, plates were used from the most effective material at that time - OT4-1 titanium alloy. ZhZT-71 weighed up to 12 kg.

In 1974, NII Stali started development of ZhZT-71M, a version that addressed several issues at once (like plates drifting inside the vest and being offset over time). It also had a new dampener layer 30 mm thick on the chest, and 10 on the back, made out of foam rubber Polyurethane. Weight increased to over 10 kg, due to thicker 3.3 mm plates that were used to meet the requirements of stopping buckshot rounds from shotguns.

In 1975 a vest was designed for protection against cold weapons - ZhZL-74 with a weight of 3.4 kg. Plates were made out of aluminum.

It was used by Alpha Group personnel during operation to free the hostages of Aeroflot Flight 6833.

ZhZT vest was still in service as late as 1990s.

== Design ==
Protection was from 2.5 mm thick titanium plates, connected with one another by rivets, placed inside of pockets made out of Nylon 6. The vest had several issues, one of the major one being lack of shock absorption, which resulted in backface damage to the wearer. To address this major issue in 1975 a modernized vest, ZhZT-71U started to be manufactured, which had a damper layer.

== Users ==
=== Former users ===
- Hungary: Used by TEK.
- Soviet Union
