= Diopter sight =

Aiming device, usually for firearms

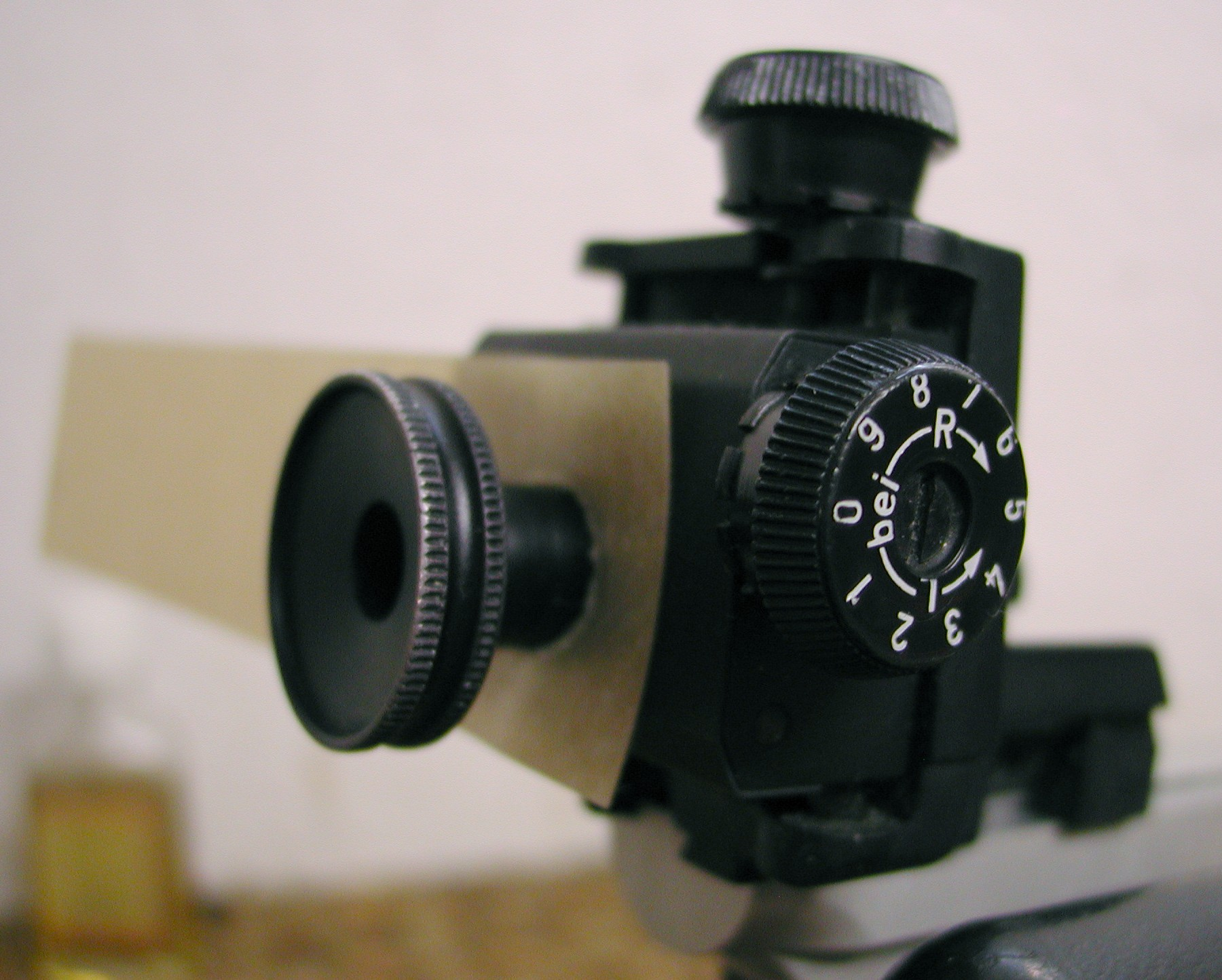
Target shooting diopter of a 10 metre air rifle with a mounted semi-transparent occluder for the non-aiming eye

A diopter sight is an aperture sight component used to assist the aiming of ranged weapons, mainly firearms, airguns, and crossbows. Diopters function to precisely align the shooter's eye with the front sight and the target, while also producing beneficial optical effects for accurate aiming. A diopter must be paired with a complementing front sight element to obtain a usable sighting line. Diopter sights used for modern target shooting allow for very fine windage and elevation adjustments, moving the impact point on the order of less than five millimeters at a range of 100 metres. High end diopters typically accept accessories to aid the shooter's ability to see the target clearly.

Diopters are found in particular as rear sight elements on rifles. Diopter and globe sighting setups are commonly used in ISSF rifle shooting events.

== Diopter rear sight ==
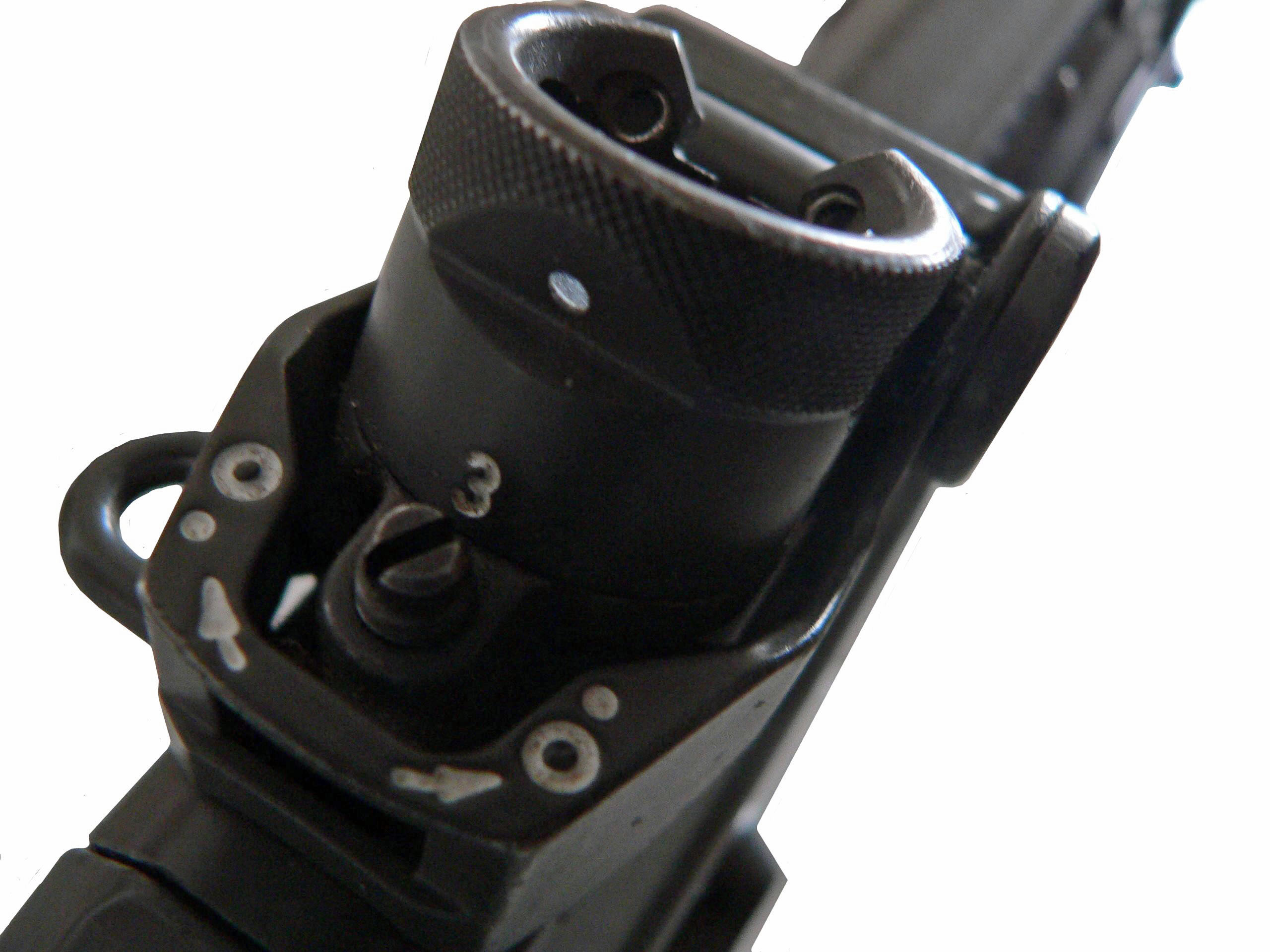
Rear, rotating diopter drum sight of a SIG SG 550 service rifle. The viewing aperture above the "3" (denoting the 300 m setting) can be seen.

The diopter is in principle a vertically and horizontally (elevation and windage) adjustable occluder with a small hole (aperture), and is placed close in front of the shooter's aiming eye. Through this small hole the shooter can view the front sight component(s) and the intended target. The typical occluder used in target shooting diopters is a disc of about 25 mm (0.98 in) in diameter with a small hole in the middle.

The small diopter viewing opening ensures the shooter's eye is very precisely and consistently centered behind the diopter sight. The diopter sight is easy to use and usually allows for very accurate aiming, because a relative long sighting line can be used. A long sighting line helps to reduce eventual angle errors and will, in case the sight has an incremental adjustment mechanism, adjust in smaller increments when compared to a further identical shorter sighting line.

=== Principle ===
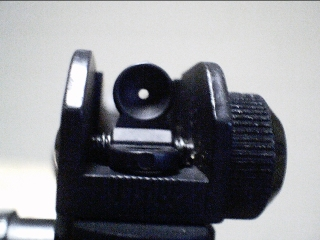
Civilian AR-15 target sights have an aperture between 1 and 1.15 mm (0.039 and 0.045 in). The aperture on AR-15 military sights have a day aperture of approximately 1.78 mm (0.070 in), and the M16A2 also a night setting with a larger 5.08 mm (0.200 in), and as such the military sight is not strictly a diopter sight in either setting.

The "diopter sight effect" is achieved when looking through an aperture opening of approximately 1.2 mm (0.047 in) or less, and happens due to an optical phenomenon (edge effects) resulting in the light passing through being parallelized similar to how a collimated lens would. Because of this optical effect the front sight will also appear more steady, even though the shooter moves the head in a way such that the sighting eye moves sideways relative to the rear sight. Also, the depth of field is increased so that both the sights and shooting target will appear sharp at the same time which further simplifies the aiming process.

The parallax distance of a diopter sight is effectively adjusted to be the same as the sight distance. For example, with a distance of 1 m (1.1 yd) between the front and rear sight, the sighting system is effectively parallax adjusted to a distance of 1 m (1.1 yd) in front of the rear sight. However, since the diopter hole is small, the aiming eye will be relatively well centered, and the parallax error will be relatively small in practice. There will be almost no parallax error if the eye and front globe sight are near perfectly centered through the diopter. In comparison, the parallax error on aperture sights with larger openings can increase quickly if the eye is not well centered in the rear sight. A parallax error of just 1 mm (0.039 in) at 1 m (1.1 yd) corresponds to an impact change of 10 cm (3.9 in) at 100 m (109.4 yd).

A rear sight with a larger aperture than 1.2 mm (0.047 in) is not strictly a diopter sight, but nonetheless is still often (incorrectly) referred to as such. With larger aperture sights the shooter must make a conscious effort to center the eye in the rear sight for precise aiming. A true diopter sight (aperture below 1.2 mm) however has the advantage that the shooter does not have to concentrate on eye and rear sight alignment for precision aiming, and therefore the sighting process is reduced to only aligning the front sight to the target.

Aperture sights (both diopter and non-diopter) require being placed close to the aiming eye, while open sights have to be placed at least 30 cm away from the eye to in order to appear sharp.

=== Modern target sight setups ===
Typical modern target shooting diopters offer windage and elevation correction in increments of 2 to 4 mm (0.079 to 0.157 in) at 100 m (109.36 yd) (which equals 0.02 to 0.04 mrad or ≈ 0.069 to 0.172 MOA). Some ISSF (Olympic) shooting events require this precision level for sight adjustment since the score of the top competitors (last) shots series is expressed in tenths of scoring ring points.

High-end target shooting diopters normally accept accessories like:

- Rubber eye shields to restrain glare.
- Anti-glare tubes.
- Adjustable diopter aperture iris diaphragms (typically offering between 0.5 and 3 mm (0.020 and 0.118 in) diameter apertures) to increase the depth of field and reduce reflections.
- Optical filter systems to increase the contrast sensitivity for the aiming eye.
- Semi-transparent occluders for the non-aiming eye to ensure optimal sighting conditions for match shooters.

== Complementing front sight element ==
The complementing front sight element may be a simple (hooded) bead or post for service arms, but is for target shooting more often a globe type sight, which consists of a hollow cylinder with a threaded cap, which allows interchangeable differently shaped front sight elements to be used. Most common are posts of varying widths and heights or rings or holes of varying diameter — these can be chosen by the shooter for the best fit to the target being used. Tinted transparent plastic insert elements may also be used, with a hole in the middle; these work the same way as an opaque ring, but provide a less obstructed view of the target. High end target front sight tunnels normally also accept accessories like adjustable aperture and optical systems to ensure optimal sighting conditions for match shooters. Some high end target sight line manufacturers also offer front sights with integrated aperture mechanisms.

== Diopter and globe sighting line principle ==
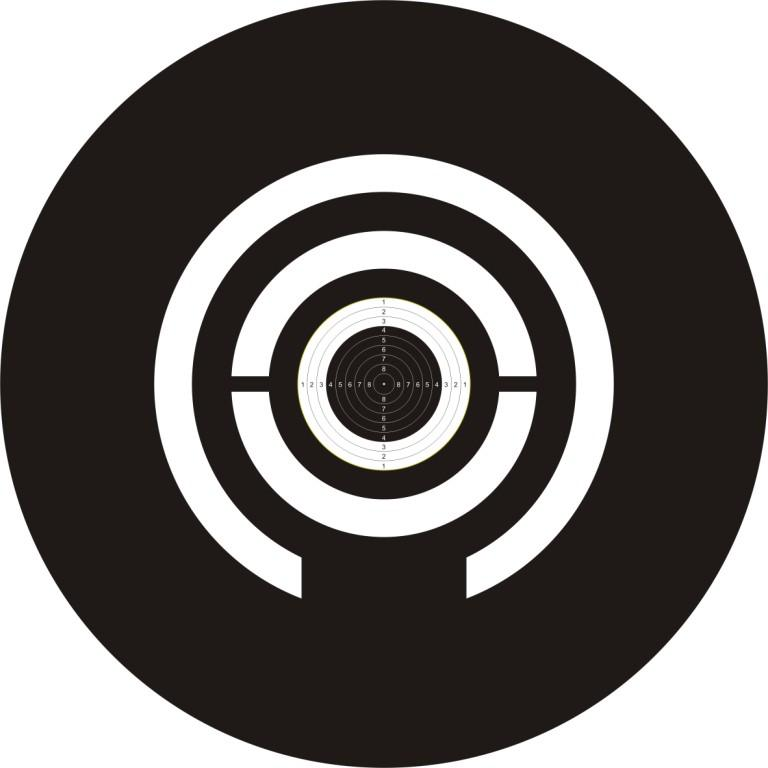
The concentric circle alignment principle is used for precise aiming at round targets

The use of round rear and front sighting elements for aiming at round targets, like used in ISSF match shooting, takes advantage of the natural ability of the eye and brain to easily align concentric circles (circles all having a common centre).

For optimal aiming and comfort the shooter should focus the aiming eye on the front sighting element. To avoid eye fatigue and improve balance the non-aiming eye should be kept open. The non-aiming eye can be blocked from seeing distractions by mounting a semi-transparent occluder to the diopter.

For maximum precision, there should still be a significant area of white visible around the bullseye and between the front and rear sight ring (if a front ring is being used). Since the best key to determining center is the amount of light passing through the apertures, a narrow, dim ring of light can actually be more difficult to work with than a larger, brighter ring.

The precise sizes of the employed components are quite subjective, and depend on both shooter preference and ambient lighting, which is why target rifles come with easily replaceable front sight inserts, and adjustable aperture mechanisms.

== Gallery ==
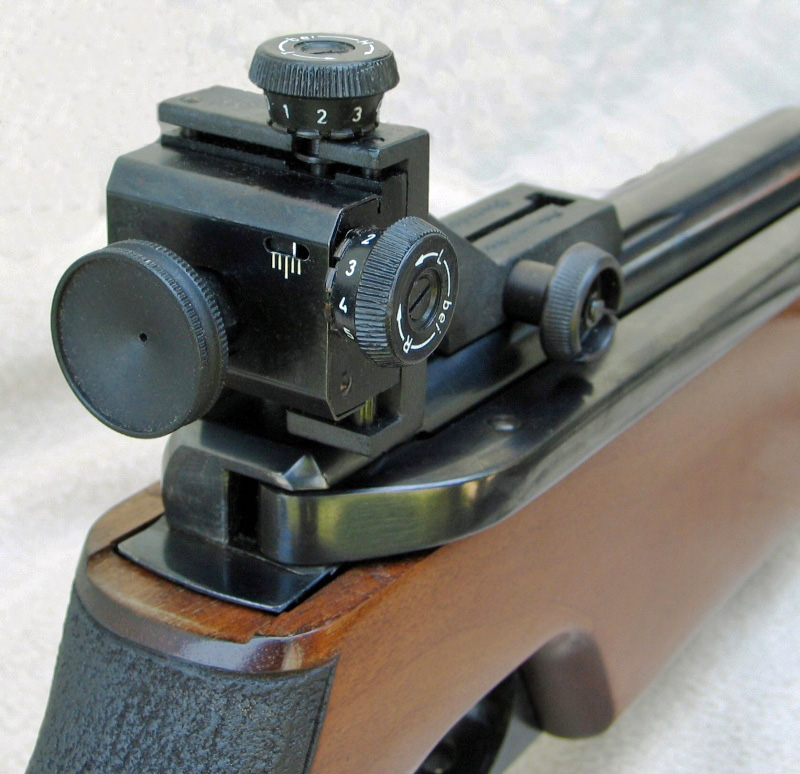
Diopter rear sight on a Feinwerkbau 300S 10 metre target air rifle.

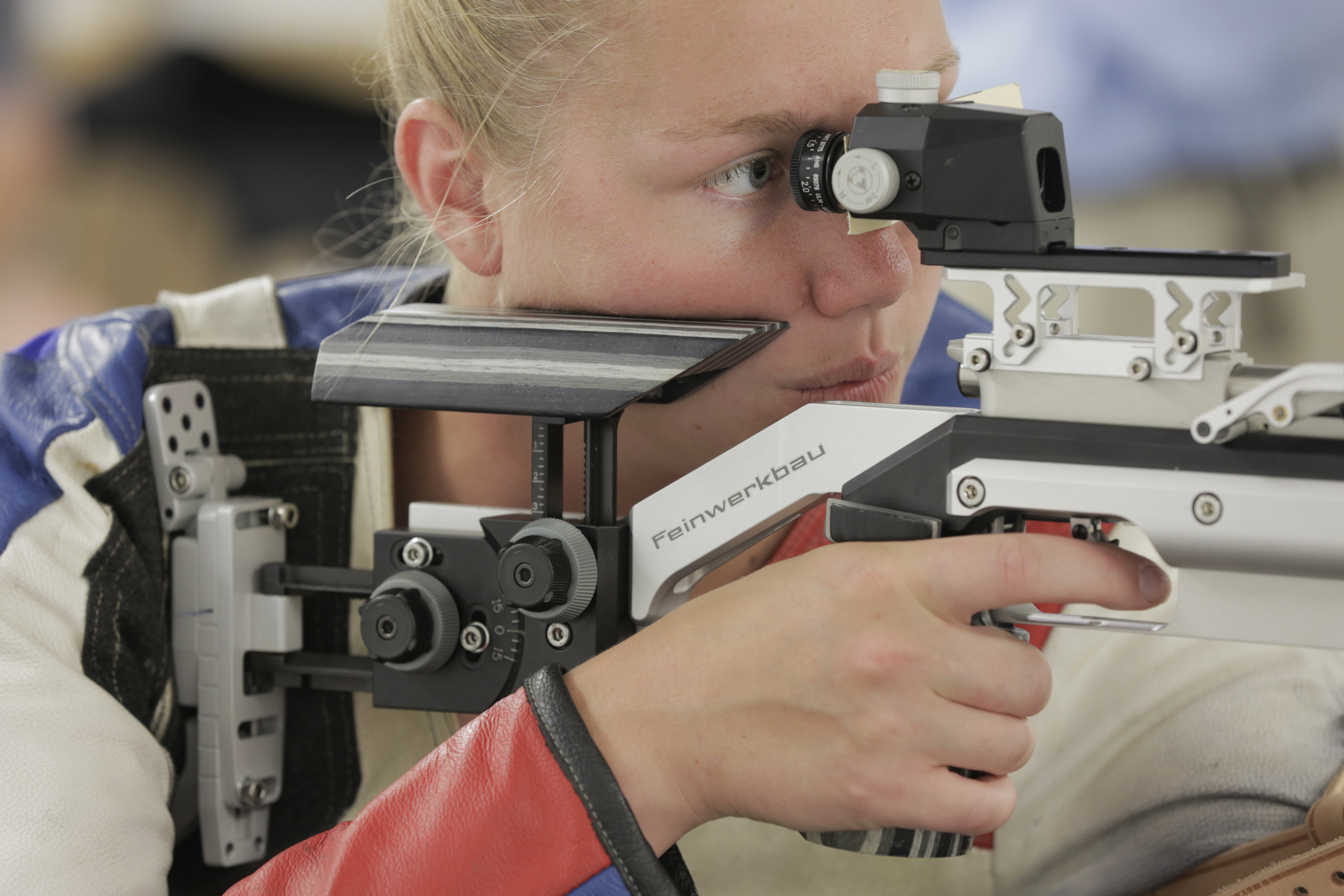
An adjustable aperture system (0.5 to 3.0 mm (0.020 to 0.118 in)) and occluder mounted on a 10 metre air rifle diopter.

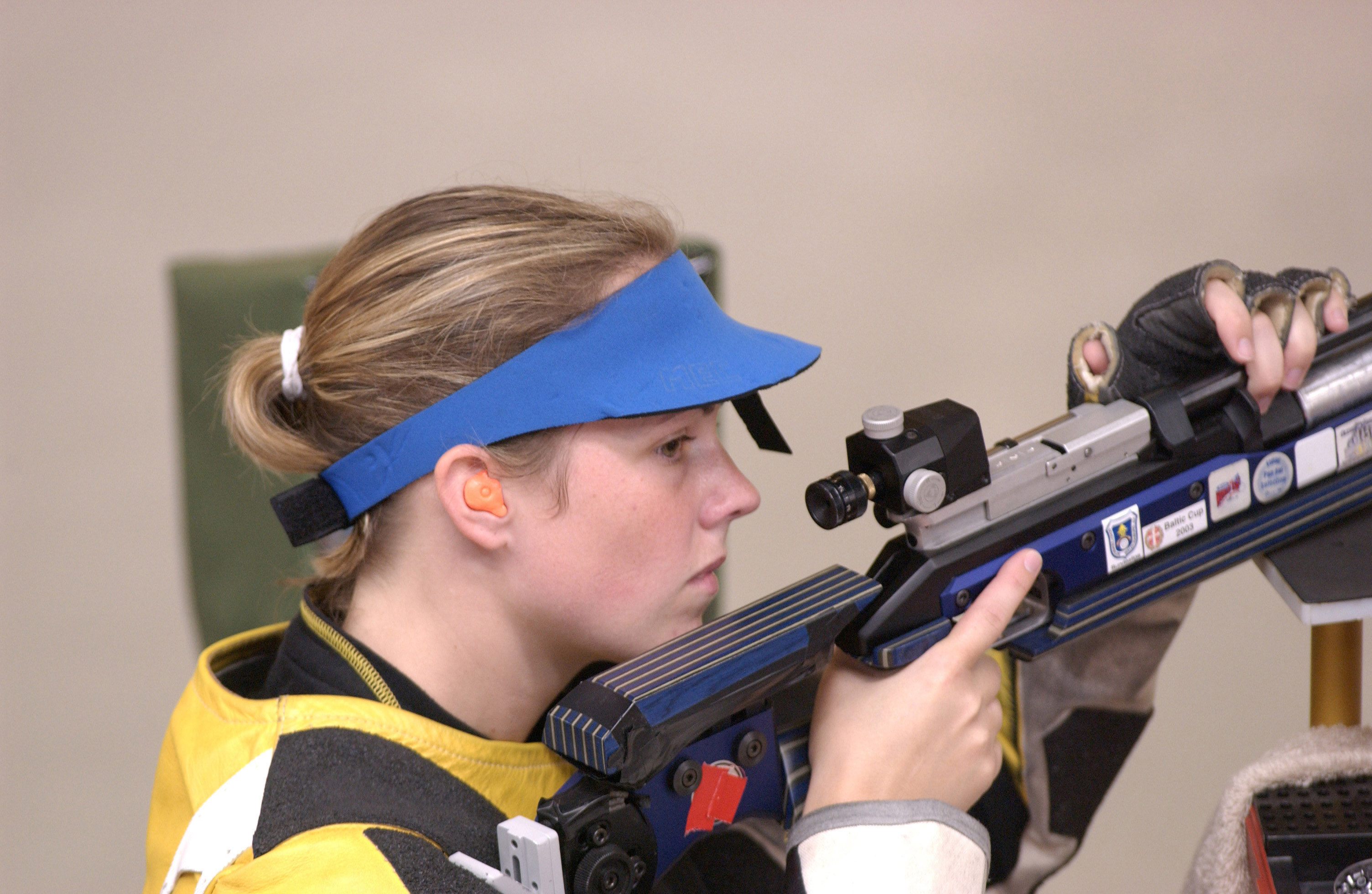
An adjustable diopter aperture and optical filter system as used by Olympic 10 metre air rifle contestant Hattie Johnson.

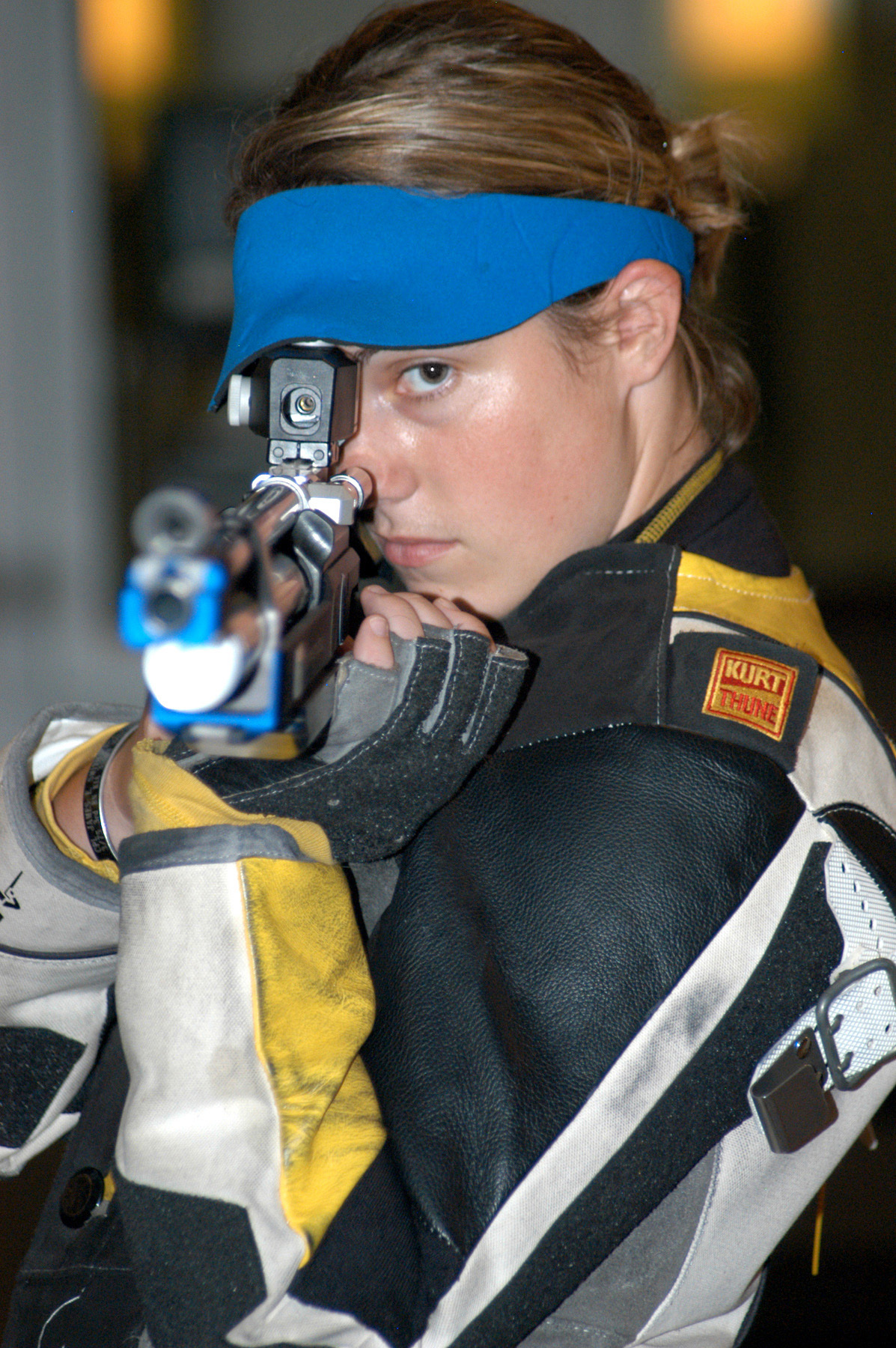
Taking aim through a diopter and globe sighting line.

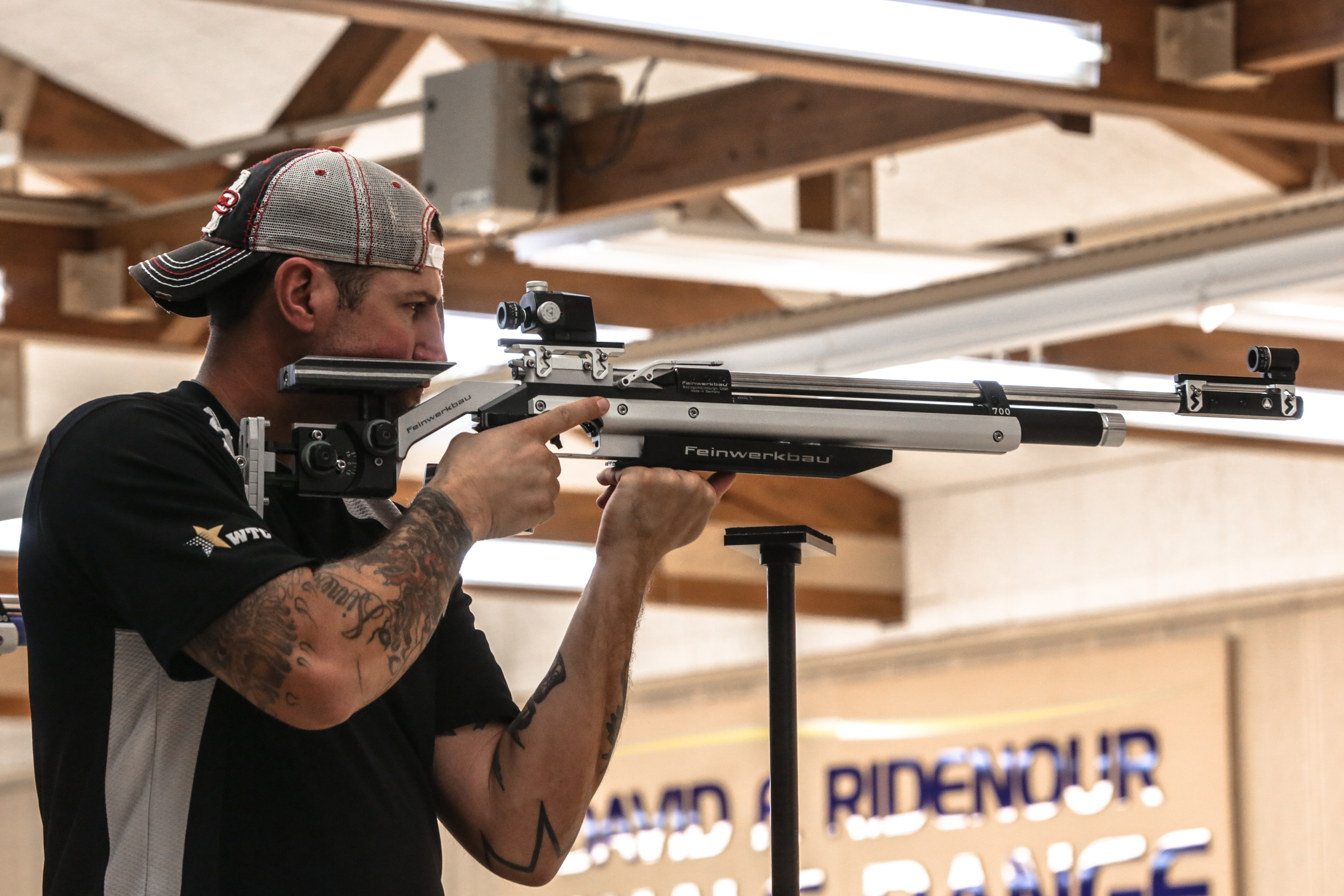
Competitor taking aim through a diopter and globe sighting line on a Feinwerkbau P700 PCP target air rifle at the 2014 Warrior Games.

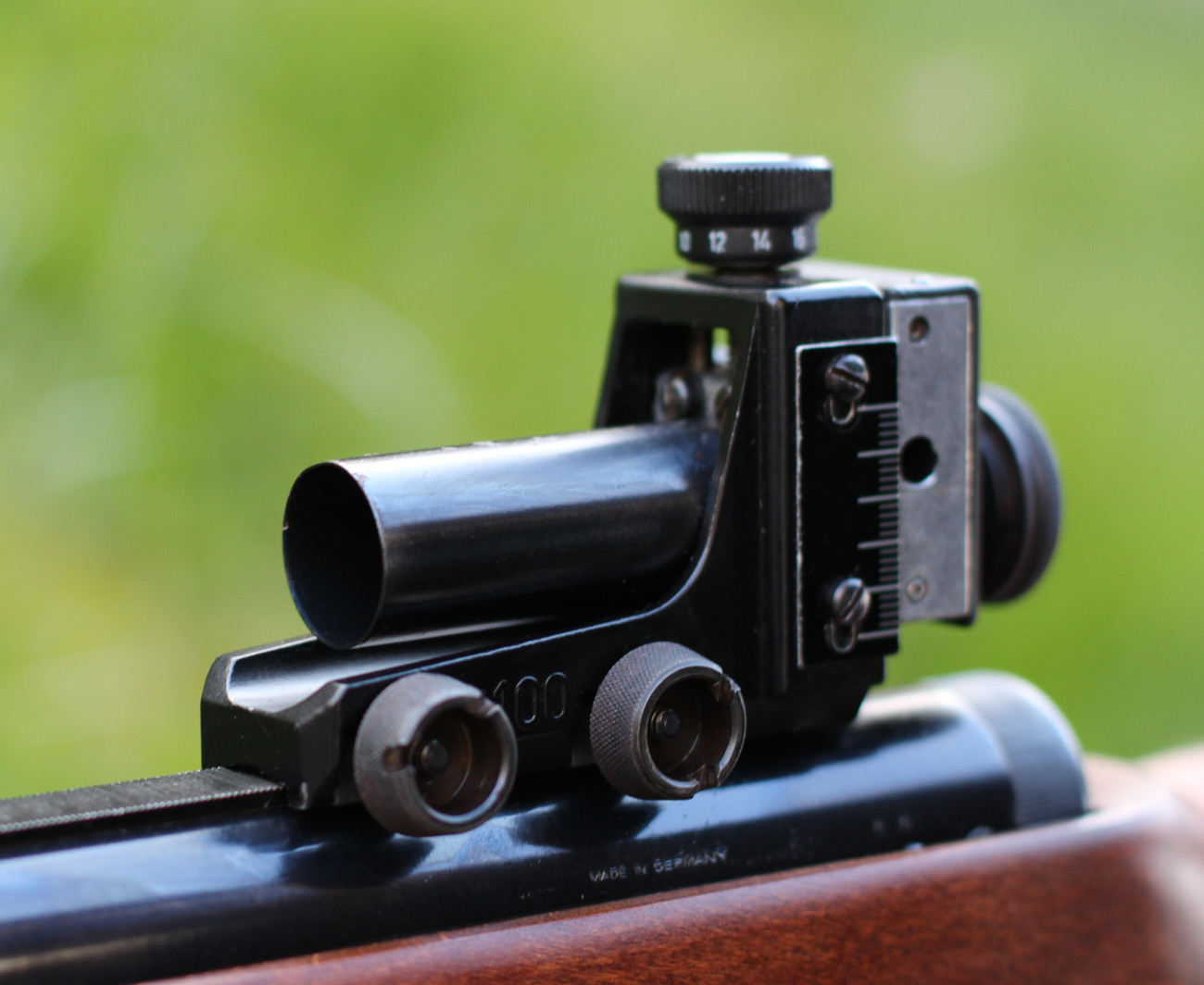
Diana diopter with anti-glare tube.

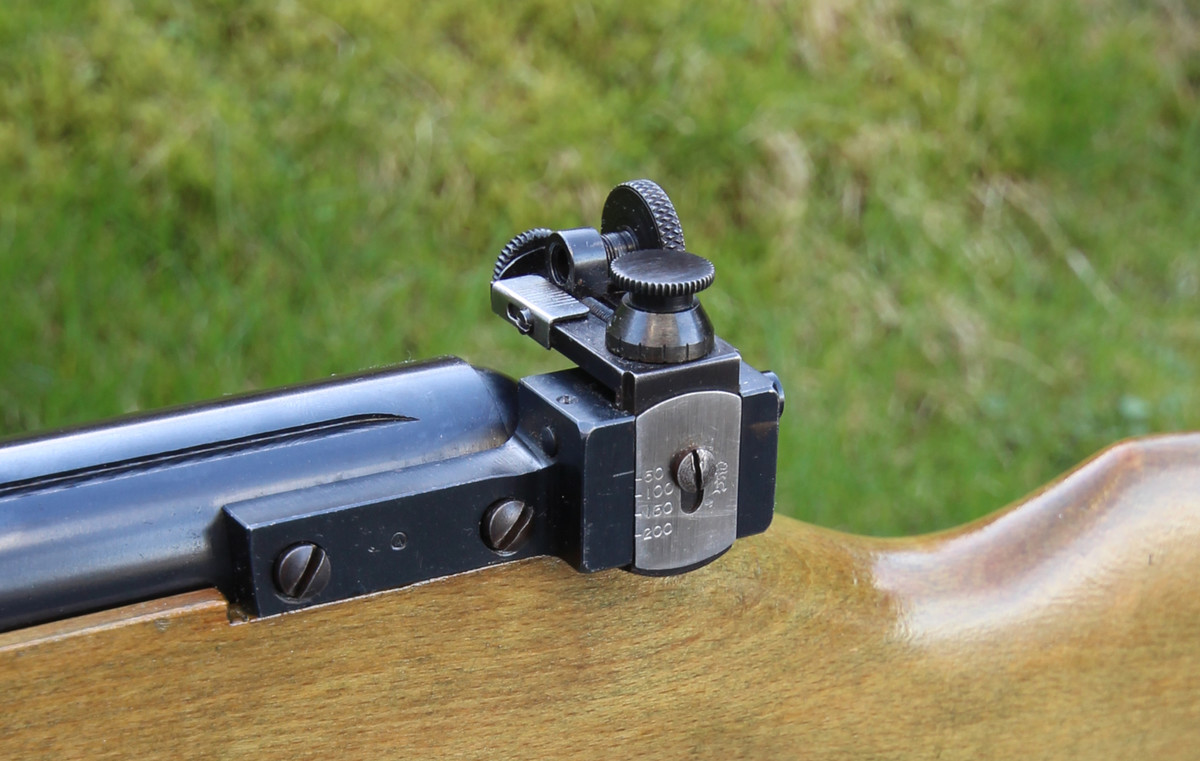
Kongsberg Arms Factory M-51 diopter.

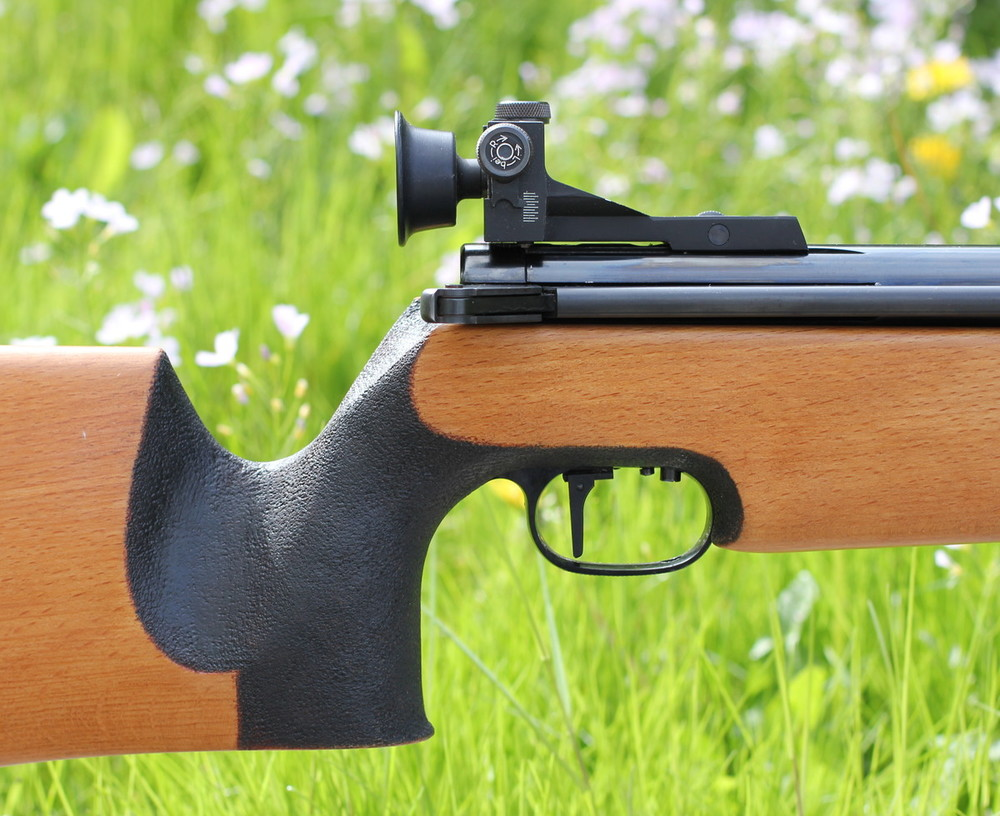
Walther diopter sight with mounted rubber eye shield to restrain glare

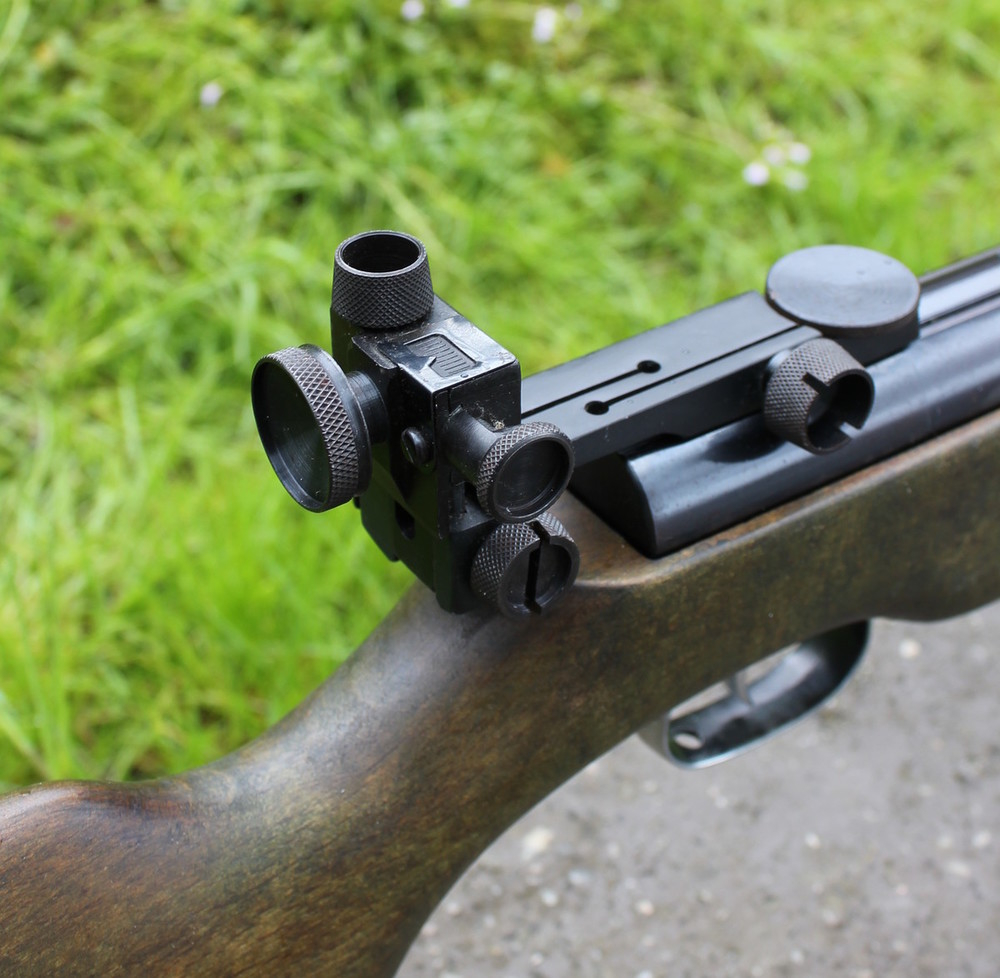
Weihrauch diopter sight
