= Globe sight =

Type of front sight used on firearms

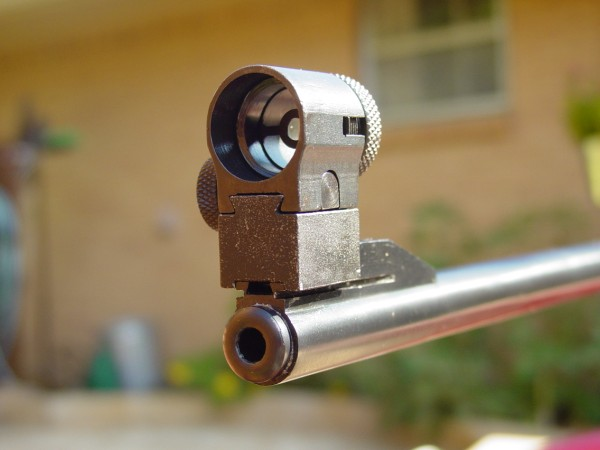
Front globe of a BRNO target sight. Note knurled nut holding in the replaceable front sight insert

A globe sight is a front sight component used to assist the aiming of a gun/device, usually those intended to launch projectiles, such as firearms, airguns, and crossbows. It is found in particular as a front sight element on rifles.

To obtain a usable sighting line, the diopter has to have a complementing rear sight element.

Diopter and globe sighting lines are commonly used in ISSF match rifle shooting events.

== Globe front sight ==
A globe front sight with various types of front sight inserts.

The globe front sight consists of a hollow cylinder with a threaded cap, which allows differently shaped interchangeable front sight elements to be used. Most common are posts of varying widths and heights or rings or holes of varying diameter — these can be chosen by the shooter for the best fit to the target being used. Tinted transparent plastic insert elements may also be used, with a hole in the middle; these work the same way as an opaque ring, but provide a less obstructed view of the target. High-end target front sight tunnels normally also accept accessories like adjustable aperture and optical systems to ensure optimal sighting conditions for match shooters. Some high-end target sight line manufacturers also offer front sights with integrated aperture mechanisms.

== Complementing rear sight element ==
The complementing rear sight element may be an open type iron sight or an aperture sight as used in ghost rings and target aperture sights such as a target shooting diopter sight.

== Diopter and globe sighting line principle ==
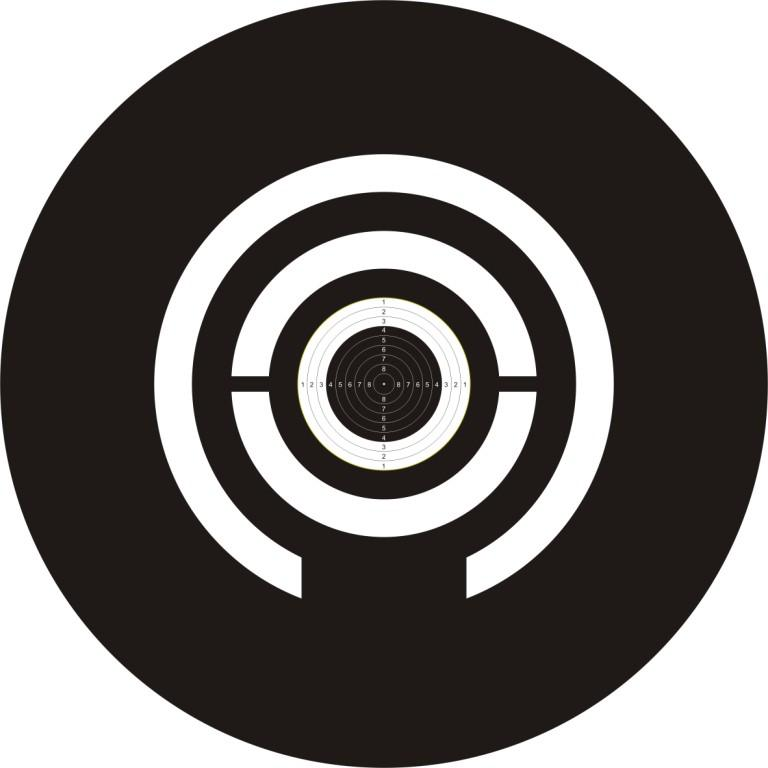
The concentric circle alignment principle is used for precise aiming at round targets

The use of round rear and front sighting elements for aiming at round targets, like used in ISSF match shooting, takes advantage of the natural ability of the eye and brain to easily align concentric circles (circles all having a common centre).

For optimal aiming and comfort, the shooter should focus the aiming eye on the front sighting element. To avoid eye fatigue and improve balance, the non-aiming eye should be kept open. The non-aiming eye can be blocked from seeing distractions by mounting a semi-transparent occluder to the diopter.

Even for the maximum precision, there should still be a significant area of white visible around the bullseye and between the front and rear sight ring (if a front ring is being used). Since the best key to determining center is the amount of light passing through the apertures, a narrow, dim ring of light can actually be more difficult to work with than a larger, brighter ring.

The precise sizes of the employed components are quite subjective, and depend on both shooter preference and ambient lighting, which is why target rifles come with easily replaceable front sight inserts, and adjustable aperture mechanisms.

== Gallery ==
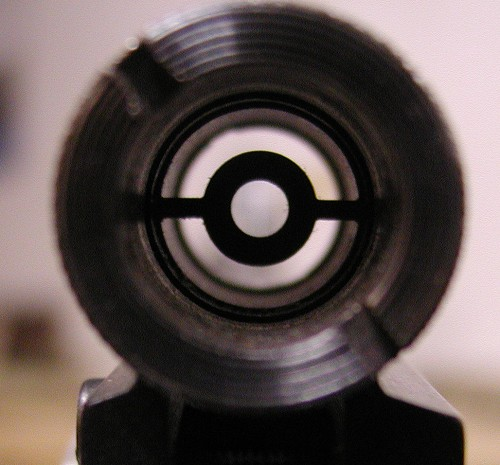
A globe sight of an air rifle with a ring shaped insert element.

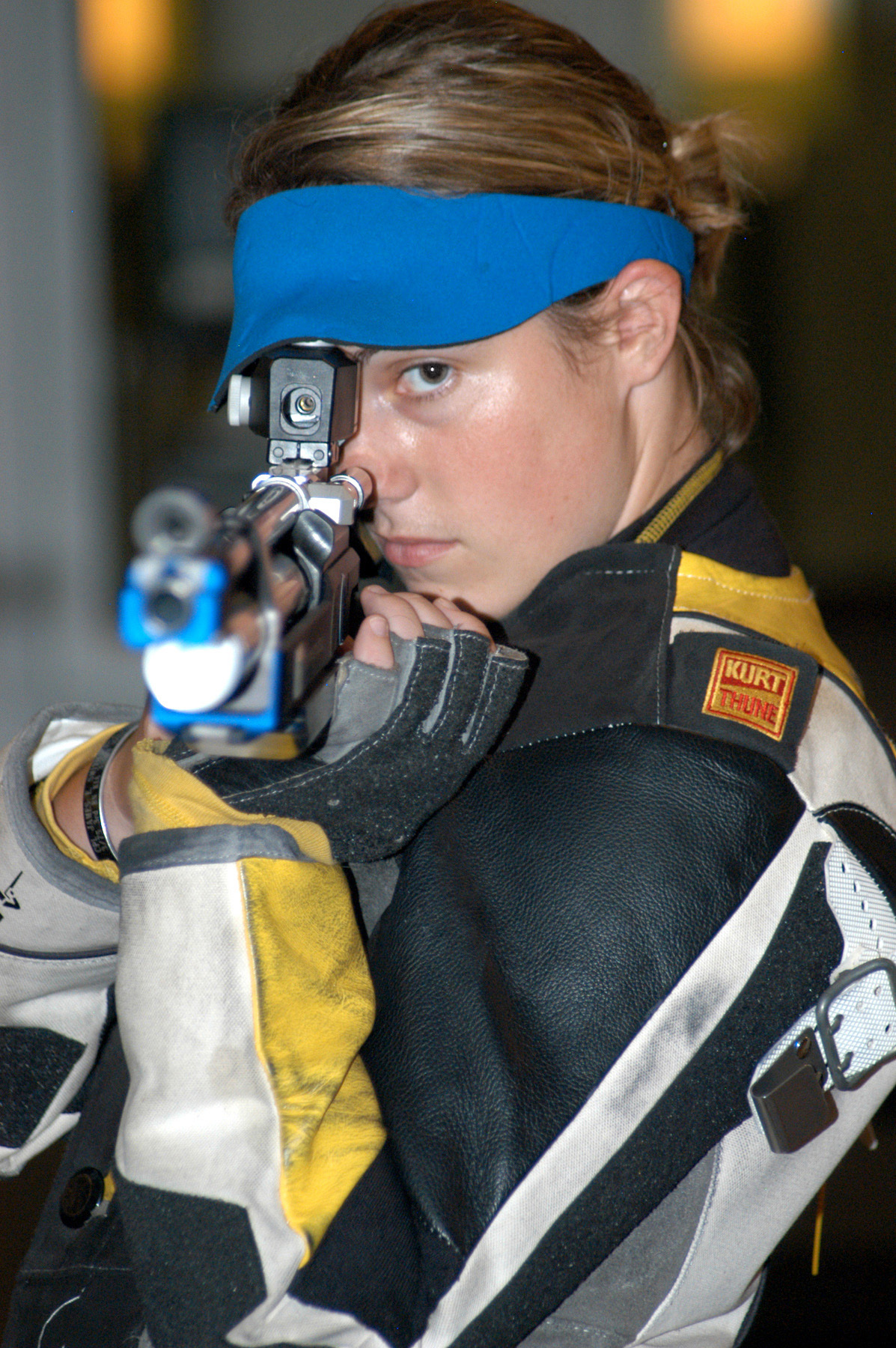
Taking aim through a diopter and globe sighting line.

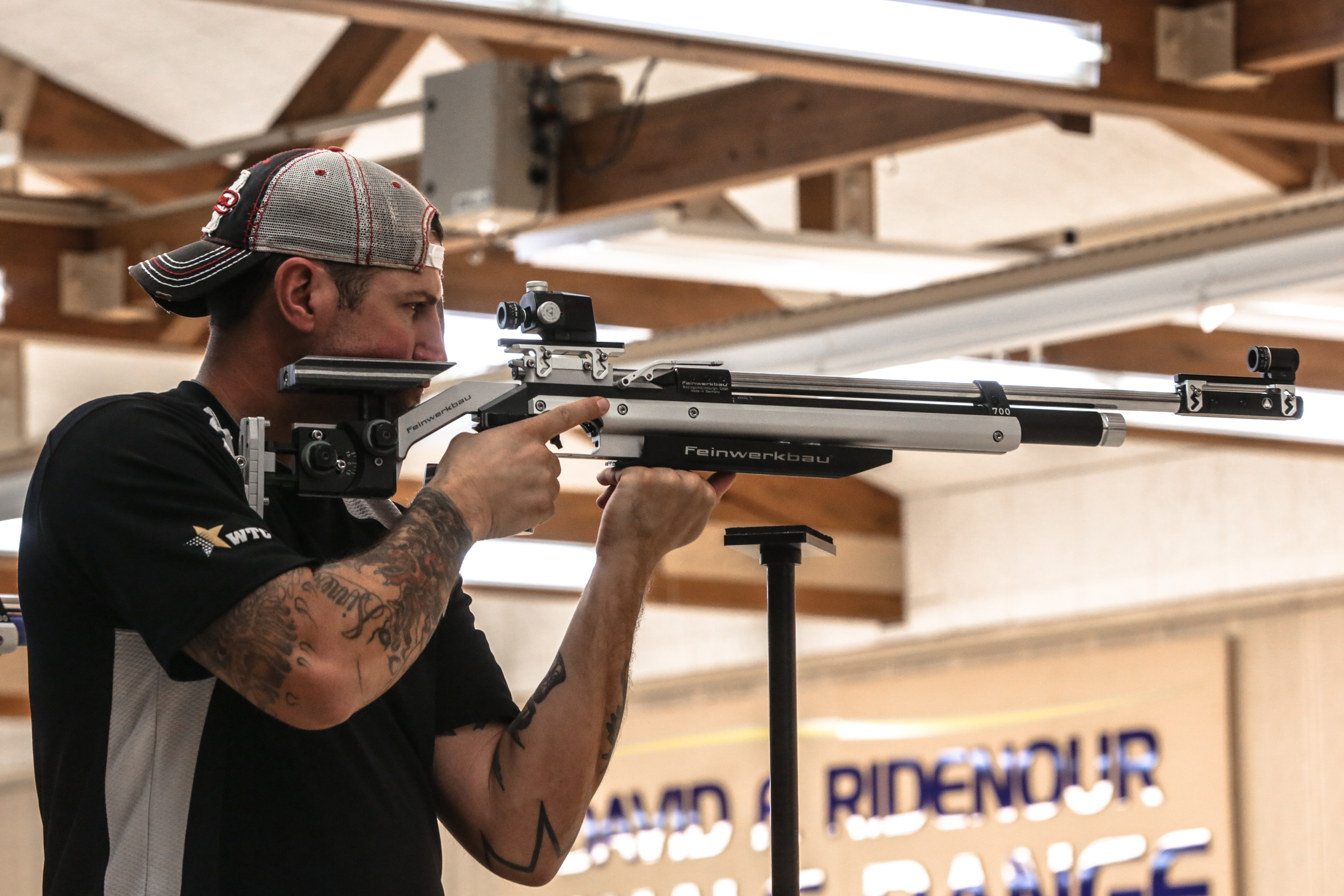
Competitor taking aim through a diopter and globe sighting line at the 2014 Warrior Games.

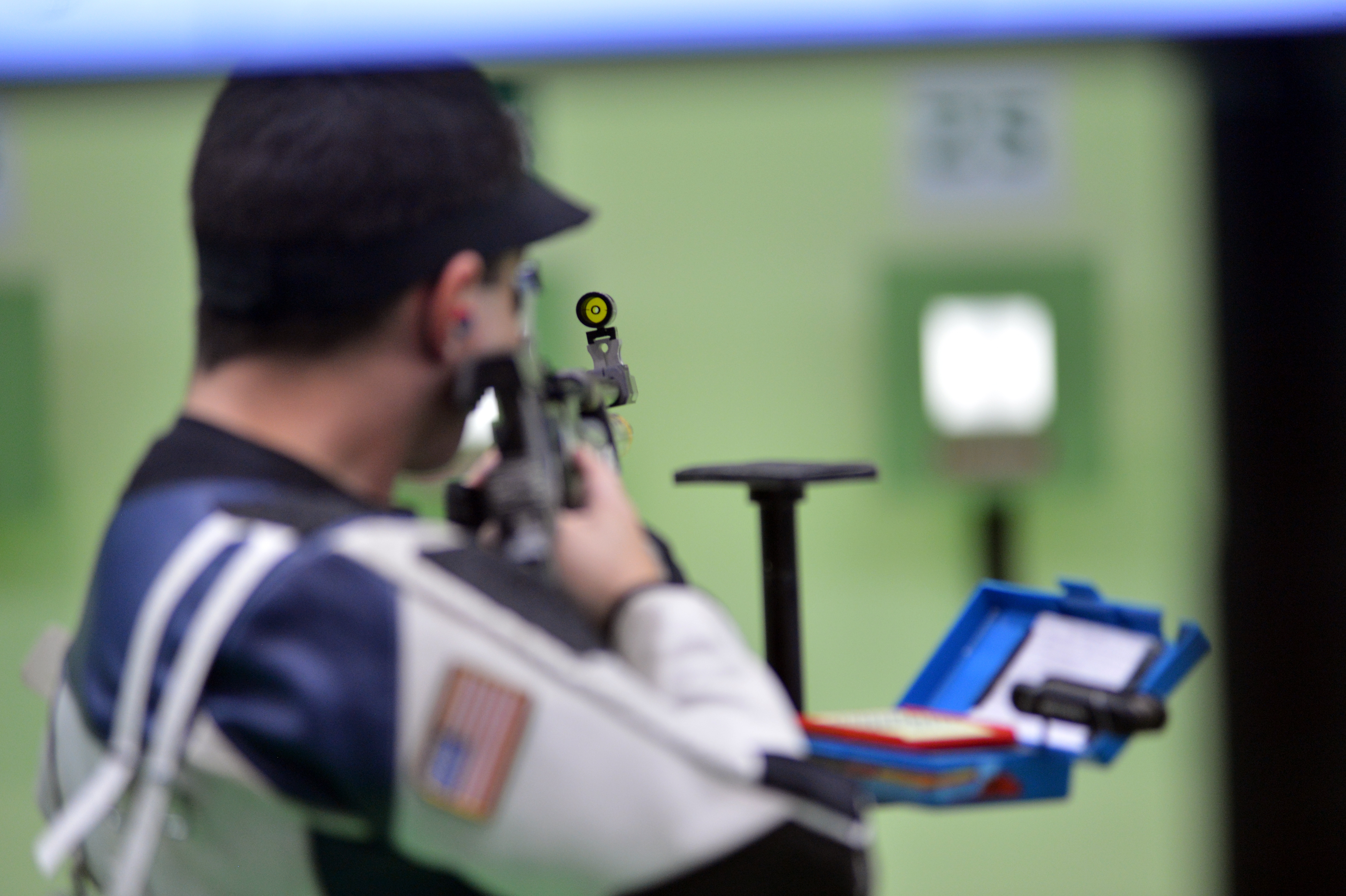
Globe sight used during the 2016 Summer Olympics air rifle competition.
