= All-Russian Institute Of Aviation Materials =

Russian research centre

All-Russian Institute of Aviation Materials
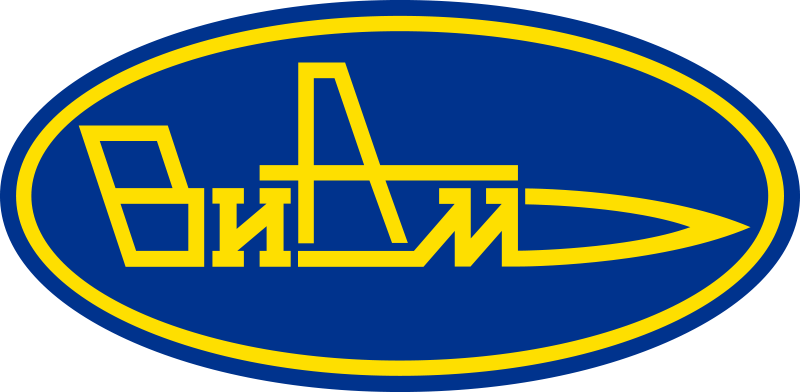

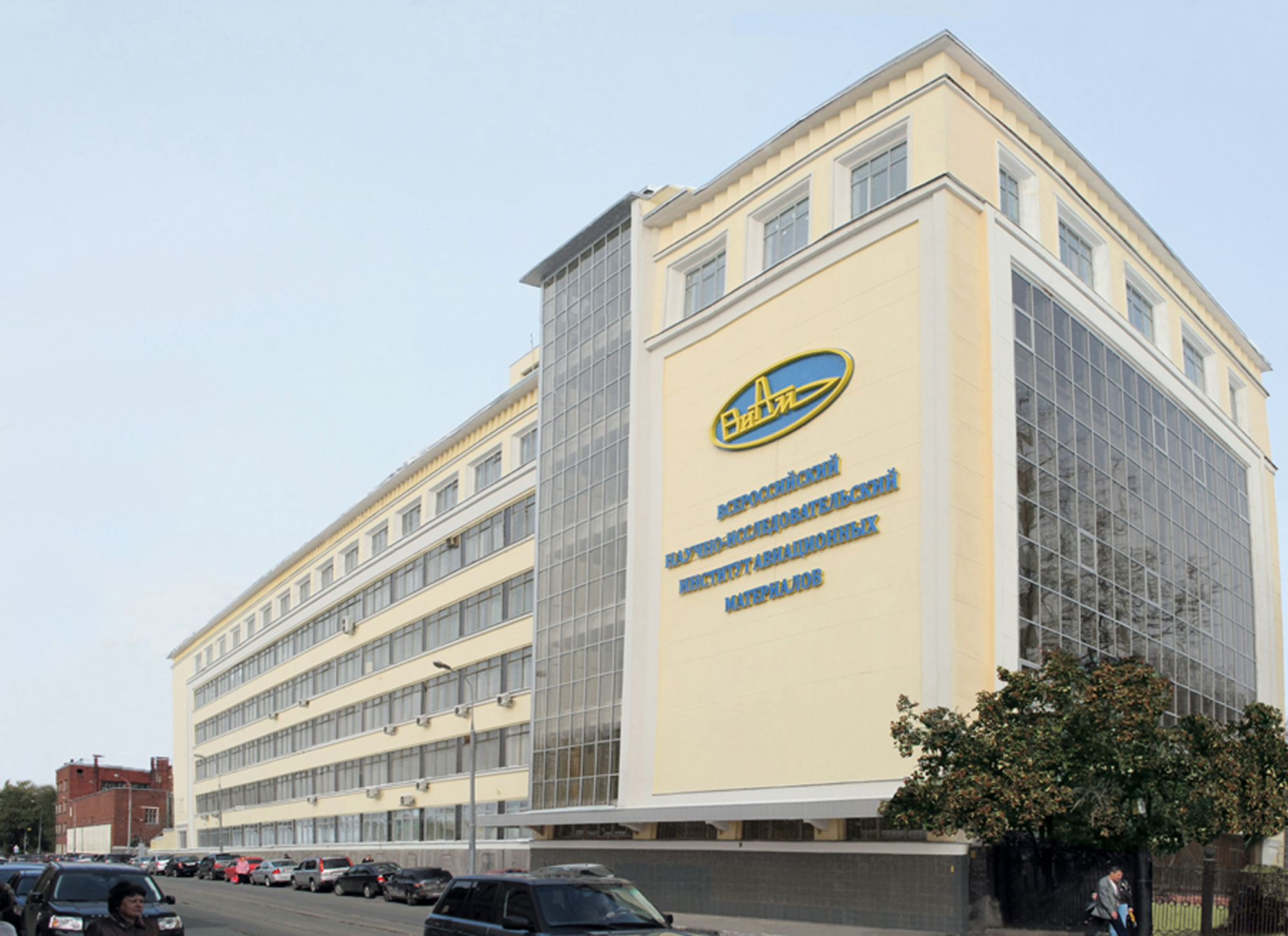
- Native name: Всероссийский научно-исследовательский институт авиационных материалов
- Type: federal state unitary enterprise
- Industry: aerospace
- Founded: 1932; 94 years ago
- Headquarters: Moscow, Russia
- Area served: Europe and Asia
- Key people: Evgeny Kablov, Director General
- Products: industrial materials
- Owner: Russian Federation
- Number of employees: over 1700
- Website: www.viam.ru/en

The All-Russian Institute of Aviation Materials (VIAM; Russian: Всероссийский научно-исследовательский институт авиационных материалов) is a state research centre of the Russian Federation based in Moscow, Russia, established in 1932.

VIAM has broad responsibility for research, development, testing, and certification of all metallic and nonmetallic materials used in the Russian aerospace industry. Over 90 percent of the materials used in Soviet aircraft and space vehicles were developed at VIAM.

== Bibliography ==
- List of VIAM publications in the Scientific electronic library elibrary.ru
