= List of equipment of the Soviet Ground Forces =

Equipment of the Soviet Ground Forces
- Emblem of the Soviet Army
- Founded: 23 February 1946
- Disbanded: 26 December 1991

This list shows equipment of Soviet Ground Forces in 1991.

== Infantry equipment ==
=== Helmets ===
Abbreviation	Type	Photo	Notes
SSh-40	Helmet		Still used during the Soviet-Afghan war.
SSh-60	Helmet		Still used during the Soviet-Afghan war.
SSh-68	Helmet		Main service helmet.

=== Body armor ===
Name	Type	Photo	Notes
6B2 (Zh-RI)	Flak jacket		Issued in 1980, it provided inadequate protection in Afghanistan and subsequently phased out.
6B3	Flak jacket		Replaced the Zh-RI in 1983, it provided better protection, but it was heavier and uncomfortable to wear in the mountains of Afghanistan or in hot days.
YaB4	Flak jacket		Replaced the Zh-RI in 1984, it provided better protection, but it was heavier and uncomfortable to wear in the mountains of Afghanistan or in hot days.
6B4 (Zh-85)	Ballistic vest		Issued between 1985 and 1986, the Zh-85t and Zh-85k provided chest protection against bullets in the front and spinal protection against fragments in the back.
6B5 "Ulej" (Zh-86)	Ballistic vest		Issued in 1988, it replaced the Zh-85t and Zh-85k vests. The Zh-86 covers a larger body area, and its construction uses titanium alloy, ceramics, and special steel.

== Small arms ==
=== Pistols and revolvers ===
Name	Type	Caliber	Photo	Notes
PM	Semi-automatic pistol	9×18mm Makarov		Main service pistol
PB	Integrallly suppressed semi-automatic pistol	9×18mm Makarov		Silenced pistol issued to special forces
APS	Machine pistol	9×18mm Makarov		
PSM	Semi-automatic pistol	5.45×18mm		Standard sidearm of civil and military security forces
PSS	Semi-automatic pistol	7.62×41mm SP-4		Used by Spetsnaz.
Tokarev TT-33	Semi-automatic pistol	7.62×25mm Tokarev		Limited use.
Nagant M1895	Revolver	7.62×38mmR		Limited use.

=== Semi-automatic and bolt-action rifles ===
Name	Type	Caliber	Photo	Notes
SKS	Semi-automatic rifle	7.62×39mm		Ceremonial use The SKS carbine remained in the Soviet Army until the very end and is still used by the post-Soviet countries today.

=== Assault rifles and other automatic rifles ===
Name	Type	Caliber	Photo	Notes
AK-74	Assault rifle	5.45×39mm		Main service rifle
AKS-74	Assault rifle	5.45×39mm		AK-74 variant with a folding stock
AKS-74U	Assault Carbine	5.45×39mm		AKS-74 variant with a shortened barrel
AKM	Assault rifle	7.62×39mm		In service since 1959
AKMS	Assault rifle	7.62×39mm		AKM variant with a folding stock

=== Designated marksman and sniper rifles ===
Name	Type	Caliber	Photo	Notes
SVD	Designated marksman rifle	7.62×54mmR		Main service designated marksman rifle
VSS Vintorez	Designated marksman rifle	9×39mm		Suppressed sniper rifle used by special forces like Spetsnaz

=== Light and heavy machine guns ===
Name	Type	Caliber	Photo	Notes
RPD	Light machine gun	7.62×39mm		Was succeeded in Soviet service by the RPK.
RPK	Light machine gun	7.62×39mm		
RPK-74	Light machine gun	5.45×39mm		Main service light machine gun
PKM	General-purpose machine gun	7.62×54mmR		Main service general-purpose machine gun
NSV "Utyos"	Heavy machine gun	12.7×108mm		Main service heavy machine gun
DShKM	Heavy machine gun	12.7×108mm		Being replaced by the NSV machine gun.
KPV-14.5	Heavy machine gun	14.5×114mm		Base for anti-aircraft guns.

=== Flares and smokes ===
Name	Type	Caliber	Photo	Notes
SPSh-44	Flare gun	26 mm		
RSP-30	Warning flare			
RDG-2	Smoke grenade			

=== Launchers ===
Name	Type	Caliber	Photo	Notes
GP-25 Kostyor	Grenade launcher	40 mm caseless grenade		
AGS-17 Plamya	Automatic grenade launcher	30x29 mm		

=== Rocket-propelled grenade launchers ===
Name	Type	Caliber	Photo	Notes
RPG-29 Vampir	Reusable high-explosive anti-tank rocket-propelled grenade	105mm		
RPG-27 Tavolga	Disposable high-explosive anti-tank rocket-propelled grenade	105mm		
RPG-26 Aglen	Disposable high-explosive anti-tank rocket-propelled grenade	72.5mm		
RPG-22 Netto	Disposable high-explosive anti-tank rocket-propelled grenade	72.5mm		Seen in use during the Soviet-Afghan war.
RPG-18 Mukha	Disposable high-explosive anti-tank rocket-propelled grenade	64mm		
RPG-16	Rocket-propelled grenade	58.3mm		Used by paratroopers and Spetsnaz.
RPG-7	Rocket-propelled grenade	40mm		Reusable launcher with various types of anti-personnel and anti-tank munitions.

=== Recoilless rifles ===
Name	Type	Caliber	Photo	Notes
SPG-9 Kopyo	Recoilless rifle	73 mm		
B-10	Recoilless rifle	82 mm		Limited use by paratroopers.

=== Man-portable air-defense systems ===
Name	Type	Caliber	Photo	Notes
9K32 Strela-2	Infrared homing	72 mm		NATO reporting name: SA-7 Grail. Being replaced by the Strela-3 and Igla systems
9K34 Strela-3	Infrared homing	72 mm		NATO reporting name: SA-14 Gremlin
9K310 Igla-1	Infrared homing	72 mm		NATO Reporting name: SA-16
9K38 Igla	Infrared homing	72 mm		NATO reporting name: SA-18. Replacing the Strela-2 and Strela-3 systems.

=== Anti-tank guided missiles ===
Name	Type	Caliber	Photo	Notes
9M17 Fleyta	MCLOS	148 mm		NATO reporting name: AT-2 Swatter
9M14 Malyutka	MCLOS	125 mm		NATO reporting name: AT-3 Sagger
9K111 Fagot	SACLOS	120 mm		NATO reporting name: AT-4 Spigot
9M113 Konkurs	SACLOS	135 mm		NATO reporting name: AT-5 Spandrel
9K114 Shturm	SACLOS			NATO reporting name: AT-6 Spiral
9K115 Metis	SACLOS	94 mm		NATO reporting name: AT-7 Saxhorn
9K112 Kobra	SACLOS	125 mm		NATO reporting name: AT-8 Songster.
9M117 Bastion	Laser beam-riding	100 mm		NATO reporting name: AT-10 Stabber.
9M119 Svir/Refleks	Laser beam-riding	120 mm		NATO reporting name: AT-11 Sniper.

=== Land mines ===
Name	Type	Caliber	Photo	Notes
MON-50	Anti-personnel	700 g RDX		Widely used in the Soviet-Afghan war.
MON-90	Anti-personnel	6.2 kg RDX		
MON-100	Anti-personnel	2 kg TNT		
MON-200	Anti-personnel	12 kg TNT		
OZM-72	Anti-personnel	660 g TNT		Widely used in the Soviet-Afghan war.
PFM-1	Anti-personnel	37 g		
PMD-6 mine	Anti-personnel	200 g		PMD-7, and PMD-7ts variants also used.
POMZ-2M	Anti-personnel	75 g TNT		
PMN mine	Anti-personnel	240 g TNT		Widely used in the Soviet-Afghan war.

=== Anti-tank mines ===
Name	Type	Caliber	Photo	Notes
TMD-44	Anti-tank mine	9.7 kg Amatol		
TM-46	Anti-tank mine	5.7 kg TNT		
TM-57	Anti-tank mine	6.34 kg TNT		
TM-62	Anti-tank mine	7.5 kg TNT		
TM-72	Anti-tank mine	2.5 kg HEAT		
PDM-1	Amphibious anti-tank	10 kg TNT		
TM-83	Off-route mine	6.6 kg TNT		

=== Flamethrower ===
Name	Type	Caliber	Photo	Notes
LPO-50	Flamethrower	986 mm		
RPO Rys	Flamethrower	122 mm		
RPO-A Shmel	Flamethrower	93 mm		

=== Mortars ===
Name	Type	Caliber	Photo	Notes
82-BM-37	Light	82mm		M-37M
2B14 Podnos	Light	82mm		Used by paratroopers.
120-PM-38	Heavy	120 mm		
120-PM-43	Heavy	120 mm		
2B11	Heavy	120 mm		
2S12 Sani	Heavy	120 mm		1,387 units in 1991
M-160	Heavy	160mm		
M-240	Heavy	240 mm		

=== Hand grenades ===
Name	Type	Photo	Caliber	Notes
F1	Anti-personnel		55 mm	
RGD-5	Anti-personnel		58 mm	
RGN	Anti-personnel		60 mm	Offensive type hand grenade.
RGO	Anti-personnel		60 mm	Defensive type hand grenade.
RKG-3	Anti-tank grenade		362 mm	
RPG-6	Anti-tank grenade		103 mm	Still used for training purposes.
RPG-43	Anti-tank grenade		95 mm	Still used for training purposes.
VOG-25	Launcher grenade		40 mm	Used on the GP-25.

== Vehicles ==
=== Tanks ===
The International Institute for Strategic Studies estimated that the Soviet Union had around 16,000 tanks of unknown types in storage east of the Urals in 1991.

Name	Type	Quantity	Photo	Notes
T-80	Main battle tank	5,400		T-80U/T-80BV
T-72	Main battle tank	9,000		T-72B
T-64	Main battle tank	4,900		T-64BV
T-62	Main battle tank	8,500		T-62MV-1
T-55	Main battle tank	10,600		T-55AMV-1
T-10	Heavy tank	~350		T-10M
PT-76	Light tank	1,000		PT-76B

=== Infantry fighting vehicles ===
The Soviet Union had about 28,000 Infantry fighting vehicles in 1991

Name	Type	Quantity	Photo	Notes
BMP-1	Infantry fighting vehicle	N/A		Between 1972 and 1988 Czechoslovakia delivered 5,100 BVP-1s to the Soviet Union
BMP-2	Infantry fighting vehicle	N/A		
BMP-3	Infantry fighting vehicle	~700		
BMD-1	Infantry fighting vehicle	~3,000		Used by airborne troops.
BMD-2	Infantry fighting vehicle	~3,000		Used by airborne troops.
BMD-3	Infantry fighting vehicle	~3,000		Only used by airborne troops.

=== Self-propelled guns ===
Name	Type	Quantity	Photo	Notes
ASU-57	Assault gun			Only used by airborne troops.
ASU-85	Assault gun			Only used by airborne troops.
2S1 Gvozdika	Self-propelled artillery	2,331		
2S3 Akatsiya	Self-propelled artillery	2,044		
2S4 Tyulpan	Self-propelled mortar	54		
2S5 Giatsint-S	Self-propelled artillery	494		
2S7 Pion	Self-propelled artillery	304		
2S9 Nona	Self-propelled artillery	442		Only used by airborne troops.
2S19 Msta	Self-propelled howitzer	13		
152 mm SpGH DANA	Self-propelled artillery			150 delivered by Czechoslovakia between 1986 and 1990.

=== Towed mortars and anti-tank guns ===
Name	Type	Quantity	Photo	Caliber	Notes
2B9 Vasilek	Gun howitzer			82 mm	Used by motor rifle and airborne units.
D-44	Anti-tank gun			85 mm	
BS-3	Anti-tank gun			100 mm	
T-12	Anti-tank gun			100 mm	
2B16 Nona-K	Gun howitzer	37		120 mm	
2A45 Sprut-A	Anti-tank gun			125 mm	

=== Towed artillery ===
Name	Type	Quantity	Photo	Caliber	Notes
2A18 D-30	Field gun	2,044		122 mm	
D-74	Field gun			122 mm	
KS-30	Field gun	12		130 mm	
D-20	Field gun	767		152 mm	
2A36 Giatsint-B	Field gun	574		152 mm	
2A65 Msta-B	Field gun	400		152 mm	
S-23	Field gun	~180		180 mm	

=== Anti-aircraft tanks and missile systems ===
Name	Type	Quantity	Photo	Notes
ZSU-57-2	Self-propelled anti-aircraft gun	750		In reserve.
ZSU-23-4 Shilka	Self-propelled anti-aircraft gun	N/A		
2K11 Krug	Transportable SAM system	1,350		NATO reporting name: SA-4 Ganef. Being replaced by the Buk and S-300 systems
2K12 Kub	Transportable SAM system	850		NATO reporting name: SA-6 Gainful
2K22 Tunguska	Self-propelled anti-aircraft gun	130		NATO reporting name: SA-19 Grison
9K31 Strela-1	Transportable SAM system	430		NATO reporting name: SA-9 Gaskin. Being replaced by the Strela-10 system
9K33 Osa	Transportable SAM system	950		NATO reporting name: SA-8 Gecko
9K35 Strela-10	Transportable SAM system	860		NATO reporting name: SA-13 Gopher
9K37 Buk	Transportable SAM system	300		NATO reporting name: SA-11 Gadfly
9K330 Tor	Transportable SAM system	20		NATO reporting name: SA-15 Gauntlet. Replacing the Kub and Osa systems
S-300	Transportable SAM system	70+		NATO Reporting name: SA-12A Gladiator

=== Anti-aircraft guns ===
Name	Type	Quantity	Photo	Caliber	Notes
AZP S-60	Autocannon			57 mm	
ZU-23-2	Autocannon			23x152 mmB	
ZPU-2	Anti-aircraft gun			14.5x114 mm	In reserve.
KS-30	Anti-aircraft gun			130x845 mmR	In reserve.
KS-19	Anti-aircraft gun			100x695 mm	

=== Rocket artillery ===
Name	Type	Quantity	Photo	Notes
BM-14	Multiple rocket launcher			
BM-21 Grad	Multiple rocket launcher	1,550		
BM-24	Multiple rocket launcher			
BM-27 Uragan	Multiple rocket launcher	554		
9K58 BM-30 Smerch	Multiple rocket launcher	158		
TOS-1	Multiple rocket launcher			First used in 1987 during the Soviet-Afghan war.

=== Tactical ballistic missiles ===
Name	Type	Quantity	Photo	Notes
9K52 Luna-M	Tactical ballistic missile	500		
9K79 OTR-21 Tochka	Tactical ballistic missile	300		
RT-17 Scud	Tactical ballistic missile	550		Scud-B and Scud-C variants

=== Armored personnel carriers ===
By 1991 the Soviet army had over 50,000 armored personnel carriers in service.

Name	Type	Quantity	Photo	Notes
BTR-80	Armoured personnel carrier	N/A		
BTR-70	Armoured personnel carrier	N/A		
BTR-60	Armoured personnel carrier	N/A		BTR-60P
BTR-50	Armoured personnel carrier	N/A		BTR-50P
BTR-152	Armoured personnel carrier	N/A		Some vehicles were kept by 1980s as ambulances, command, radio, and engineering vehicles.
BTR-D	Armoured personnel carrier	N/A		Used by airborne units.
MT-LB	Tracked Armoured personnel carrier	4,500		
PTS-2	Amphibious armoured personnel carrier			
PTS-M	Amphibious armoured personnel carrier			

=== Reconnaissance vehicles ===
Soviet army had about 8,000 reconnaissance vehicles in service in 1991.

Name	Type	Quantity	Photo	Notes
BRDM-2	Amphibious armoured scout car	3,500		
BRM-1K	Reconnaissance tank			
IRM Zhuk	Engineer reconnaissance tank		framele ss	

=== Engineering vehicles ===
Name	Type	Quantity	Photo	Notes
BAT-2	Military engineering vehicle	N/A		
BTM-3	Trencher	N/A		
IMR-2	Military engineering vehicle	N/A		
MDK-3	Trencher	N/A		
MTU-20	Bridgelayer	N/A		
TMK-2	Trencher	N/A		
TMM	Bridgelayer	N/A		
PMP Floating Bridge	Pontoon bridge	N/A		

=== Unarmored trucks and utility vehicles ===
Name	Type	Quantity	Photo	Notes
UAZ-469	Light utility vehicle	N/A		
Lada Niva Legende	Light utility vehicle	N/A		
GAZ-67	Light utility vehicle	N/A		
GAZ-69	Light utility vehicle	N/A		
UAZ-452	Light truck	N/A		Used mostly as ambulances or special operation vehicles.
GAZ-53	Medium truck	N/A		Used by engineering units in Afghanistan.
GAZ-66	Medium truck	N/A		The GAZ-66B variant was used by Airborne troops.
ZIL-131	Medium truck	N/A		Some had ZU-23 anti-aircraft guns mounted in Afghanistan.
