= List of Second Chechen War military equipment =

The weapons, vehicles and equipment used in the Second Chechen War, from 1999 to 2009 include the following. The war primarily involved the Armed Forces of the Chechen Republic of Ichkeria and the Armed Forces of Russia.

== Russian forces ==
=== Individual Equipment ===
Model	Image	Type	Origin	Details
Uniform equipment
Flora camouflage		Camouflage pattern	Russia	Former standard issue camo pattern for the Russian armed forces.
SSh-68		Combat helmet	Soviet Union	Former standard issue helmet for the Russian armed forces.
6B7 helmet		Combat helmet	Russia	Adopted in the year 2000 as part of Borit-M program.
Stahlhelm		Combat helmet	Germany	Captured off of Chechen forces.
6B23 ballistic vest		Bulletproof vest	Russia	Former standard issue bulletproof vest for the Russian armed forces.

=== Optics and night vision ===
Model	Image	Type	Origin	Details
Optics and night vision
PSO-1		Telescopic sight	Soviet Union	Issued alongside the Dragunov.

=== Small arms ===
Model	Image	Type	Origin	Details
Sidearms
MP-443 Grach		Semi-automatic pistol	Russia	Service pistol adopted in 2003 to replace the aging Makarov PM for frontline units.
GSh-18		Semi-automatic pistol	Russia	Service pistol adopted to replace the aging Makarov PM.
Makarov pistol		Semi-automatic pistol	Soviet Union	
Stetchkin APS		Machine pistol	Soviet Union	Issued to vehicle crews and pilots.
Submachine guns
PP-19 Bizon		Submachine gun	Russia	
Shotguns
KS-23		Shotgun	Soviet Union	
Carbines
AKS-74U		Carbine	Soviet Union	
Assault rifles
AKM		Assault rifle	Soviet Union	
AKMS		Assault rifle	Soviet Union	
AK-74		Assault rifle	Soviet Union	
AK-74M		Assault rifle	Russia	Standard issue rifle.
AS Val		Suppressed Assault rifle	Soviet Union	
AEK-971		Assault rifle	Soviet Union	
Precision rifles
Dragunov SVD		Designated marksman rifle	Soviet Union	Main service designated marksman rifle.
SV-98		Bolt action Sniper rifle	Russia	
Dragunov SVU		Bullpup Designated marksman rifle	Russia	
VSK-94		Sniper rifle	Russia	
VSS Vintorez		Sniper rifle	Soviet Union	
Anti-materiel rifles
ASVK		Bullpup Anti-materiel rifle	Russia	
Machine guns
RPK-74		Light machine gun	Soviet Union	
RPK-74M		Light machine gun	Russia	Standard issue light machine gun.
PK		General-purpose machine gun	Soviet Union	
PKM		General-purpose machine gun	Soviet Union	
PKP		General-purpose machine gun	Russia	
DSHK		Heavy machine gun	Soviet Union	
KPV		Heavy machine gun	Soviet Union	

=== Explosives ===
Model	Image	Type	Origin	Details
Grenades
RGD-5		Hand grenade	Soviet Union	
Grenade launchers
GP-25/34		Underslung grenade launcher	Soviet Union	Can be fitted to AKM, AK-74 and AN-94 rifles.
GM-94		Pump action grenade launcher	Russia	Used by special forces in the 2005 Nalchik raid
RG-6 grenade launcher		Multi-shot grenade launcher	Russia	
AGS-17 Plamya		Automatic grenade launcher	Soviet Union	
AGS-30 Atlant		Automatic grenade launcher	Russia	
Rocket launchers and recoilless rifles
RPG-7		Rocket-propelled grenade	Soviet Union	
RPG-18 Mukha		Rocket-propelled grenade	Soviet Union	
RPO-A Shmel		Missile launcher	Soviet Union	
MRO-A		Rocket-propelled grenade	Russia	
ATGMs
9K111 Fagot		Anti-tank weapon	Soviet Union	
Anti-personnel mines
PMN-3		Anti-personnel mine	Soviet Union	
Mortars
2S12 Sani		Mortar	Soviet Union	

=== Air Defense ===
Model	Image	Type	Origin	Details
MANPADS
9K32 Strela-2		MANPADS	Soviet Union	
9K38 Igla		MANPADS	Soviet Union	
Anti-aircraft guns
ZU-23-2		Anti-aircraft gun	Soviet Union	
ZPU-1		Anti-aircraft gun	Soviet Union	
ZPU-2		Anti-aircraft gun	Soviet Union	

=== Vehicles ===
Model	Image	Type	Origin	Details
Tanks
T-62		Main battle tank	Soviet Union	
T-72		Main battle tank	Soviet Union	
Infantry fighting vehicles
BMP-1		Infantry fighting vehicle	Soviet Union	
BMP-2		Infantry fighting vehicle	Soviet Union	
BMP-3		Infantry fighting vehicle	Soviet Union	
BTR-80A		Infantry fighting vehicle	Soviet Union	
BTR-82A		Infantry fighting vehicle/Armored personnel carrier	Soviet Union	
Armored personnel carriers
MT-LB		Armored personnel carrier	Soviet Union	
BTR-60		Armored personnel carrier	Soviet Union	
BTR-80		Armored personnel carrier	Soviet Union	
Self-propelled mortars
2S4 Tyulpan		Mortar carrier	Soviet Union	
Self-propelled artillery
2S1 Gvozdika		Self-propelled artillery	Soviet Union	
2S3 Akatsiya		Self-propelled artillery	Soviet Union	
2S19 Msta-S		Self-propelled artillery	Soviet Union	
2S7 Pion		Self-propelled artillery	Soviet Union	
2S7M Malka		Self-propelled artillery	Soviet Union	
Rocket artillery
BM-21 Grad		Rocket artillery	Soviet Union	
BM-27 Uragan		Rocket artillery	Soviet Union	
BM-30 Smerch		Rocket artillery	Soviet Union	
TOS-1A Solntsepyok		Rocket artillery	Soviet Union	
Air defense platforms
ZSU-23-4 Shilka		SPAA	Soviet Union	

=== Aircraft ===
Model	Image	Type	Origin	Details
Fixed-wings
Sukhoi Su-24		Tactical bomber	Soviet Union	
Sukhoi Su-25		Attack aircraft	Soviet Union	
Helicopters
Kamov Ka-50		Attack helicopter	Russia	
Mil Mi-8		Transport helicopter	Soviet Union	
Mil Mi-24/35		Attack helicopter	Soviet Union	
Mil Mi-26		Heavy lift transport helicopter	Soviet Union	

=== Ordnance ===
Model	Image	Type	Origin	Details
Surface-to-surface missiles
OTR-21 Tochka		Tactical ballistic missile	Soviet Union	

== Chechen forces ==
=== Small arms ===
Model	Image	Type	Origin	Details
Pistols
Makarov pistol		Semi-automatic pistol	Soviet Union	
Walther P38		Semi-automatic pistol	Germany	Primarily used by officers.
Submachine guns
Borz		Submachine gun	Chechen Republic of Ichkeria	Umbrella term applied to improvised submachine guns made throughout both wars.
Assault rifles
AK-74		Assault rifle	Soviet Union	
AK-74M		Assault rifle	Russia	
AKS-74		Assault rifle	Soviet Union	
AS Val		Assault rifle	Soviet Union	
AKM		Assault rifle	Soviet Union	
AK-47		Assault rifle	Soviet Union	
Precision rifles
Dragunov SVD		Designated marksman rifle	Soviet Union	
Bolt action rifles
Mosin–Nagant		Bolt-action rifle	Soviet Union	

=== Explosives ===
Model	Image	Type	Origin	Details
Rocket launchers and recoilless rifles
RPG-7		Rocket-propelled grenade	Soviet Union	
RPG-18 Mukha		Rocket-propelled grenade	Soviet Union	

=== Air defense ===
Model	Image	Type	Origin	Details
MANPADS
9K38 Igla		MANPADS	Soviet Union	
9K32 Strela-2		MANPADS	Soviet Union	
FIM-92 Stinger		MANPADS	United States	

== Notes ==
- Several images shown are either not from the time period of the second Chechen war (1999-2011), or from nations that are not involved in the conflict.

== See also ==
Ground Forces

- List of equipment of the Russian Ground Forces

Air Forces

- List of active Russian Air Force aircraft
