= Zabralo ballistic vests =

Russian ballistic vest

"Zabralo"
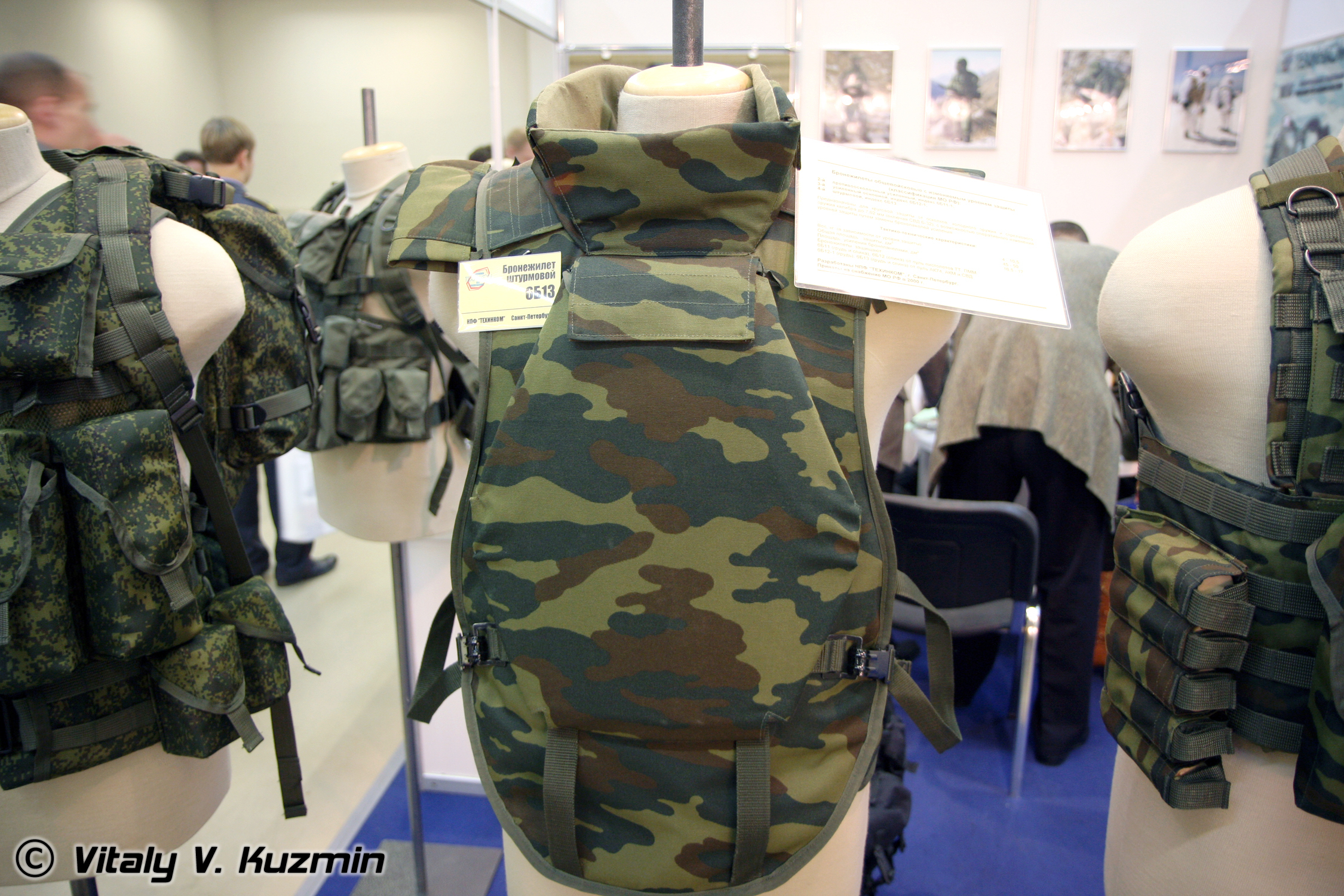
- 6B13 Assault vest at Interpolitex 2008 exhibition
- Type: Ballistic vest
- Place of origin: Russian Federation

Service history
- In service: 1999-present
- Used by: Russian Armed Forces
- Wars: Second Chechen War; Russo-Georgian War; Russo-Ukrainian War

Production history
- Manufacturer: Kirasa, Techinkom, NII Stali, Armokom, NPP KlASS, Artess
- Produced: 1999-2003 (6B11,6B12); 1999-? (6B13)

Specifications
- Weight: 5-11 kg depending on variant

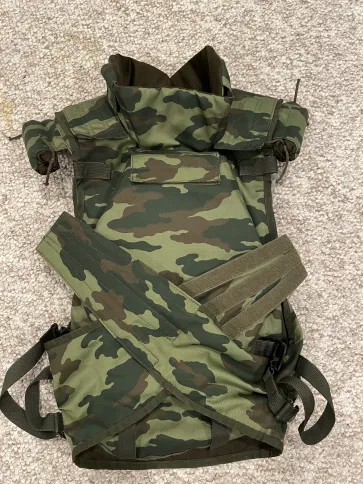
6B13 assault vest in "flora" camouflage pattern.

"Zabralo" (6B11, 6B12, 6B13) (Russian: "Забрало", lit. 'Visor') is a series of ballistic vests created for the Russian Armed Forces under the supervision of GRAU for inclusion in the basic set of personal equipment "Barmitsa". They were intended as a replacement for the Soviet ballistic vests 6B3, 6B4 and 6B5. The Zabralo armors were a major advance for Russian armor development due to their design.

== History ==
In the aftermath of the dissolution of the Soviet Union, development of personal protective equipment for the troops entered a hiatus. Many of the former enterprises involved in armor development were at risk of bankruptcy. With the growth of the organized crime in Russia, ballistic vests came to be in demand from both the Mafia and the crime fighting organizations like MVD. As a result, some of the Soviet research institutes and design bureaus managed to survive. They who became the support of the Russian military-industrial complex after the country began to emerge from the crisis.

"Zabralo" ballistic vests were created by 1999 to be a part of basic set of personal equipment "Barmitsa", a program predecessor of Ratnik. They were created as a replacement for the 6B3, 6B4 and 6B5 vests. The vests are very similar to each other, differing mostly in the ballistic plates used. Unlike the Soviet vests, the same 6B11, 6B12, 6B13 were produced by several companies at once, which is why they differ in appearance, accessories, and markings. The main reason for the creation of the “Zabralo” series was the need for compact, universal armor protection, over which modern chest rig systems could be worn.

By the beginning of 2000s, the production numbers of the new vests were not sufficient to replace older armor and the number of different vests in service with the Russian Armed Forces was quickly increasing. In addition to more than a dozen different variants of Soviet vests still in use, new Zabralo armors by multiple different manufacturers were now in the supply chain. The new 6B23 ballistic vest was developed to replace older models.

6B23 replaced 6B11 and 6B12 vests (as well as previous Soviet armors), but not the assault variant, 6B13. As of 2014, 6B13 armor was still being produced for the Russian Armed Forces.

== Design ==
The different modifications of the vest are in three main categories: Light variants for artillery crews, logistics personnel, etc. (flak vests), assault variants for short-term special combat missions, and general purpose vests for the mainline combat personnel of the Armed forces.

Zabralo armors consist of the following vests:

- 6B11 - Light variant. Produced by Kirasa. Fabric (Aramid) only variants without plates.
  - 6B11-1 - Produced by Techinkom.
  - 6B11-2 - Produced by NII Stali.
  - 6B11-3 - Produced by ZAO Artess. Was withdrawn from service due to corruption scandal.
- 6B12 - General purpose variant. Produced by Kirasa. Steel 6.5 mm plate on the front.
  - 6B12-1 - Produced by Techinkom and Armokom. Ceramic plate on the front.
  - 6B12-2 - Produced by NII Stali. 9.5 mm titanium plate or 5.6 mm steel plate on the front.
  - 6B12-3 - Produced by ZAO Artess. Was withdrawn from service due to corruption scandal.
  - 6B12-4 - Produced by NPP KIASS. Steel 6.5 mm plate on the front.
  - 6B12M - Produced by Kirasa. With armor elements made of “44C” steel of increased strength.
- 6B13 - Assault variant. Produced by Techinkom. Ceramic plates on the front and back.
  - 6B13M - Produced by Techinkom. Version with MOLLE webbing.

=== Specialised 6B17 and 6B18 vests ===
These vests are sometimes also included in Zabralo armors. They are non-standard body armor - for supernumerary (instead of standard) provision of certain categories of military personnel.

6B17 was designed for protection against pistol rounds and shrapnel for military personnel performing patrol tasks, guarding commandant's offices and headquarters, escorting cargo in urban environments. Weighs 5 kg.

6B18 was designed for command officers (from regiment commander and above) and has same protection as 6B17. Weighs 4.6 kg.

== Corruption scandal ==
From 1999 to 2005, ZAO Artess produced and supplied 14,000 ballistic vests (among them 6B11-3, 6B17, 6B18, 6B24), to the Russian Armed Forces for 203 million roubles. The vests were purchased by Valery Znahurko, head of the supply department of the GRAU of the Ministry of Defense. Vests were mostly supplied to the North Caucasus Military District.

Soon after, military personnel began to complain about the low quality of the vests, for example, the fabric of bulletproof vests quickly tore. The people subordinate to General Znakhurko were also dissatisfied with the vests; they were surprised by the discrepancy between the price and quality of the products. Zahurko claimed that armored vests were tested before being delivered to the troops. Every 500th bulletproof vest from the batch was sent by the supplier to a military proving ground, where the product was shot from TT and Makarov pistols, and then bombarded with shrapnel balls simulating the explosion of a "suicide bomber’s belt".

Znahurko showed intact samples, only slightly scratched by bullets, to his superiors and subordinates.

However, in 2005, investigators from the then-Chief Military Prosecutor's Office decided to conduct independent tests of body armor. Instead of taking demonstration samples brought from the company, they took already purchased vests by the Ministry of Defense. The tests showed the fraud: this time both the ball bearings (shrapnel simulators) and the bullets pierced the armor straight through. As a result, all 14,000 vests supplied were declared unusable and were confiscated from warehouses. As the investigation discovered, contrary to the claims, vests were not made in Samara, but in Tula sewing workshops. The producer saved on almost everything. Manufacturers put only 22 layers of material into the body armor instead of the 25-30 declared according to the technical specifications. At the same time, the price was hiked. For example, the 6B24 commander's body armor prime cost was 21 thousand rubles. The Ministry of Defense bought it for 30 thousand.

Valery Znahurko was removed from his post and later left military. Tatiana Romanova, the head of Artess department with whom Znahurko made business with also left the company. They were both charged with stealing and General Znahurko was also charged with abuse of power. The damage caused to the budget by their actions amounts to 203 million rubles. This was the total cost of body armor purchased by the Ministry of Defense. While 110 million of this amount was spent on the production of body armor, an additional 93 million was stolen.

General Znahurko and Tatiana Romanova were sentenced to 4 years in prison.

== Users ==
- Russia

=== Partially-recognized states ===
- Donetsk People's Republic

== Gallery ==
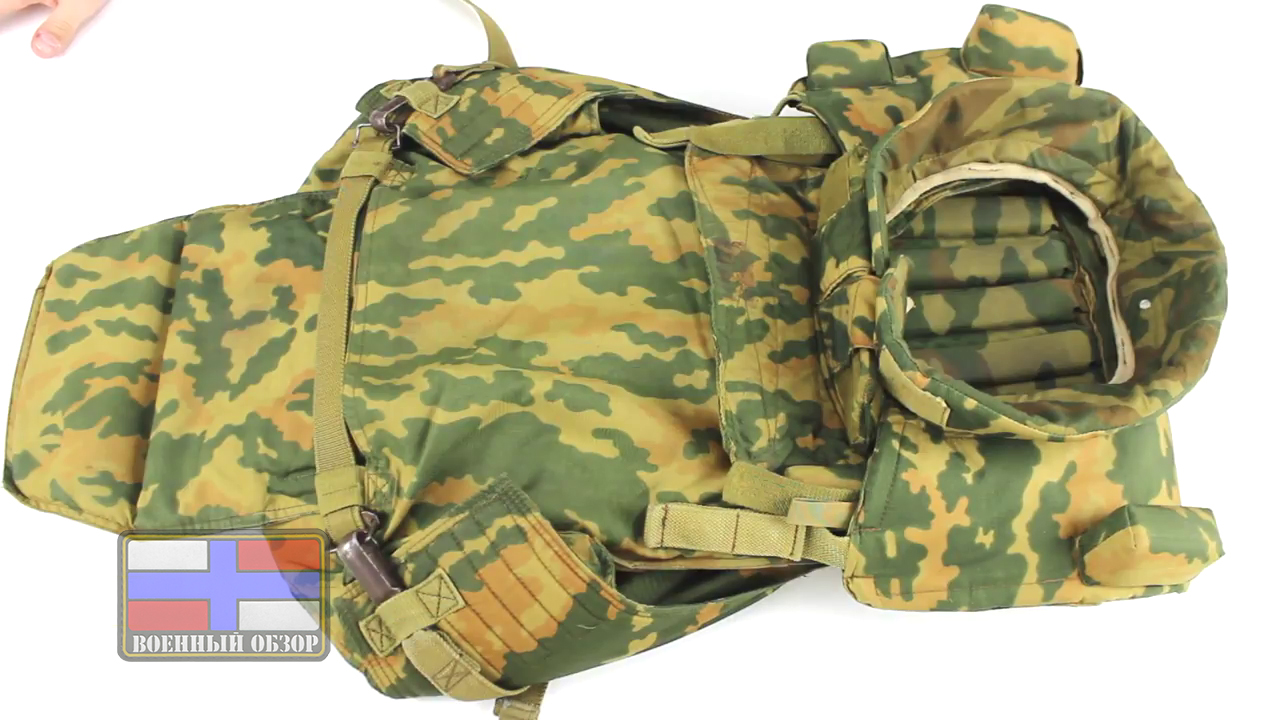
6B12 ballistic vest (with steel front plate)

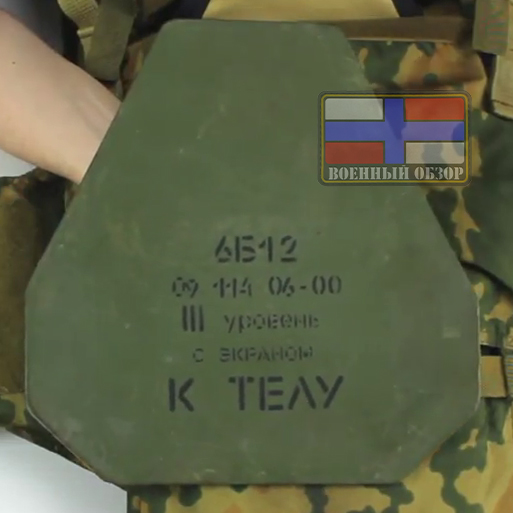
Steel front plate. Grau level III protection

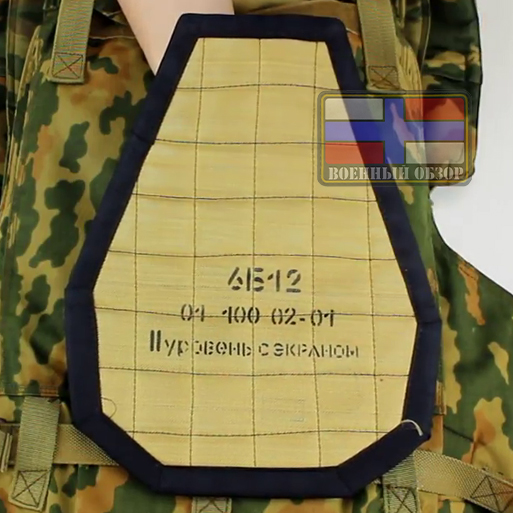
Aramid back panel. Grau level II protection

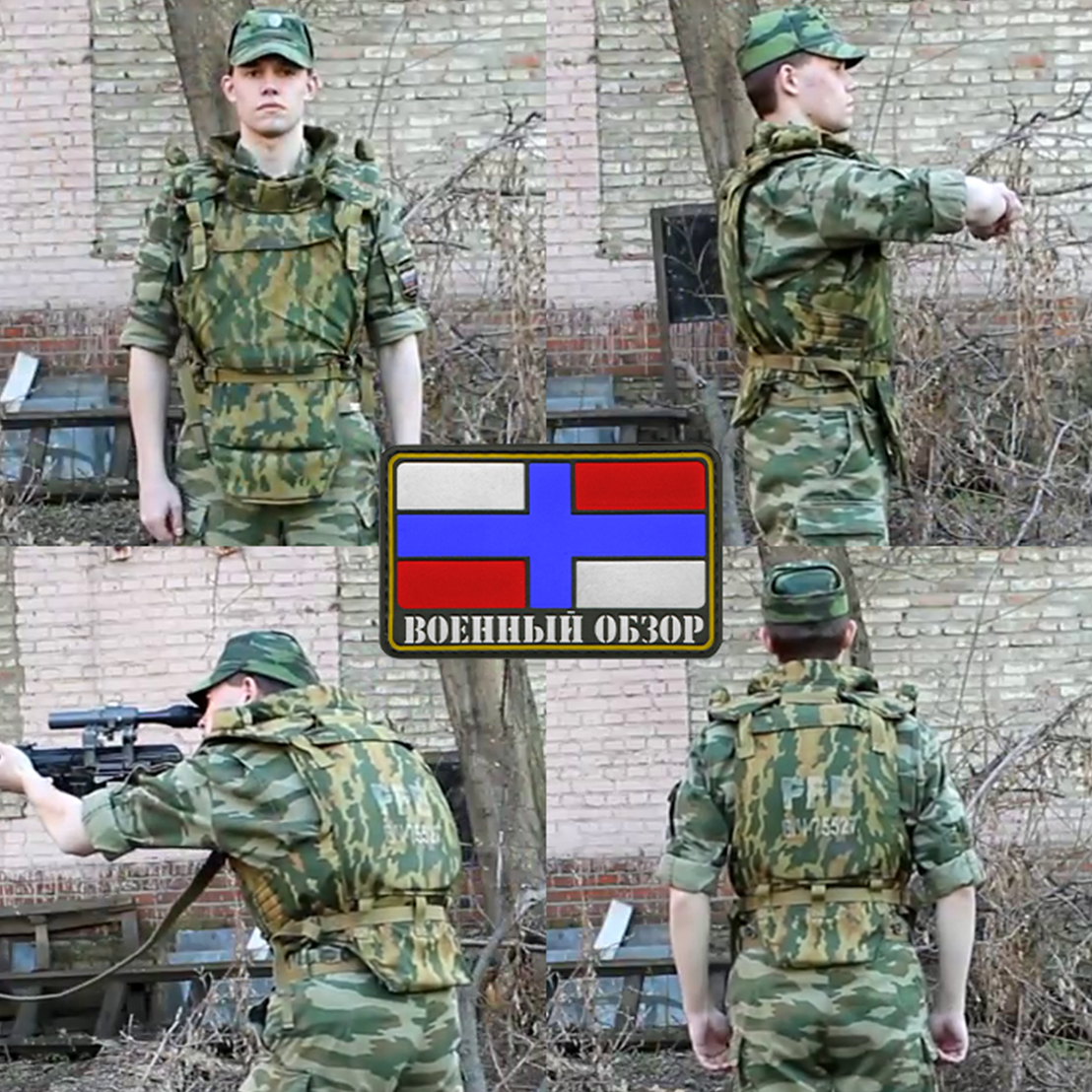
6B12 vest
