= 6B5 "Ulej" =

Soviet ballistic vest

6B5
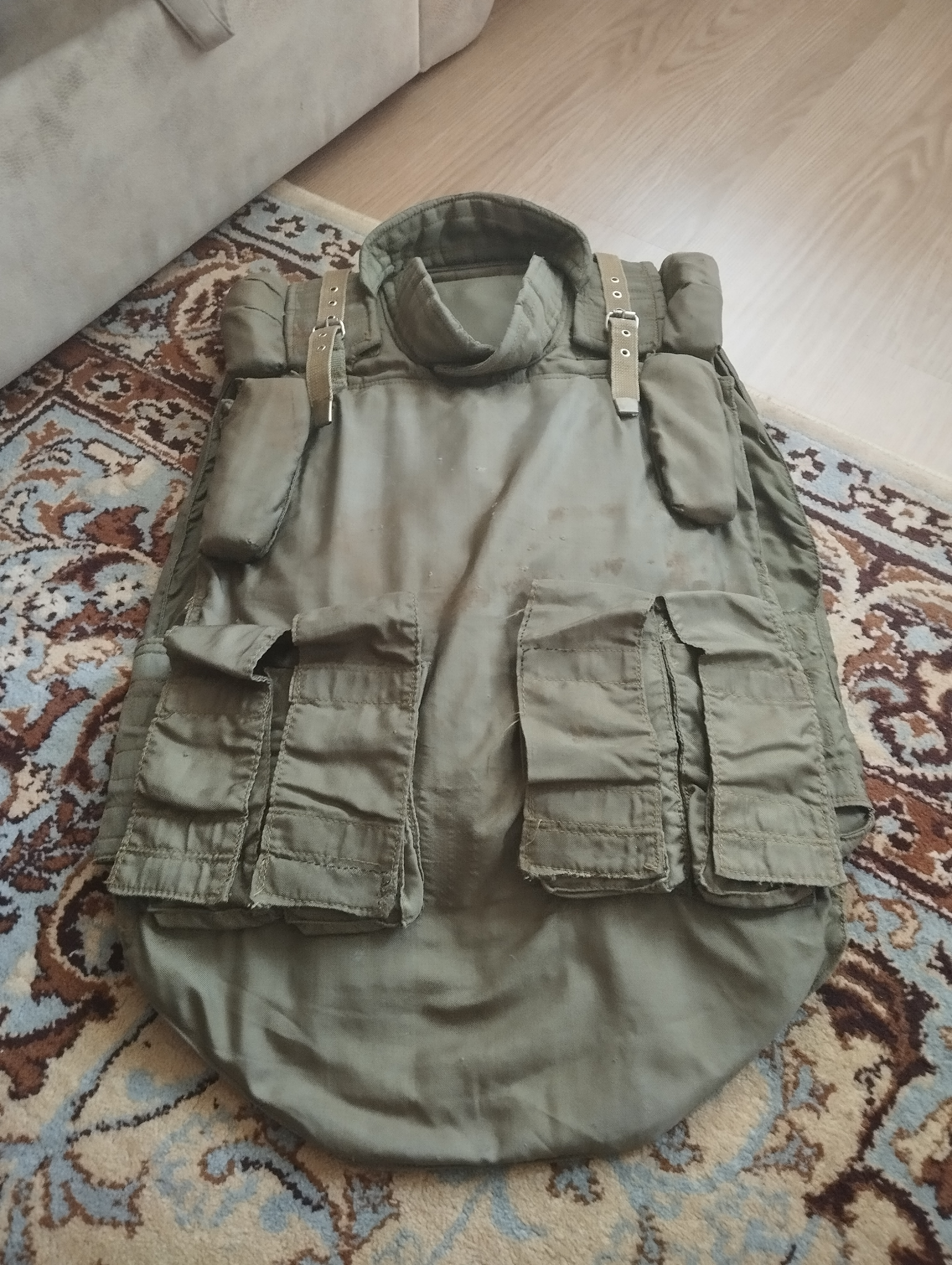
- 6B5 ballistic vest
- Type: Ballistic vest
- Place of origin: Soviet Union

Service history
- In service: 1986–?
- Used by: Soviet Armed Forces; Russian Armed Forces
- Wars: Transnistria War; Nagorno-Karabakh War; Georgian Civil War; South Ossetia War; War in Abkhazia; 1993 Russian constitutional crisis First Chechen War; Second Chechen War; War in Donbas

Production history
- Designer: NII Stali
- Designed: 1985
- Produced: 1986–?

Specifications
- Weight: 3.7–14 kg depending on variant

The 6B5 (Russian: 6Б5), is a bulletproof vest family created for the Soviet Armed Forces by NII Stali. The 6B5 was designed as a replacement for previous 6B3 and 6B4 body armour.

== History ==
The 6B5 ballistic vest system made to replace the 6B3 and 6B4 body armours was designed by NII Stali enterprise in 1985. In 1986 the 6B5 ballistic vest was accepted into service by order of the Soviet Minister of Defence. Out of the 19 proposed 6B5 variants, only 9 were accepted into service. 6B5 vests also differed in the number of armour plates, where they were installed, and the materials used. Three plate materials were proposed for the vest: ceramic, titanium and steel. Production of 6B5 continued in some Post-Soviet nations until the mid-2000s.

The 6B5 was produced in many different variations of colour and camouflage throughout its lifetime, such as "Butan", "Barvikha" and "Berezka", as well as the solid "Olive" colour.

The 6B5 vest saw service in multiple wars, including: Transnistria War, Nagorno-Karabakh War, Georgian Civil War, South Ossetia War, War in Abkhazia, First and Second Chechen wars.

Contrary to popular belief, the 6B5 did not see service in Afghanistan. 6B5 vests were only widely issued in 1989, shortly after the end of the Afghan War.

== Design ==
6B5 ballistic vests all have an identical textile base, but differ in types and number of ballistic plate elements. Plates can be of one of several materials: titanium, steel, ceramics.

The composition of the armor is very similar to that of the 6B3. The vest is composed of frontal and spinal sections, each having sets of plates inside of the aramid pockets. Both front and back are further protected by aramid (TSVM DZh-1) fabric liner (30 layers of fabric). These sections connect through fasteners on the shoulders and velcro fasteners on the sides. This vest is also notable for having neck protection and shoulder rests (on each side) for rifle or backpack slings.

The fabric cover of the vest has four built-in magazine pouches for Kalashnikov magazines on the front, as well as four slots for hand grenades on the back, and a large pouch on the back for storage.

The three main categories of the different modifications of the vest were:

- light variants for artillery crews, logistics personnel, etc. (flak vests),
- assault variants for short-term special combat missions, and
- general purpose vests for the mainline combat personnel of the Armed forces.
- 6B5-11 - Light variant. Fabric only variant without plates. Weighs 3 kg.
- 6B5-12 - Light variant. 1.25 mm ADU-605-80 (АДУ-605-80) titanium plates on the front and back. Weighs 5 kg.
- 6B5-13 - Assault variant. 6.5 mm ADU-605T-83 (АДУ-605Т-83) titanium plates on the front and back. Weighs 11 kg.
- 6B5-14 - Assault variant. 3.8 mm ADU 14.05 (АДУ 14.05) steel plates on the front and back. Weighs 11 kg.
- 6B5-15 - Assault variant. 13 mm ADU 14.20.00.000 (АДУ 14.20.00.000) boron carbide ceramic plates on the front and back. Weighs 11.5 kg.
- 6B5-16 - General purpose variant. 6.5 mm titanium plates on the front and 1.25 mm titanium plates on back. Weighs 7 kg.
- 6B5-17 - General purpose variant. 3.8 mm steel plates on the front and 1.25 mm titanium plates on back. Weighs 7 kg.
- 6B5-18 - General purpose variant. 13 mm boron carbide ceramic plates on the front and 1.25 mm titanium plates on back. Weighs 7 kg.
- 6B5-19 - General purpose variant. 6.5 mm titanium plates on the front with no plates on back. Weighs 6 kg.

Kalashnikov.ru
- Ballistic properties of the 6B5 vest

== Gallery ==
6B5 ballistic vest

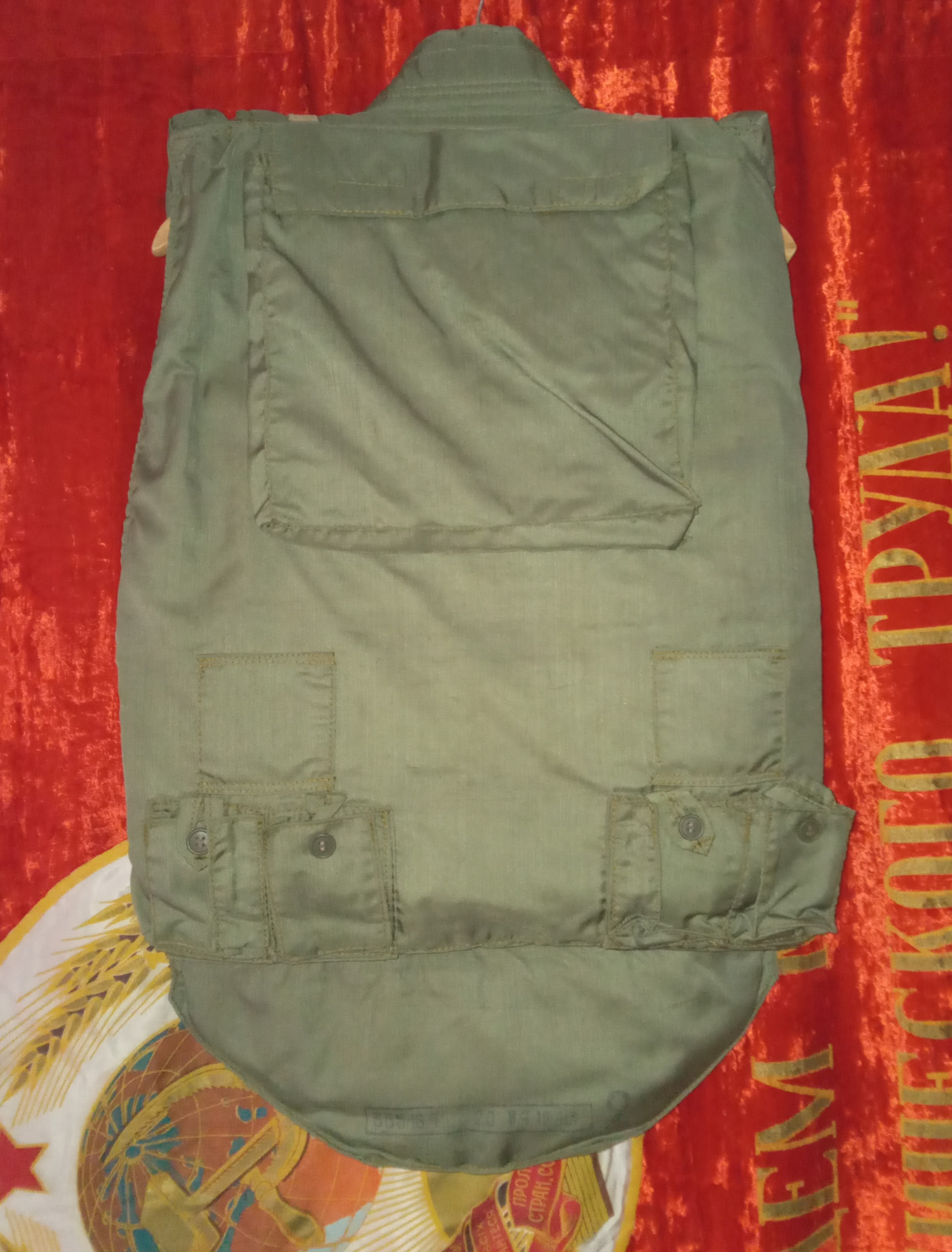
Back side of 6B5-16 vest

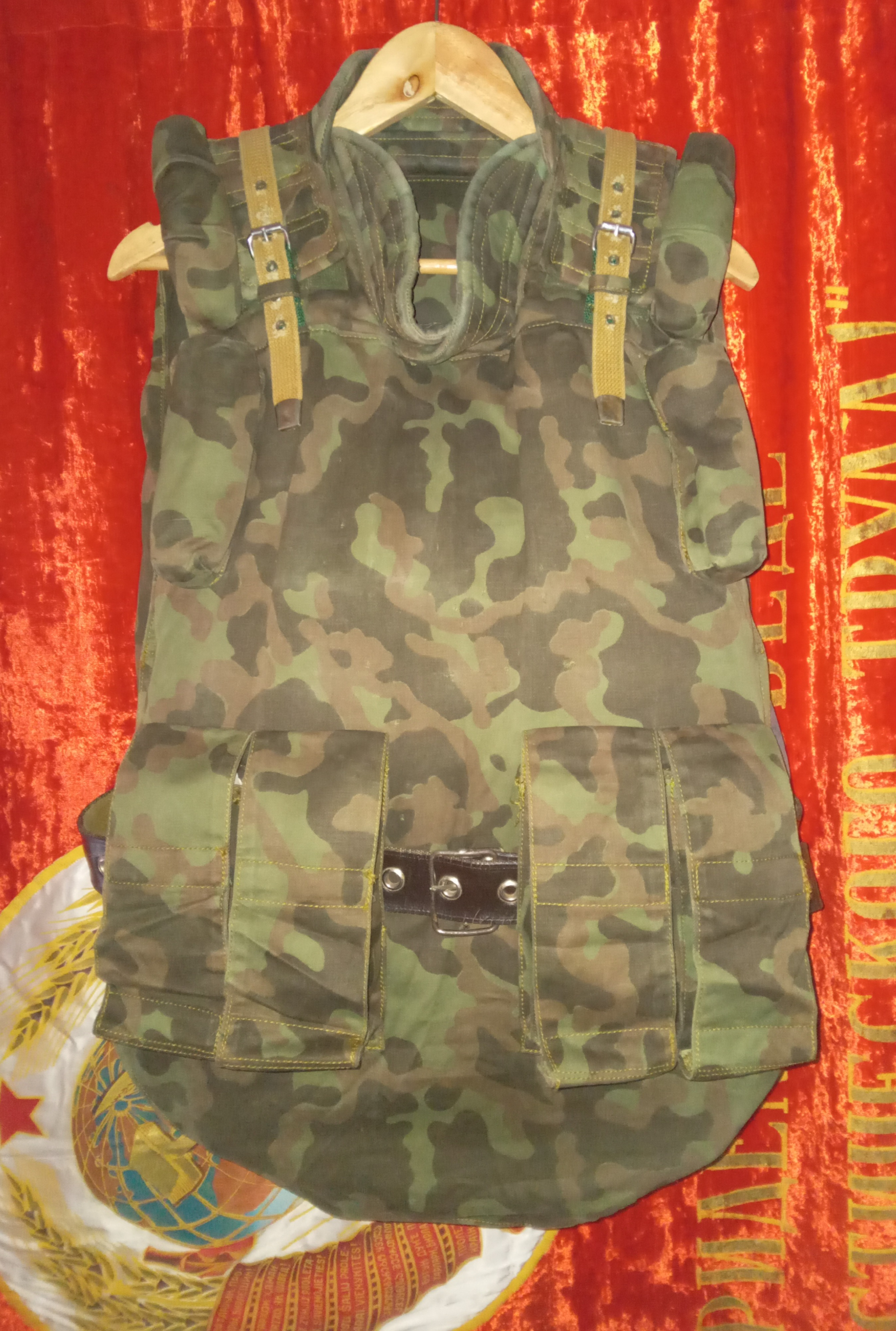
6B5 in "Butan" camo

== Users ==
=== Former users ===
- Abkhazia
- Armenia
- Azerbaijan
- Georgia
- Russia
- Soviet Union
- Transnistria
- Ukraine
