= 6B7 helmet =

Russian aramid combat helmet

6B7
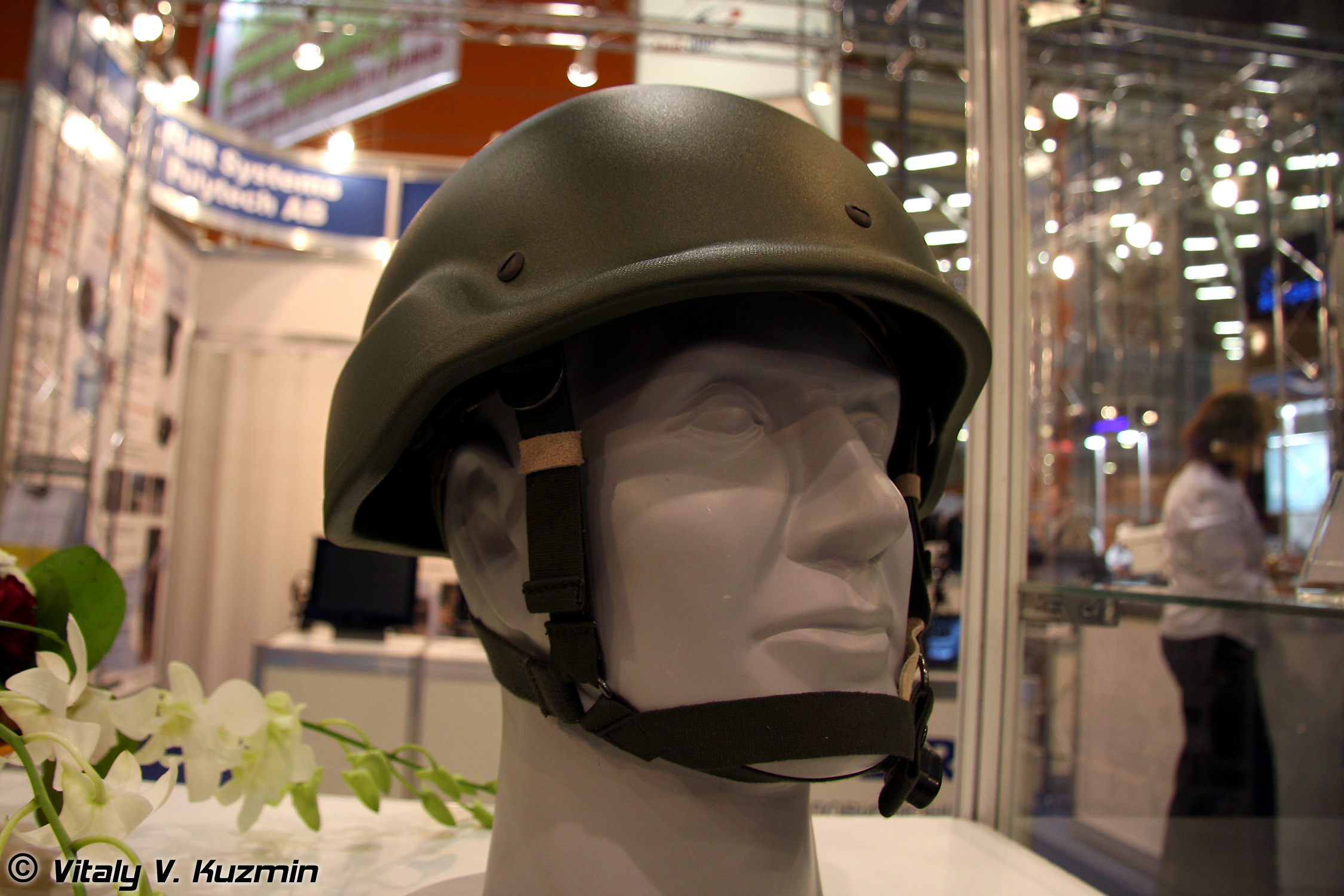
- 6B7-1M ballistic helmet
- Type: Combat helmet
- Place of origin: Soviet Union; Russian Federation

Service history
- In service: 2000-present
- Used by: See Users
- Wars: Second Chechen War; Russo-Georgian War; Annexation of Crimea; War in Donbass; Mali War; Russo-Ukrainian War; Wagner Group rebellion

Production history
- Designer: NII Stali
- Manufacturer: NII Stali
- Produced: 1998-2005
- Variants: 6B7, 6B7-1, 6B7-1M

Specifications
- Weight: 1,2 kg

The 6B7 is a ballistic helmet of the Russian Armed Forces. Being the first aramid helmet in the Russian army, it was fielded as a replacement of SSh-68 helmet. It was adopted in the year 2000 as part of Borit-M program.

== Design ==
6B7 helmet was developed as part of Borit-M program in 1990s by NII Stali. Borit program has been started sometime in the second half of 1980s with a task to develop a new composite helmet for the Soviet army as a response to US PASGT helmets.

6B7 is the first generation composite helmet in service with the Russian army, being made out of a composite of aramid fabric and polymer. Discarding steel as a material allowed to make the helmet lighter compared to the previous SSh-68.

The helmet provides Br1 protection according to Russian GOST system.

== Variants ==
- 6B7 – original helmet by NII Stali.
- 6B7-1 – helmet developed and produced by Armokom on the basis of 6B7. Main changes were done to the suspension system.
- 6B7-1M – modification of 6B7-1 by Armokom. Shape was slightly changed, as well as weight slightly reduced (1.1–1.15 kg depending on the size). Further improvements to suspension system.

== Users ==
=== Current ===
- Russia
- Uzbekistan

=== Former ===
- Ba'athist Syria

=== Non-state actors ===
- Wagner Group - 6B7-1M seen in use by Wagner forces, most notably during the Wagner Group rebellion

== See also ==
- PASGT helmet

== Bibliography ==
- Galeotti, Mark (2025). Putin's Mercenaries, 2013–24. Bloomsbury Publishing. ISBN 978-1472866264.
