= Flora camouflage =

Russian military camouflage

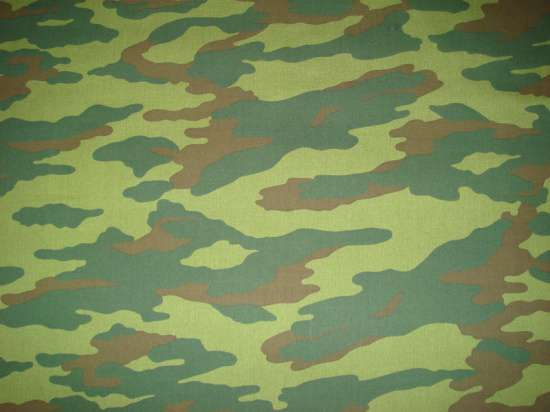
- Flora camouflage pattern
- Type: Military camouflage pattern
- Place of origin: Russian Federation

Service history
- In service: 1998–2011
- Used by: See Users
- Wars: Second Chechen War; Russo-Georgian War; Annexation of Crimea by the Russian Federation; War in Donbas

Flora (Russian: Флора, sometimes erroneously called VSR-98, which stands for Vooruzhennyye sily Rossii or Russian Armed Forces 1998.) is a military camouflage pattern formerly used by the Russian Armed Forces.

The pattern has some design similarities with the Butan and Tiger stripe camo.

== History ==
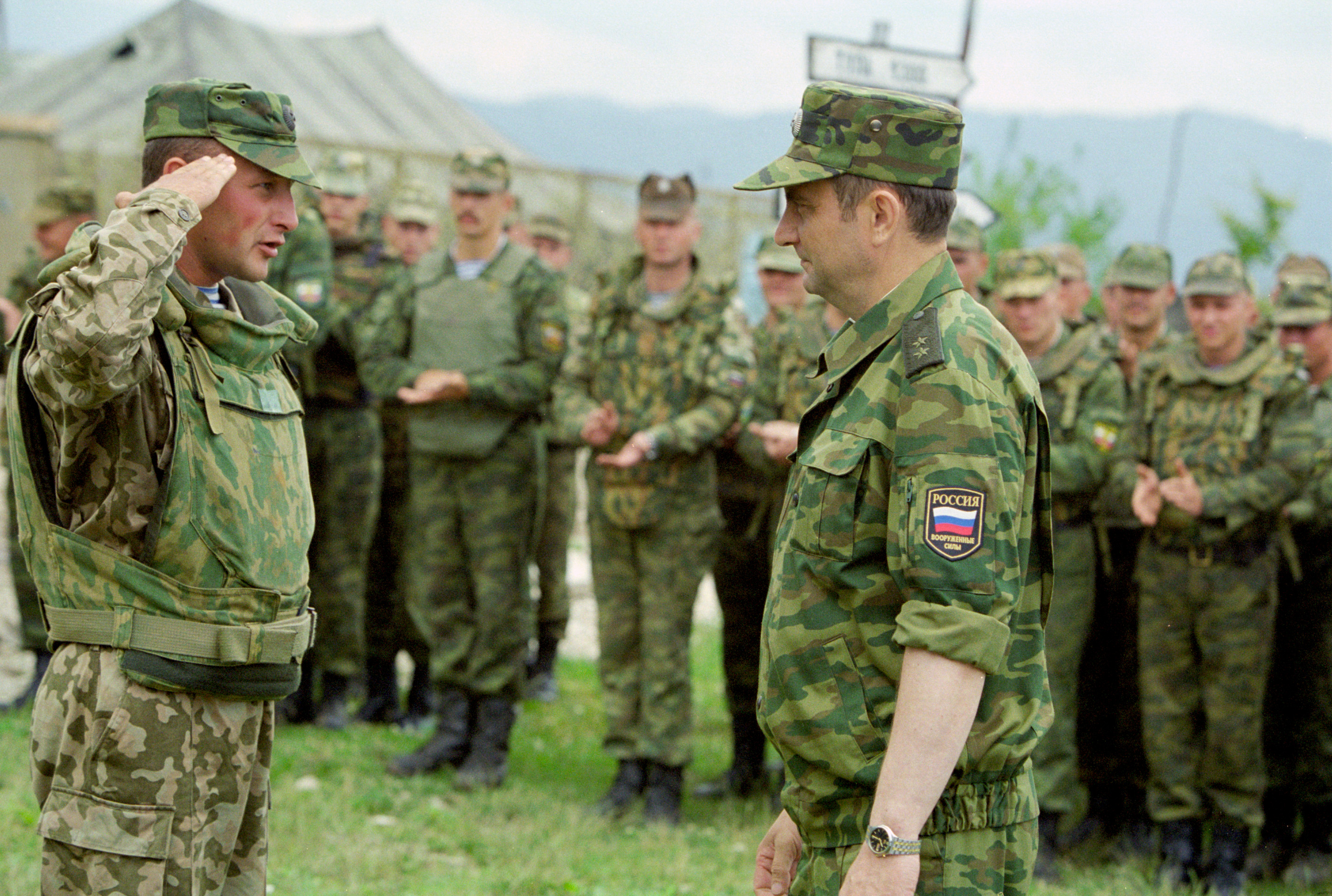
A. Kolmakov, commander of Russian VDV forces (right), in Flora camouflage receiving a report from a soldier in Dubok camouflage. The soldier on the left and the troops in the background are wearing Zabralo armor in Barviha camouflage. 2004.

Flora came as a replacement for the "Barvikha" camouflage - the name of the R&D program. The pattern did not have an official name, so popular nicknames like "vertikalka" (vertical), berezka (birch), VSR-93 and so on appeared.

Flora was adopted into the Armed Forces of the Russian Federation in 1998.

The camo was last seen with claimed pro-Moscow Crimean auxiliaries during the Annexation of Crimea by the Russian Federation and with some Russian troops in the War in Donbass.

The Russians started replacing Flora with EMR in 2011. However, some are still used by military educational institutes, Russian soldiers in parades and in Ukraine.

== Design ==
Flora is optimised for an environment typical of central Russia and is effective at silhouette dissolution. Because of the characteristic stripes, "Flora" was nicknamed "Arbuznyj" (watermelony; арбузный) camouflage.

The overall color scheme can vary widely depending on the fabric used by the manufacturer.

"Flora" consists of the green Flora pattern and the Mountain Flora pattern, which has dark yellow, sand or khaki color.

== Users ==
=== Former ===
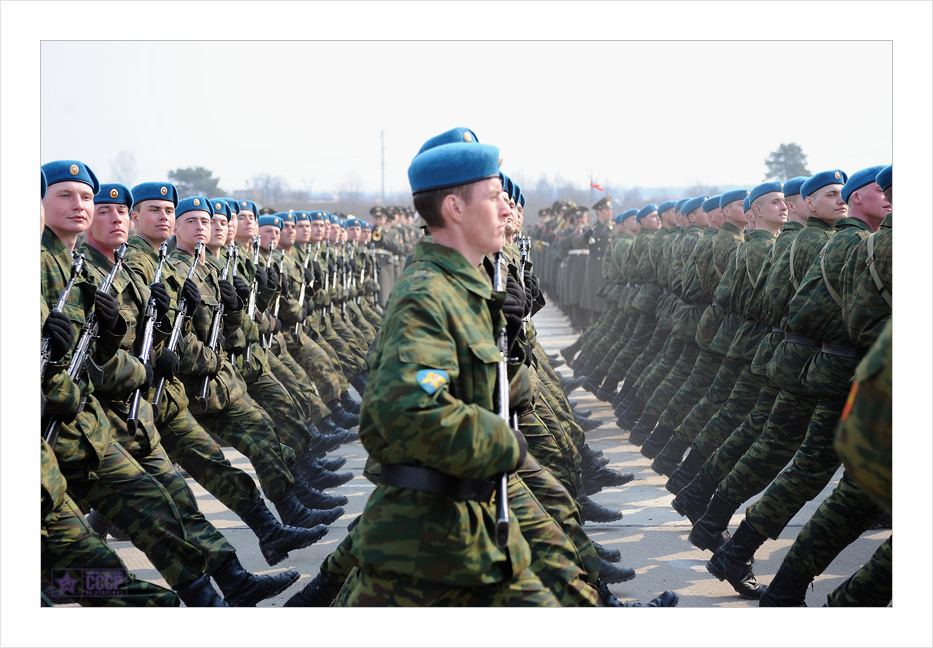
Russian paratroopers wearing Flora camouflage

- Belarus: Replaced by EMR.
- Russia: Formerly used by all branches of Russian Armed Forces. Replaced by EMR by 2011. However, some are still used by military educational institutes, Russian soldiers in parades and in Ukraine.
- Tajikistan: Adopted EMR to replace Flora.

=== Partially-recognized states ===
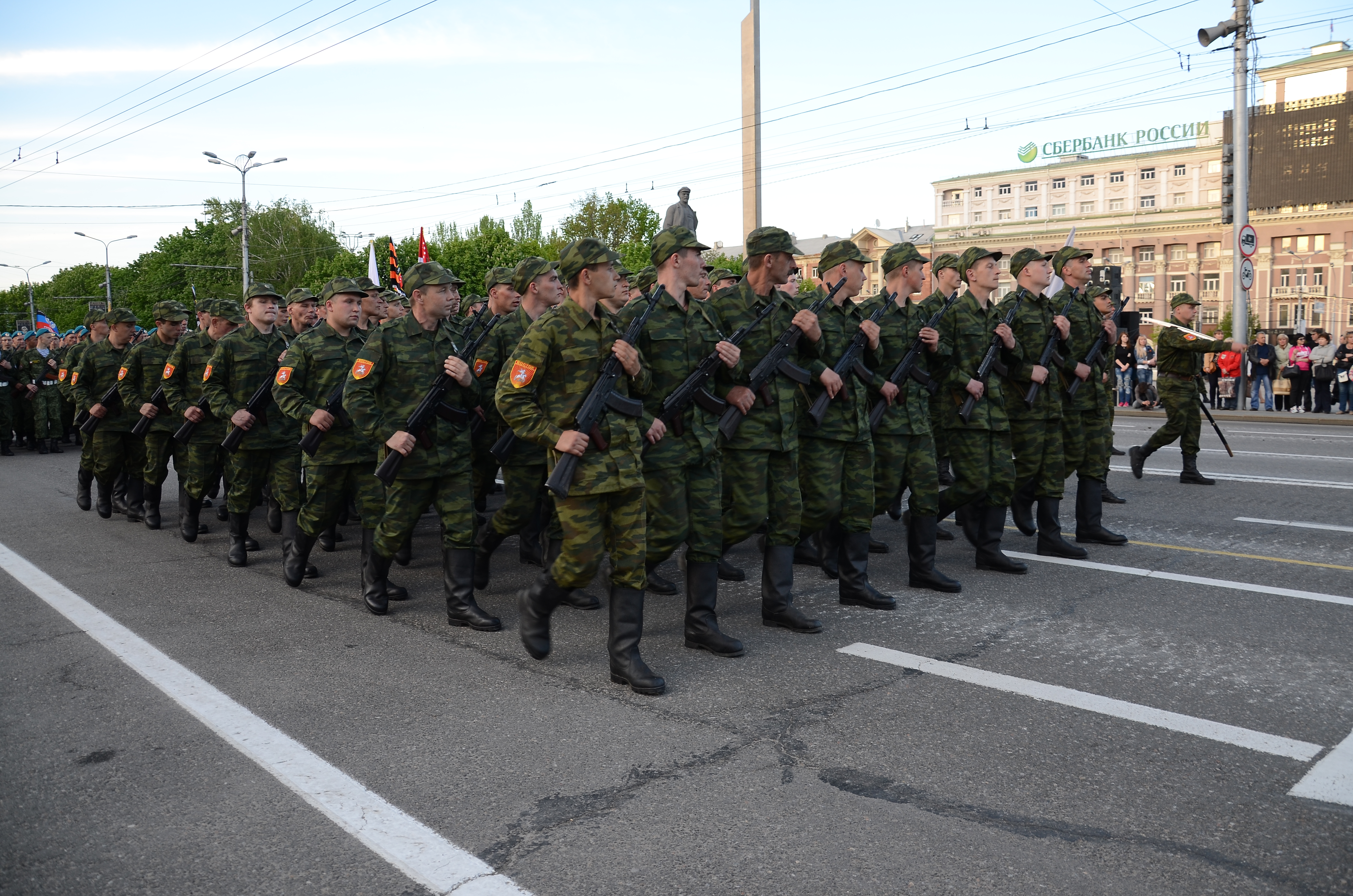
Donetsk's Vostok Battalion wearing Flora during the rehearsal for the 2015 Victory Parade in Donetsk

- Donetsk People's Republic
- Luhansk People's Republic

=== Non-State Actors ===
- Russian Orthodox Army
- Rusich Group

== Bibliography ==
- Crowther, Edward (2022). War in Ukraine: Volume 1: Armed Formations of the Donetsk People's Republic, 2014-2022. Helion and Company. ISBN 978-1915070661.
- Crowther, Edward (2023). War in Ukraine: Volume 3: Armed Formations of the Luhansk People's Republic, 2014–2022. Helion and Company. ISBN 978-1804512173.
- Galeotti, Mark (2019). Armies Of Russia's War In Ukraine. Osprey Publishing. ISBN 978-1472833440.
- Galeotti, Mark (2017). The Modern Russian Army 1992–2016. Osprey Publishing. ISBN 978-1472819086.
- Galeotti, Mark (2025). Putin's Mercenaries, 2013–24. Bloomsbury Publishing. ISBN 978-1472866264.
- Larson, Eric H. (2021). Camouflage: Modern International Military Patterns. Barnsley: Pen & Sword. ISBN 9781526739537.
