= 6B4 ballistic vest =

Soviet ballistic vest

6B4
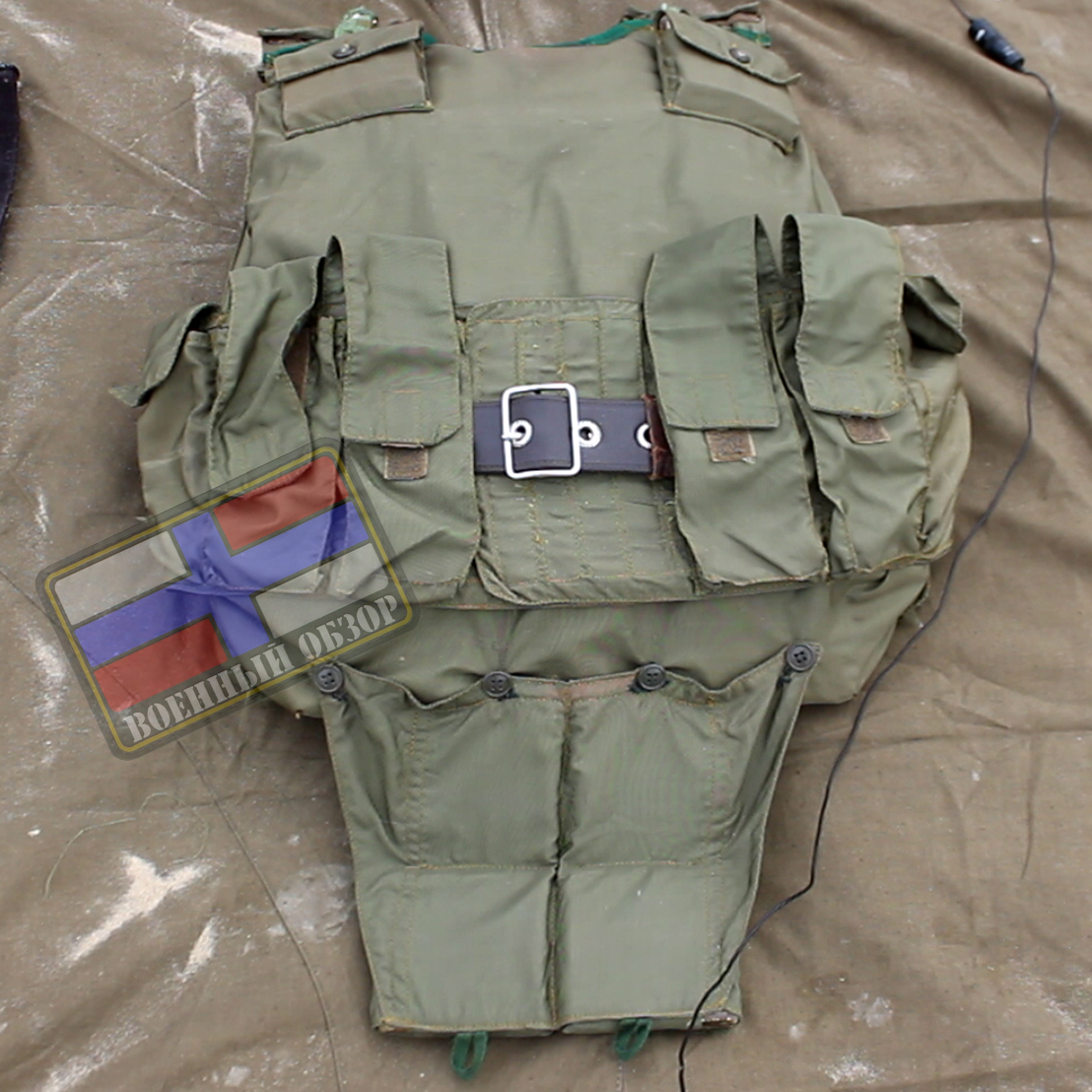
- 6B4-S (6Б4-С) ballistic vest. Note the groin area protection.
- Type: Ballistic vest
- Place of origin: Soviet Union

Service history
- In service: 1985-?
- Used by: Soviet Armed Forces
- Wars: Soviet-Afghan war First Nagorno-Karabakh War; Second Chechen War

Production history
- Designer: NII Stali

Specifications
- Weight: 6B4: 12 kg. 6B4-01: 7.6 kg.

The 6B4 (Russian: 6Б4) is a ceramic ballistic vest of the Soviet Armed Forces. Developed at the same time as the 6B3, it provided better protection from rifle rounds, but was much heavier, and as such was never produced or used in big numbers.

== History ==
The 6B3 ballistic vest that was issued to Soviet troops in Afghanistan was capable of stopping 7.62×39 PS rounds fired from AKM at a close range, however 5.56×45 M855 rounds fired from M16 at ranges closer than 100 meters could still pierce the vest. As such, the 6B4 ballistic vest was developed, which used boron carbide ADU 14.20.00.000 tiles capable of stopping close range M855 hits.

The vest was heavier than 6B3 and much more expensive, and as such was never produced in high numbers, however it continued to be used until well into the Second Chechen War.

== Design ==
The 6B4 body armor consists of two parts connected by a velcro fastener in the shoulder area. It is also equipped with a belt-buckle fastener that allows you to adjust the size according to your height. On the back of the armor is a fabric protective screen, and on the front are blocks of pockets with armor tiles. This body armor is equipped with two spare armor protection elements.

Unlike the 6B3TM, 6B4 has an elongated chest section, which provides protection for the lower abdomen. Unlike 6B3, the mounting system for the plates is not removable from the fabric cover.

There were multiple modifications of the vest, which differed not only in the configuration, but also in the amount of plates sewn into the fabric. For example 6B4-O has 32 ceramic tiles, weighing 10.5 kg, while 6B4-S has 56 tiles, weighing 15.6 kg.

There were several variants of 6B4 armor:

- 6B4 - original version. Weighs 12 kg.
- 6B4-O - has 32 ceramic tiles, weighing 10.5 kg.
- 6B4-P - has 40 ceramic tiles, weight 12.2 kg.
- 6B4-S - Heavy variant originally designed for the guard duty. Has 56 ceramic tiles and weighs 15.6 kg.
- 6B4-01 - Light variant with titanium ADU-605-80 plates on the back, weighs 7.6 kg.

== Users ==
=== Former users ===
- Azerbaijan
- Russia
- Soviet Union
