= 6B23 ballistic vest =

Russian bulletproof vest (body armor)

6B23
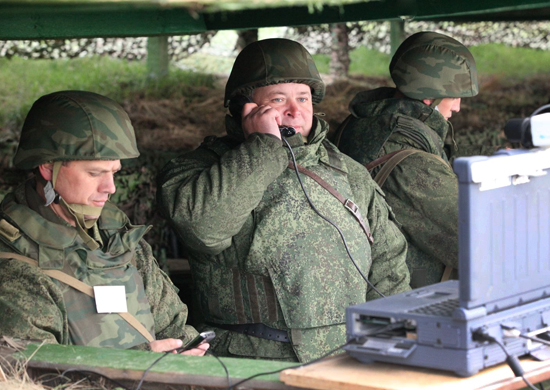
- Russian servicemen during Tsentr-2011
- Type: Bulletproof vest
- Place of origin: Russian Federation

Service history
- In service: 2003-present
- Used by: Russian Armed Forces
- Wars: Second Chechen War; Russo-Georgian War; Annexation of Crimea; Russian invasion of Ukraine

Production history
- Designer: NPP KlASS

Specifications
- Weight: 4 to 10.2 kg (depending on the use of plates)

The 6B23 (Russian: 6Б23) is a ballistic vest of the Armed Forces of the Russian Federation. Introduced in 2003, it had been the standard issued body armor of the Russian army until the adoption and mass production of the 6B45 in around 2015. It is still issued to reserve Russian units and certain separatist militias in Ukraine, mainly due to being superseded by RATNIK.

== Background ==
The 6B23 was designed by NPP KlASS and introduced in 2003 to supplement and potentially replace older body armor in Russian service. A range of body armors were introduced in the previous decade (6B11, 6B12, 6B13, 6B17, 6B18) but they never became universally adopted in Russian army. The 6B23 is no longer being procured, due to adoption of newer vests, but NPP KlASS continues to produce Korund-VM vests, which are essentially modernized 6B23s.

== Technical details ==
The 6B23 ballistic vest comes in several variants. A characteristic feature of the new vest is improved ergonomics and a modular approach to protection. In the basic configuration, the 6B23 uses fabric elements based on 30 layers of Kevlar-like material (TSVM-2). They are located on the chest, back and sides. The 6B23-1 configuration has a steel chest armor plate, and the 6B23-2 uses a Granit-4M ceramic plate on the chest and steel on the back. Weight, depending on the panels used, ranges from 4 to 10.2 kg.

The cover comes in several camouflage patterns, mainly VSR-98 Flora pattern and EMR camouflage.

The main aramid protection all around the vest procure fragment protection up to V50 540 m/s for 6.3mm steel ball, the rear aramid reinforcement provides class 2 protection; steel and ceramic plates provide class 3 and 4 respectively.

Fabric panel (level II protection) in the back is made of 30 layers of TSVM-2 Kevlar-like material and provides protection against bullets from TT pistol (cartridge 57-N-134S) and PMM (cartridge 7N16) from 5 meters, has increased anti-fragmentation resistance (fragment weighing 1 g at a speed of 600 m/s, 50%,). Weight is 4 kg.

Steel armor panel (level III protection, variant called 6B23-1) is 6.3 mm thick and made of “44S” steel providing protection against bullets from an AKM assault rifle with a heat-strengthened core (cartridge 57-N-231) from 10 m, an AK-74 rifle (cartridges 7N22, 7N24), M16 rifle (M193 and M855 cartridges) from 25 m, and SVD rifle (57-N-323S cartridge) with a steel core from a distance of 50 m. Weight with frontal steel and fabric back panels is 7.9 kg.

Сeramic armor panel (level IV protection, variant called 6B23-2) with The Granit-4M provides protection against armor-piercing incendiary bullets from an AKM assault rifle (cartridge 57-B3-231) from a distance of 50 m and bullets from an SVD rifle (cartridge 7N13 or 7-B3-3) from a distance of 100 m. Weight with frontal ceramic and fabric back panels is 7.2 kg. Replacing fabric back panel with a steel one increases weight to 10.2 kg.

The body armor is available in three standard sizes:

- 1st size – for personnel with a chest circumference of up to 96 cm and height from 158 to 172 cm,
- 2nd size – for personnel with a chest circumference from 96 to 104 cm and a height from 172 to 182 cm,
- 3rd size – for personnel with a chest circumference from 104 to 116 cm and a height from 182 to 188 cm.

== Gallery ==
6B23 in Russian armed forces

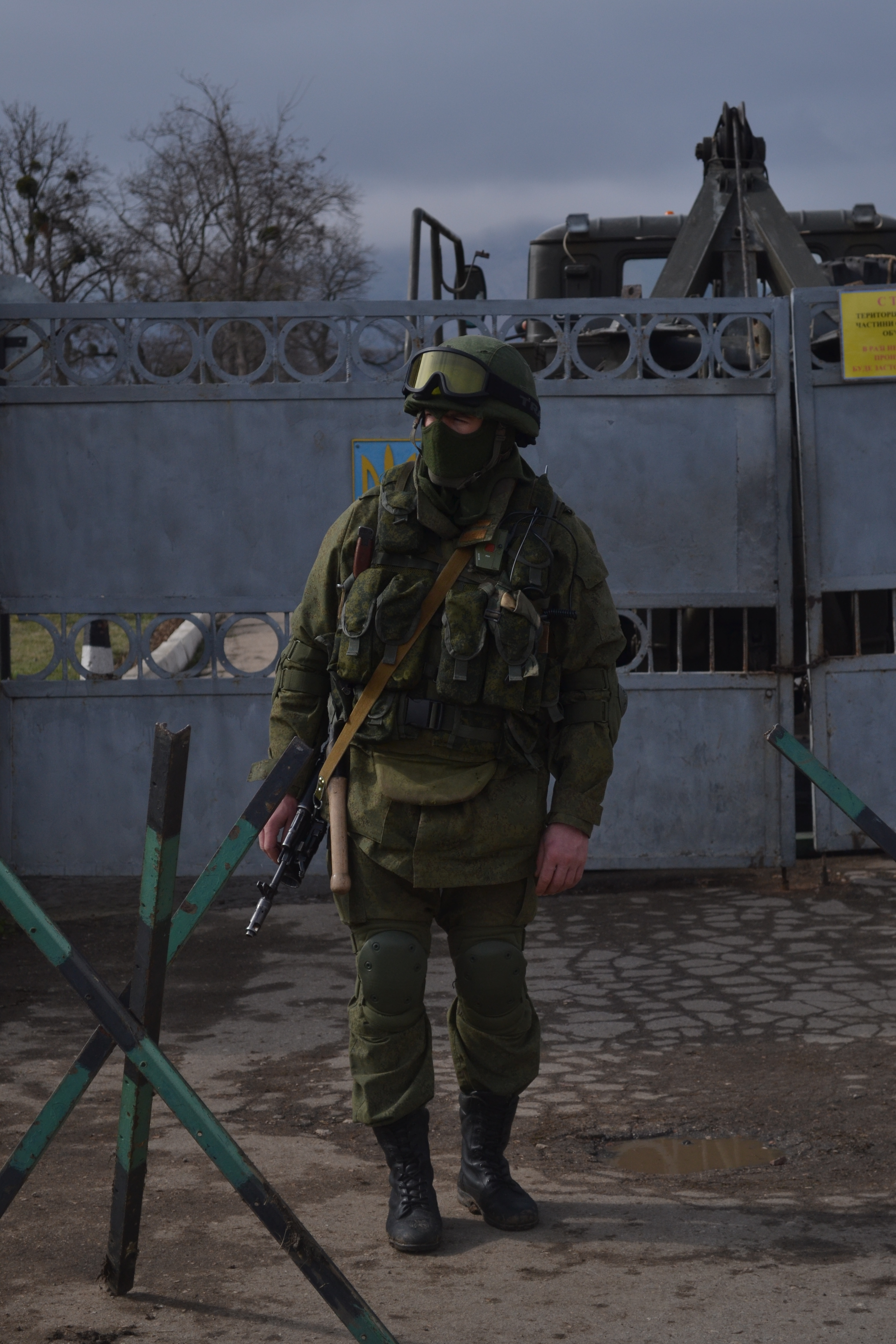
Little green man in Crimea wearing 6B23 (2014)

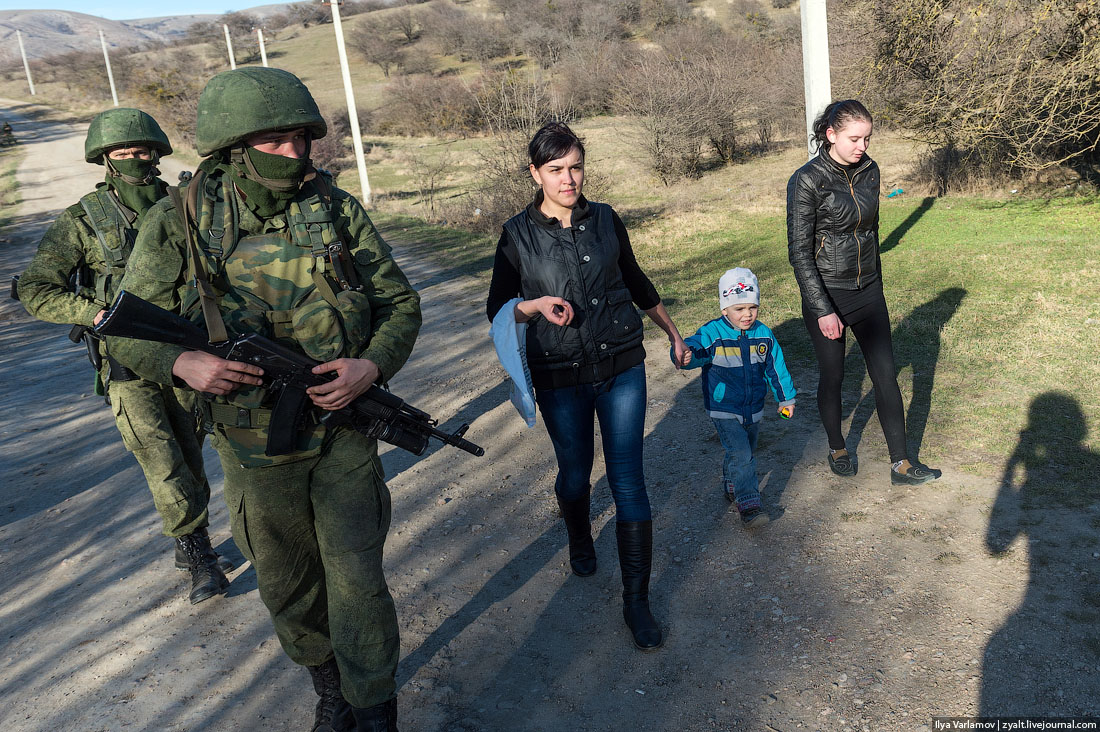
Little green men in Crimea wearing Flora variant of 6B23 (2014)

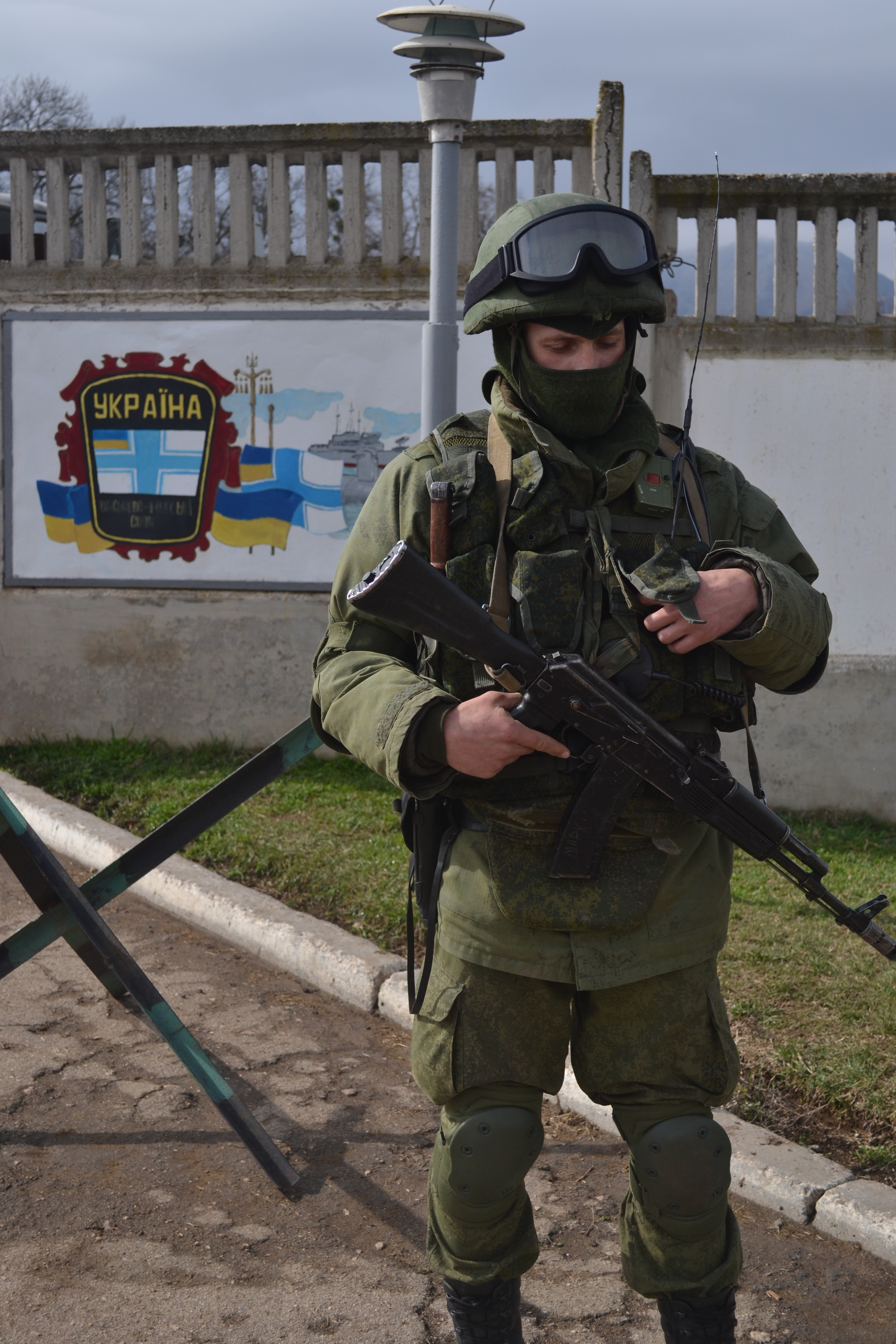
Little green man in Crimea wearing 6B23 (2014)

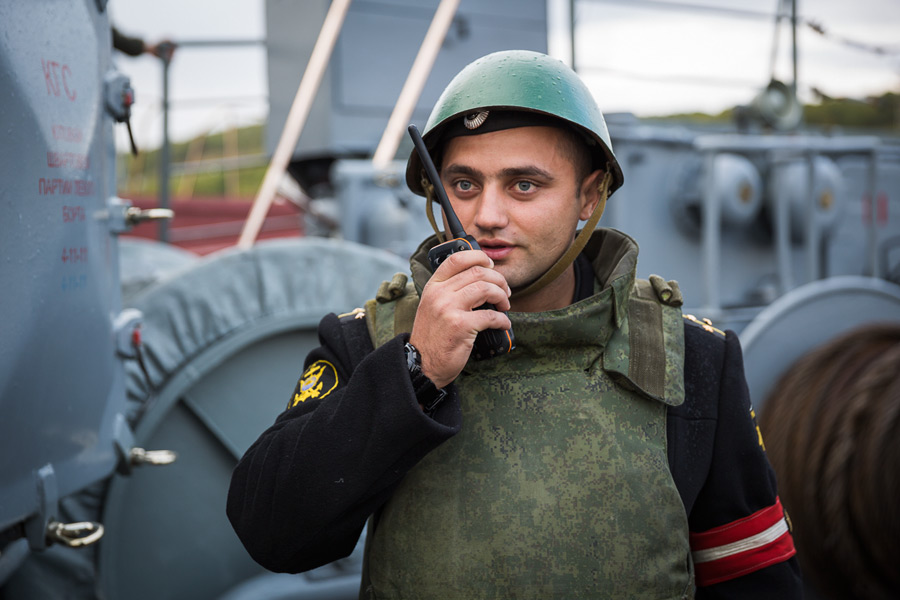
Pacific fleet officer wearing 6B23 armor (2014)

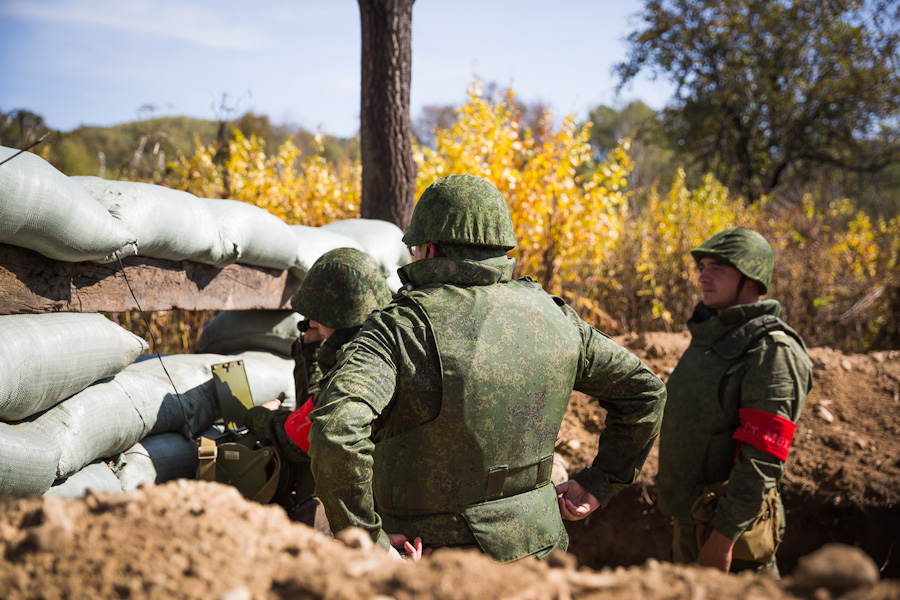
Soldier of the 107th Rocket Brigade wearing 6B23. Fabric back panel can be clearly seen

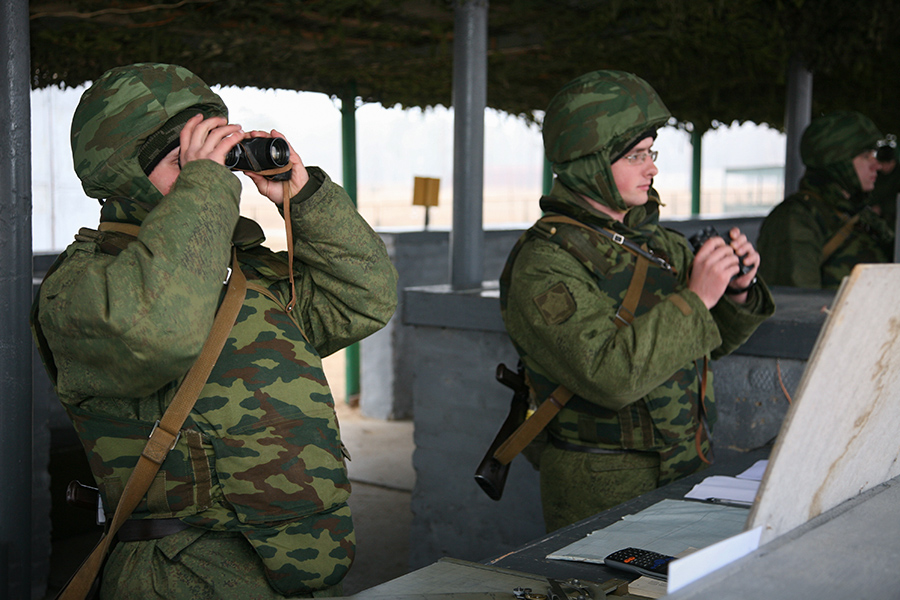
Russian artillerymen wearing Flora 6B23 (2014)

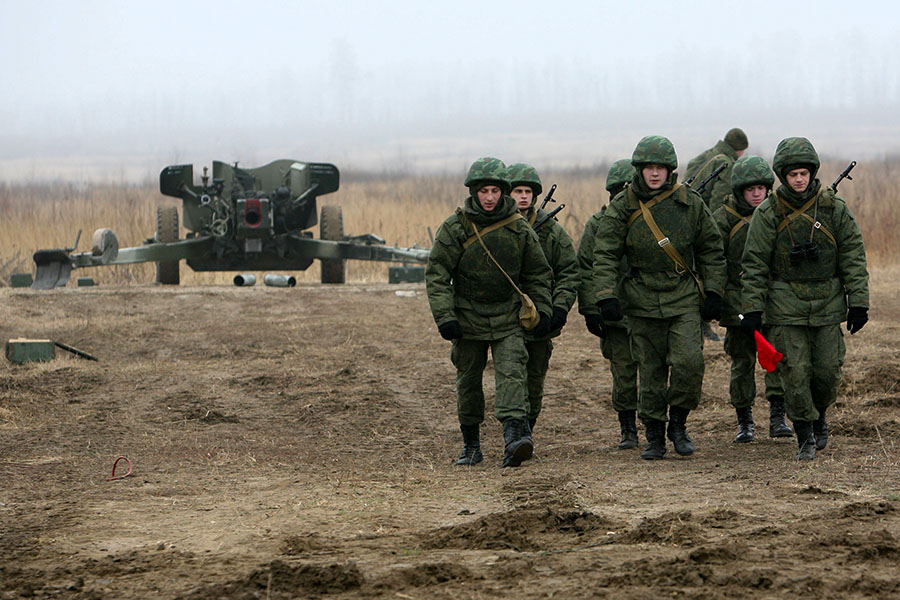
Russian artillerymen wearing EMR 6B23 (2014)

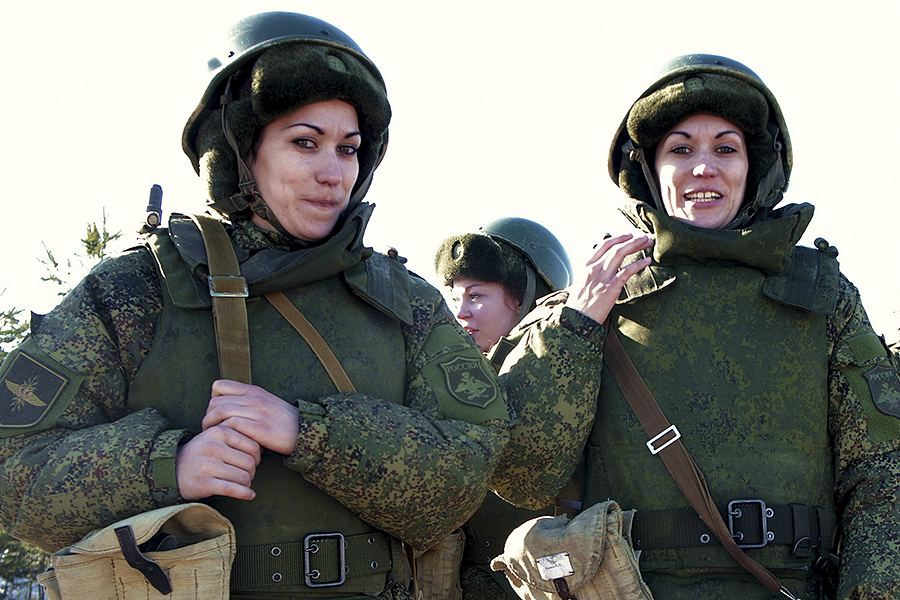
Russian servicewomen wearing 6B23 (2015)

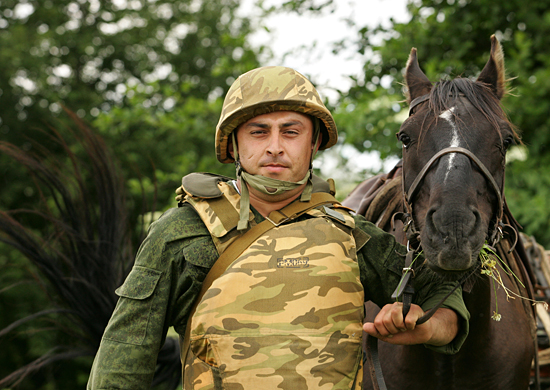
Rare version of 6B23 in Mountain Flora camouflage. Southern Military District. (2011)

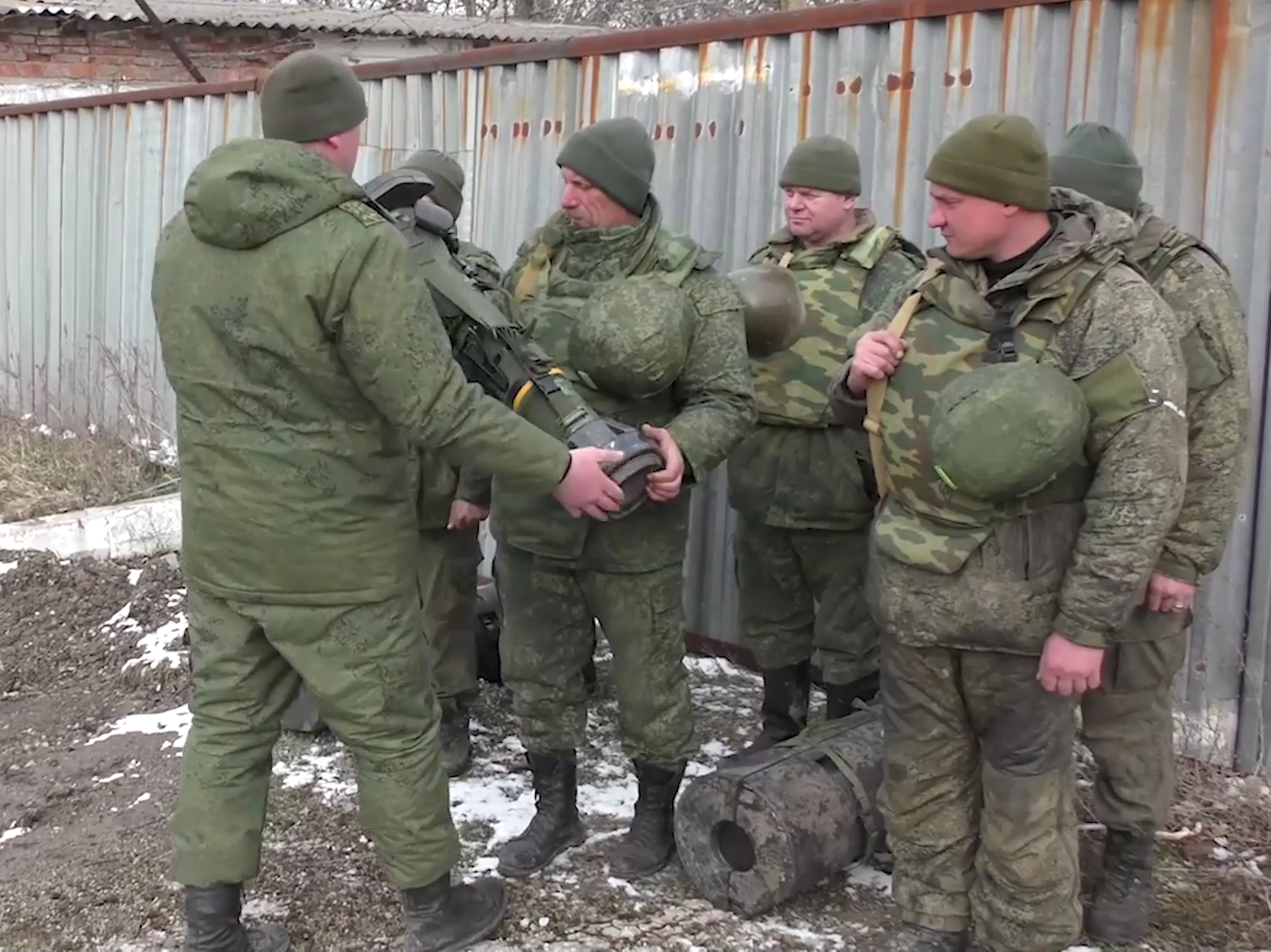
The 6B23 being used by paramilitary troops of the Luhansk People's Republic (LPR). (2022)
