= SSh-68 =

Russian and Soviet steel combat helmet

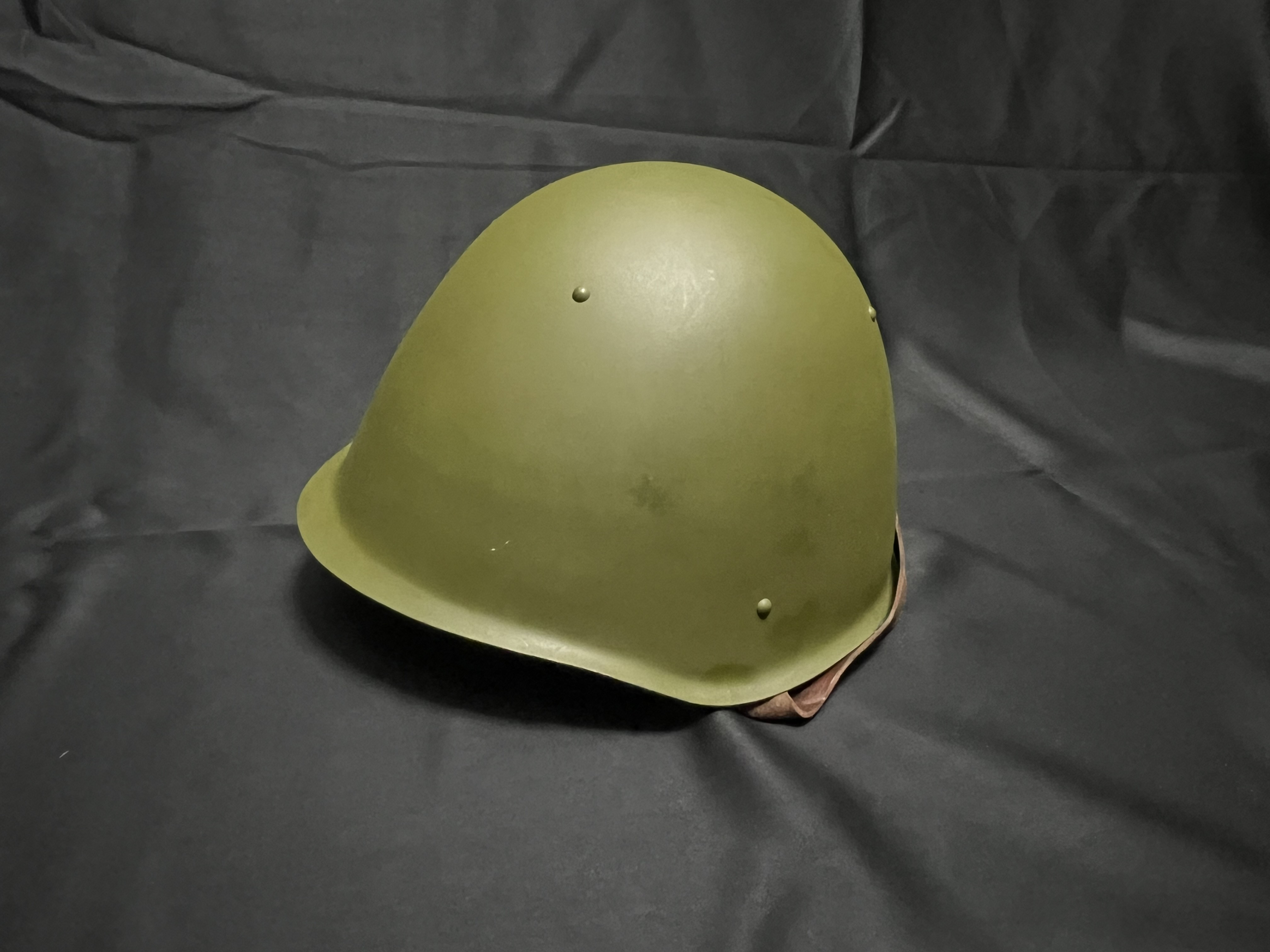
- SSh-68 helmet
- Type: Combat Helmet
- Place of origin: Soviet Union

Service history
- Used by: See Users
- Wars: Angolan Civil War; Sino-Vietnamese War; Soviet-Afghan War; 1982 Lebanon War; Invasion of Grenada; First Nagorno-Karabakh War; Georgian Civil War; Transnistria War; War in Abkhazia; Tajikistani Civil War; East Prigorodny Conflict; First Chechen War; War of Dagestan; Second Chechen War; Russo-Georgian War; War in Donbas; Second Nagorno-Karabakh War; Russo-Ukrainian war

Production history
- Designed: 1968
- Produced: 1973–1990s
- No. produced: 8,000,000 - 12,000,000
- Variants: See Variants

The SSh-68 (Russian: СШ-68 [стальной шлем образца 1968 года/stalnoy shlyem], English: SSh-68 steel helmet model 1968) - is a steel combat helmet of the Soviet and then Russian Armed Forces. The SSh-68 is a further development of the SSh-60 helmet. It differs primarily in its greater strength, greater front slope of the dome and the shorter outer edge. It is usually painted in dark green.

The SSh-68 was used by the armed forces of the Soviet Union and its Warsaw Pact allies, and others. Today, it is still in service in most countries of the CIS, as well as Vietnam and Afghanistan.

== History ==
Due to the introduction of improved helmets starting with the original 6B7, the SSh-68 was progressively withdrawn from service. In the Russian Armed Forces, the final examples are being gradually replaced by the newer 6B7-1M and 6B47 helmets.

== Design ==
The helmet weighs 1,300 grams (with leatherette balaclavas - 1,500 grams). SSh-68 provides protection from impact shock (machetes, etc.), and steel fragments (shrapnel) weighing 1.0 grams at speeds up to 250 m/s. The SSh-68 is not meant to protect against bullets.

=== Sizing ===
SSh-68s are available in three different sizes, P1 (small), P2 (medium), and P3 (large). SSh-68s are not sized as NATO helmets are since they are designed to be able to adjust for soldiers to wear an Ushanka or other heavy hat underneath it during the winter.

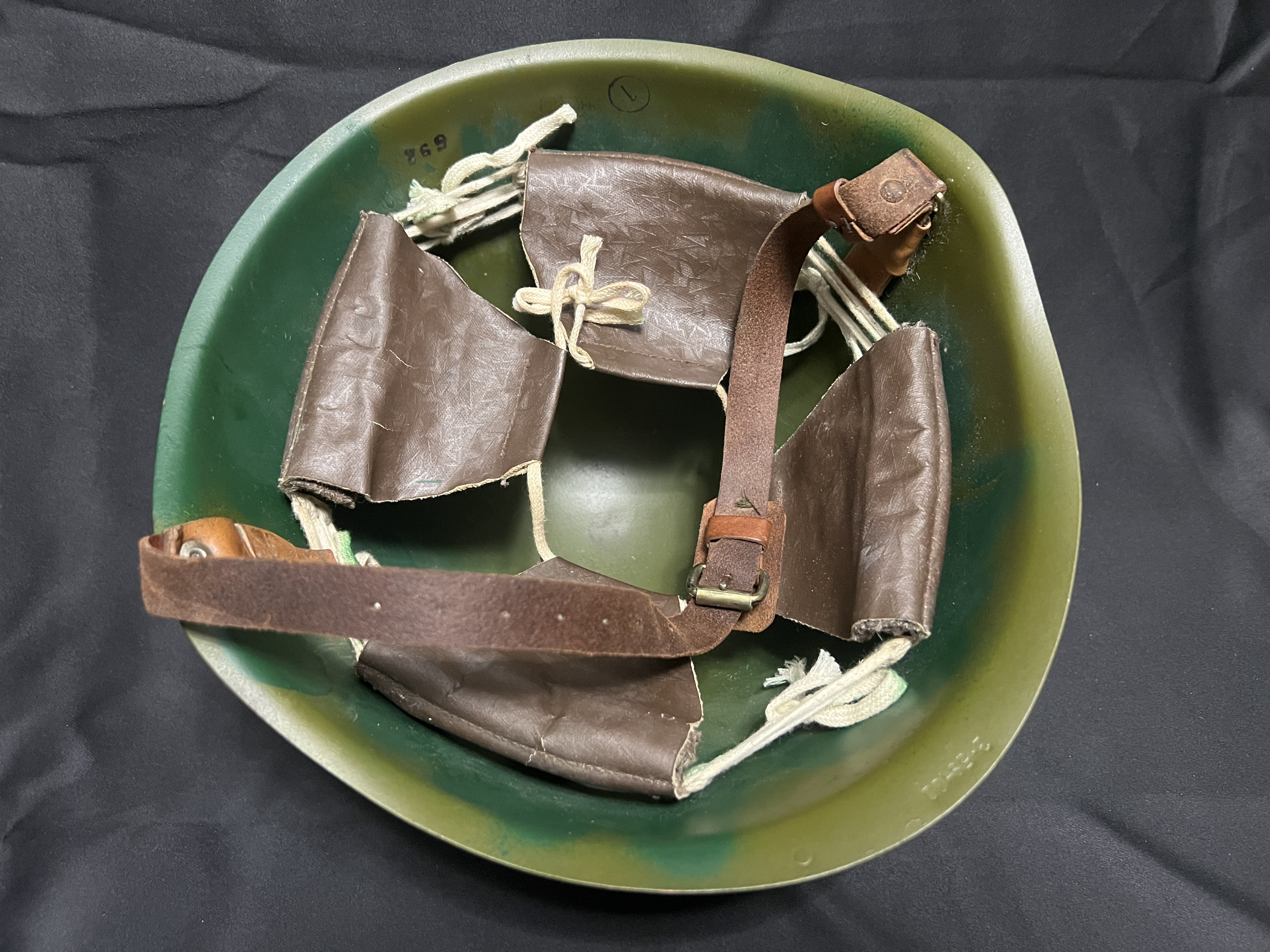
Leatherette liner and chinstrap system of the SSh-68 helmet.

Helmet sizes 1, 2, and 3 of the standard steel variant with the leatherette liner weighs 1.3 kg, 1.3 kg, and 1.32 kg respectively.

== Dimensions ==
The standard steel variants have different dimensions depending on the size.

Size 1 dimensions (LxWxH) 280/270/170mm

Size 2 dimensions 290/270/170 mm

Size 3 dimensions 300/260/175 mm

== Variants ==
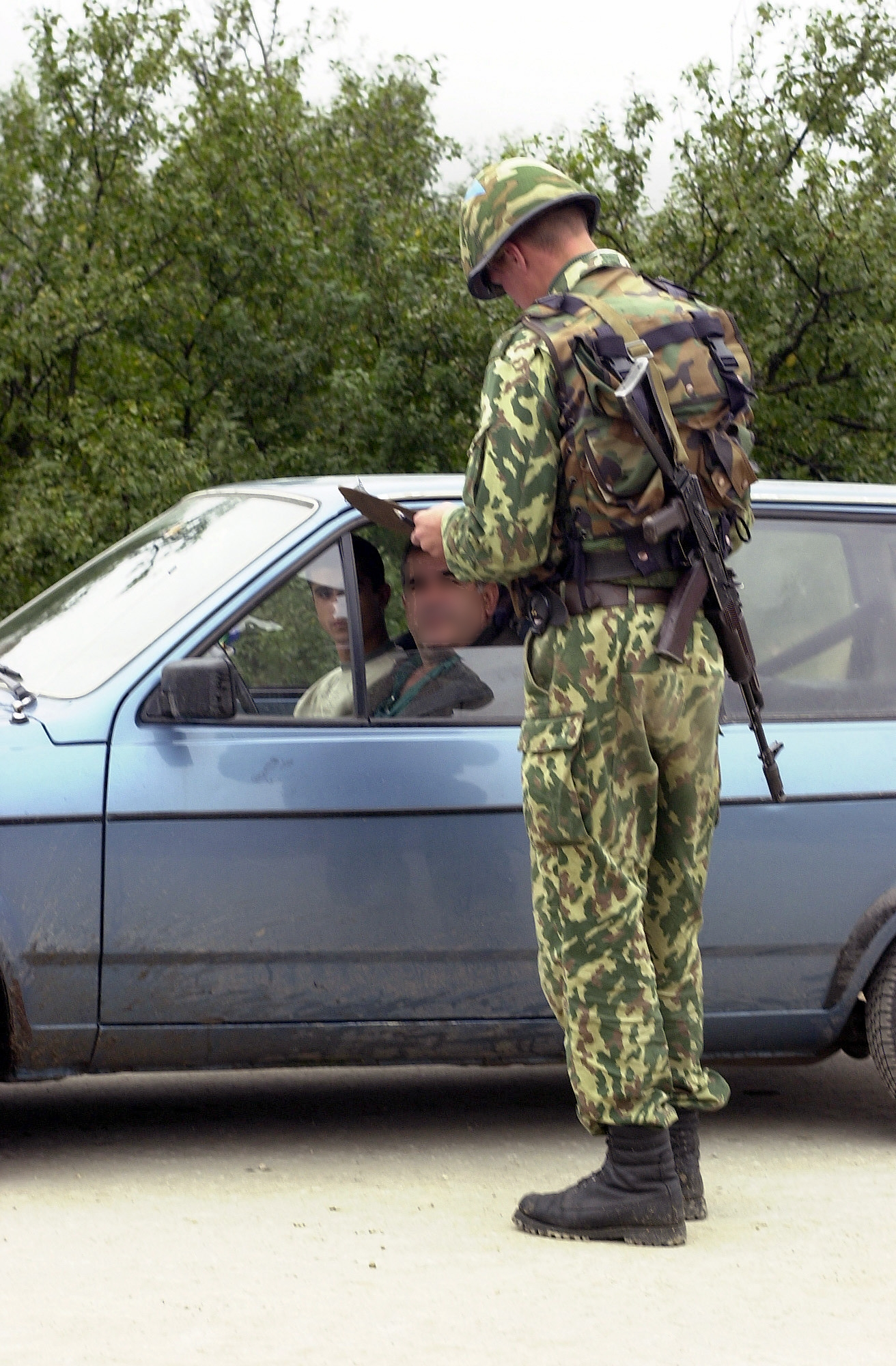
Russian KFOR soldier wearing an upgraded SSh-68 with an added inner Kevlar shell in 2001.

- SSh-68M/СШ-68М (GRAU index - 6B14) - A modernization of SSh-68 by installing an aramid fiber liner, called SVM, inside the helmet, as well as modern harness belt and restraint systems. As a result, the mass of the helmet is increased to 1.9 kg. The helmet is designed by "Special equipment and communication", for the personnel of the Russian Ministry of the Interior Internal Troops. The SSh-68M provides head protection of class 1 (pistol and revolver bullets). It's manufactured by NII Stali.
- SSh-68N "blank"/Заготовка (Grau index - 6B14) - Modernization of SSh-68 by increasing the thickness of the aramid membrane inside the helmet, as well as by the installation of modern harness belt and restraint systems. As a result, the mass of the helmet is increased to 2 kg. This helmet is designed for the personnel of the Russian armed forces. The helmet protects the head in class 1 (9×18mm Makarov pistol and revolver bullets), as well as from fragments of steel of spherical mass of 1.1 g (6.3 mm diameter of fragment) up to 400 m/s.

== Users ==
=== Current ===
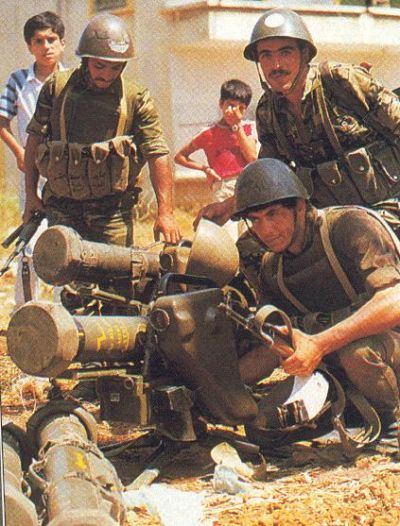
Syrian Army commandos wearing SSh-68s while operating a MILAN ATGM.

- Angola
- Armenia
- Azerbaijan
- Belarus
- Cuba - Used the SSh-68 during the Angolan Civil War, and during the Invasion of Grenada. SSh-68 still in use today
- Egypt
- Kazakhstan
- Moldova
- Philippines − Donations made from Moscow in October 2017.
- Russia − Limited numbers still in service as of 2022.
- Turkmenistan
- Ukraine
- Uzbekistan
- Vietnam

=== Former ===
- Artsakh
- Democratic Republic of Afghanistan
- Georgia − Used in the 1990s, replaced by more modern Kevlar helmets.
- Islamic Republic of Afghanistan
- Lithuania
- Mongolia
- Nicaragua
- North Vietnam
- Ba'athist Syria
- Soviet Union - Used extensively during the Soviet-Afghan war

=== States with limited recognition ===
- South Ossetia
- Donetsk People's Republic - Used during the War in Donbas and the Russo-Ukrainian war (2022–present)
- Luhansk People's Republic - Used during the War in Donbas and the Russo-Ukrainian war (2022–present)

=== Non-State Actors ===
- Russian Orthodox Army

== Bibliography ==
- Galeotti, Mark (2023). Russia's Five-Day War: The invasion of Georgia, August 2008. Bloomsbury Publishing. ISBN 978-1-4728-5097-3.
- Galeotti, Mark (2025). Putin's Mercenaries, 2013–24. Bloomsbury Publishing. ISBN 978-1472866264.
- Clawson, Robert W. (2002). Russian Helmets: From Kaska to Stalshlyem, 1916-2001. R.J. Bender Pub. ISBN 978-0-912138-90-9.
