= 6B3 ballistic vest =

Ballistic vest of the Soviet Armed Forces

6B3
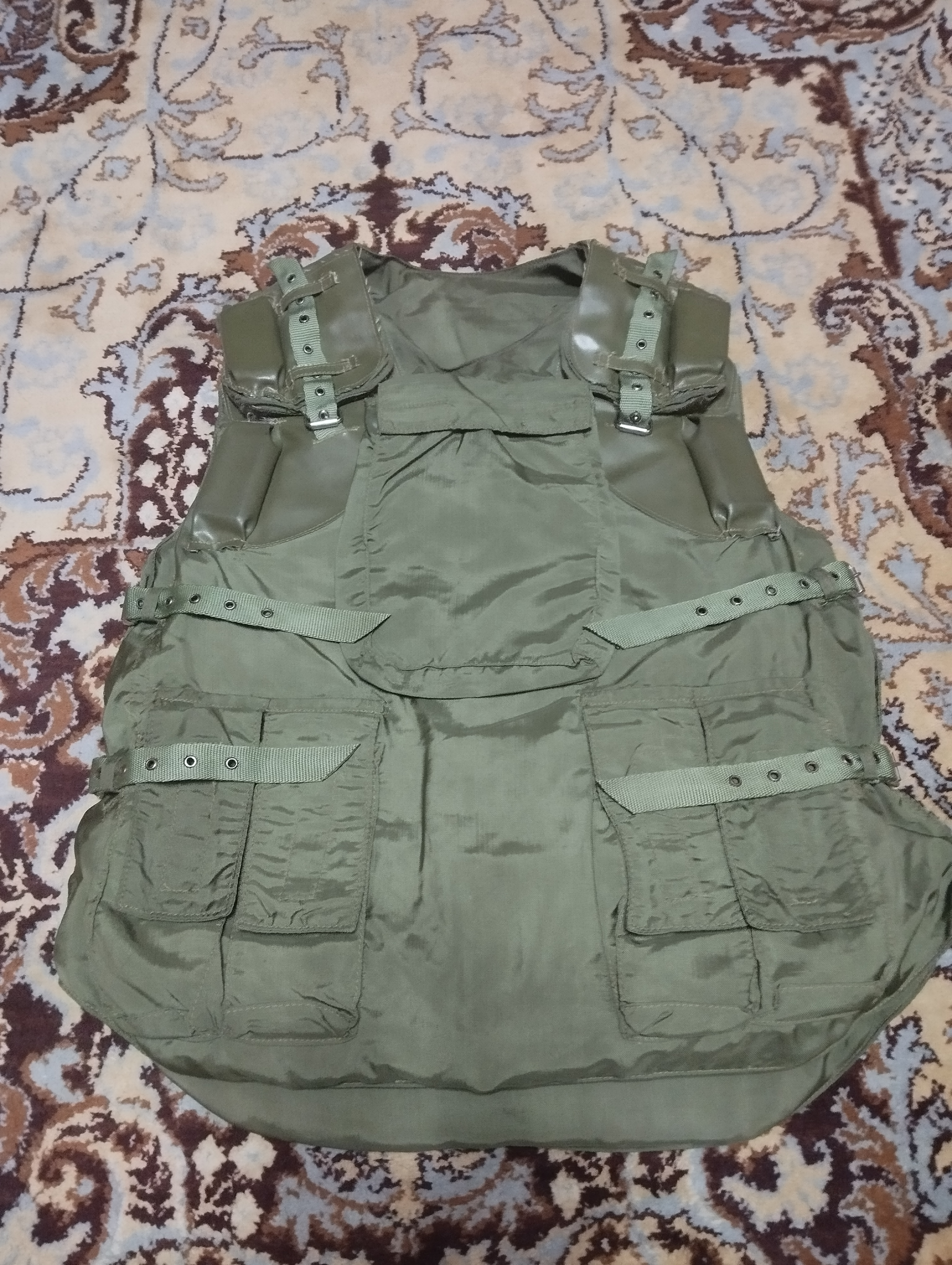
- 6B3 vest
- Type: Ballistic vest
- Place of origin: Soviet Union

Service history
- In service: 6B3T: 1983-? 6B3TM-01: 1985-?
- Used by: Soviet Armed Forces
- Wars: Soviet-Afghan war East Prigorodny conflict First Chechen War; Second Chechen War; War in Donbas

Production history
- Designer: NII Stali

Specifications
- Weight: 6B3T: 12.2 kg 6B3TM-01: 8.2 kg.

The 6B3 (Russian: 6Б3) is a ballistic vest of the Soviet Armed Forces. It was the first widely issued and mass produced ballistic vest rated to stop assault rifle rounds. It was created by NII Stali after Soviet troops in Afghanistan noted the lack of protection against rifle rounds that the 6B2 ballistic vest provided.

== History ==
After the Soviet army started to issue 6B2 body armor to the troops in Afghanistan, a number of downsides were noticed. Firstly, and most importantly, the vest only provided good protection against shrapnel, but not rifle rounds. As such, engineers at NII Stali set out to create an improved ballistic vest, with higher protective characteristics. In 1983, by resolution of the Central Committee and the Council of Ministers of the USSR NII Stali was designated as a lead coordinator of all developments in the realm of personal protection.

6B3T armor offered better protection compared to 6B2 and got adopted in 1983, and modernized versions with differentiated protection on front and back and better fabric cover - 6B3TM and 6B3TM-01 were adopted in 1985.

== Design ==
The vest consists of chest and back parts. On the shoulders they connect via belt-buckle fasteners, which make it possible to make height adjustments.

The protection itself consists of titanium armor elements inside of the so-called mounting plate (монтажная плата). The fabric cover of the vest has four pockets for AK mags (AK stripper clips on 6B3T) on the front, four slots for hand grenades on the back, and two big pouches on front and back for other storage.

=== Protective characteristics ===
Protection of 6B3TM-01 vest consists of titanium plates inside of the aramid pockets both in the front and in the back. The front plates are made out of 6.5 mm thick VT-23 titanium, called ADU-605T-83 (АДУ-605Т-83). It provided protection against 7.62x39 PS cartridge fired from an AKM at 10 meters, 5.45x39 PS (7N6) from an AK-74 at 35 meters, 5.56x45 FMJ (M193) from an M16A1 at 100 meters, and 7.62x54R LPS from an SVD at 150 meters. The back plates are made out of 1.25 mm thick VT-14 titanium, called ADU-605-80 (АДУ-605-80), the same material as the 6B2 vest.

It could reasonably protect against TT and Makarov pistols. Both front and back were further protected by aramid (TSVM DZh-1) fabric liner (30 layers of fabric).

There are several variants of 6B3 body armor:

- 6B3T - (T stands for titanium) original version adopted in 1983. Offers all round protection with 6.5mm plates.
- 6B3TM - modernized version adopted in 1985. Changes were mostly done to fabric cover of the vest (Replacing pouches for AK stripper clips for AK mags pouches). Offers same protection as 6B3T. Weighs 12.2 kg.
- 6B3TM-01 - modernized version adopted in 1985. Has the same protection as 6B3TM on the front, but thinner, lighter plates on the back. The most widely produced variant of 6B3. Weighs 8.2 kg.
- 6B3TM-01M - upgrade of existing vests by "Zyuratkul" company in the 1990s.

== Users ==
=== Former users ===
- Soviet Union
- Russia
- Ukraine

== Gallery ==
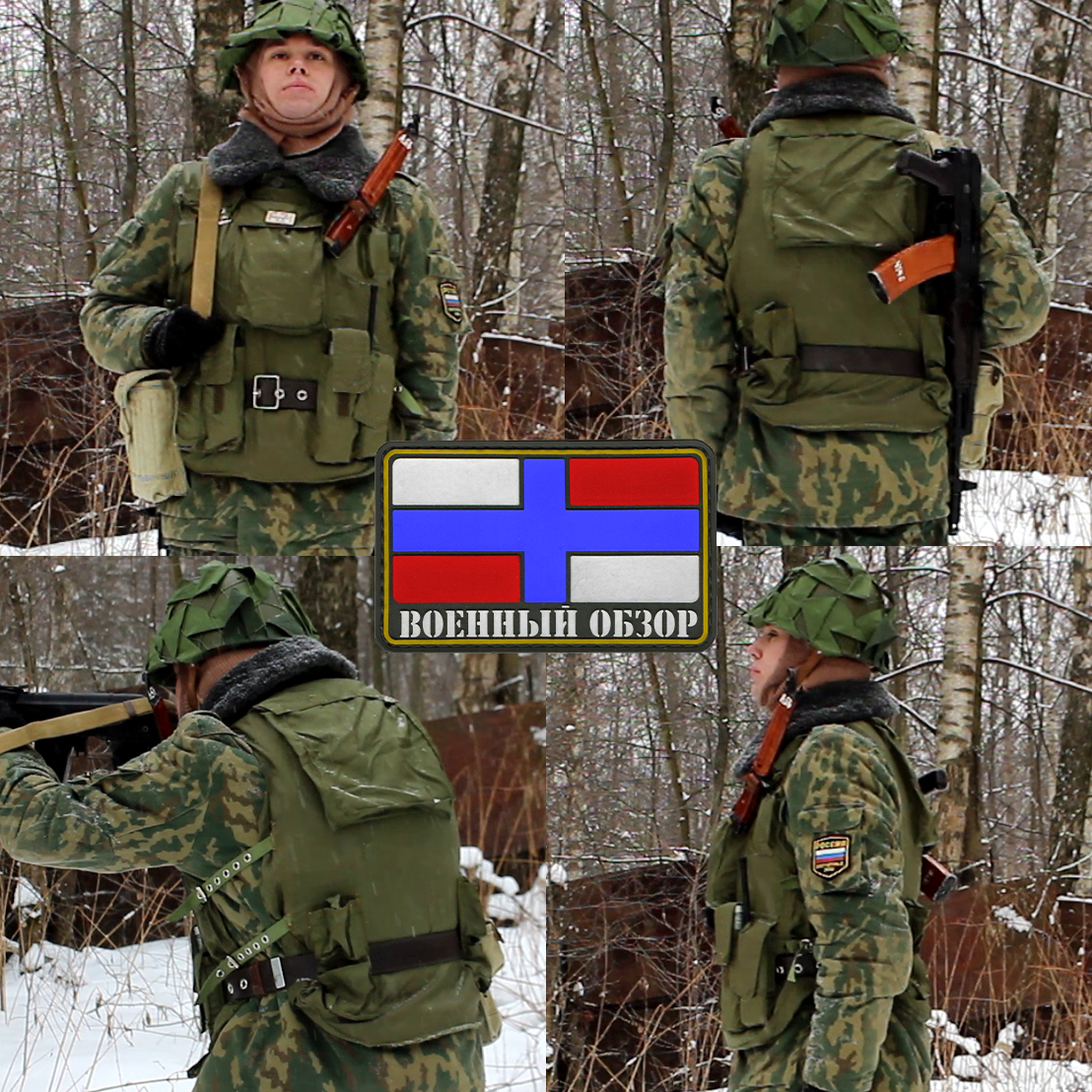
Ivan Nikolayev in a 6B3TM-01 ballistic vest

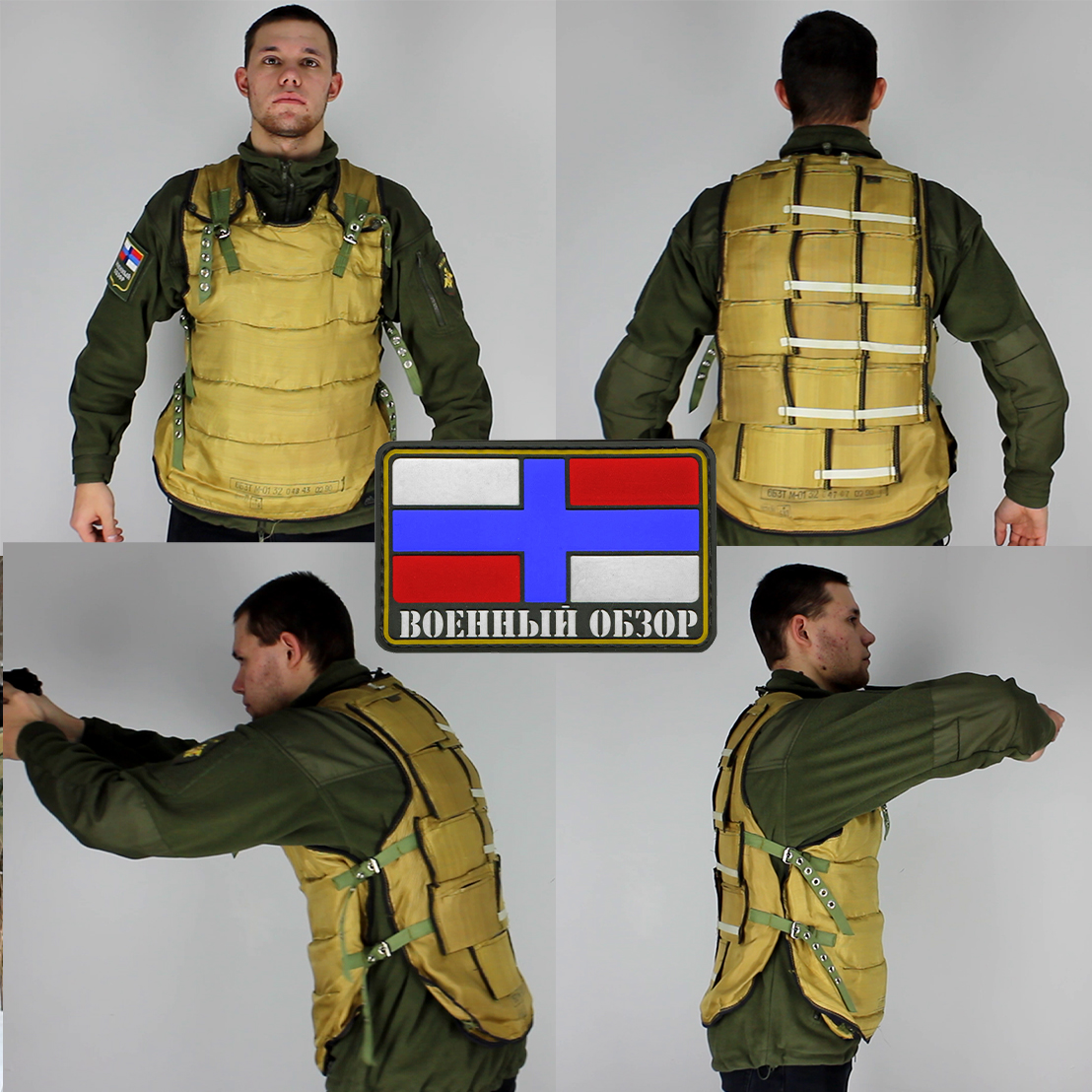
Ivan Nikolayev in 6B3TM-01 ballistic vest without fabric cover. Slots for titanium plates can clearly be seen.

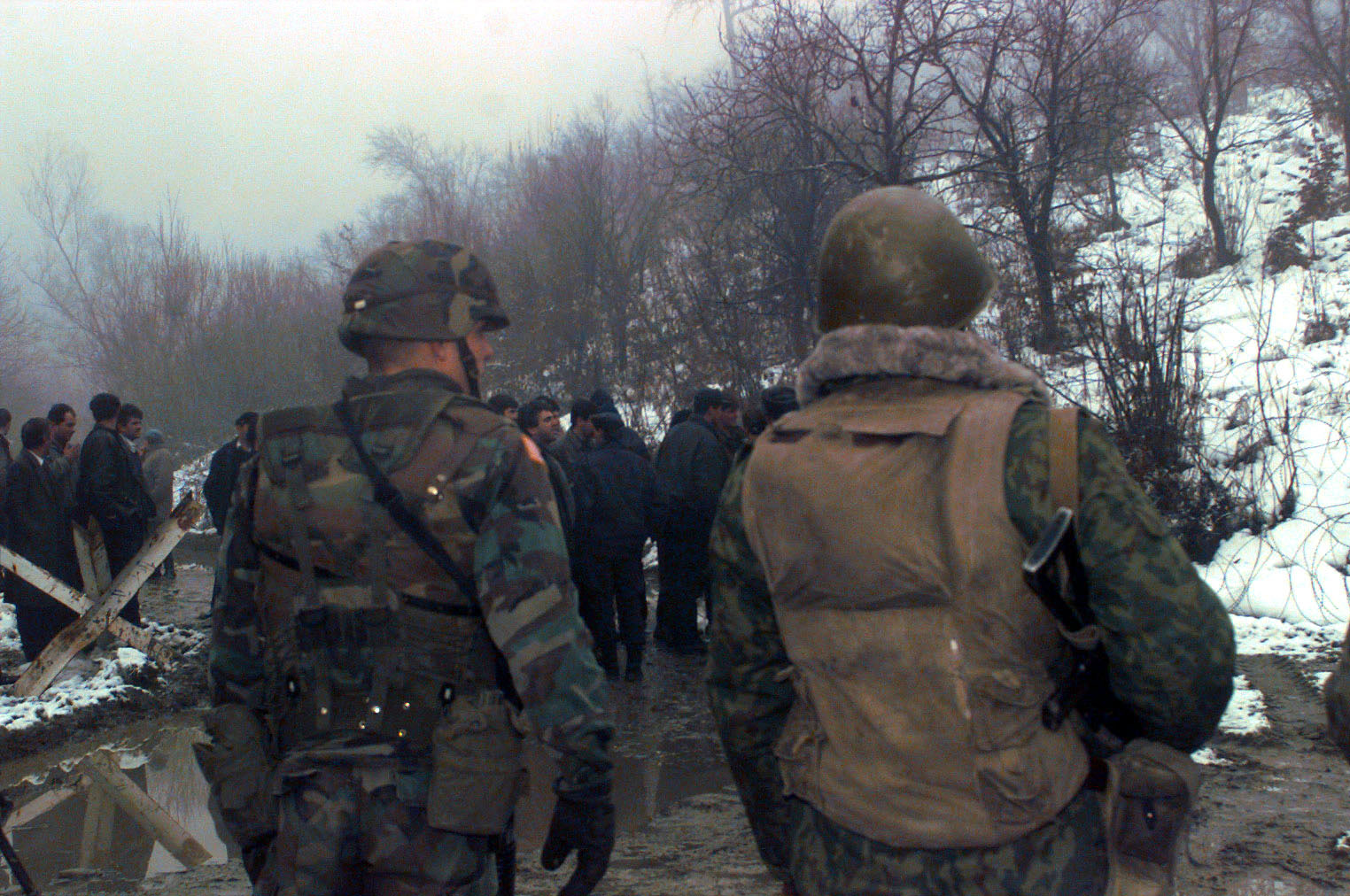
Russian soldier in Bosnia (right) wearing 6B3 armor
