= Scientific Research Institute of Steel =

Russian research institute

Coordinates: 55.8919°N 37.5522°E

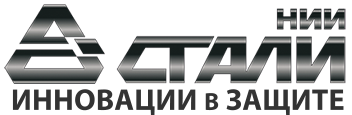
Logo of NII Stali

The Scientific Research Institute of Steel (Russian: Научно-исследовательский институт стали), also known as NII Stali (Russian: НИИ стали), is a Russian research institute (NII) located in the capital city of Moscow. The institute occupies an area of 64,000 m^{2}, including production areas of 40,000 m^{2}.

It was founded in 1942 by the People's Commissariat of the Tank Industry of the USSR as the Moscow Group of Research Institute No. 48 to develop tank armor. The company was renamed into the All-Union Scientific Research Institute of Steel in 1967 before it became a joint-stock company and settled into its present name in 1993. It received an Order of the Red Banner of Labor award in 1986.

The company is known for its military products, including tank armor and military helmets. For example, it made a new type of armor for the T-14 Armata. Since 2023, it also produces anti-fragmentation blankets. The institute is subject to sanctions in Ukraine.
