= Brish =

Brish may refer to:

- Alexei Brish (born 1986), Russian hockey player
- Arkady Brish (1917–2016), Soviet physicist
- William M. Brish (1906–1999), American public administrator
- Brish Run, a tributary of Pine Creek in Pennsylvania, United States

== See also ==
- Briche (disambiguation)
