= Directorate of Military Representatives of the Ministry of Defense of the Russian Federation =

- Управление военных представительств Министерства обороны Российской Федерации
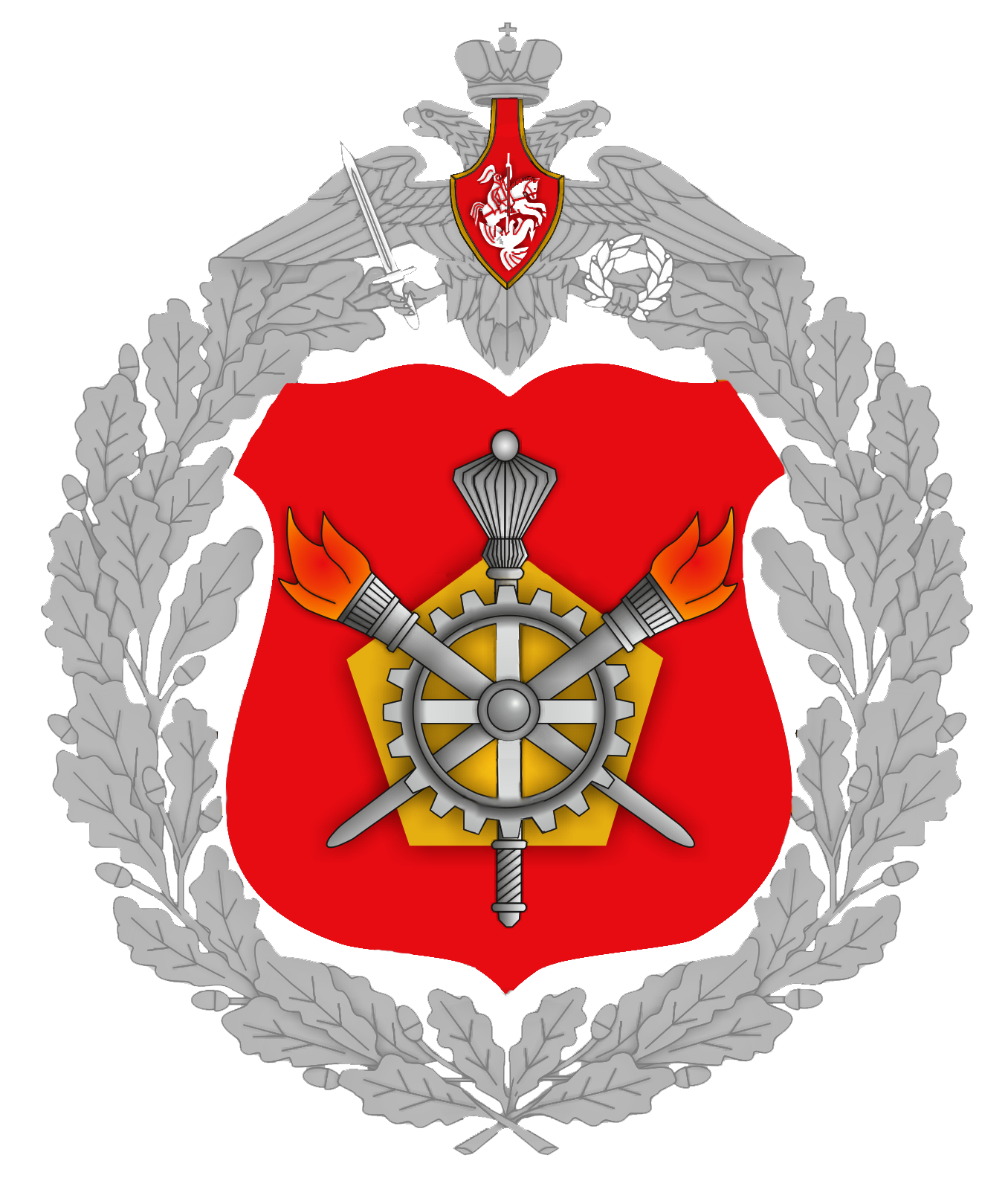
- Great emblem

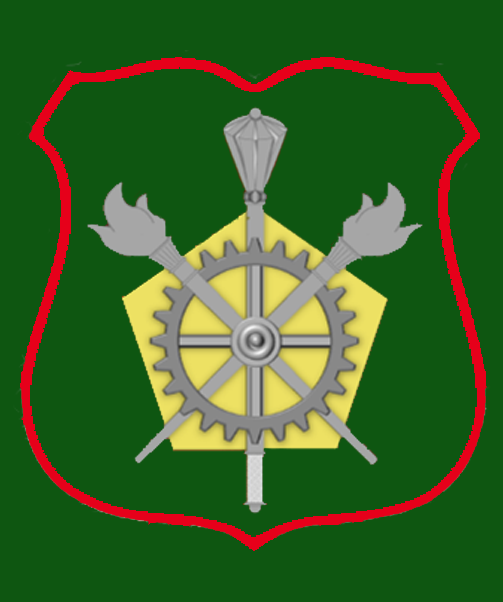
- Sleeve insignia

Agency overview
- Formed: 1 June 2005
- Headquarters: Moscow
- Minister responsible: Andrey Belousov, Minister of Defence
- Agency executive: Oleg Stepanov, Director
- Website: structure.mil.ru/structure/ministry_of_defence/details.htm?id=9722%40egOrganization

Directorate of Military Representatives of the Ministry of Defense of the Russian Federation (Russian: Управление военных представительств Министерства обороны Российской Федерации) is a military command body within the structure of the Ministry of Defense of the Russian Federation designed to organize work on quality control and acceptance of weapons, military and special equipment, quality control and acceptance of military products intended for export, civil aviation equipment and space systems and complexes for scientific, socio-economic and commercial purposes. The Directorate of Military Representatives reports to the Deputy Minister of Defense of the Russian Federation responsible for organizing military-technical support for troops. By order of the Deputy Minister of Defense of the Russian Federation dated September 15, 2022 No. 870, the date of the annual holiday of the unit is set to December 27.

== History ==
In 1941, on the eve of the Great Patriotic War, the Armament Order Chief Services were created under the branches of the Red Army, later renamed the Armament and Military Equipment Order and Supply Directorates. Thanks to their activities during the war, it was possible to adopt new generations of military equipment: tanks, aircraft, warships, and continuously improve them taking into account the experience of combat operations.

Throughout the Soviet period and up until 2005, the Armament and Military Equipment Order and Supply Directorates performed the functions of the general customer of the Ministry of Defense and managed the customer's representative offices (later military representative offices) subordinate to them at defense industry organizations.

By Directive of the Chief of the General Staff of the Russian Armed Forces dated April 29, 2005 No. 314/5/1256, from June 1, 2005, military missions of the Ministry of Defense of the Russian Federation were excluded from the composition of the branches (arms) of the Russian Armed Forces, the main and central directorates of the Ministry of Defense of the Russian Federation and subordinated to the Chief of Armaments of the Russian Armed Forces and Deputy Minister of Defense of the Russian Federation (at that time, General of the Army Alexey Moskovsky).

The organization of regulatory and methodological support for the activities of military missions of the Ministry of Defense, as well as the management of military missions subordinated to the Chief of Armaments of the Armed Forces of the Russian Federation - Deputy Minister of Defense of the Russian Federation, were assigned to the newly formed Directorate of Military Missions of the Ministry of Defense of the Russian Federation.

The tasks and functions of the formed Directorate were defined by the Regulation on the Directorate of Military Representatives of the Ministry of Defense of the Russian Federation, approved by the order of the Chief of Armaments of the Armed Forces of the Russian Federation and Deputy Minister of Defense of the Russian Federation dated April 21, 2005 No. 5.

Technical management of military representatives continued to be carried out by the Directorates of Orders and Supplies according to the ownership of products. The activities of the Directorate of Military Representatives on interaction with the Directorates of Orders and Supplies were coordinated by the Head of the Directorate of the Chief of Armaments - Deputy Chief of Armaments of the Armed Forces of the Russian Federation.

In 2010, the Directorates of Orders and Supplies were abolished. Their functions, in terms of preparation for the placement and placement of tasks of the state defense order, were assumed by the newly formed Department of the Ministry of Defense of the Russian Federation for the Provision of the State Defense Order. The function of managing military missions was completely transferred to the Directorate of Military Missions, which, as of November 15, 2012, was reassigned directly to the Deputy Minister of Defense of the Russian Federation, responsible for organizing military-technical support for troops (at that time, Yury Borisov).

== Duties ==
- Organization of work on quality control and acceptance of military and military equipment, military supplies, civil aviation equipment and space systems and complexes for scientific, socio-economic and commercial purposes, supplied to the Armed Forces and, in accordance with the established procedure, to other customers, as well as participation in the development of measures to improve the quality of military and military equipment, military supplies, civil aviation equipment and space systems and complexes for scientific, socio-economic and commercial purposes;
- Organization and control of the activities of military missions;
- Development, in accordance with the established procedure, of drafts of relevant legal acts and other documents regulating the areas of activity of military missions;
- Assignment of military missions to industrial organizations;
- Organization of the issuance by military missions of opinions on the price of military products;
- Monitoring the release and quality of military and military equipment;
- Interaction with interested military command bodies on issues of development and adoption of measures in the event of preconditions for the disruption of the fulfillment of government contracts (contracts) or the delivery of substandard products to the consumer (customers);
- Organization of contractual work on quality control and acceptance of products for other customers.
