= 6B45 ballistic vest =

Standard issue armor of Russian army

6B45
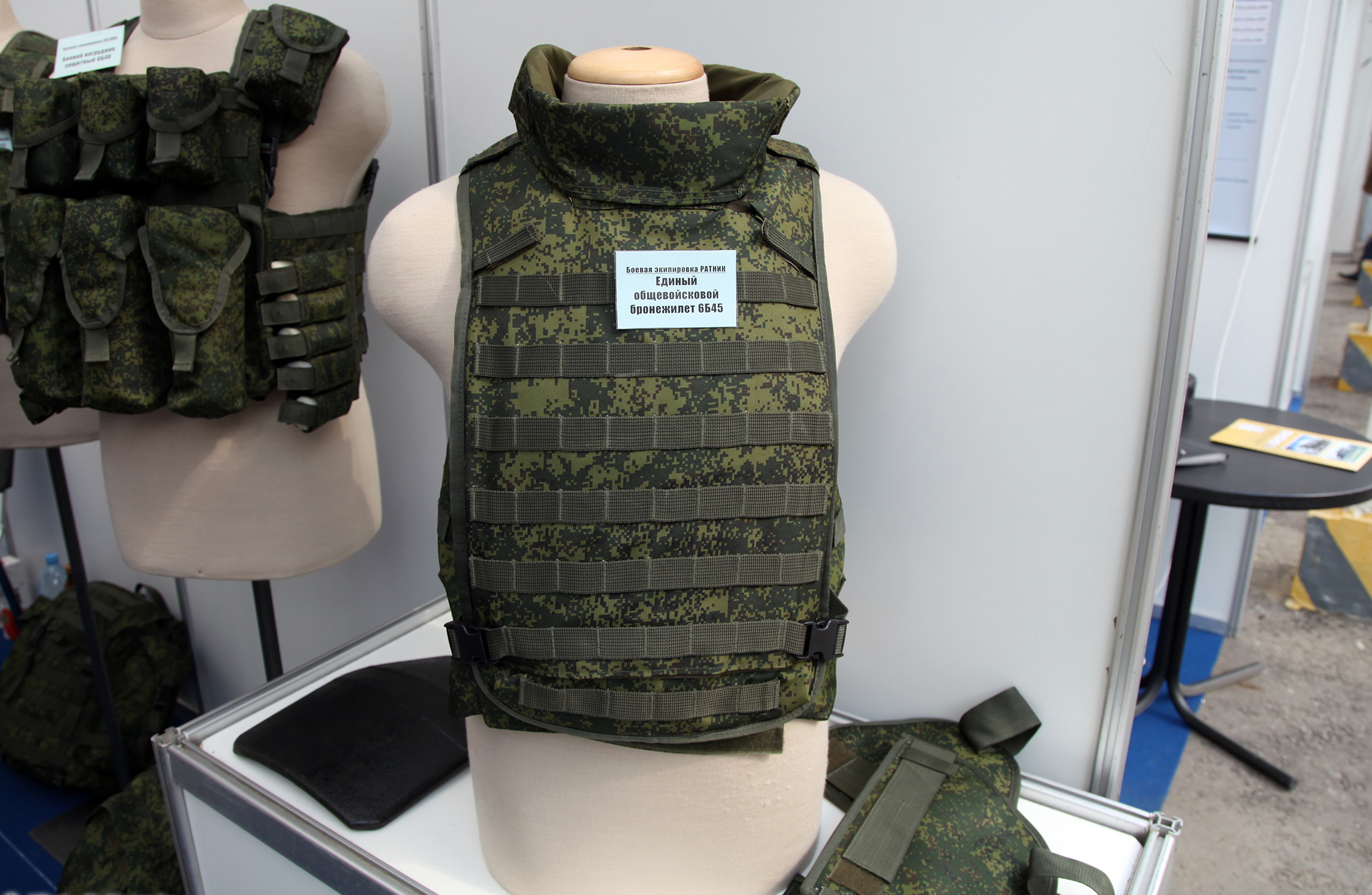
- 6B45 body armor in basic configuration with a Granit ballistic plate on the left
- Type: Bulletproof vest
- Place of origin: Russian Federation

Service history
- In service: 2014-present
- Used by: Russian Armed Forces; Syrian Armed Forces
- Wars: Syrian civil war Russo-Ukraine War

Production history
- Designer: Techinkom

Specifications
- Weight: 8 kg in basic configuration

The 6B45 (Russian: 6Б45) is a standard ballistic vest of the Armed Forces of the Russian Federation. It is a part of Ratnik infantry combat system. It was adopted in 2014 as a replacement for the 6B23 vest. The 6B45 vest has been developed by Techinkom company located in Saint Petersburg.

The 6B45 body armor has a kevlar base as well as pockets on both the front back and sides which allow for added ballistic plates. MOLLE webbing on the front and back allow for the attachment of pouches.

The 6B45 is a further modification of the 6B43 vest.

== History ==
In 2008-2009, on instructions from the Russian Ministry of Defence, Techinkom developed the assault body armor vest 6B43, which successfully passed state tests and was mass-produced until 2014. In 2012, the company joined the work on the Ratnik program and in 2015, the 6B45 combined arms body armor was adopted as standard armor.

The 6B45 differs from 6B43 in a few aspects, most important of which is sewn-in aramid, as well as Fastex buckles being replaced by Velcro, and the addition of a drag handle. In the 6B45 body armor, aramid is already sewn in from the very beginning.

== Design ==
The basic issued variant of the 6B45 has a weight of approximately 8 kg. The basic issued variant of the body armor includes: a body armor cover (with MOLLE system on front sides and back), a collar protecting against fragments, anti-fragmentation bags on the sides with a fairly large protection area, rear and front class 5A armor plates, an emergency release device and a removable ventilation and shock-absorbing system. It offers protection equivalent to GOST 5A, capable of withstanding hits of 7.62x39 57-BZ-231 (BZ API) armor-piercing incendiary bullets fired from an AK. The vest is compatible with a range of Granit plates, capable of providing up to class 6A protection. The armor plates are made from a layer of ceramic tiles and a composite substrate. Ceramics are characterized by very high hardness and relatively low weight.

The vest features more pronounced shoulder pads than on the 6B23 for comfortable resting of the rifle butt against the shoulder and preventing it from slipping during shooting and aiming. A major improvement over previous armor is the 6B45 collar. When used correctly, it does not interfere with turning your head and ensures comfortable wearing of the vest. It is also of note that the collar can be raised and lowered depending on the situation.

=== Variants ===
There are three variants of the 6B45 vest:

Light variant comprises frontal and spinal sections with no Granit armoured plates installed. It has NIJ II/BR2 EN 1063 protection level.

Medium variant comprises frontal and spinal sections reinforced by Granit hard plates and side/shoulder soft armour. In such configuration, the 6B45 vest provides NIJ III/BR6 EN 1063 protection (protection against 7.62mm FMJ M80 bullets).

Heavy 6B45 variant comprises frontal and spinal sections (each section is reinforced with two Granit hard plates) and side/shoulder/neck/groin soft protection. Such variant is intended for assault troops as it protects against 7.62mm armour-piercing bullets (NIJ IV/BR7 EN 1063 protection level).

== Gallery ==
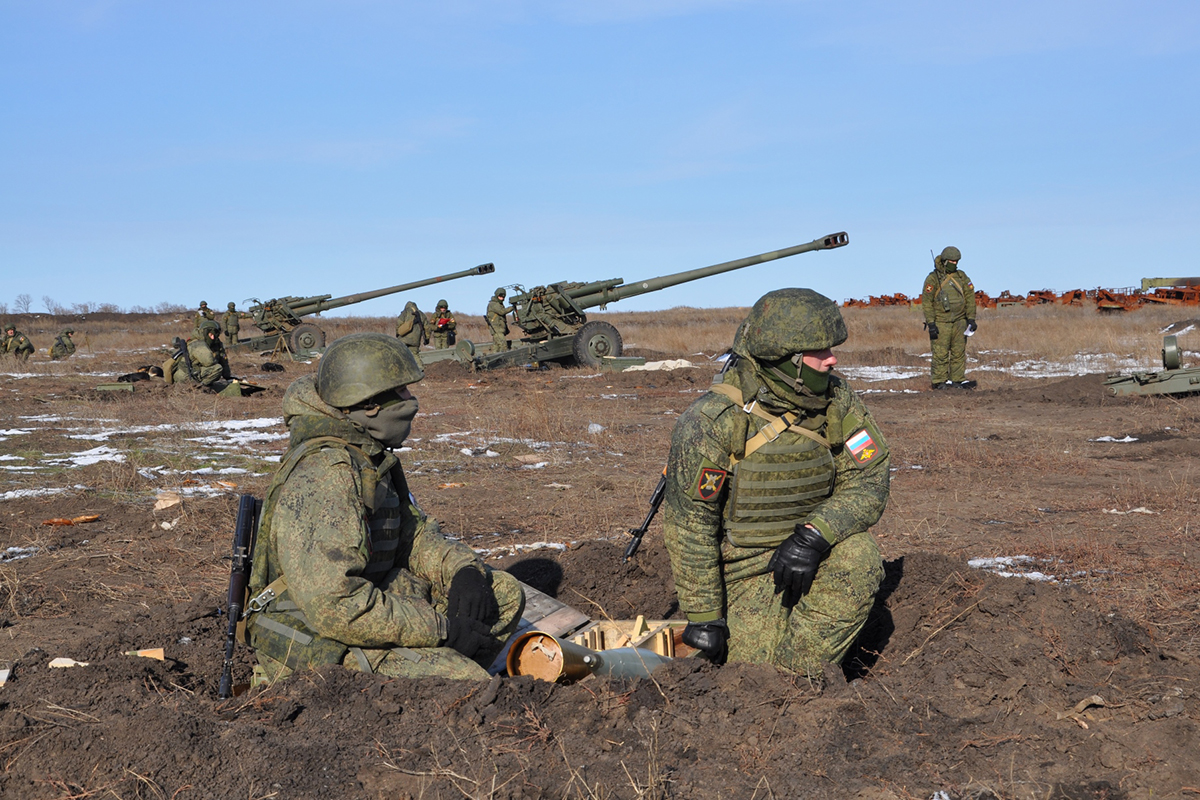
Soldiers of 150th Motor Rifle Division wearing 6B45 armor in 2018

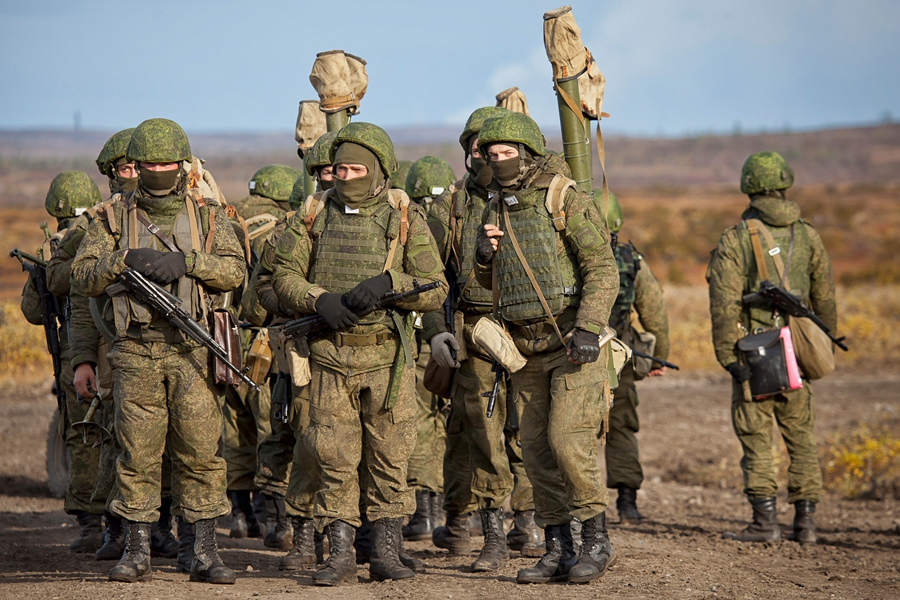
Soldiers of the Arctic brigade wearing 6B45

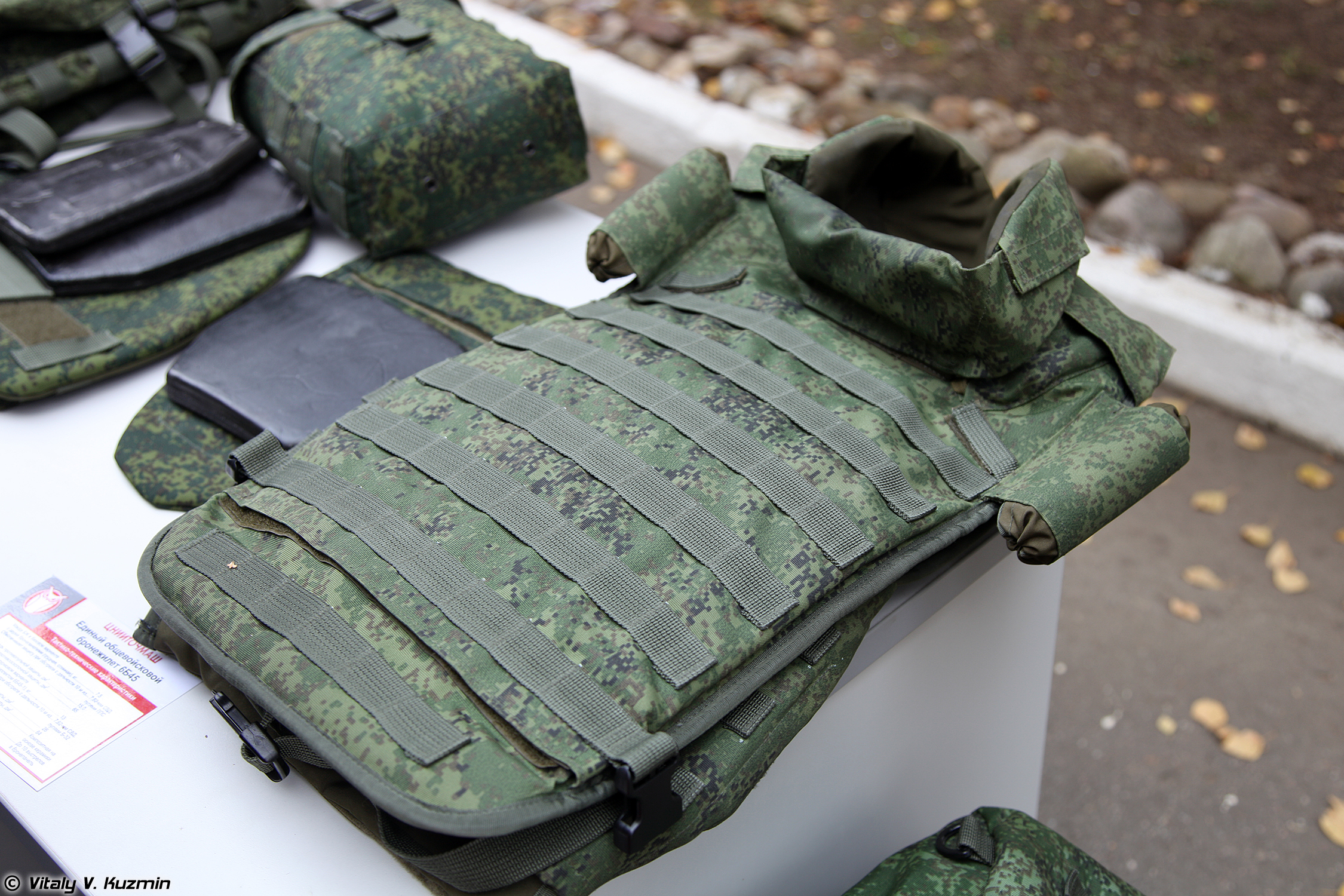
6B45 bulletproof vest

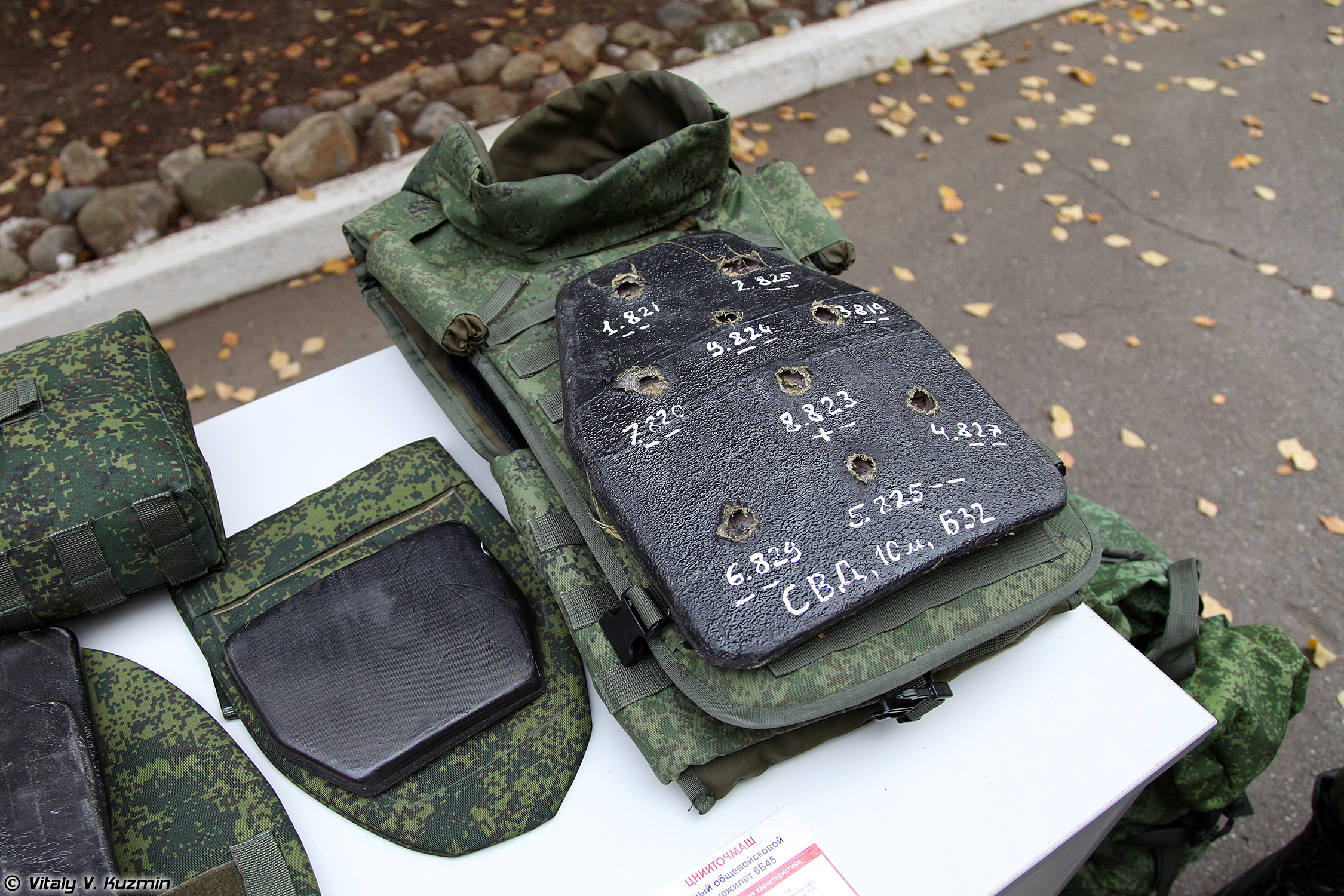
Granit ceramic plate for 6B45 with impacts from 7.62x54R B32 armor piercing rounds

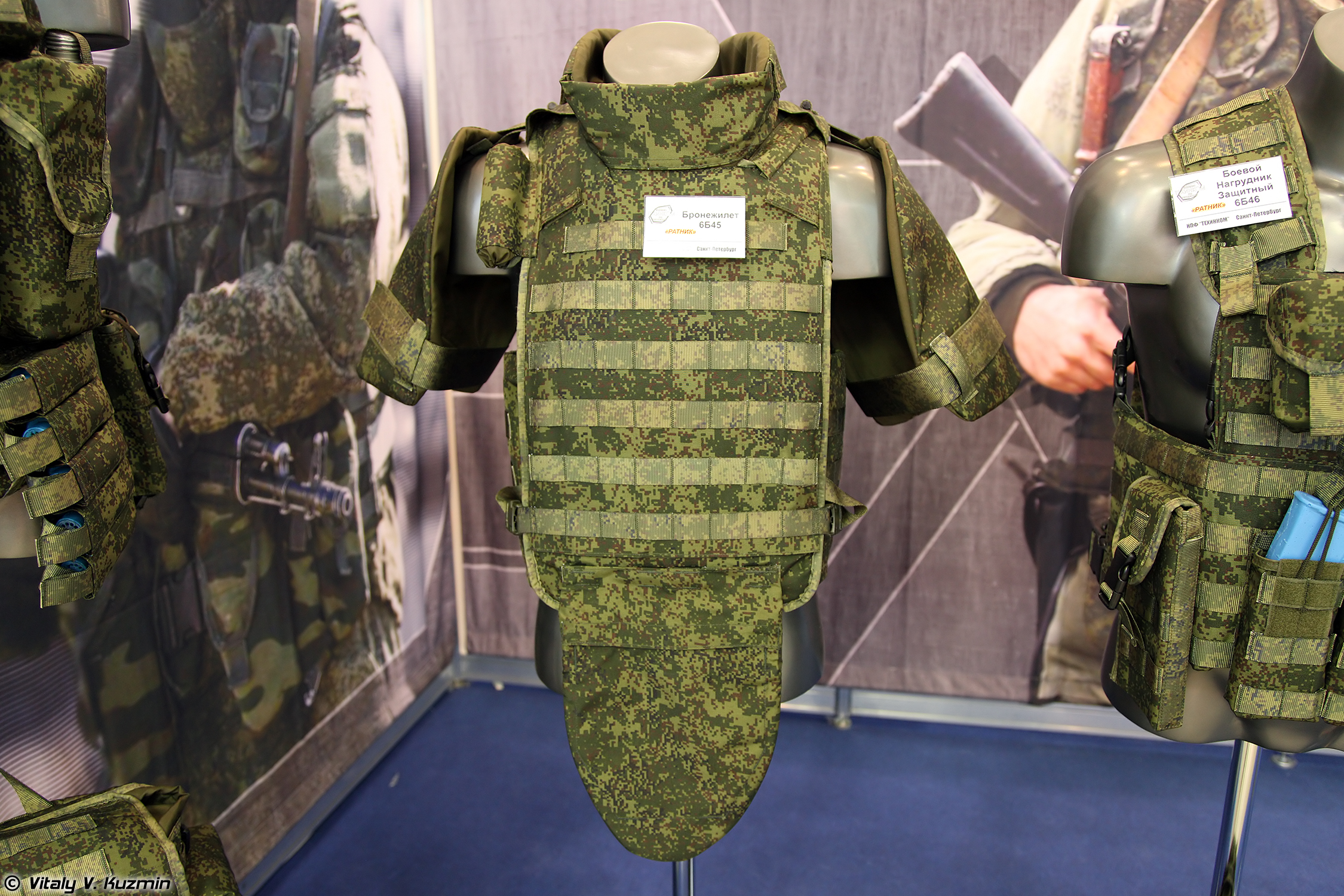
Full version with addon armor for arms and pelvis region
