= Alexey Moskovsky =

Russian general

- Алексей Московский
- Born: 10 March 1947 (age 79); Smolensk, Russian SSR
- Education: Govorov Military Engineering Radiotechnical Academy of Air Defense; General Staff Military Academy; Novosibirsk State University
- Military career
- Allegiance: Soviet Union; Russia
- Branch: Soviet Armed Forces; Russian Armed Forces
- Rank: Army general
- Awards: Hero of the Russian Federation; Order "For Merit to the Fatherland"

Alexey Mikhailovich Moskovsky (Russian: Алексей Михайлович Московский; born March 10, 1947 in Smolensk) is a Russian military figure, General of the Army (June 12, 2004), full member of the Russian Academy of Natural Sciences (1995), corresponding member of the Russian Academy of Rocket and Artillery Sciences (2004), Doctor of Technical Sciences (2007).

== Biography ==
He was conscripted to the Armed Forces of the USSR in 1965.

He graduated from the Kiev Higher Engineering Radiotechnical School of Air Defense (1970), the Govorov Military Engineering Radiotechnical Academy of Air Defense (1984), Novosibirsk State University (1976), Higher Defense Courses at the Military Academy of the General Staff (1991).

He worked in the field of creation, testing, development, production and operation of weapons and military equipment.

After graduating from the school in 1970, he served as a test engineer at the 10th State Test Site of Anti-Missile Defense "Sary-Shagan", testing anti-aircraft missile systems. From 1976 he served successively as engineer, senior engineer, deputy head of department, head of department, deputy head of the 4th Directorate (anti-aircraft equipment) in the 4th Main Directorate of the Soviet Ministry of Defense. From 1985 to 1991 he served as Head of Sector and Deputy Head of Department in the State Commission of the Council of Ministers of the USSR on Military-Industrial Issues (MIC).

From 1991 he served as First Deputy and from 1992 he served as Chief of the 4th Main Directorate (GU Armaments) of the Air and Missile Defense Forces of the country. In 1994, he was appointed First Deputy Chief of Armaments of the Armed Forces of the Russian Federation. From 1997 he served as Deputy State Military Inspector and Secretary of the Defense Council of Russia. From May 1998 he served as Deputy Secretary of the Security Council of Russia. He supervised security issues in the economic, industrial, including defense-industrial, military-technical and scientific spheres, in the sphere of defense and dual-use technologies, development and implementation of the main provisions of the Russian Federation policy in these spheres. From March 2001 to April 2007 he served as Chief of Armaments of the Russian Armed Forces and Deputy Minister of Defense of the Russian Federation. He was promoted to Lieutenant General on 10th of June 1994.

For several years, he was a member of the Commission under the President of the Russian Federation on military-technical cooperation with foreign states (1999-2001) and a number of government commissions: from 1998 to 2002 the Interdepartmental Commission for Optimization of State Defense Orders, from 1999 to 2006 - the Commission of the Government of Russia on the Military-Industrial Complex, from 2003 to 2007 - the Government Commission for Administrative Reform, since 2006 member of the Military-Industrial Commission under the Government of Russia.

On March 28, 2001, he was appointed to the post of Deputy Minister of Defense of the Russian Federation and Chief of Armaments of the Russian Armed Frce. The military rank of General of the Army was awarded by the decree of the President of Russia Vladimir Putin dated June 12, 2004. Since April 19, 2007 — in the reserve, dismissed upon reaching the maximum age for military service. The report on the extension of military service was not satisfied.

He also served as director of the Institute of Economic Security and Strategic Planning of the Financial University under the Government of the Russian Federation.

He is laureate of the 1995 State Prize of the Russian Federation in the field of Science and Technology, the 2006 State Prize of Russia named after Marshal of the Soviet Union G.K. Zhukov in the field of creation of weapons and military equipment (for the development and implementation of complex technology in the field of creation of weapons models that make a significant contribution to strengthening the national security and defense capability of the state), Russian Government Prizes in 2000 and 2002 for the development and creation of new equipment. Has a letter of gratitude from the President of the Russian Federation for services in the field of ensuring national security of Russia (2004). He is married and has two sons.

=== Accident on the Moscow Small Ring Road ===
On July 17, 2005, Aleksey Moskovsky, driving his Volkswagen Passat, was returning from his dacha in the Pushkinsky District of the Moscow Oblast at the 26th kilometer of the Moscow Small Ring Road at 22:50 Moscow time when he crossed the solid dividing strip, drove into the oncoming traffic lane and collided head-on with a VAZ-2108, in which there was a twenty-eight-year-old resident of the Tyumen Region, a woman and a two-year-old girl. As a result of the collision, Moskovsky, his wife, who was traveling with him, and everyone else in the VAZ-2108 received traumatic brain injuries. Aleksey Mikhailovich also had a concussion, a fractured left femur and shin. His wife had head injuries and fractured fingers. The driver of the VAZ-2108 also received a fractured left femur and lacerations all over his body. The girl, in addition to a traumatic brain injury, had a concussion. She and the woman in the VAZ-2108 were taken to intensive care. According to the traffic police officers who were the first to arrive at the scene of the accident, the general and his wife were saved by the car's protection and their injuries were not life-threatening.

== Awards ==
- Order of Honour (2007)
- Order "For Service to the Homeland in the Armed Forces of the USSR" 3rd degree (1985)
- State Prize of the Russian Federation in Science and Technology (1995)
- Zhukov State Prize of the Russian Federation (2006)
- Prizes of the Government of Russia in Science and Technology (2000, 2002)
- Gratitude from the President of the Russian Federation
- Jubilee Medal "300 Years of the Russian Navy"
- Medal "In Commemoration of the 850th Anniversary of Moscow"
- Medal "Veteran of the Armed Forces of the USSR"
- Medal "For Distinction in Military Service"
- Jubilee Medal "50 Years of the Armed Forces of the USSR"
- Jubilee Medal "60 Years of the Armed Forces of the USSR"
- Jubilee Medal "70 Years of the Armed Forces of the USSR"
- Medal "For Impeccable Service"
- Medal "200 years to the MVD of Russia
