= 6B47 helmet =

Russian aramid combat helmet

6B47
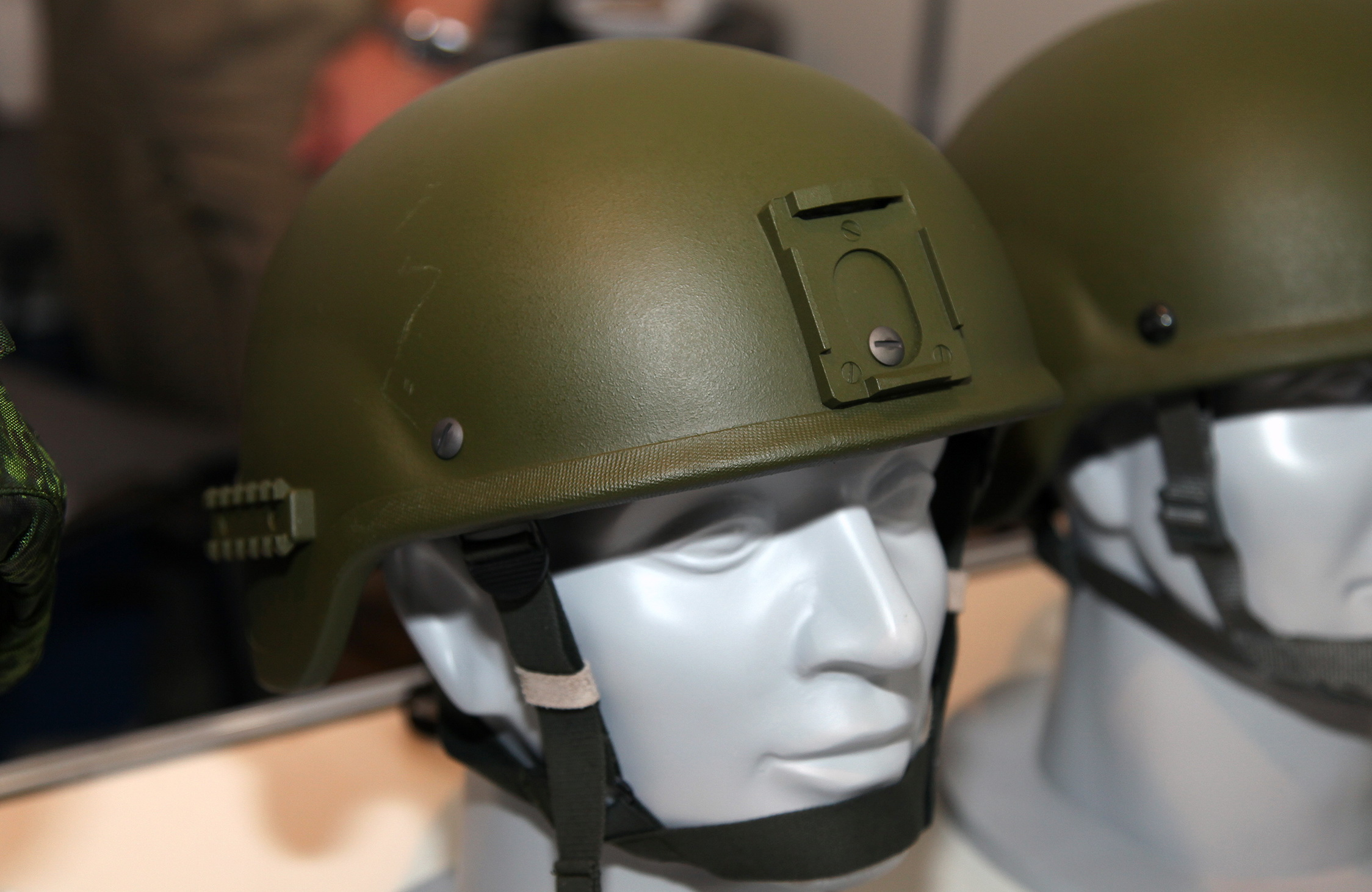
- 6B47 helmet at the Ministry of Defence Innovation Day 2013
- Type: Combat helmet
- Place of origin: Russian Federation

Service history
- Used by: See Users
- Wars: Syrian Civil War; Russo-Ukrainian War

Production history
- Designer: Armokom
- Designed: 2011
- Manufacturer: Armokom
- Produced: 2013-present

Specifications
- Weight: ≤ 1 kg

The 6B47 is a standard ballistic helmet of the Armed Forces of the Russian Federation. Developed by Armokom, it is a part of the Ratnik infantry combat system.

== History ==
It was reported to be seen in Syria.

== Design ==
The 6B47 was developed by Armokom from 2011 onwards. The company had previously developed and produced the 6B7-1 and 6B7-1M helmets for the Russian army.

The 6B47 helmet provides protection from:

- 9-mm 57-N-181S bullets from a PM pistol from a distance of 5 meters;
- fragment simulators (steel balls with a diameter of 6.3 mm and a mass of 1.05 g) at a speed of no more than 630 m/s.

The helmet provides the ability to use standard communications equipment, and differs from previous helmets in its ability to mount night vision devices and other equipment. It retains its protective properties at temperatures from −50 to +50 °C. Its guaranteed shelf life is at least 8 years, of which the guaranteed service life is at least 5 years.

According to Armocom deputy general director Oleg Faustov, the 6B47 is the lightest helmet made by the company.

== Users ==
=== Current ===
- Egypt
- Russia

=== Former ===
- Ba'athist Syria

=== Non-state actors ===
- Redut - In use by members of the Redut Private military company (PMC) in the Russo-Ukrainian war (2022–present)

== Gallery ==
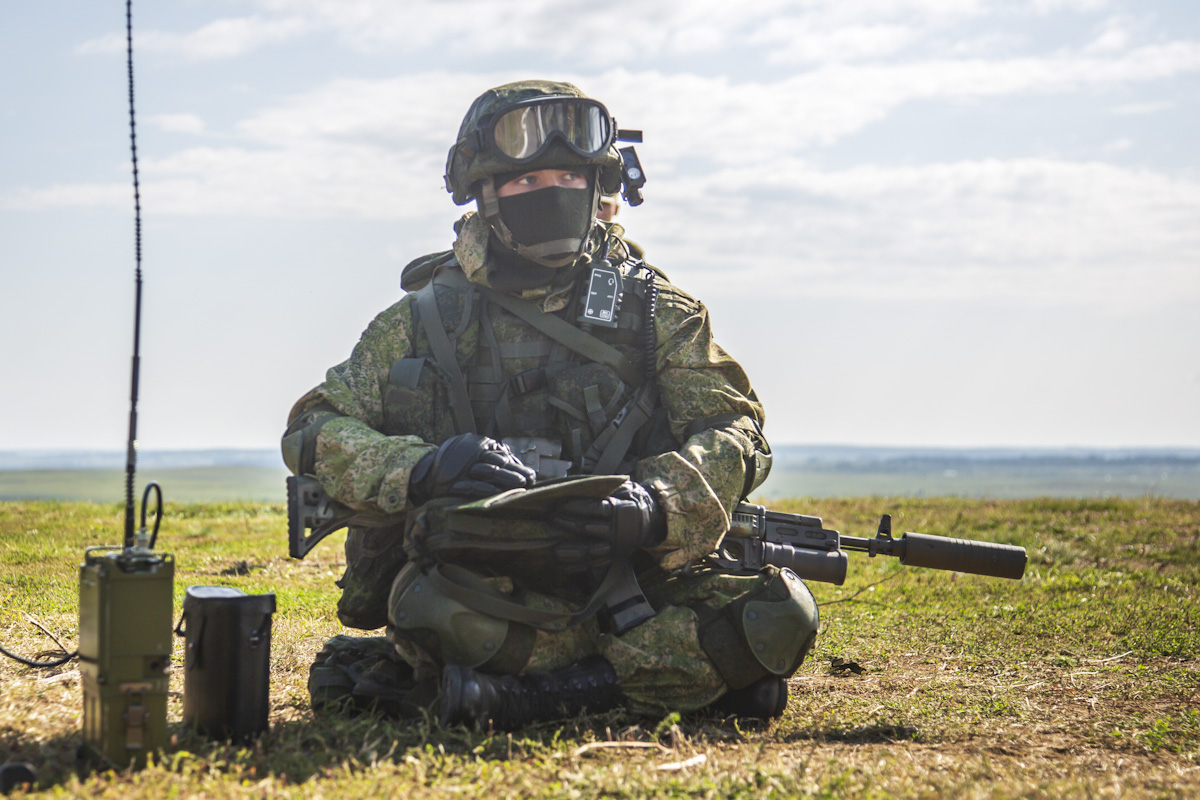
Russian soldier during Peace Mission 2018 wearing 6B47 helmet with 6B50 glasses

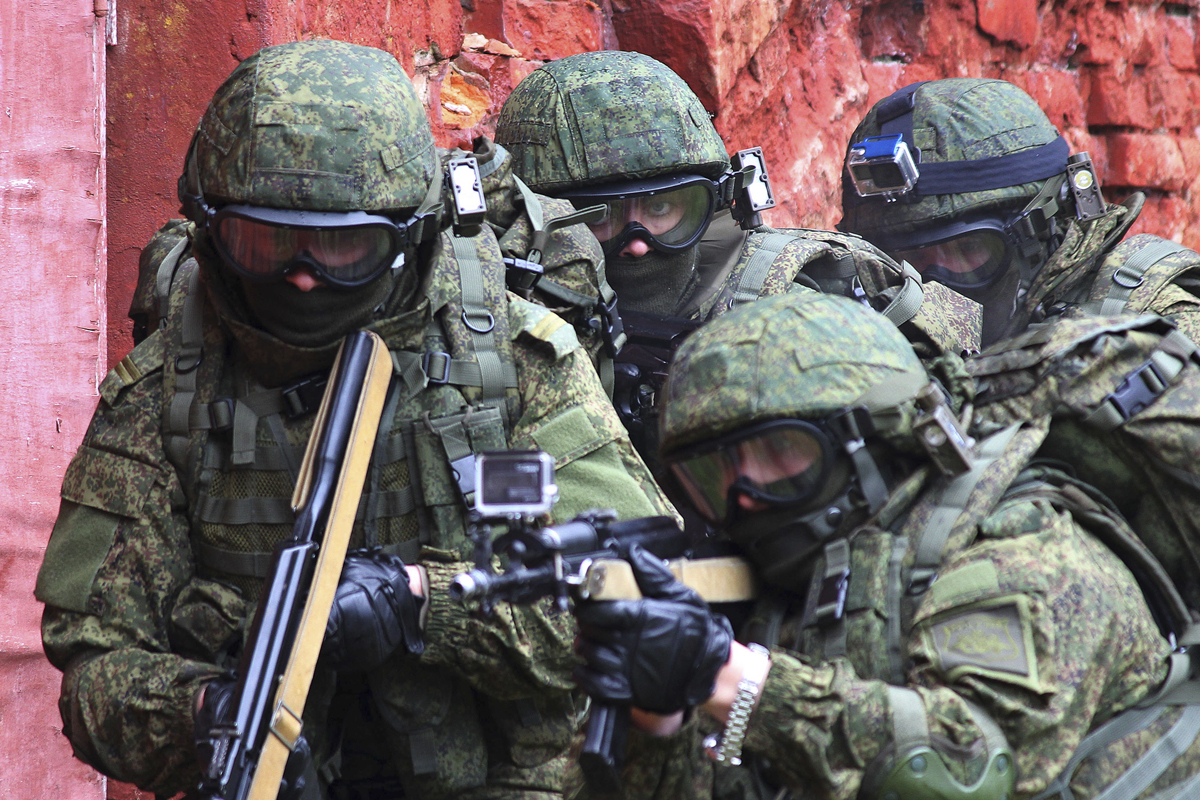
Training of the 313th Special Forces Detachment

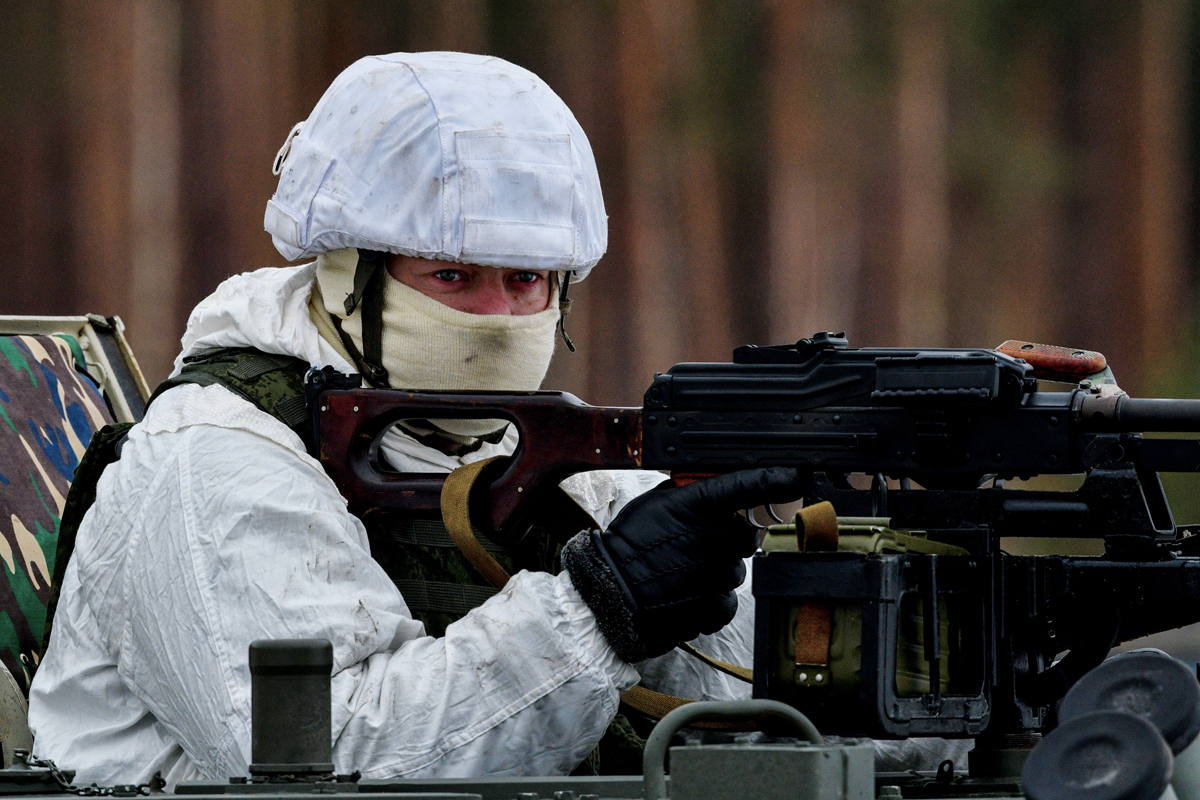
2nd Special Forces Brigade training

== See also ==
- Advanced Combat Helmet
- Enhanced Combat Helmet

== Bibliography ==
- Galeotti, Mark (2025). Putin's Mercenaries, 2013–24. Bloomsbury Publishing. ISBN 978-1472866264.
