= Arkady Brish =

Soviet physicist

- Арка́дий Ада́мович Бриш
- Born: Arkady Adamovich Brish; May 14, 1917; Minsk, Russian Empire
- Died: March 19, 2016 (aged 98); Moscow, Russia
- Education: Physics and Mathematics Faculty of the Belarusian State University
- Awards: Hero of Socialist Labour, Order "For Merit to the Fatherland", Order of Honour (Russia), Order of Lenin(4 times), Order of the October Revolution, Order of the Patriotic War, Order of the Red Banner of Labour(2 times), Order of the Red Star, Jubilee Medal "In Commemoration of the 100th Anniversary of the Birth of Vladimir Ilyich Lenin", Medal "To a Partisan of the Patriotic War", Medal "For the Victory over Germany in the Great Patriotic War 1941–1945", Jubilee Medal "Twenty Years of Victory in the Great Patriotic War 1941–1945", Jubilee Medal "Thirty Years of Victory in the Great Patriotic War 1941–1945", Jubilee Medal "Forty Years of Victory in the Great Patriotic War 1941–1945", Jubilee Medal "50 Years of Victory in the Great Patriotic War 1941–1945", Jubilee Medal "60 Years of Victory in the Great Patriotic War 1941–1945", Jubilee Medal "65 Years of Victory in the Great Patriotic War 1941–1945", Medal of Zhukov, Jubilee Medal "300 Years of the Russian Navy", Medal "In Commemoration of the 850th Anniversary of Moscow", Medal "Veteran of Labour", Jubilee Medal "50 Years of the Armed Forces of the USSR", Jubilee Medal "60 Years of the Armed Forces of the USSR", Jubilee Medal "70 Years of the Armed Forces of the USSR", Lenin Prize, USSR State Prize, Government awards of the Russian Federation

Arkady Adamovich Brish (May 14, 1917 – March 19, 2016) was a Soviet and Russian physicist, a designer of nuclear weapons, Doctor of Sciences, professor, Hero of Socialist Labour, Laureate of the Lenin Prize and the USSR State Prize.

== Biography ==
Brish was born on May 14, 1917, in Minsk to a teacher's family in Russian Empire (now Belarus). In 1931–1933 he was an apprentice electrician in the Belarusian office of the All-Union Electrotechnical Association in the city of Minsk. He began his labor activity in 1933 as an electrician in the evening school of the Western Railway in Minsk. In 1940 he graduated from the Faculty of Physics and Mathematics at Belarusian State University with a degree in Physics. Prior to the Great Patriotic War he worked at the Institute of Chemistry of the Academy of Sciences of the Byelorussian SSR. In 1937-1941 he was the executive secretary, and then the chairman of the Belarusian Council of the Voluntary Sports Society "Science."

After the invasion of Nazi troops in Minsk, he joined an underground group that resisted the invaders. After the fall of 1941 he was a scout of the headquarters of the partisan brigade of K. E. Voroshilov. After World War II, A. A. Brish moved to Moscow.

=== Timeline ===
- 1947 – 1955 - he worked at RFNC - VNIIEF.
- 1955 - he was at KB-25, now NL Dukhov All-Russian Research Institute of Automation (VNIIA).
- 1964 – 1997 - he was Chief Designer.
- 1997 – 2016 - he was an honorary scientific director at VNIIA and an honorary member of the Russian Academy of Rocket and Artillery Sciences.
- March 19, 2016 - he died in Moscow.
- March 23 - he was buried at the Federal Military Memorial Cemetery.

== Awards ==
- Hero of Socialist Labour - At the decree of the Presidium of the Supreme Soviet on May 6, 1983, an Order of Lenin and the «Hammer & Sickle» gold medal — for the creation of a nuclear weapon for the first strategic cruise missile.
- Order "For Merit to the Fatherland", 4th class (2008).
- Order of Honour (August 31, 1999) — for services to the state, great personal contribution to the formation, development of the nuclear industry and many years of conscientious work.
- Four Orders of Lenin (May 13, 1955; March 7, 1962; July 29, 1966; May 6, 1983).
- Order of the October Revolution (August 12, 1976).
- Order of the Patriotic War, 2nd class (March 11, 1985) — for the boldness, perseverance and courage shown in the struggle against the German fascist invaders, and in commemoration of the 40th anniversary of the victory of the Soviet people in the Great Patriotic War of 1941-1945
- Two Orders of the Red Banner of Labour (December 8, 1951; January 4, 1954).
- Order of the Red Star (December 30, 1948).
- Medal "To a Partisan of the Patriotic War" I class (March 21, 1945).
- Honored Worker of Science and Technology of the RSFSR (January 16, 1996) — for services to the state, great personal contribution to the development of the nuclear industry and many years of conscientious work.
- Lenin Prize (1960) — for the development of a new generation of a unified detonation and neutron initiation system for the R-7 intercontinental ballistic missile.
- USSR State Prize (1955) — for the creation of the first system for detonating nuclear charges with an external neutron source.
- Government awards of the Russian Federation (2000) — for research, analysis and synthesis of military-technical problems and developments of the second half of the 20th century, introduced into domestic weapons systems.
- Certificate of Honor of the Government of the Russian Federation (November 27, 2014) — for a great personal contribution to the development of the nuclear industry and many years of conscientious work.
- Gratitude from the Government of the Russian Federation (May 10, 2007) — for many years of fruitful scientific activity in the field of creation and improvement of nuclear weapons.

== Memorial ==
There is a memorial plaque for Arkady Brish by sculptor Aleksandr Nozdrin (2017) at the NL Dukhov All-Russian Research Institute of Automation.

== Literature ==
- Аркадий Адамович Бриш. Серия: Творцы ядерного века / Под общей ред. Ю. Н. Бармакова, Г. А. Смирнова — М.: ИздАт, 2007. — 472 с.
- Аркадий Адамович Бриш. Жизнь и судьба / Под общей ред. С. Ю. Лопарева, Ю. Н. Бармакова, Г. А. Смирнова. — М.: ИздАт, 2012. — 652 с.
- Атомное оружие России. Биографическая энциклопедия — М.: Издательский дом «Столичная энциклопедия», 2012. — 804 с.
- Это наша с тобой биография. — Калининград: Аксиос, 2014. — 304 с.
- Оборонно-промышленный комплекс России. Государственные деятели. Руководители предприятий. Ученые. Конструкторы. — М.: Издательский дом «Столичная энциклопедия», 2014. — 448 с.
- Богуненко Н. Н., Пелипенко А. Д., Соснин Г. А. (2005). "Бриш Аркадий Адамович". Герои атомного проекта. Саров: Росатом. pp. 75–76. ISBN 5-9515-0005-2.
