= Briche =

Briche may refer to

- André Briche (1772–1825), French general
- Roberto Briche, 16th century English sailor
- Souzy-la-Briche, a commune in the northern France

== See also ==
- Brish (disambiguation)
