= NL Dukhov All-Russian Research Institute of Automation =

Russian research institute

NL Dukhov All-Russian Scientific Research Institute of Automation (VNIIA)
- Type: Federal State Unitary Enterprise
- Predecessors: branch number 1 KB-11; KB-25; Research Institute of Aviation Automation; All-Union Research Institute of Automation
- Founded: 1954
- Headquarters: Moscow, Russia
- Key people: Sergey Yuryevich Loparev – director – Alexander Viktorovich Sidorov – chief designer Alexander Viktorovich Andriyash – scientific advisor
- Products: nuclear weapons, automated process control systems, vacuum devices, etc.
- Number of employees: more than 5000
- Parent: Rosatom
- Website: www.vniia.ru

Federal State Unitary Enterprise "NL Dukhov All-Russian Scientific Research Institute of Automation" (VNIIA) – is an enterprise of the State Atomic Energy Corporation Rosatom. Located in Moscow, the main sphere of activity is the development of nuclear weapons and their components.

== Types of activity at the Institute ==
The Institute deals with defense and industrial topics. Main directions of activity:

- nuclear weapons
- systems for detonating nuclear charges
- non-nuclear components and devices for automatics of nuclear weapons
- automatic test equipment
- improving the safety of nuclear weapons
- production of automated process control systems for nuclear power plants

== Controversies ==
In 2015, the institute demolished the apartment building N. F. Rzhevsky (which was one of its buildings) – a building built in 1902, located at Sushchevskaya street No. 16, p. 8 within the boundaries of cultural heritage protection zones. Moscow City Cultural Heritage Department considered the demolition "unauthorized". The Moscow government, which has no authority to stop demolition work in territory under the jurisdiction of the Ministry of Defense, condemned the actions of the NL Dukhov VNIIA, stressing that "there are moral principles that need to be observed... The actions of VNIIA are fundamentally wrong and require verification by the relevant state authorities."

== History ==
The institute was established in 1954 as branch No. 1 KB-11 of the Russian Federal Nuclear Center (VNIIEF), in Sarov, Russia (formerly named Arzamas-16). In 1956, the institute (VNIIA) was separated into an independent design bureau KB-25 of the Ministry of Medium Machine Building. Since then the company has changed the name repeatedly: since 1966 – the "Aviapribor" plant, since 1969 – the Research Institute of Aviation Automation, since 1986 – the All-Union Research Institute of Automation named after N.L.Dukhov, and from 1992 to the present – FSUE Dukhov Automatics Research Institute.

== Staff members ==
- 1954—1964: Lieutenant General of ITS N. L. Dukhov - Director and Chief Designer.
- 1964—1987: Lieutenant General N. I. Pavlov – Director.
- 1964—1997: A. A. Brish – Chief Designer.
- 1987—2008: Yu. N. Barmakov – Director, Lenin Prize Laureate and USSR State Prize Laureate.
- 1997—2015: G. A. Smirnov – Chief Designer, Russian Federation State Prize Laureate and Russian Federation Prize of the Government.
- 2008: S. Yu. Loparev – Director, Russian Federation State Prize Laureate.
- 2015: A. V. Sidorov – Chief Designer.

== See also ==
- Soviet atomic bomb project
- Timeline of nuclear weapons development
- All-Russian Scientific Research Institute of Experimental Physics
- All-Russian Scientific Research Institute Of Technical Physics
- Lawrence Livermore National Laboratory
- Los Alamos National Laboratory
- Sandia National Laboratories
