= Ratnik (program) =

Russian military equipment system

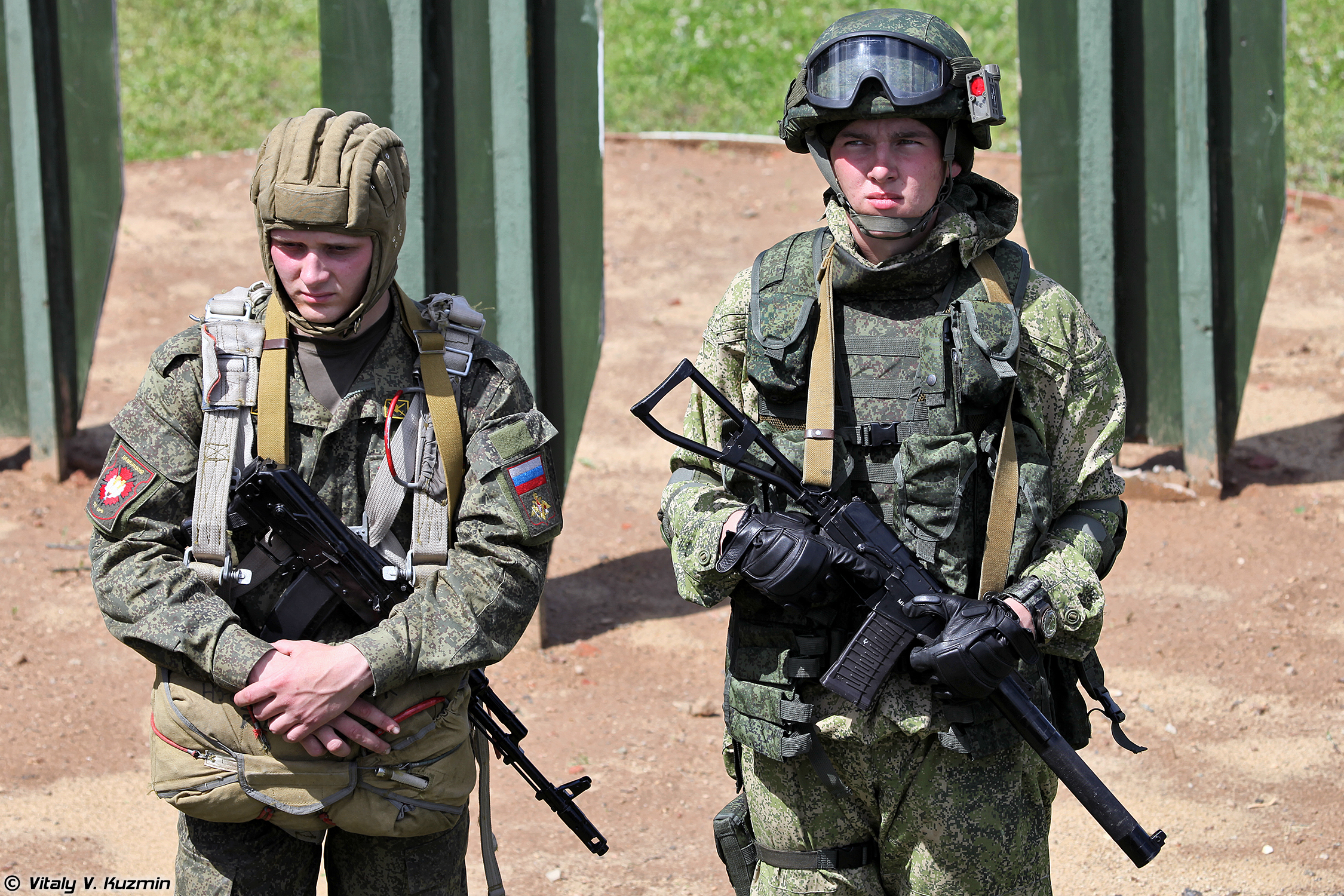
- Ratnik equipment shown in Open Day 2017 with the 4th Guards Tank Division with a paratrooper (left) and recon (right) variants.
- Type: Future soldier program
- Place of origin: Russia

Service history
- In service: 2015–present
- Used by: See Users
- Wars: Annexation of Crimea by the Russian Federation; Syrian civil war Russo-Ukraine War

Production history
- Designer: TsNIITochMash
- Designed: 2013-present
- Manufacturer: TsNIITochMash
- Produced: 2013-Present

Ratnik (Russian: Ратник, lit. 'warrior') is a Russian future infantry combat system. Some components, including the communication systems and night vision technologies, have extremely limited military distribution. It is designed to improve the connectivity and combat effectiveness of combat personnel in the Russian Armed Forces. Improvements include modernised body armour, a helmet with a special eye monitor (thermal, night vision monocular, flashlight), communication systems, and special headphones. It includes 10 subsystems and 59 individual items.

An improved "Sotnik" system was expected in 2025.

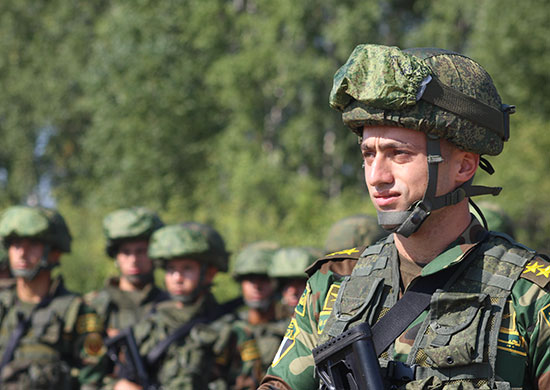
Egyptian paratroopers wearing Ratnik

== History ==
The Ratnik was first reported used during the annexation of Crimea by the Russian Federation in 2014. There were also reports that Russian troops have tested Ratnik components in combat operations.

In August 2019, it was reported that Ratnik has been tested by soldiers from Belarus, Vietnam, Kyrgyzstan, China, Laos, Mongolia, Pakistan and Uzbekistan.

In July 2021, Russian troops deployed to Tajikistan to work alongside Tajik forces are equipped with at least 200 sets of Ratnik.

== Components ==
The Ratnik gear is a system of modern protective and communication devices, weapons and ammunition. It consists of a helmet, body armour; a one-piece coverall; hearing protection; protective glasses; a protective set for knees and elbows; a grenade launcher, submachine gun or assault rifle; sniper rifle, ammunition; a combat knife, as well as 24/7 reconnaissance means; a day and night sighting system; a small-size binocular; optical and thermal weapon sights, etc. Ratnik gear is paired up with EMR camouflage.

As well as these, the system comprises a universal shelter, a multifunctional knife, a signal lamp, a watch, winter and summer two-side camouflage sets; an autonomous heat source; a backpack, an individual water filter; a small entrenching tool, breath protection devices; means of radiological and chemical control; a medical kit, and filtering clothes.

The "Strelets" ("Musketeer"/ Стрельцы) system provides voice and video communication. The system includes a GLONASS navigation module so that a squad leader can see the location of each soldier on his small, book-sized, computer. With this computer, he also can give orders to his squad, and send videos and photos to headquarters. As well as this, each soldier has their own smaller telephone-sized tactical computer. The Strelets command, control, and intelligence (C2I) system was operated in the Syrian conflict to send target data to strike aircraft. The use of the Strelets in conjunction with the Su-24M frontline bomber provides almost 100% accuracy.

Ratnik protects almost 90% of a soldier's body. The main body armor with plates, designated 6B45 '6Б45', is rated at protection class 6, according to GOST R 50744-95, and weighs 7.5 kg (with the Assault variant weighing up to 15 kg). The main body armor fully protects from 7.62×39mm rounds from assault rifles, and 7.62×54mmR from sniper rifles, including the increased penetration of hardened rounds, and can survive hits from repeated shots in these calibers conducted at close range. It is claimed that the 6B47 helmet protects a soldier's head 40 percent more than NATO analogs.

The plates inside the vest, designated Granit ('гранит'), are removable from the 6B45 (6Б45), with the inside of the vest being lined with Kevlar for additional protection. These plates are shaped similarly to the "Shooter" variant of the United States Armed Forces Small Arms Protective Insert. The 6B43 was an early iteration of the 6B45 that was initially produced as part of the Ratnik program which had removable Kevlar inserts.

Variants of the Ratnik Program body armor were designed for different purposes including the 6B46 (6Б46) - a lighter-weight, para-droppable design aimed at replicating the popular small form factors and utility of the 6B48 (6Б48) - created for tank crews and issued in 2016. Although the 6B46 (6Б46) was issued as part of the initial Ratnik program, there is not much evidence of them being used by units in the field, with the first mass use seen in public occurring during the Slavic Brotherhood 2019 joint international exercise in Serbia. Recently however, it has been spotted in the current Russo-Ukraine war, being used by paratroopers of the 31st Guards Air Assault Brigade during the Battle of Antonov Airport in 2022.

The weight of the full Ratnik infantry system with the special thigh and shoulder bulletproof shields is 19–20 kg. Basic Ratnik gear (for engineers and medics) weighs 15 kg (without thigh and shoulder guards). Ratnik gear is made of a special fabric that prevents troops from being detected by infrared devices.

Russia’s TsNIITochMash (part of the Rostec defence conglomerate) has developed more powerful 7N39 ‘Igolnik’ 5.45×39mm cartridge and its 7N40 variant, with an increased density of fire and bullet penetration during its work on the Ratnik soldier gear. Russia’s holding company Shvabe has developed a new, lighter version of the thermal night vision weapon sight, which is to complement the soldier’s field combat gear Ratnik. Russia’s holding company Shvabe also created the technology increasing aiming distance.

== Production history ==
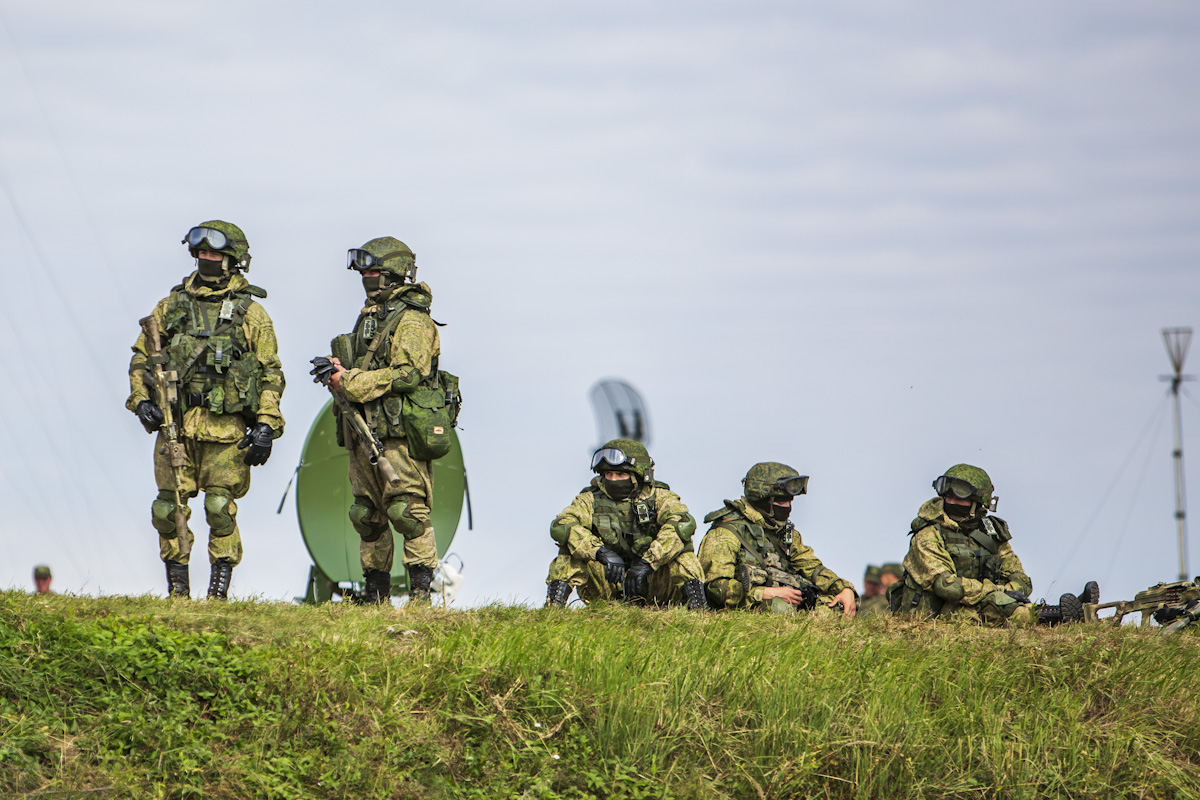
Russian soldiers wearing 6Sh122 during the Joint anti-terrorism exercise of the countries of the Shanghai Cooperation Organization “Peace Mission 2018”

Prototype Ratnik kits were initially distributed to selected units in the Ground Forces in 2013 according to Oleg Martyanov, a member of Russia's Military-Industrial Commission, which acts as the government's liaison with the defense industry. Initially only elite troops will receive the AK-12 as part of the Ratnik system, while the rest of the Ground Forces will continue using the AK-74M into the 2020s.

For the Russian Navy and Engineer Troops, the bulletproof vest is combined with a life vest, so that soldiers and sailors who are thrown into the water won't drown. All Naval Infantry units were equipped with Ratnik gear as of November 2016.

Serial deliveries and batch production of Ratnik began in the first half of 2015. About 300,000 Ratnik sets have been delivered as of December 2020. Russia’s Ground Forces and the Navy’s coastal brigades are practically fully equipped with the Ratnik combat gear in March 2019. 18,000 sets delivered in 2019 in basic, commander, sniper, machine-gunner, gunner and tank man versions and 18,000 more in 2020. A new version for mountainous-desert terrain begun to be delivered in July 2021. Work was carried out in 2021 to include mini-and micro-UAVs, wearable robotic complexes, as well as exoskeletons. The Novosibirsk Instrument Making Plant has developed augmented reality glasses that are integrated into the Ratnik. The estimated cost of one set of glasses is over 500 thousand rubles, or $6,000 USD, $2,000 more than a second generation Microsoft Hololens. 2022 Ratnik deliveries were reportedly completed ahead of time.

== List of individual components ==
=== Clothing Layer ===
Best overview of the Ratnik clothing system. All layers shown in the diagram correspond with those on the chart. Underwear layer consists of a wicking layer (1) and a fleece layer (2). The main EMR Uniform Layer consists of (along with associated pants), a fleece jacket(3), a windbreaker (4), a demi-season suit (5), a water- and wind-proof suit (6), an insulated vest (7), and a winter suit (8).

Underwear Layer
Title Description	Layer #	Description
Polyester briefs layer	First Layer	Wicking layer consisting of a pair of boxer briefs and a t-shirt
Polyester underwear layer	First Layer	Second wicking layer consisting of a polyester long sleeve undershirt and full length polyester underpants.
Fleece underwear layer	Second Layer	Third layer consisting of a fleece long sleeve undershirt and full length fleece underpants.

EMR Uniform Layer
Title Description		Description
Fleece Jacket	Third Layer	Fleece Jacket that is supposed to be versatile enough to see use in the summer time. Uses the fifth layer's pants.
Wind Breaker Jacket	Fourth Layer	A rip-stock wind breaker layer that is designed to repel rain, dirt, and snow. The demiseason pants practically belong with the windbreaker as the pants can be used by either the fourth or fifth layer, but its hard to wright out a shared pair of pants.
VKBO Demi-Season Suit	Fifth Layer	Main field kit for lower temperatures. Insulating rip-stop material with good breathability. Main difference from the wind breaker is a hood, allowing the wearer to properly use a gas mask and also have a hood.
VKBO Water-Proof & Wind-Proof Suit	Sixth Layer	The water-proof and wind-proof outer shell of the VKPO clothing system designed to protect against rain, wet snow, and strong wind.
Cold Vest	Seventh Layer	A sleeveless vest that provides additional thermal insulation to the torso in cold conditions, typically worn over the 5th and 6th layer.
VKBO Winter Suit	Eighth Layer	Main field kit for the coldest conditions, designed as the outer insulating layer for extremely cold weather for temperatures of -40°C if layered with the appropriate VKPO underlayers. Consists of a trouser and jacket.

General Equipment
Title Description	Type	Image	Description
6B47 (6Б47)	Ballistic Helmet		Aramid fibre helmet system rated for small arms fire. Includes two covers that allow the helmet to be jumpable, one white and one in the standard EMR (Digital Flora) pattern.
6B45/6B43	Body Armour		Primary body armour system for infantry units. MOLLE webbing on the front allows for the addition of pouches (as on the 6B46).
6B46 (6Б46)	Body Armour		Plate carrier style armour system for light-weight units
6B48 (6Б48) Ratnik-ZK	Body Armour		Primary body armour system for tank and AFV crews
6Sh116/6Sh117 (6ш116/6ш117)	Load Bearing Equipment		Load bearing equipment with a variety of utility and magazine pouches to suit the various weapons of the Russian Military, includes a 7-litre 'butt pack' and 25-litre patrol backpack. (Similar to US Military's MOLLE load bearing vest)
6B49 (6Б49) Ratnik-BZK	Body Armour		Anti-fragmentation suit in standard EMR (Digital Flora) pattern.
6Sh122 Masking Suit	Masking Suit		A reversible combat oversuit designed for concealment (This is mainly used as recon) in a variety of environments, it comes in 2 variants, light green and brown.
6Sh118 RAID Pack (6ш118)	Backpack		60-litre backpack designed for carrying large equipment and for long deployments.
GSSh-01 (6m2)	Hearing Protection		Active hearing protection with radio cable.

=== Accessories ===
- 6B50 (6Б50) - Dust and impact goggles
- 6B51 (6Б51) - Knee and elbow protection based on an improved version of the Russian-made Splav 'X Pads'
- 6Sh122 Gloves (6ш122)
- VKBO Summer boots
- Faradei Winterised boots
- 6E5 Light Shovel
- 6E6 Multitool
- 6Sh120 Shelter system
- 6E4-1 Watch
- FSS-014 Light - light system that can be mounted to 6B47 (6Б47) helmet
- NF-10 Individual water system
- 1PN140 and 1PN141 night and thermal vision sights

== Users ==
- Egypt
- Fiji
- Russia

== Gallery ==
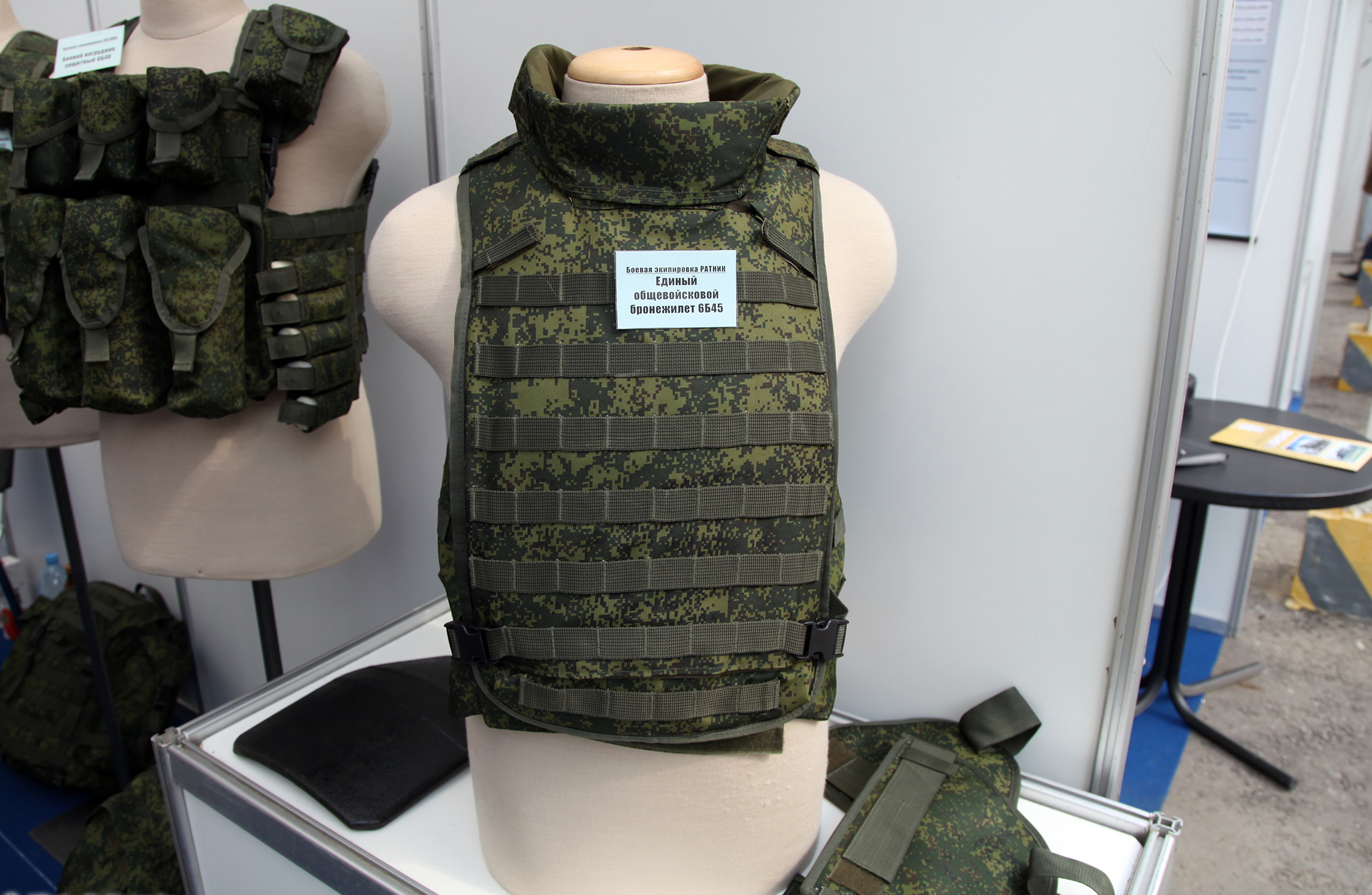
6B45 ballistic vest.

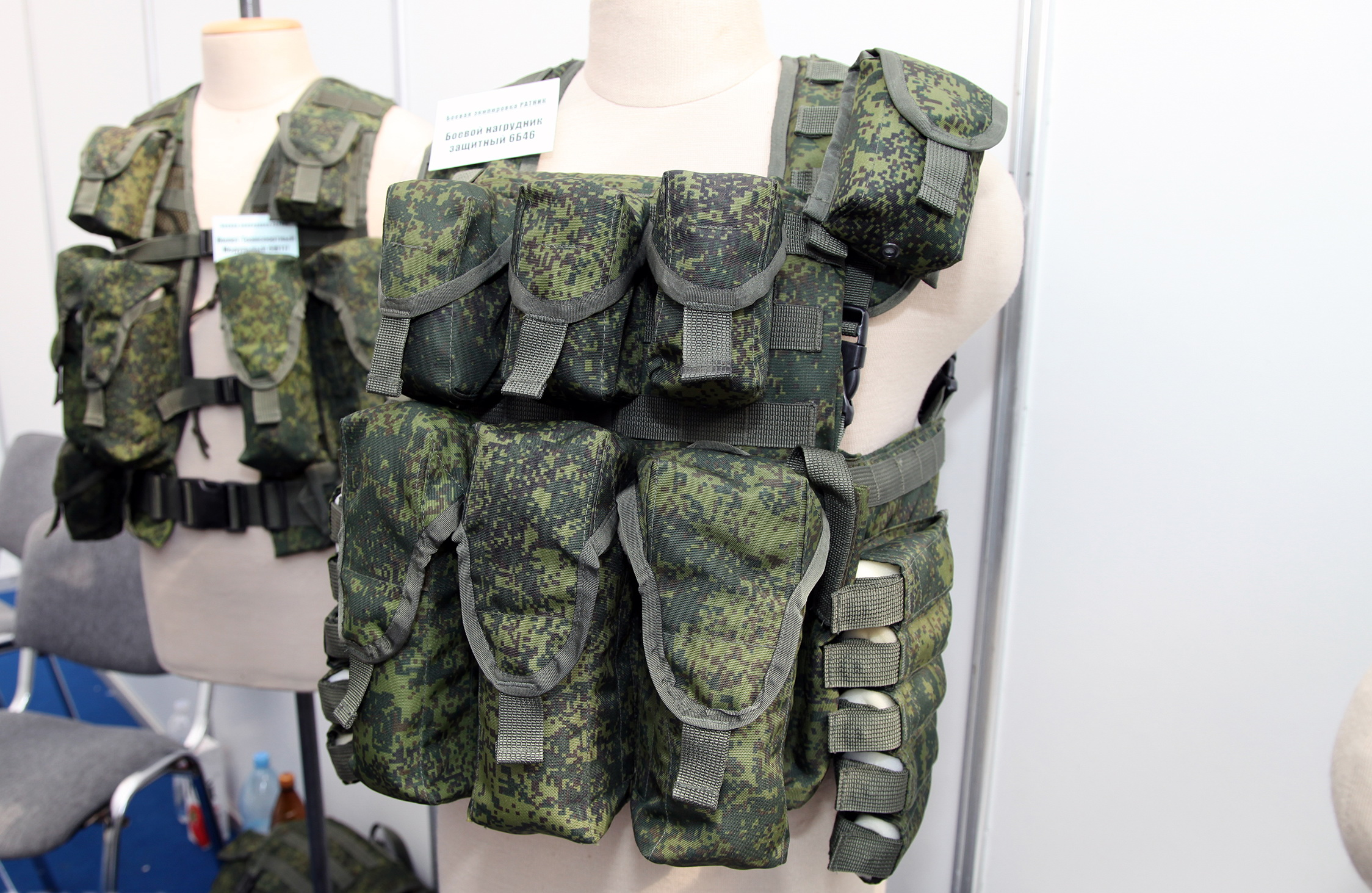
6B46 tactical vest / plate carrier.

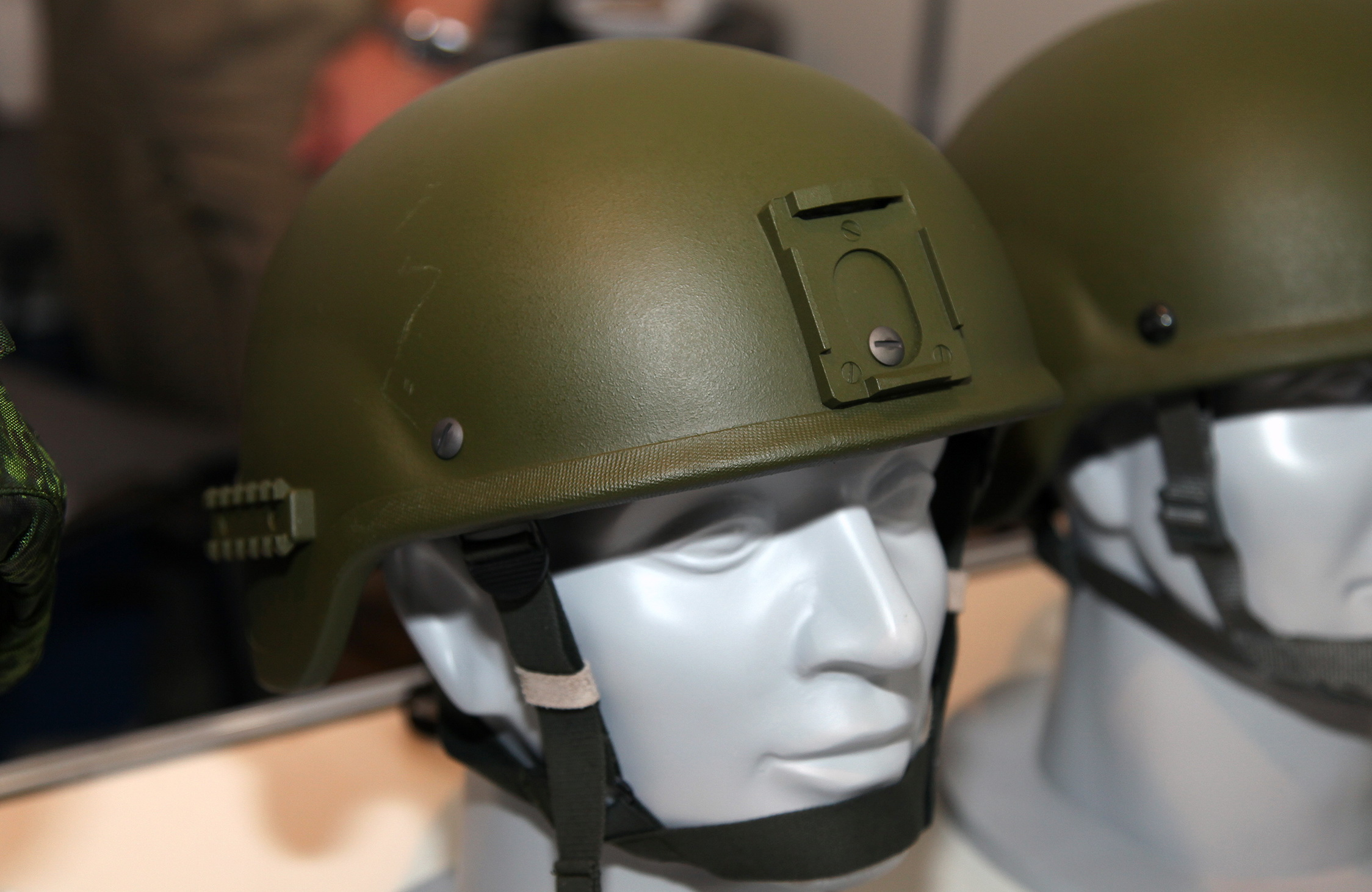
6B47 military helmet.

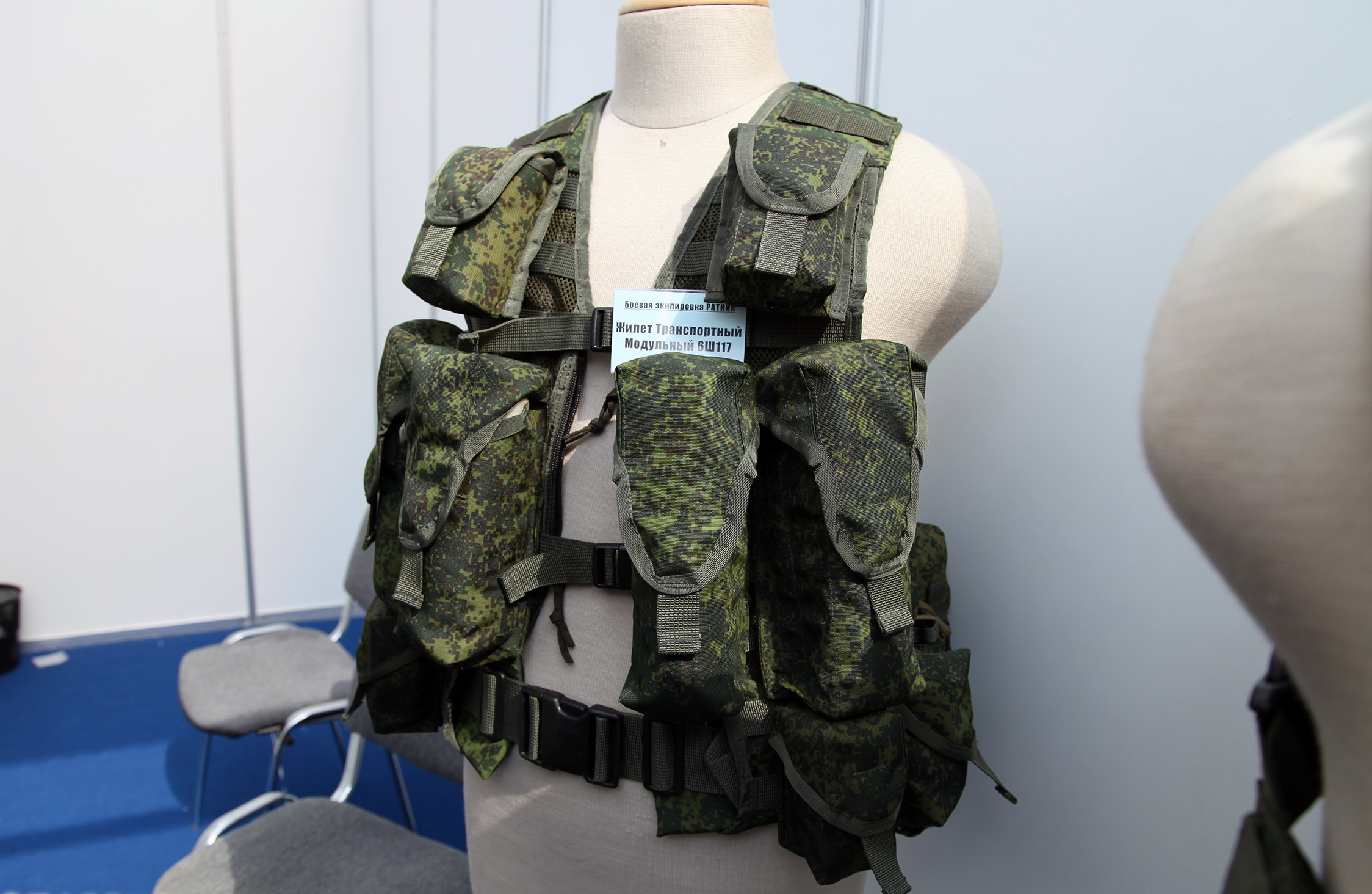
6Sh117 all-purpose lightweight individual carrying equipment.

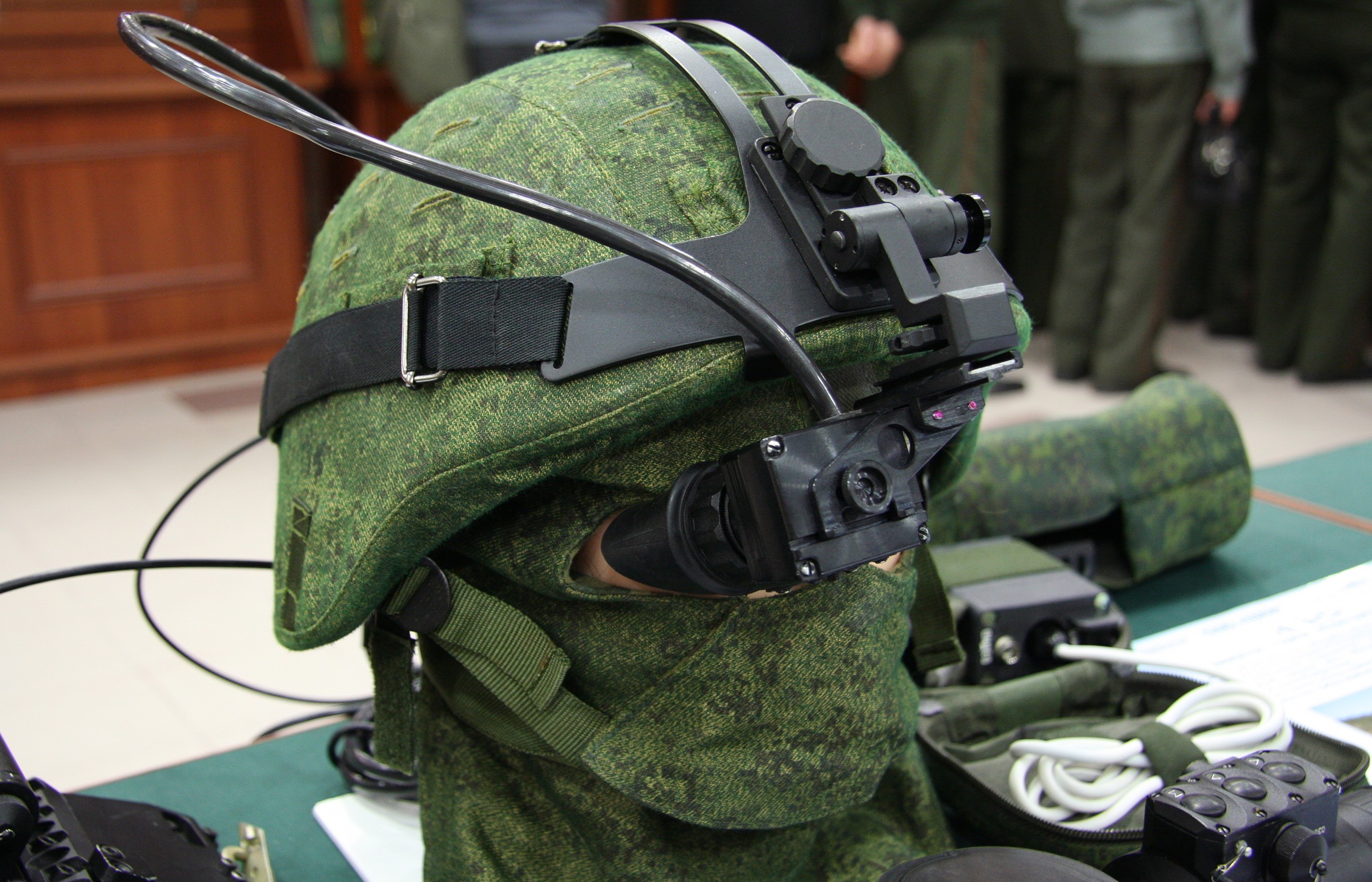
1PN139 thermographic monitor, and protective headgear from the 6B49 suit.

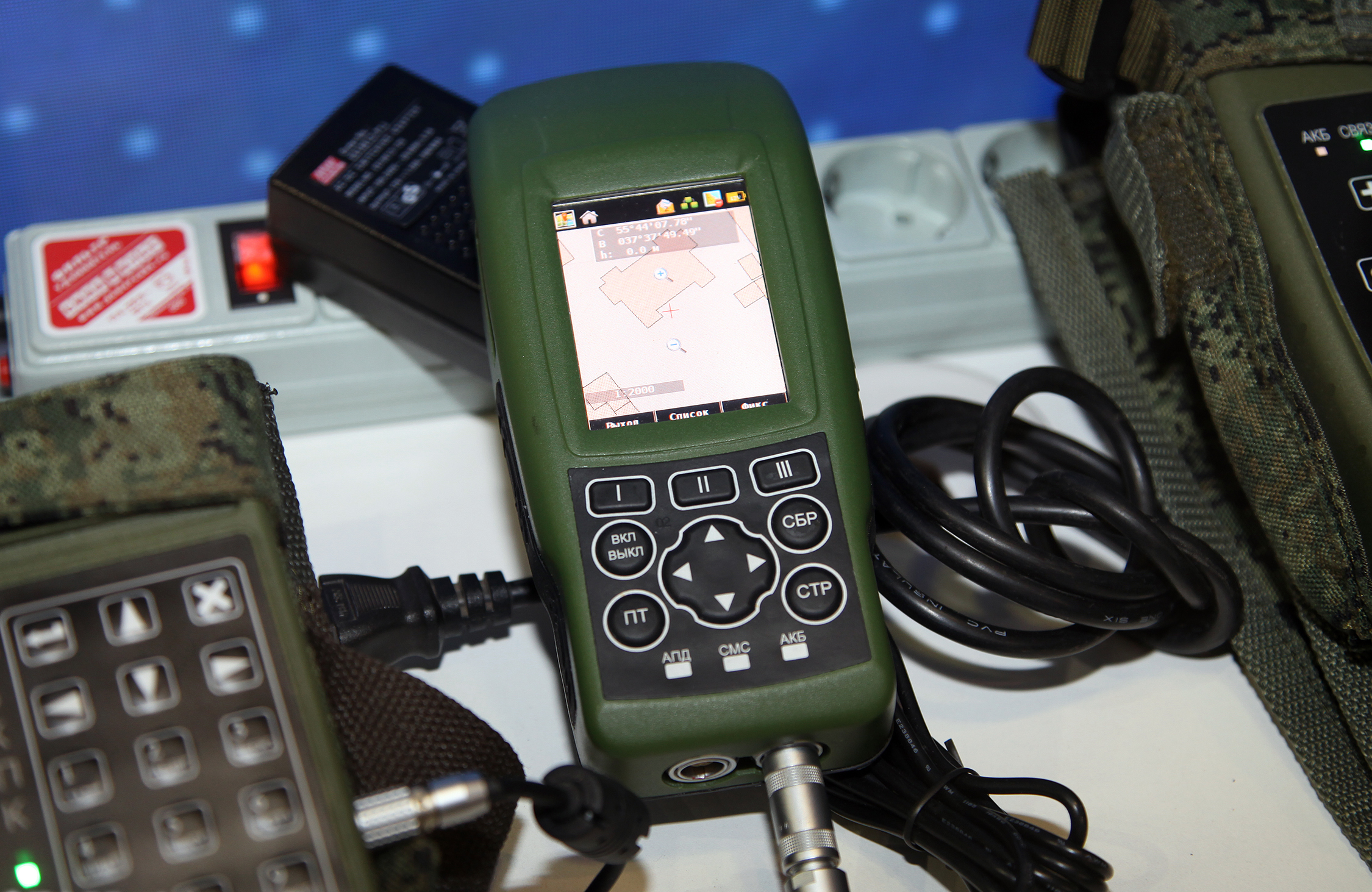
NPI-2 wearable GLONASS receiver for the soldier.

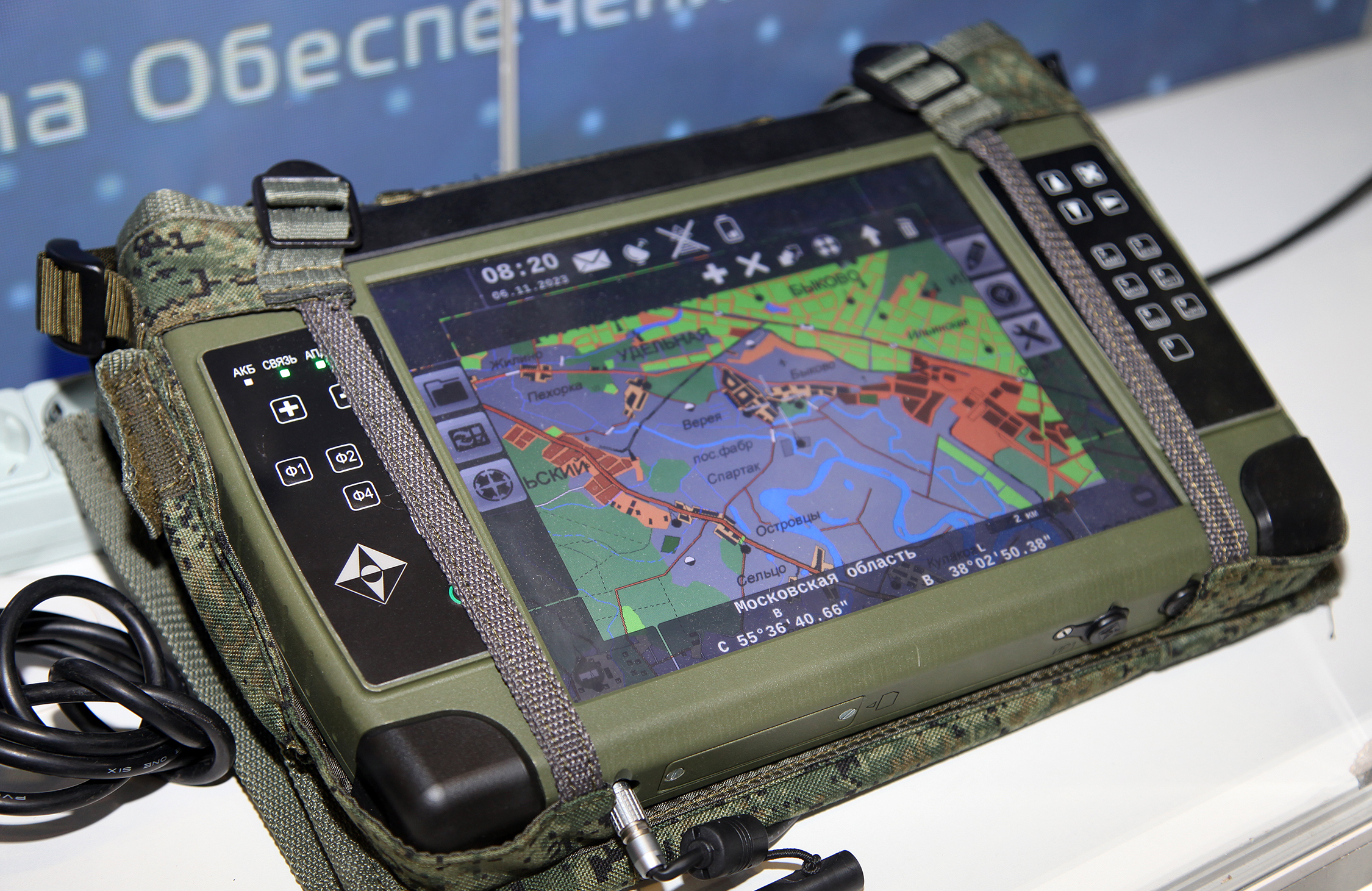
'Sagittarius' commanding officer tablet computer.

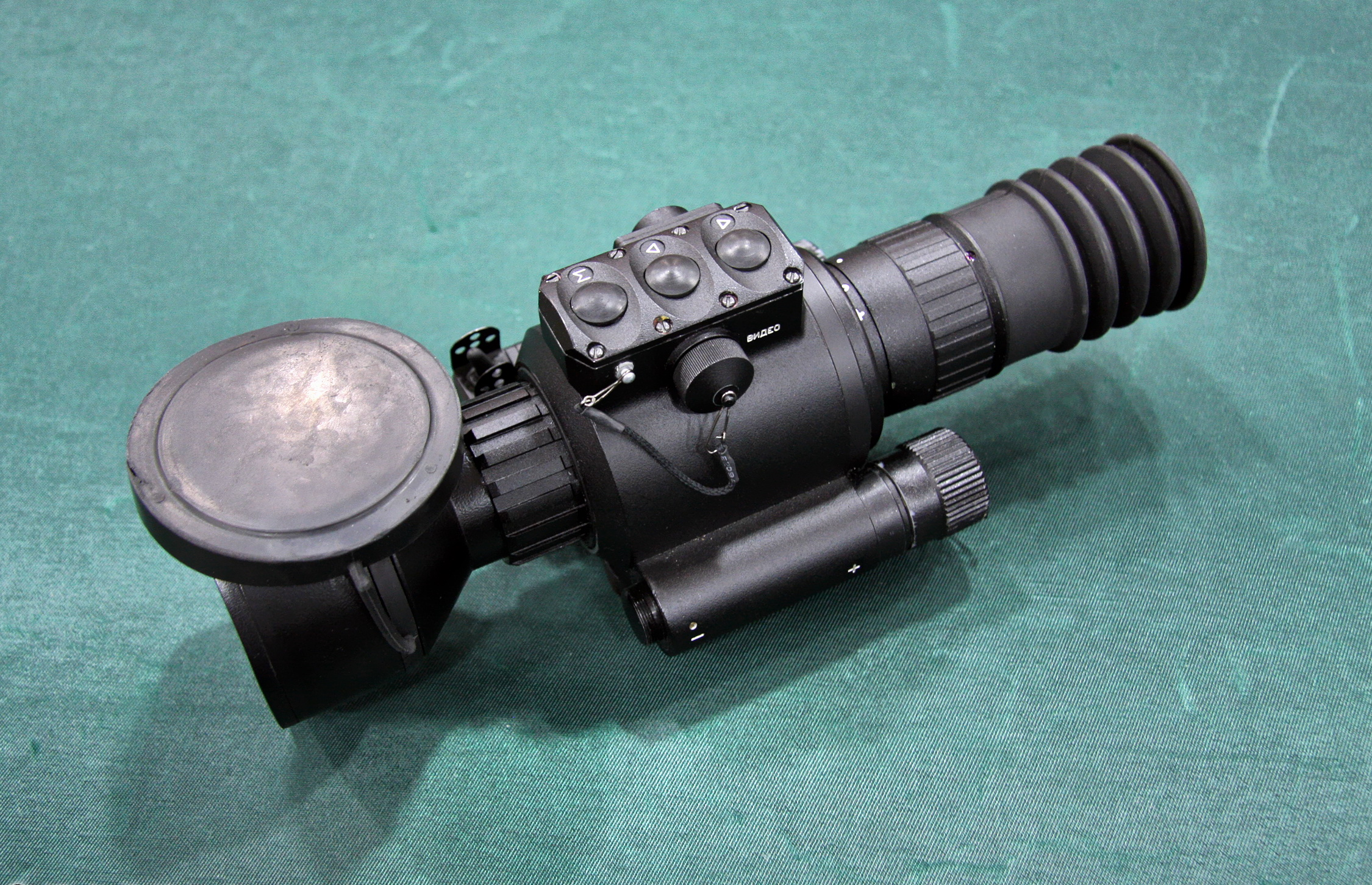
1PN140 'Shakhin' or 'Shahin' (Шахин) thermal optic for rifle mount

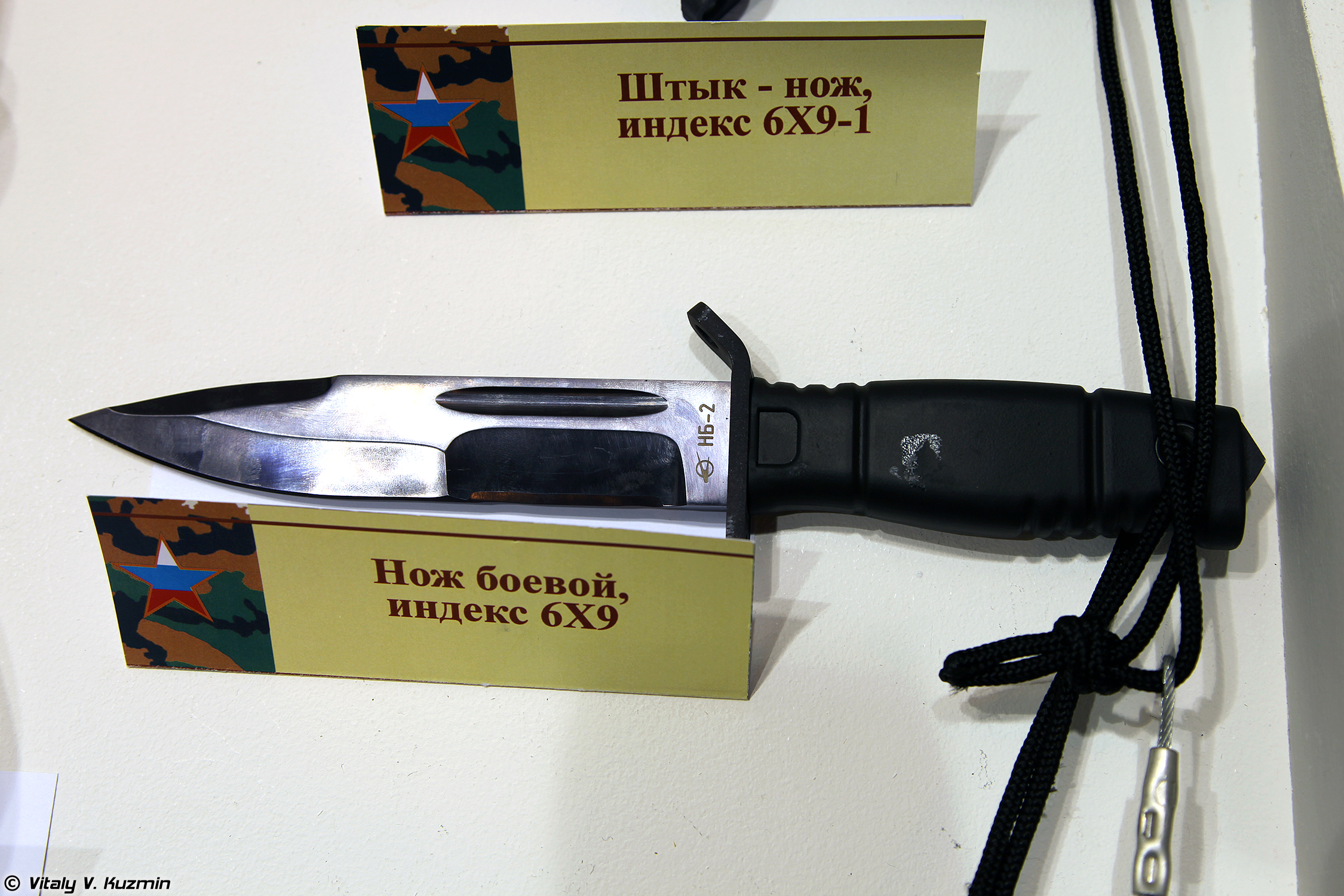
6KH9 bayonet
