= Russian Academy of Rocket and Artillery Sciences =

Russian Academy of Rocket and Artillery Sciences (RARAN)

Agency overview
- Formed: April 5, 1994
- Preceding agency: Academy of Artillery Sciences
- Headquarters: Russia; 107564, Moscow, First Myasnikovskaya Street, 3 bldg. 3
- Employees: Academics - 100; Corresponding members - 200.
- Agency executive: Vasily Mikhailovich Burenok, President
- Website: www.guraran.ru

The Russian Academy of Rocket and Artillery Sciences (RARAN) is a non-profit scientific organization of the Russian Federation. RARAN coordinates the activities of scientists who carry out complex research and development (R & D) on the creation, operation and use of modern weapons, military technology and special equipment. The Academy was established on April 5, 1994 by a decree of the RF President "in order to revive the traditions of Russian military science, and to develop scientific research in the country's defense complex". RARAN is the only scientific and expert organization in the power structures that has state status. It unites leading scientists and specialists from organizations of the Russian Ministry of Defense, other federal executive authorities and the defense industry. This union enables the solutions of problematic issues such as the systemic development of weapons and special military technology (VVST). According to its legal form, RARAN is a federal state budgetary institution. By the Decree of the RF Government on July 17, 1995 No. 715, RARAN was equated with branch academies. The principles of activity and its numbers were determined: 100 full members and 200 corresponding members. In addition, the charter provides for the possibility of electing honorary and foreign members. Since 2016, according to the decision of the board of the RF Military-Industrial Commission, RARAN was designated the head scientific organization for the Council of Chief Designers of the weapons systems of the Army. The President of the Academy was also appointed the head of this council.

== Official objectives ==
- to conduct scientific research in the areas of precision rockets, artillery and anti-aircraft weapons, electronic equipment and systems for the control of arms and troops.
- to develop theory and technology for the creation of missile and artillery systems, including those used for peaceful purposes.
- to participate in the formation and development of programs in fundamental scientific research for the creation of advanced systems and weapons complexes.
- to train qualified specialists for the Russian Armed Forces and defense industry.

== Russo-Ukrainian war ==
In May 2026, during the Russo-Ukrainian war, the commander of Ukraine's Unmanned Systems Forces, Robert Brovdi, said that a facility in the Russian-occupied town Snizhne linked with the Russian Academy of Rocket and Artillery Sciences had been struck with drones. Reportedly, the facility was being used to train drone operators and produce war related material, and the attack killed 65 Russian cadets and the head of the facility, along with destroying equipment.

== Academy Structure ==
=== Office of the Presidium ===
- Secretariat of the Presidium
- Administrative management
- Financial and economic services
- Legal services
- Secretariat of the Council of Chief Designers

=== Scientific Departments of the Academy ===
1. Military-technical policy and military economy.
2. Weapons systems for land missions.
3. Weapons systems for combat in airspace.
4. Weapons systems for dealing with space warfare.
5. Weapons systems for ocean and naval theater control.
6. Inter-specific intelligence systems.
7. Advanced technological warfare based on new physical principles.
8. Substances and materials for advanced weapons of warfare.
9. Technical and technological development in the defense industry.
10. Problems of military security.
11. Material, technical and financial support of the Armed Forces of the Russian Federation.

=== Regional Scientific Centers ===
- North-West Regional Scientific Center RARAN - St. Petersburg
- Volga Regional Scientific Center RARAN - Sarov
- Tula Regional Scientific Center RARAN - Tula
- Ural-Siberian Regional Scientific Center RARAN - Nizhny Tagil

=== Associate Members ===
- Scientific Center "Aviation Technology and Armament"
- Preobrazhensky Scientific Center
- Petrovsky Scientific Center
- Scientific Center of Rocket and Space Systems
- Scientific Center for Interspecific Research in Advanced Weapons, Military and Special Technology
- Saint Petersburg Scientific Center
- Scientific Center "Levsha"
- Scientific Center "Innovation in Troops Logistics"
- Scientific Center of Advanced Technologies for Military Equipment

== Publications ==
- "RARAN News"
- "Protection and Security"
- "Armament and Economics"
- "Weapons and Military Technology Research and Development Reference Library" : (10 volumes) 2004 - 2012
- "Scientific Library" (issued since 2014 in order to preserve the scientific heritage of Russian military science)

== Scientific Conferences and Symposia ==
- "Modern methods of designing and testing missile and artillery weapons" (conducted since 1998)
- "Actual problems of design, manufacturing and testing of body armor"
- "Design of weapons systems and measuring complexes"
