= List of equipment of the Russian Ground Forces =

Estimated list of the equipment of the Russian Ground Forces in service as of 2025. Due to ongoing Russian invasion of Ukraine, quantities of operational equipment are highly uncertain and details of reactivated equipment and observed losses included in the Details. Also note that this list does not include information on Ukrainian equipment captured by Russian forces during the invasion. Equipment used by the First Donetsk Army Corps and Second Guards Lugansk-Severodonetsk Army Corps are listed separately.

== Small arms ==
Model	Image	Caliber	Origin	Type	Notes
Pistols
Makarov PM		9×18mm Makarov	Soviet Union	Semi-automatic pistol	Still used in substantial numbers by the Russian Armed Forces.
PB		9×18mm Makarov	Soviet Union	Suppressed semi-automatic pistol	Used by special forces.
Stechkin APS		9×18mm Makarov	Soviet Union	Machine pistol	Issued to vehicle crews and pilots in Chechnya.
PSS silent pistol		7.62×42mm	Soviet Union	Semi-automatic pistol	Used by special forces.
Makarov PMM		9×18mm Makarov	Russia	Semi-automatic pistol	12 round magazine. Issued in limited numbers.
MP-443 Grach		9x19 Parabellum	Russia	Semi-automatic pistol	Service pistol adopted in 2003 to replace the aging Makarov PM for frontline units.
GSh-18		9x19 Parabellum	Russia	Semi-automatic pistol	Service pistol adopted to replace the aging Makarov PM.
SR-1 Vektor		9×21mm Gyurza	Russia	Semi-automatic pistol	Used by Spetsnaz units.
SR-2 Udav		9×21mm Gyurza	Russia	Semi-automatic pistol	Possible replacement to the aging Makarov PM.
Submachine Guns
PP-19 Vityaz		9×19mm Parabellum	Russia	Submachine gun	Used by Spetsnaz units.
PP-2000		9×19mm Parabellum	Russia	Submachine gun	Delivered in November 2023.
Shotguns
KS-23		23×75mmR	Soviet Union	Pump-action combat shotgun	Used by Spetsnaz units.
Saiga-12		12-gauge	Russia	Semi-automatic combat shotgun	Used by Spetsnaz units.
Bolt action rifles
Mosin–Nagant M1891/30		7.62×54mmR	Russian Empire; Soviet Union	Bolt-action rifle	Seen in use by conscripts during the 2022 invasion of Ukraine.
Carbines
AKS-74U		5.45×39mm	Soviet Union	Carbine	A shortened variant of the AK-74.
SR-3 Vikhr		9×39mm	Russia	Carbine	Used by special forces.
Assault rifles
AEK-971		5.45×39mm	Soviet Union	Assault rifle	Limited use, KORD variant is adopted as part of the Ratnik program.
AK-74		5.45×39mm	Soviet Union	Assault rifle	Limited use.
AKS-74		5.45×39mm	Soviet Union	Assault rifle	Limited use.
AN-94	AN-94 assault rifle at Engineering Technologies 2012	5.45×39mm	Russia	Assault rifle	Limited used by Spetsnaz units.
AKM		7.62×39mm	Soviet Union	Assault rifle	Limited use with Russian naval infantry, armoured, and special forces.
AKMS	AKMS - 7,62x39mm - Armémuseum	7.62×39mm	Soviet Union	Assault rifle	Limited use with Russian naval infantry, armoured, and special forces. Seen in use with PBS-1 suppressors.
AS Val		9×39mm	Soviet Union	Suppressed assault rifle	Limited use by special forces.
AK-74M		5.45×39mm	Russia	Assault rifle	Standard issue rifle.
AK-74M UUK	AK-74M UUK	5.45×39mm	Russia	Assault rifle	Upgrade kit for the AK-74M, consisting of a new safety, dust cover and furniture featuring improved ergonomics and rails.
AK-12		5.45×39mm	Russia	Assault rifle	Used by elite forces under the Ratnik program.
AK-103		7.62×39mm	Russia	Assault rifle	
AK-15		7.62×39mm	Russia	Assault rifle	Developed under the Ratnik program, it's expected to replace the AK-103.
Machine guns
RPK-74M		5.45×39mm	Russia	Light machine gun	Standard issue light machine gun.
RPL-20		5.45×39mm	Russia	Light machine gun	Squad automatic weapon
PKM		7.62×54mmR	Soviet Union	General-purpose machine gun	Standard issue GPMG. To be replaced with the PKP Pecheneg.
PKP Pecheneg	PKP Pecheneg machine gun - RaceofHeroes-part2-19	7.62×54mmR	Russia	General-purpose machine gun	Replacing the PKM. It supplements the PKMs in service during the Russo-Ukrainian War.
DShK		12.7×108mm	Soviet Union	Heavy machine gun	Still used in the 2022 invasion of Ukraine.
NSV		12.7×108mm	Soviet Union	Heavy machine gun	Standard service heavy machine gun. Being replaced by the Kord.
Kord		12.7×108mm	Russia	Heavy machine gun	Entered service in 1998, it currently supplements the NSVs in service.
Sniper rifles and designated marksman rifles
VSS Vintorez		9×39mm	Soviet Union	Semi-automatic suppressed designated marksman rifle	Used by special forces. Selected as part of the Ratnik infantry combat system.
Dragunov SVD		7.62×54mmR	Soviet Union; Russia	Semi-automatic designated marksman rifle	Main service designated marksman rifle. The modernized SVDM is also used.
SV-98		7.62×54mmR	Russia	Bolt-action sniper rifle	
Orsis T-5000		.338 Lapua Magnum	Russia	Bolt-action sniper rifle	Replacing the Dragunov SVD in the sniping role.
BeSpokeGun Raptor Tactical .338 LM		.338 Lapua Magnum	Russia	Sniper rifle	Custom-made in small batches.
Lobaev Sniper Rifle		.338 Lapua Magnum	Russia	Bolt-action sniper rifle	The new batches of DXL-5, manufactured for the Russian army, are made under the Russian cartridge 12.7×108mm.
ASVK	ASVK at Celebration of 70th anniversary of the Victory in the Battle of Stalingrad in TSNIITOCHMASH 01	12.7×108mm	Russia	Anti-materiel rifle	Used by special forces. The modernized ASVK-M Kord-M is being adopted by the Russian army.
OSV-96		12.7×108mm	Russia	Anti-materiel rifle	Used by Spetsnaz units.
Recoilless rifles
SPG-9		73 mm	Soviet Union	Recoilless rifle	
Grenade launchers
GP-25/30/34		40mm VOG-25	Soviet Union	Underslug grenade launcher	Can be fitted to AKM, AK-74, AN-94, and AK-100 series rifles.
GM-94		43×30mm	Russia	Multi-shot grenade launcher	Used by special forces.
RG-6/6G30		40mm VOG-25	Russia	Multi-shot grenade launcher	
AGS-17		30×29mm	Soviet Union	Automatic grenade launcher	
AGS-30		30×29mm	Russia	Automatic grenade launcher	
AGS-40 Balkan		40mm	Russia	Automatic grenade launcher	Recommended to enter service in 2021, after the completion of operational tests and evaluation which began in 2018.
Rocket propelled grenade launchers
RPG-7		40mm	Soviet Union	Rocket-propelled grenade launcher	
RPG-18	RPG-18-cutaway	64mm	Soviet Union	Rocket-propelled grenade launcher	Single-shot disposable launcher.
RPG-22	RPG-22 at exhibition «Presence»	72.5mm	Soviet Union	Rocket propelled grenade launcher	Single-shot disposable launcher.
RPG-26		72.5mm	Soviet Union	Rocket propelled grenade launcher	Single-shot disposable launcher.
RPG-27		105mm	Soviet Union	Rocket propelled grenade launcher	Single-shot disposable launcher.
RPG-29		105mm	Soviet Union	Reusable rocket propelled grenade launcher	
RPG-28		125 mm	Russia	Rocket propelled grenade launcher	Single-shot disposable launcher.
RPG-30		105mm	Russia	Rocket propelled grenade launcher	Single-shot disposable launcher.
RPG-32		105mm	Russia	Reusable rocket-propelled grenade launcher	
Flamethrowers
MRO-A		72.5mm	Russia	Thermobaric rocket propelled grenade launcher	
RPO-A Shmel		93mm	Soviet Union/Russia	Thermobaric rocket propelled grenade launcher	
ATGM
9M111M Fagot-M		120mm	Soviet Union	Wire-guided anti-tank missile	Designated AT-4C "Spigot C" by NATO.
9M113M Konkurs-M		135mm	Soviet Union	Wire-guided anti-tank missile	Designated AT-5B "Spandrel B" by NATO.
9K115 Metis		94mm	Soviet Union	Wire-guided anti-tank missile	Designated AT-7 "Saxhorn" by NATO.
9М131 Metis-M/9М131M Metis-M1		130mm	Russia	Wire-guided anti-tank missile	Designated AT-13 "Saxhorn-2" by NATO.
9M133 Kornet		152mm	Russia	Beam-riding anti-tank guided missile	Designated AT-14 "Spriggan" by NATO.
MANPADS
9K34 Strela-3		75mm	Soviet Union	Man-portable air-defense system	Designated SA-14 "Gremlin" by NATO.
9K38 Igla	SA-18 misil y lanzador	72mm	Soviet Union	Man-portable air-defense system	Designated SA-18 "Grouse" by NATO.
9K38 Igla-S		72mm	Russia	Man-portable air-defense system	Designated SA-24 "Grinch" by NATO.
9K333 Verba		72mm	Russia	Man-portable air-defense system	Designated SA-29 "Gizmo" by NATO. Equipped with an automated fire control system.
Hand grenades
F1		55 mm	Soviet Union	Hand grenade	Some were used as booby-traps in the 2022 Russian invasion of Ukraine.
RGD-5		56 mm	Soviet Union	Hand grenade	Some were used as booby-traps in the 2022 Russian invasion of Ukraine.
RGN		60mm	Soviet Union	Hand grenade	4 meter kill radius, 3.8 second fuse, will detonate on impact after being armed for 1.8 seconds. Some were used as booby-traps in the 2022 Russian invasion of Ukraine.
RGO		60mm	Soviet Union	Hand grenade	6 meter kill radius, 3.8 second fuse, will detonate on impact after being armed for 1.8 seconds.
RDG-2			Soviet Union	Smoke grenade	
RDG-U			Russia	Smoke grenade	Accepted for supply in September 2023.
RKG-3	RKG-3	362 mm	Soviet Union	Anti-tank grenade	15–20 m effective firing range
Mines
MON-50		Tripwire/Command	Soviet Union	Anti-personnel mine	Propels ~485/540 steel projectiles to a kill radius of 50 meters.
MON-90		Tripwire/Command	Soviet Union	Anti-personnel mine	Propels ~2000 steel projectiles to a kill radius of 90 meters.
MON-100		Tripwire/Command	Soviet Union	Anti-personnel mine	Propels ~400 steel projectiles to a kill radius of 100 meters.
MON-200		Tripwire/Command	Soviet Union	Anti-personnel mine	A larger and more powerful version of the MON-100.
OZM		Tripwire/Command/Pressure	Soviet Union	Anti-personnel mine	~500g TNT, fragmentation mine.
POMZ		Tripwire/Command/Pressure	Soviet Union	Anti-personnel mine	~75g TNT, fragmentation mine.
PMN		Pressure	Soviet Union	Anti-personnel mine	~240g TNT, anti-personnel blast mine.
TM-46		Pressure	Soviet Union	Anti-tank mine	5.7 kg TNT.
TM-57		Pressure	Soviet Union	Anti-tank mine	6.3 kg TNT.
TM-62		Pressure	Soviet Union	Anti-tank mine	7.5 kg TNT.
TM-83		Seismic sensor/Optical sensor	Russia	Anti-tank mine	~13 kg TNT.
TM-89		Magnetic sensor	Russia	Anti-tank mine	~10 kg TNT.

== Artillery ==
Model	Image	Type	Quantity	Origin	Details
Mortars
2B14 Podnos		82 mm medium mortar	800+	Soviet Union	
2S12 Sani		120 mm heavy mortar	675	Soviet Union	500 in storage.
2B9 Vasilek		82 mm gun-mortar	?	Soviet Union	As of 25 October 2025 at least 21 have been lost in the Russian Invasion of Ukraine.
2B16 Nona-K		120 mm gun-mortar	75	Soviet Union	As of 25 October 2025, at least 16 have been lost in the Russian Invasion of Ukraine.
2S23 Nona-SVK		120 mm self-propelled gun-mortar	24	Soviet Union	As of 25 October 2025, at least 13 have been lost in the Russian Invasion of Ukraine.
2S34 Chosta		120 mm self-propelled gun-mortar	40	Russia	As of 25 October 2025, at least 4 have been lost in the Russian Invasion of Ukraine.
2S40 Floks		120 mm self-propelled gun-mortar	Some	Russia	
2S4 Tyulpan		240mm self-propelled mortar	39	Soviet Union	160 in storage. As of 25 October 2025, at least 61 have been lost in the Russian Invasion of Ukraine.
Field artillery
2A29 MT-12 Rapira		100 mm anti-tank gun	500	Soviet Union	800 T-12/M-12 in storage. As of 25 October 2025, at least 40 have been lost in the Russian Invasion of Ukraine.
2A18 D-30		122 mm howitzer	200	Soviet Union	1,000+ in storage. As of 25 October 2025, at least 176 have been lost in the Russian Invasion of Ukraine.
M-30		122 mm howitzer	50	Soviet Union	1,000+ in storage. As of 25 October 2025, at least 1 have been lost in the Russian Invasion of Ukraine.
M-46		130 mm howitzer	50	Soviet Union	300 in storage. As of 25 October 2025, at least 8 have been lost in the Russian Invasion of Ukraine.
D-1		152 mm howitzer	20+	Soviet Union	500 in storage.
D-20		152 mm gun-howitzer	50	Soviet Union	700 in storage. As of 25 October 2025, at least 53 have been lost in the Russian Invasion of Ukraine.
2A36 Giatsint-B		152 mm howitzer	150	Soviet Union	350 in storage. As of 25 October 2025, at least 64 have been lost in the Russian Invasion of Ukraine.
2A65 Msta-B		152 mm howitzer	150	Soviet Union	100 in storage. As of 25 October 2025, at least 130 have been lost in the Russian Invasion of Ukraine.
Self-propelled artillery
2S1 Gvozdika		122 mm Self-propelled howitzer	400	Soviet Union	1,000 in storage. As of 25 October 2025, at least 171 have been lost in the Russian Invasion of Ukraine.
2S3 Akatsiya		152 mm self-propelled howitzer	600	Soviet Union	500+ in storage. As of 25 October 2025, at least 190 have been lost in the Russian Invasion of Ukraine.
2S5 Giatsint-S		152 mm self-propelled howitzer	100	Soviet Union	300 in storage. As of 25 October 2025, at least 89 have been lost in the Russian Invasion of Ukraine.
2S19 Msta		152 mm self-propelled howitzer	450	Soviet Union; Russia	2S19/2S19M1 Msta-S and 2S19M2/2S33 Msta-SM variants used. 50 in storage. As of 25 October 2025, at least 254 2S19M1 and 54 2S19M2 have been lost in the Russian Invasion of Ukraine.
2S35 Koalitsiya-SV		152 mm self-propelled howitzer	≈8	Russia	State tests were completed on 20 October 2023, which allows to launch its mass production.
2S43 Malva		152 mm self-propelled howitzer	20	Russia	As of 25 October 2025, at least 3 have been lost in the Russian Invasion of Ukraine.
2S7 Pion		203 mm self-propelled howitzer	125	Soviet Union; Russia	75 modernized to the 2S7M Malka variant. 50+ in storage. As of 25 October 2025, at least 37 have been lost in the Russian Invasion of Ukraine.
Rocket artillery
BM-21 Grad		122 mm multiple rocket launcher	650	Soviet Union	700 in storage. As of 25 October 2025, at least 308 have been lost in the Russian Invasion of Ukraine.
9A53-G Tornado-G		122 mm multiple rocket launcher	200	Russia	As of 25 October 2025, at least 22 have been lost in the Russian Invasion of Ukraine.
BM-27 Uragan		220 mm multiple rocket launcher	175	Soviet Union	550 in storage. As of 25 October 2025, at least 98 have been lost in the Russian Invasion of Ukraine.
TOS-1A Solntsepyok		220 mm thermobaric multiple rocket launcher	36	Soviet Union; Russia	TOS-1 Buratino developed in the 1980s for the Soviet Army. Improved TOS-1A variant entered service in 2001–2003. As of 25 October 2025, at least 34 have been lost in the Russian Invasion of Ukraine.
TOS-2 Tosochka		220 mm thermobaric multiple rocket launcher	Some	Russia	As of 25 October 2025, at least 2 have been lost in the Russian Invasion of Ukraine.
TOS-3 Drakon		220 mm thermobaric multiple rocket launcher	Some	Russia	Undergoing trials.
BM-30 Smerch		300 mm multiple rocket launcher	100	Soviet Union	As of 25 October 2025, at least 3 have been lost in the Russian Invasion of Ukraine.
9K515 Tornado S		300 mm multiple rocket launcher	20	Russia	
Sarma		300 mm multiple rocket launcher	12	Russia	The first 12 systems ordered in 2024.
Uragan-1M		Universal 220 mm-300 mm multiple rocket launcher	6	Russia	Built to replace BM-27 Uragan and BM-30 Smerch.
Anti-aircraft artillery
ZU-23-2		23 mm towed anti-aircraft gun	?	Soviet Union	
AZP S-60		57 mm towed anti-aircraft gun	?	Soviet Union	
ZSU-23-4 Shilka		23 mm self-propelled anti-aircraft gun	100	Soviet Union	All kept in storage. As of 25 October 2025, at least 9 have been lost in the Russian Invasion of Ukraine.
Surface-to-air missiles
9K35M3 Strela-10M3/MN		Short range	300	Soviet Union	Designated SA-13 "Gopher" by NATO. As of 25 October 2025, at least 56 have been lost in the Russian Invasion of Ukraine.
9K22 Tunguska		Short range	190	Soviet Union	Designated SA-19 "Grison" by NATO. 50 in storage. As of 25 October 2025, at least 15 have been lost in the Russian Invasion of Ukraine.
9K33 Osa		Short range	100	Soviet Union	Designated SA-8 "Gecko" by NATO. 150 in storage. As of 25 October 2025, at least 32 have been lost in the Russian Invasion of Ukraine.
Tor missile system		Short range	129+	Soviet Union; Russia	Designated SA-15 "Gauntlet" by NATO. M1/M2/M2U/M2DT variants used. As of 25 October 2025, at least 68 have been lost in the Russian Invasion of Ukraine.
Buk missile system		Medium range	310	Soviet Union; Russia	100 in storage. As of 25 October 2025, at least 125 have been lost in the Russian Invasion of Ukraine.
Almaz Antey S-300/S-300V4		Long range	?	Soviet Union; Russia	Designated SA-12A/B "Gladiator/Giant" by NATO. As of 25 October 2025, at least 12 have been lost in the Russian Invasion of Ukraine.
Tactical ballistic missile systems
Fath 360		Short-range tactical ballistic missile	?	Iran	
Hwasong-11		Short-range tactical ballistic missile	About 50 missiles. A, B and C versions in service.	North Korea	
OTR-21 Tochka		Short-range tactical ballistic missile	50	Soviet Union	In 2022, it was estimated that Russia still had 200 missiles in service, even though they were largely replaced by the Iskander.
9K720 Iskander-M		Short-range tactical ballistic missile	162	Russia	9M728 and 9M729 Iskander-K cruise missiles are also used. About 600 Iskander-M ballistic missiles and 300 Iskander-K cruise missiles are stockpiled as of June 2025.

== Vehicles ==
Model	Image	Type	Quantity	Origin	Details
(2,100 T-55A/T-62M/T-62MV/T-64/T-72/T-72A/T-72B/T-80B/T80BV/T-80U in store)
T-54/T-55		Main battle tank	120	Soviet Union	Withdrawn from storage in the beginning of March 2023. T-54-3s, T-54Bs, T-54Ms, T-55As and T-55A Mod. 1981s were seen in videos on trains. At least one was converted into a remote-controlled VBIED and destroyed. As of 25 October 2025, at least 20 (2 T-54-3M, 2 T-54B, 9 T-55A and 7 of unknown variant) have been lost in the Russian invasion of Ukraine.
T-62		Main battle tank	600	Soviet Union; Russia	T-62, T-62M and T-62MV withdrawn from storage and participating in ongoing Russian invasion of Ukraine. As of 25 October 2025, at least 308 (8 T-62, 201 T-62M, 51 T-62MV and 48 of unknown variant) have been lost in the Russian invasion of Ukraine.
T-64		Main battle tank	50	Soviet Union; Russia	As of 25 October 2025, at least 99 (3 T-64A, 92 T-64BV, 3 T-64BVK and 1 of unknown variant) have been lost in the Russian invasion of Ukraine.
T-72		Main battle tank	1,000 (T-72A/AV/B/BA); 470 (T-72B3/B3M)	Soviet Union; Russia	Unknown number brought back from storage because of the losses during the Russian invasion of Ukraine and upgraded/rebuilt. As of 25 October 2025, at least 1783 (5 T-72 Ural, 48 T-72A, 28 T-72AV, 669 T-72B, 31 T-72BA, 793 T-72B3 and 209 of unknown variant) have been lost in the Russian invasion of Ukraine.
T-80		Main battle tank	250 (T-80BV/U); 350 (T-80BVM)	Soviet Union; Russia	Unknown number of tanks brought back from storage because of the losses during the Russian invasion of Ukraine and upgraded/rebuilt. As of 25 October 2025, at least 1223 (4 T-80B, 813 T-80BV, 5 T-80BVK, 105 T-80U, 2 T-80UK, 8 T-80UE-1, 1 T-80UM2, 241 T-80BVM and 44 of unknown variant) have been lost in the Russian invasion of Ukraine.
T-90		Main battle tank	some (T-90A/S); 620 (T-90M)	Russia	T-90M variant used. Some T-90A/S are also used. As of 25 October 2025, at least 202 (45 T-90A, 1 T-90AK, 11 T-90S and 145 T-90M) have been lost in the Russian invasion of Ukraine.
Infantry fighting vehicles (There are up to 3,000 BMP-1/2s in storage in addition to the numbers below)
BMP-1		Infantry fighting vehicle	750	Soviet Union	BMP-1 and BMP-1AM variants used. As of 25 October 2025, at least 1121 (950 BMP-1(P), 55 BMP-1 675sb3KDZ, 53 BMP-1AM, 59 BMP-1AM 675sb3KDZ and 4 BMP-1U Shkval) have been lost in the Russian invasion of Ukraine. An additional 342 losses in the list that are either BMP-1 or BMP-2, but for which a definitive classification as either cannot be made.
BMP-2		Infantry fighting vehicle	550	Soviet Union	BMP-2 and BMP-2M variants used. As of 25 October 2025, at least 2111 (1559 BMP-2(K), 18 BMP-2D, 454 BMP-2 675-sb3KDZ, 45 BMP-2M and 35 BMP-2M 675-sb3KDZ) have been lost in the Russian invasion of Ukraine. An additional 342 losses in the list that are either BMP-1 or BMP-2, but for which a definitive classification as either cannot be made.
BMP-3		Infantry fighting vehicle	650	Soviet Union; Russia	BMP-3 and BMP-3M variants used. As of 25 October 2025, at least 772 (516 BMP-3, 253 BMP-3 688A-sb6-2KP and 3 BMP-3 4S24 NKDZ) have been lost in the Russian invasion of Ukraine.
BMPT Terminator		Tank support combat vehicle	8+	Russia	As of 25 October 2025 at least 3 have been lost in the Russian invasion of Ukraine.
Tank destroyers
9P149 Shturm-S/SM		Mobile anti-tank guided missile system	?	Soviet Union	Based on the MT-LB chassis. As of 25 October 2025 at least 40 have been lost in the Russian Invasion of Ukraine.
9P157-2 Khrizantema-S/SP		Mobile anti-tank guided missile system	?	Russia	Based on the BMP-3 chassis.
9P163M-1 Kornet-T		Mobile anti-tank guided missile system	?	Russia	Based on the BMP-3 chassis. As of 25 October 2025 at least 2 have been lost in the Russian Invasion of Ukraine.
9P163-3 Kornet-D		Mobile anti-tank guided missile system	?	Russia	Based on the GAZ-2975 chassis.
M-2010 ATGM		Mobile anti-tank guided missile system	?	North Korea	
Reconnaissance
BRDM-2		Armoured scout car	Some	Soviet Union	100 BRDM-2/-2A, and 500 other variants kept in storage. As of 25 October 2025 at least 20 have been lost in the Russian Invasion of Ukraine.
BRM-1K		Command vehicle	200	Soviet Union	
Personnel carriers
MT-LB		Armoured personnel carrier	Active: 2,500 Reserve: 1,000	Soviet Union	At least 50 modernized MT-LB VM1K. As of 25 October 2025 at least 1837 (1467 MT-LB, 242 MT-LBVM and MT-LBVMK, 75 MT-LBs and variants with guns and rocket pods, 30 MT-LBu and 23 MT-LBM 6MB) have been lost in the Russian invasion of Ukraine.
BTR-50		Armoured personnel carrier		Soviet Union	Unknown number returned to service in 2023 to support the Russian invasion of Ukraine. As of 25 October 2025 at least 12 have been lost in the Russian invasion of Ukraine.
BTR-60		Armoured personnel carrier	Active: 800	Soviet Union	As of 25 October 2025, at least 2 BTR-60PB have been lost in the Russian Invasion of Ukraine.
BTR-70		Armoured personnel carrier	200	Soviet Union	As of 25 October 2025 at least 46 (27 BTR-70 and 19 BTR-70M) have been lost in the Russian Invasion of Ukraine.
BTR-80		Armoured personnel carrier	1,200	Soviet Union; Russia	As of 25 October 2025, at least 1638 (292 BTR-80, 865 BTR-82A(M), 389 BTR-82AT and 92 unknown BTR-80/BTR-82) have been lost in the Russian Invasion of Ukraine.
BTR-90		Armoured personnel carrier	12 or 80–139	Russia	Seen in use in the 2022 Russian invasion of Ukraine.
SBA-60K2 Bulat		Armoured personnel carrier	15–30	Russia	Another 50 vehicles on order.
KAMAZ-5350-379		Armoured personnel carrier	Unknown	Russia	It is equipped with the MM-501 armoured module.
BMO-T		Heavy flamethrower personnel carrier	Unknown	Russia	As of 25 October 2025 at least 4 have been lost in the Russian Invasion of Ukraine.
Ural Typhoon		Mine-resistant ambush-protected truck	237	Russia	Part of the Typhoon program.
Kamaz Typhoon		Mine-resistant ambush-protected truck		Russia	As of 25 October 2025 at least 43 (28 KamAZ-63968 Typhoon and 15 KamAZ-53949 Typhoon-K) have been lost in the Russian Invasion of Ukraine.
Logistics and utility
Z-STS Akhmat		Infantry mobility vehicle	More than 150	Russia	As of 25 October 2025 at least 84 have been lost in the Russian Invasion of Ukraine.
AMN-590951 Spartak (VPK-Ural)		Infantry mobility vehicle	Several hundreds (reportedly)	Russia	
LSTC-1944 Sarmat-3		Infantry mobility vehicle	Unknown	Russia	In service since late 2024 with the special forces and the airborne troops.
Ulan		Light tactical transporter	Unknown	Russia	Built on civilian automotive platforms. Ulan-2 also in service since late 2025.
Tigr		Infantry mobility vehicle	2,000	Russia	Organic 4x4 LUV of the Russian Armed Forces. Tigr-M variant entered service in the first half of 2013. As of 25 October 2025 at least 23 Tigr and 246 Tigr-M's (of all variants from all manufacturers, etc.) have been lost in the Russian Invasion of Ukraine.
Asteis		Infantry mobility vehicle	Unknown	Russia	Entered service in May 2024.
Iveco LMV		Infantry mobility vehicle	418	Italy	Production halted. As of 25 October 2025, at least 34 have been lost in the Russian Invasion of Ukraine.
Linza		Combat Ambulance	Unknown	Russia	Deliveries started in 2020. As of 25 October 2025, at least 14 have been lost in the Russian Invasion of Ukraine.
UAZ-452		Light utility vehicle	Unknown	Soviet Union	As of 25 October 2025 at least 139 have been lost in the Russian Invasion of Ukraine.
UAZ-469		Light utility vehicle	Unknown	Soviet Union	As of 25 October 2025, at least 42 have been lost in the Russian Invasion of Ukraine.
UAZ-3132		Light utility vehicle	Unknown	Russia	
UAZ Patriot		Light utility vehicle	Unknown	Russia	Partial replacement of UAZ-469. As of 25 October 2025, at least 7 have been lost in the Russian Invasion of Ukraine.
Desertcross 1000-3		Utility terrain vehicle	2,100 purchased	China	85-horsepower ATV lacking weapons and armor, nicknamed ″golf carts″ by Forbes.
E-scooter		E-scooter	Unknown		Electric scooters are one of the typically civilian vehicles used by Russian soldiers in the Russian invasion of Ukraine, where they are used for transport on the front. Electrek speculated that the continued loss of armored vehicles may have played a role in Russia adopting such vehicles for its military.
Dirt bike		Motorcycle	Unknown	China; Belarus	Began being issued to Russian front-line soldiers in spring 2024 to help mitigate growing shortages of armored vehicles.
Haval H9		Sport utility vehicle	Unknown	China	Locally produced. It has won the tender to become the main SUV of the Army and it is being massively supplied.
ASMP Luidor		Special vehicle	Unknown	Russia	It is based on a GAZelle vehicle.
KamAZ-43501		Light cargo truck	Unknown	Russia	
Ural		Light cargo truck	Unknown	Russia	As of 25 October 2025, at least 200 Ural-43206, 23 Ural Federal, 5 Ural-5323, 1 Ural-532301, 41 Ural-63704-0010 Tornado-U and 1 Ural-542301 have been lost in the Russian Invasion of Ukraine.
GAZ-33097		Light cargo truck	Unknown	Russia	
GAZ-3308		Light cargo truck	Unknown	Russia	
Ural-4320		Medium cargo truck	8000+	Soviet Union	As of 25 October 2025, at least 1348 trucks and 190 tankers have been lost in the Russian Invasion of Ukraine.
KamAZ-5350		Medium cargo truck	Unknown	Russia	As of 25 October 2025 at least 8 have been lost in the Russian Invasion of Ukraine.
KamAZ-65115		Medium cargo truck	Unknown	Russia	
ZIL-4334		Medium cargo truck	Unknown	Russia	
KamAZ-6350		Heavy cargo truck	Unknown	Russia	As of 25 October 2025 at least 19 have been lost in the Russian Invasion of Ukraine.
Ural-5323		Heavy cargo truck	Unknown	Russia	
KamAZ-65225		Heavy tractor unit	Unknown	Russia	
PTS		Amphibious tracked transport carrier	Unknown	Soviet Union	PTS-4 variant passed tests in 2011. As of 25 October 2025 at least 16 have been lost in the Russian Invasion of Ukraine.
DT30 Vityaz		Articulated tracked transport vehicle	Unknown	Soviet Union	
GAZ-3351 Los'		Articulated tracked transport vehicle	Unknown	Russia	
GAZ-3344		Articulated tracked transport vehicle	Unknown	Russia	
Plastun-SN		All-terrain tracked vehicles	Unknown	Russia	
School bus		Civilian bus	Unknown	Russia	
Military engineering
BREM-1; BREM-1M		Armoured recovery vehicle	Unknown	Soviet Union; Russia	As of 25 October 2025 at least 102 have been lost in the Russian Invasion of Ukraine.
BREM-L "Beglianka"		Armoured recovery vehicle	Unknown	Russia	
BREM-K		Wheeled armoured recovery vehicle	Unknown	Russia	As of 25 October 2025 at least 4 have been lost in the Russian Invasion of Ukraine.
REM-KL		Wheeled armoured recovery vehicle	Unknown	Russia	Based on an all-terrain vehicle URAL-532362. As of 25 October 2025 at least 17 have been lost in the Russian Invasion of Ukraine.
REM-KC		Repair and recovery vehicle	Unknown	Russia	Based On a BAZ-6910 Chassis.
IRM "Zhuk"		Engineer reconnaissance vehicle	Unknown	Soviet Union	
BAT-2		Combat engineering vehicle	Unknown	Soviet Union	As of 25 October 2025 at least 16 have been lost in the Russian Invasion of Ukraine.
IMR-2; IMR-3M		Combat engineering vehicle	Unknown	Soviet Union; Russia	As of 25 October 2025 at least 51 have been lost in the Russian Invasion of Ukraine.
UBIM		Combat engineering vehicle		Russia	Entered service in 2026. Based on the T-90. Replacement for legacy ARV, IMR and BMR vehicles.
KRVD/MRTO-I/PIRK/MTO-UB and PARM-1AM1		Combat engineering vehicle/Mobile repair complexes	Unknown	Russia	The first 4 are based on a KAMAZ-63501 and URAL-4320 or KAMAZ-5350 vehicles.
MTU-72; MTU-90		Tracked armoured vehicle-launched bridge	Unknown	Soviet Union; Russia	As of 25 October 2025 at least 9 MTU-72 have been lost in the Russian Invasion of Ukraine.
TMM-3		Wheeled vehicle-launched bridge	Unknown	Russia	TMM-3M2 variant replacing TMM-3M entered service in 2016 and is based on a KAMAZ-53501 vehicle. As of 25 October 2025 at least 29 have been lost in the Russian Invasion of Ukraine.
TMM-6		Wheeled vehicle-launched bridge	Unknown	Russia	
GMZ-3		Minelayer	Unknown	Soviet Union	As of 25 October 2025 at least 9 have been lost in the Russian Invasion of Ukraine.
MKDM		Minelayer	Unknown	Russia	Based on the Rosomakha quadbike.
BMR-3M		Armoured mine clearing vehicle	Unknown	Russia	Russian Defense Ministry said six were delivered in November 2018.
MICR (МИКР)/EOV-25321/TO-25 and TO-18		Mine clearing vehicle/Excavator/Tractors	Unknown	Russia	
UR-77 Meteorit; UR-07		Armoured mine-clearing line charge launcher	Unknown	Soviet Union; Russia	As of 25 October 2025 at least 37 have been lost in the Russian Invasion of Ukraine.
BAZ-6403		Tank transporter	Unknown	Russia	
Ural-63704		Tank transporter	Unknown	Russia	
MDK-3		Trencher	Unknown	Soviet Union	As of 25 October 2025 at least 3 have been lost in the Russian Invasion of Ukraine.
BTM-3		Trencher	Unknown	Soviet Union	As of 25 October 2025 at least 1 has been lost in the Russian Invasion of Ukraine.
PBU-100		Drilling vehicle	Unknown	Russia	
B10M2S and BTS-150B		Armored bulldozer/Tracked drilling rig	Unknown	Russia	B10M2S is in the image.
EOV-4421		Wheeled excavator	Unknown	Soviet Union	KrAZ-255B chassis.
EOV-3521		Wheeled excavator	Unknown	Russia	As of 25 October 2025 at least 28 have been lost in the Russian Invasion of Ukraine.
EOV-3523		Wheeled excavator	Unknown	Russia	As of 25 October 2025 at least 23 have been lost in the Russian Invasion of Ukraine.
KMV-10K		Wheeled crane	Unknown	Russia	KMV-10K is a 4-tons crane truck based on a KAMAZ-5350 vehicle. Entered service in 2018. As of 25 October 2025 at least 8 (KMV-10V) have been lost in the Russian Invasion of Ukraine.
KS-55729-7M/KS-45719-7M		Wheeled crane	Unknown	Russia	KS-55729-7M and KS-45719-7M are based on a KAMAZ-5350 vehicle. As of 25 October 2025 at least 9 have been lost in the Russian Invasion of Ukraine.
KS-45731		Wheeled crane	Unknown	Russia	Based on a KAMAZ-53501 vehicle.
KS-3574/M3		Wheeled crane	Unknown	Russia	
KS-3574/M1		Wheeled crane	Unknown	Russia	
PMP		Floating bridge	Unknown	Soviet Union	PPS-84 and PMP-2M variants are in production. As of 25 October 2025 at least 68 (all equipment related to PMP) have been lost in the Russian Invasion of Ukraine.
PP-2005		Pontoon bridge	Unknown	Russia	Successor to the PMP Floating Bridge. It is based on a KAMAZ-63501 vehicle. As of 25 October 2025 at least 63 (all equipment related to PP-2005 and PP-91) have been lost in the Russian Invasion of Ukraine.
PP-91		Pontoon bridge	Unknown	Russia	
IDK/BMK-MO and MT/Rotan/SNL-8		Engineering-landing craft/Motorboats/Boats	Unknown	Russia	As of 25 October 2025 at least 15 have been lost in the Russian Invasion of Ukraine.
		Inflatable military dummy	Unknown	Russia	MKT-2P camouflage kit is also supplied.
Special military equipment
TDA-2K		Smoke vehicle	Unknown	Soviet Union	
TDA-3		Smoke vehicle	Unknown	Russia	It is based on a KAMAZ-5350. RPZ-8h smoke fields control equipment. As of 25 October 2025 at least 3 have been lost in the Russian Invasion of Ukraine.
UTM-80M		Decontamination vehicle	Unknown	Russia	
ARS-14		Decontamination vehicle	50–100	Russia	It is based on a KAMAZ.
DKV-K		Degassing Kit	Unknown	Russia	
USSO/KRPP/UKSOD		Decontamination vehicle/Special process control system/Universal data collection and processing system	Unknown	Russia	They are carried by KamAZ trucks. UKSOD is carried by a Tigr vehicle.
TMS-65		Decontamination vehicle	Unknown	Soviet Union; Russia	It is carried by a Ural-375 vehicle.
BPM-97/KAMAZ-43269		Armoured reconnaissance vehicle	100+	Russia	As of 25 October 2025, at least 6 have been lost in the Russian Invasion of Ukraine.
SANR-10M "Pantera"		Armoured reconnaissance vehicle	Unknown	Russia	M1 variant is in production.
BRM-3K "Rys"		Armoured reconnaissance vehicle	Unknown	Russia	
BRM-1K		Armoured reconnaissance vehicle	700	Soviet Union	Currently under modernisation. As of 25 October 2025 at least 48 BRM-1(K), 1 BRM-1 675sb3KDZ, 6 BRM-1KM and 2 BRM-1KM 675sb3KDZ have been lost in the Russian invasion of Ukraine.
RKhM-6 Povozka		Armoured chemical reconnaissance vehicle	Unknown	Russia	It is being superseded by RKhM-8 based on Tigr and RKhM-9 based on Typhoon vehicles. As of 25 October 2025 at least 11 have been lost in the Russian Invasion of Ukraine.
RKhM-4		Armoured chemical reconnaissance vehicle	Unknown	Russia	
RPM-2		Armoured chemical reconnaissance vehicle	Unknown	Russia	
1V12M and 1V152		Artillery command-reconnaissance vehicles	Unknown	Russia	1V12M is in the photo.
PRP-4		Artillery reconnaissance vehicle	Unknown	Soviet Union	
PRP-4A Argus		Artillery reconnaissance vehicle	Unknown	Russia	
AZK-7		Artillery sound-measuring reconnaissance system	Unknown	Russia	It is carried by 4 Ural-43203 vehicles. It is reportedly supplemented since July 2026 by the Zavarukha portable acoustic reconnaissance system.
Zavet		Automated control system for anti-tank formations	Unknown	Russia	Deliveries started March 2021.
R-149AKSh		Command-staff vehicle	Unknown	Russia	It is based on a KAMAZ-5350 vehicle. As of 25 October 2025 at least 23 have been lost in the Russian Invasion of Ukraine.
MPPU		Command-staff vehicle	Unknown	Russia	
Akatsiya-ME		Command-staff vehicle	Unknown	Russia	
R-177M		Command and control vehicle	Unknown	Russia	Ordered in August 2023.
1B110		Command-staff vehicle	Unknown	Russia	
R-166		Armoured command-staff vehicle	Unknown	Russia	It is based on BTR-80 or a KAMAZ-5350 vehicle. As of 25 October 2025 at least 24 have been lost in the Russian Invasion of Ukraine.
R-149MA1/A3		Armoured command-staff vehicle	500+	Russia	As of 25 October 2025 at least 127 (86 R-149MA1 and 41 R-149MA3) have been lost in the Russian Invasion of Ukraine.
R-149BMR		Armoured command-staff vehicle	Unknown	Russia	As of 25 October 2025 at least 4 have been lost in the Russian Invasion of Ukraine.
R-145BM/1/A		Armoured command-staff vehicle	Unknown	Soviet Union; Russia	As of 25 October 2025 at least 13 have been lost in the Russian Invasion of Ukraine.
AM-1/Medovukha and P-230T/P-234PMB		All-terrain vehicle/Mobile telecommunications system and command-staff vehicle/Mobile field system	More than 50/Unknown	Russia	Four-wheelers, used by special forces. Built on a Tigr vehicle. The P-230T is visible in the photo. As of 25 October 2025 at least 3 (P-230T) have been lost in the Russian Invasion of Ukraine.
R-439MD2		Satellite communication station	Unknown	Russia	As of 25 October 2025 at least 2 have been lost in the Russian Invasion of Ukraine.
R-441-LM/OV Liven/Digital mobile complex of cellular communication/APE-3/5/P-244 and 243P/R-423AM		Satellite communication stations/Mobile communications-control stations/Digital mobile complex of secret telephone communication and mobile super-protected telecommunications complex/Mobile tropospheric communication station	Unknown	Russia	Based on Ural-375 or a KAMAZ chassis respectively.(software manufactured by defence contractor Rusbitech). As of 25 October 2025 at least 1 (R-441) has been lost in the Russian Invasion of Ukraine.
Legenda/P-240 Pereselenets/MT-67M and R-142/PNGK-1M/Radii-BRC		Satellite communication station/Digital communication complex/Command-staff vehicles/Mobile navigation-geodetic system/Mobile protection system	Unknown	Russia	Pereselenets and R-142 mounted on a KAMAZ-53501 vehicle. As of 25 October 2025 at least 1 (P-240) has been lost in the Russian Invasion of Ukraine.
Radiolampa/R-160/R-448M Auriga-1.2V/P-390M3/Torn		Intelligence system/Medium power communications station/Satellite communications system and a component of the MK VTR-016 (МК ВТР-016) mobile video transmission system/courier-postal vehicle/Mobile radio reconnaissance system	Unknown	Russia	
P-260 Redut-2US		Autonomous telecommunications complex	Unknown	Russia	As of 25 October 2025 at least 1 (P-260) has been lost in the Russian Invasion of Ukraine.
R-419L1		Communications vehicle	Unknown	Russia	It is carried by a KAMAZ-4350 vehicle. Upgraded L1M version based on a KAMAZ-5350 vehicle is delivered. As of 25 October 2025 at least 3 have been lost in the Russian Invasion of Ukraine.
R-419MP Andromeda-D/R-419GM/R-416GM/TSRRS/Granit-M		Radio-relay stations	Unknown	Russia	R-419MP is in the photo. More than 20 R-416 were ordered in August 2021 to be delivered in 2022–2023. TSRRS and Granit-M are based on a KAMAZ-5350 vehicle.
Predel-E		Coastal defence radar	Unknown	Russia	Video recording shows at least 1 has been lost in the Russian Invasion of Ukraine. As of 25 October 2025, according to Oryx list, at least 1 has been lost in the Russian Invasion of Ukraine.
1L122 Garmony		Air surveillance radar	Unknown	Russia	Portable version is supplied.
Nebo-SV/S; Nebo-M		Air surveillance radar		Soviet Union; Russia	As of 25 October 2025 at least 5 (3 1L119 Nebo-SVU and 2 55Zh6U Nebo-U) have been lost in the Russian Invasion of Ukraine.
9S18 Kupol/9S18M1		Target acquisition radar	Unknown	Soviet Union; Russia	As of 25 October 2025 at least 5 have been lost in the Russian Invasion of Ukraine.
9S15 Obzor		Target acquisition radar for S-300V	Unknown	Soviet Union; Russia	
Zoopark-1		Counter-battery radar	Unknown	Russia	As of 25 October 2025 at least 25 have been lost in the Russian Invasion of Ukraine.
Barnaul-T		Air defence battle management system	Unknown	Russia	As of 25 October 2025 at least 8 (all equipment related to Barnaul-T) have been lost in the Russian Invasion of Ukraine.
Polyana-D4		Air defence battle management system	Unknown	Soviet Union	
9S737М Ranzhir-M		Air defence battle management system	Unknown	Soviet Union	
PPRU-1 Ovod-M-SV		Air defence battle management system	Unknown	Soviet Union	
1L269 Krasukha-2		Mobile electronic warfare complex	Unknown	Russia	
Dzyudoist		Mobile electronic warfare complex	Unknown	Russia	
R-330Zh Zhitel' and R-330M1P "Diabazol"		Mobile electronic warfare complexes	Unknown	Russia	Based on a KAMAZ vehicle. As of 25 October 2025 at least 23 R-330ZH and 1 R-330M1P have been lost in the Russian Invasion of Ukraine.
Spectre		Mobile electronic warfare complex	Unknown	Russia	It is carried by a Tigr all-terrain vehicle.
Altayets		Mobile electronic warfare complex	Unknown	Russia	
1RL257 Krasukha-4		Mobile electronic warfare complex	Unknown	Russia	As of 25 October 2025 at least 1 has been lost in the Russian Invasion of Ukraine.
1L267 Moskva-1		Mobile electronic warfare complex	Unknown	Russia	
1L262 Rtut-BM		Mobile electronic warfare complex	Unknown	Russia	It is based on a MT-LB vehicle.
Murmansk-BN/Palantin-K/Pole-21/LGSH-689/Groza-04 YU/Crab		Mobile electronic warfare complexes	Unknown	Russia	As of 25 October 2025 at least 3 (Palantin) have been lost in the Russian Invasion of Ukraine.
Leer-2		Mobile electronic warfare complex	Unknown	Russia	It is carried by a Tigr all-terrain vehicle. As of 25 October 2025 at least 6 have been lost in the Russian Invasion of Ukraine.
Borisoglebsk 2		Mobile electronic warfare complex	Unknown	Russia	As of 25 October 2025 at least 20 R-330BMV and R-394BMV Borisoglebsk-2B have been lost in the Russian Invasion of Ukraine.
RB-341V Leer-3		Mobile electronic countermeasures complex	Unknown	Russia	It is equipped with 3 Orlan-10 unmanned aerial vehicles for communications jamming and for SIGINT. As of 25 October 2025 at least 3 have been lost in the Russian Invasion of Ukraine.
Volna Kupol Garant		Mobile electronic countermeasures complex	Unknown	Russia	Targets Starlink system.
K-612-O/KDKhR-1N		Nuclear explosions detection station/Chemical analysis station	Unknown	Soviet Union	K-612-O is in the photo. KDKhR-1N is based on MT-LBu vehicle.
Silok/Bushprit		Anti-drone EW complex/Automated UAVs control system	Unknown	Russia	As of 25 October 2025 at least 5 have been lost in the Russian Invasion of Ukraine.
RAST-3K		Computational and analytical station of the CBRN protection troops	Unknown	Russia	It is carried by a Kamaz-5350 vehicle.
PM RKhBZ-1		CBRN protection troops mobile repair shop	Unknown	Russia	It is carried by a Kamaz-5350 vehicle. KRPP-2 control-distribution mobile point based on a Kamaz cross-country vehicle.
RPMK-1 Ulibkа-М/PTTS-1 Volynets/MES-BTM/AP-3/USSA-1845		Meteorological system/Mobile digital technological system/Electronic special equipment workshop/Medical system/Ambulance	Unknown	Russia	They are carried by a KamAZ or a Ural vehicle respectively. RPMK-1 Ulibka-M is in the photo.
SKO-10 Gigiena		Water treatment station	Unknown	Russia	It is carried by a KamAZ-6350 or Ural-5323 truck.
ESD-100/ED-30 AI		Mobile electric generators	Unknown	Russia	
Armoured Trains
Amur		Armoured train	1	Russia	Built in 2016 and retrofitted in 2022 for the Russian invasion of Ukraine to serve for rear-line logistical support.
Baikal		Armoured train	1	Russia	Built in 2016 and retrofitted in 2022 for the Russian invasion of Ukraine to serve for front-line logistical and fire support.
Volga		Armoured train	1	Russia	Built in 2022 for the Russian invasion of Ukraine to serve for rear-line anti-mine countermeasure and anti-sabotage operations.
Yenisei		Armoured train	1	Russia; Ukraine	Built in 2022 for the Russian invasion of Ukraine to serve for rear-line and front-line logistical and fire support. Accused of being built out of Ukrainian materials.

== Unmanned vehicles ==
Model	Image	Type	Quantity	Origin	Details
Unmanned ground vehicles
MRK-65		Reconnaissance	Unknown	Russia	
MRK-46		Reconnaissance/Mine clearing	Unknown	Russia	
MRK-RKh and MRK-35MA		Chemical reconnaissance and reconnaissance/Mine clearing	Unknown	Russia	MRK-RKh is in the photo.
Mobile remotely controlled platform		Multifunctional	Unknown	Russia	It can supply ammunitions, deliver cargoes, conduct mining and demining of terrain and remote detonation.
Scarab and Sphere		Reconnaissance/Mine clearing	Unknown	Russia	
Kapitan		Reconnaissance/Mine clearing	Unknown	Russia	
Scorpion-M		Kamikaze/Multi-role	Unknown	Russia	
Lyagushka		Kamikaze	Unknown	Russia	It carries 30 kg of explosives with a speed of 20 km/h.
Krot		Kamikaze	Unknown	Russia	
Cobra-1600		Reconnaissance/Mine clearing	Unknown	Russia	
Uran-6		Demining	Unknown	Russia	At least 1 has been lost in the Russian invasion of Ukraine.
Prokhod-1		Demining	Unknown	Russia	The system includes a robotic BMR-3MA tracked mine clearing vehicle and a Kamaz-based command vehicle.
MRK-3		Combat support/Patrol	Unknown	Russia	
Argo		Combat support/Patrol	Unknown	Russia	
Uran-14		Multifunction engineering machine	Unknown	Russia	
Yozhik		Combat reconnaissance	Unknown	Russia	
MK750 Kaluzhanin		Cargo transport	Unknown	Russia	Completed trials and entered series production in October 2024.
Varan		Combat support	300 annually (plan)	Russia	Carrier of various weapon and EW systems. Production launched in 2024.
Omich		Multifunctional/Combat	Unknown	Russia	Equipped with a flamethrower. In use since December 2025.
Nerekhta		Multifunctional/Combat	Unkhown	Russia	The first Russian combat robot.
Unmanned Combat Aerial Vehicles
Orlan-10		Unmanned Combat Aerial Vehicle	Over 1000	Russia	It is deployed from a specialised Kamaz truck or from launchers on the basis of the Tigr vehicles. Can be armed with four VOG-17 fragmentation grenades. A version called Moskit is used for EW. As of 25 October 2025 at least 239 (all equipment related to Orlan-10) have been lost in the Russian Invasion of Ukraine.
Inferno		Unmanned Combat Aerial Vehicle	Hundreds (January 2024)	Russia	FPV drone. Can be armed with GP-25 grenades.
Ovod-S		Unmanned Combat Aerial Vehicle		Russia	Available in various configurations.
Night witch		Unmanned Combat Aerial Vehicle		Russia	Strike multi-rotor hexacopter. Carries 4 munitions. First 50 delivered in August 2024.
Zanoza		Unmanned Combat Aerial Vehicle		Russia	Heavy strike drone which can carry up to 10 kg of payload. Night Witch and Zanoza are branded as the Groza drones alongside the Sova reconnaissance drone and the Slon cargo copter.
Privet-82/Molniya		Unmanned Combat Aerial Vehicles		Russia	Privet-82XL and Molniya-2 heavier versions in production.
Prince Vandal of Novgorod		Unmanned Combat Aerial Vehicle		Russia	Fiber-optic controlled FPV drone.
Prince Vladimir Svyatoslavovich		Unmanned Combat Aerial Vehicle		Russia	Mid-range strike drone which reportedly entered production in March 2026.
Forpost-R		Unmanned Combat Aerial Vehicles		Russia	As of 25 October 2025, at least 6 (all variants) have been lost in the Russian Invasion of Ukraine.
Kronshtadt Orion 'Inokhodets'		Unmanned Combat Aerial Vehicles		Russia	Tested over Ukraine border in December 2021.
Mohajer-6 ''M6''		Unmanned Combat Aerial Vehicles	Unknown	Iran	Reportedly bought and used by Russia during the 2022 Russian invasion of Ukraine. This has been indirectly confirmed on 23 September 2022, when Ukrainian anti-air defenses shot down a Mohajer-6 in the Black Sea near the coast of Odesa. It can be armed with four Ghaem-1, 5 and 9, Sadid-345 or Sadid PGMs or four Almas-1/2 AGTMs or four Hydra 70/Fadak 80 (guided) rocket pods.
Luch Korsar		Unmanned Combat Aerial Vehicles	2 (one was found destroyed in Ukraine on 9 November 2022)	Russia	Supposedly capable of carrying two Aviaavtomatika PGMs, or two 9M113 Konkurs or 9K121 Vikhr ATGMs. Tested but not operationally deployed.
Unmanned aerial vehicles
Geran-2		Kamikaze-type unmanned aerial vehicle	Unknown	Iran	Russian designation for Iranian Shahed-136 kamikaze drone. Both Russia and Iran have denied these are built in Iran. They are license built in Russia.
Geran-1		Kamikaze-type unmanned aerial vehicle	Unknown	Iran	Russian designation for Iranian Shahed 131 kamikaze drone. Both Russia and Iran have denied these are built in Iran. They are license built in Russia.
Geran-3		Kamikaze-type unmanned aerial vehicle	Unknown	Iran/Russia	Russian designation for Iranian Shahed-138 jet-powered kamikaze drone. Small-scale serial production started in April 2025.
Geran-4		Kamikaze-type unmanned aerial vehicle	Unknown	Russia	In use since May 2026. Jet-powered.
Geran-5		Kamikaze-type unmanned aerial vehicle	Unknown	Russia	Russian version of the Iranian Karrar jet-powered drone equipped with a Chinese jet engine and a 200-pound warhead. Use started in January 2026.
Garpiya		Kamikaze-type unmanned aerial vehicle	Unknown	Russia	Russian version of the Iranian HESA Shahed 136 drone equipped with a Chinese engine.
Tyuvik		Kamikaze-type unmanned aerial vehicle	Unknown	Russia	A smaller and domestically developed version of Geran drones which reportedly entered production in May 2025.
BM-35		Kamikaze-type unmanned aerial vehicle	Unknown	Russia	500 km range when equipped with a Starlink terminal.
BM-70		Kamikaze-type unmanned aerial vehicle	Unknown	Russia	In use since July 2026. According to Russian sources, its range is up to 100 km.
Vogan		Kamikaze-type unmanned aerial vehicle	Unknown	Russia	Multi-role heavy drone started to be used in late 2025.
Upyr		Kamikaze-type unmanned aerial vehicle	Unknown	Russia	Mass-produced FPV-type strike and logistics drone.
Hortenzia		Kamikaze-type multi-role unmanned aerial vehicle	Unknown	Russia	Mass-produced.
Piranha		Kamikaze-type multi-role unmanned aerial vehicle	Unknown	Russia	FPV drone.
Skvorets		Kamikaze-type unmanned aerial vehicle	Unknown	Russia	Fiber-optic drone.
UN-001		Unmanned training aerial vehicle	Unknown	Russia	Passed acceptance in June 2026 according to Russian media.
Kartograf		Unmanned reconnaissance aerial vehicle	Unknown	Russia	As of 25 October 2025 at least 20 have been lost in the Russian Invasion of Ukraine.
Boomerang		Unmanned reconnaissance aerial vehicle	Unknown	Russia	FPV drone mass-produced since 2023.
Merlin-VR		Unmanned reconnaissance aerial vehicle	Unknown	Russia	
Goliath/Karakurt		Mini unmanned reconnaissance aerial vehicles	Unknown	Russia	
Yolka		Unmanned aerial vehicle-interceptor	Unknown	Russia	Claimed in use since at least May 2025.
Molniya-PVO		Unmanned aerial vehicle-interceptor	Unknown	Russia	Claimed in use since June 2026.
Lys-2		Unmanned aerial vehicle-interceptor	Unknown	Russia	In use since April 2026.
Sokol-I		Unmanned aerial vehicle-interceptor	Unknown	Russia	In use since March 2026 according to Russian state sources.
BPLA400T		Unmanned reconnaissance aerial vehicle	Unknown	Russia	Equipped with a thermal camera.
Knyaz Veshchiy Oleg		Unmanned reconnaissance aerial vehicle	Unknown	Russia	
V2U		Kamikaze-type unmanned aerial vehicle	Unknown	Russia	Uses artificial intelligence.
Dan-M		Kamikaze-type jet-powered unmanned aerial vehicle	Unknown	Russia	Converted from aerial targets.
Gerbera		Kamikaze-type multi-role unmanned aerial vehicle	Unknown	Russia	Extensively used.
Veles		Unmanned reconnaissance/strike aerial vehicle	1,500 a month (September 2024)	Russia	Modular FPV-drone.
Supercam S350		Unmanned reconnaissance aerial vehicle	Unknown	Russia	As of 25 October 2025, at least 127 have been lost in the Russian Invasion of Ukraine.
Yakovlev Pchela		Unmanned aerial vehicle	92	Russia	
ZALA 421-16E/M		Unmanned aerial vehicle	Unknown	Russia	As of 25 October 2025 at least 194 have been lost in the Russian Invasion of Ukraine.
ZALA 421-08/Strekoza		Unmanned aerial vehicle	400	Russia	
Orlan-30		Unmanned aerial vehicle	Unknown	Russia	As of 25 October 2025 at least 27 have been lost in the Russian Invasion of Ukraine.
Eleron-10		Unmanned aerial vehicle	Unknown	Russia	As of 25 October 2025 at least 4 have been lost in the Russian Invasion of Ukraine.
Eleron-7		Unmanned aerial vehicle	Unknown	Russia	
Eleron-3		Unmanned aerial vehicle	Unknown	Russia	It can be used for reconnaissance and for jamming. As of 25 October 2025 at least 39 (Eleron-3 and Eleron-3SV) have been lost in the Russian Invasion of Ukraine.
Dragonfly		Sapper reconnaissance UAV	Unknown	Russia	
DJI Phantom 3		Tactical reconnaissance UAV	Unknown	China	
Grusha		Unmanned aerial vehicle	Unknown	Russia	
Granat		Unmanned aerial vehicle	Unknown	Russia	Granat-2 and 4 in service. Granat-4 is in the photo. As of 25 October 2025 at least 11 (Granat-3 and Granat-4) have been lost in the Russian Invasion of Ukraine.
Takhion		Unmanned aerial vehicle	Unknown	Russia	As of 25 October 2025 at least 7 have been lost in the Russian Invasion of Ukraine.
Zastava		Unmanned aerial vehicle	Unknown	Russia	
		Helicopter-type unmanned aerial vehicle	More than 40	Russia	
ZALA Kub		Kamikaze-type unmanned aerial vehicle	Unknown	Russia	
ZALA Lancet		Kamikaze-type unmanned aerial vehicle	Unknown	Russia	
Scalpel		Kamikaze-type unmanned aerial vehicle	20 a month (November 2023)	Russia	A cheaper and downgraded analogue of Lancet which entered small scale production in November 2023.
Gastello		Kamikaze-type unmanned aerial vehicle	Unknown	Russia	Production started in August 2023 with a components localization of 30% which is aimed to be increased to 95% in the next months.
Veter		Kamikaze-type unmanned aerial vehicle	6000 (August 2024)	Russia	FPV drone reportedly equipped with AI. 3000 drones a month stated production capacity. Veter-8, 10 and 13 versions.
Microbe		Kamikaze-type unmanned aerial vehicle	Unknown	Russia	Deployed extensively.
K-8 Dvushka		Kamikaze-type unmanned aerial vehicle	Unknown	Russia	Fielding started in July 2026.
Svarog		Heavy-lift logistics unmanned aerial vehicle	Unknown	Russia	Allegedly capable to carry up to 50 kg of cargo at night. Introduced in August 2025.
OsA Okta		Logistics unmanned aerial vehicle	Unknown	Russia	Reportedly able to carry up to 13 kg of cargo. Introduced in January 2026.
Chornyy Korshun and Gorynych/Parodiya		Logistics unmanned aerial vehicles/Decoy drone	Unknown	Russia	

== Individual equipment ==
Model	Image	Type	Origin	Details
Uniform equipment
VSR camouflage pattern		Camouflage pattern	Soviet Union	Extremely limited use. Seen on ammo pouches in 2020.
Flora camouflage pattern		Camouflage pattern	Russia	Limited use.
EMR camouflage pattern		Camouflage pattern	Russia	Introduced as a unified camouflage pattern and uniform for entire armed forces in 2008.
Multicam		Camouflage pattern	Russia	In 2023 was adopted as a standard camouflage of the new army field uniform. Has been in use by special forces beforehand. Over 200,000 sets on order as of early 2024.
6B48 Ratnik-ZK		AFV crew individual protection kit	Russia	Introduced as part of the Ratnik infantry combat system.
Barmitsa		Infantry combat system	Russia	Broadly fielded. Barmitsa is on the right of the photo.
6B15 Cowboy		Tanker uniform	Russia	Widespread use. 6B15 Cowboy is on the left of the photo.
6B21/6B22 Permyachka		Infantry combat suit	Russia	Permyachka is in the center of the photo.
KBS Strelok		Body armor system	Russia	25,000 kits have been delivered.
6B23		Ballistic vest	Russia	Introduced in 2003. No longer produced, being replaced by 6B45.
6B43		Body armor	Russia	Introduced as part of the Ratnik infantry combat system. Basically an early version of 6B45.
6B45		Bulletproof vest	Russia	Introduced as part of the Ratnik infantry combat system.
6B46		Plate Carrier/Ballistic vest	Russia	Introduced as part of the Ratnik infantry combat system. Used in high mobility units (VDV, etc.).
Oberig		Body armor	Russia	Serial production launched in early 2023. A large contract was signed with the Defense Ministry in June 2024 for a modernized version. Supplies of the Oberig-S sapper's armor begun in June 2024.
6Sh117		Load bearing vest	Russia	Introduced as part of the Ratnik infantry combat system.
6B47		Combat helmet	Russia	Introduced as part of the Ratnik infantry combat system.
6B26/6B27/6B28		Combat helmet	Russia	It is expected to replace the SSh-68 and other helmets.
6B7/6B7-1/6B7-1M		Combat helmet	Russia	Replaced in production by 6B47.
SSh-68		Combat helmet	Soviet Union	Being replaced by newer helmets.
PMK gas mask		Gasmask	Soviet Union	
PMK-4 gas mask		Gasmask	Russia	Introduced as part of the Ratnik infantry combat system.
Dublon		Bomb suit	Russia	
OVR-1/2		Bomb suit	Russia	
OVR-3Sh		Bomb suit	Russia	
VKPO		All-weather Field Clothing ensemble	Russia	Supplies of over 100,000 clothing sets begun in March 2024.
VKBO/Modul-Monolit, Pantsir, Kolpak and Tserepakha/Dospekhi-KP-M/Avangard/Chimera/Medoyed and Rosomakha		Clothing ensemble/Individual protection means/Armoured suit/Protective shield/Masking coat/Modular body armors	Russia	
OZK-F Nerekhta/SVI and SLVI-15/SLEV-1		Chemical protection and diving suits/Autonomous local electric heating system	Russia	
		Special uniform for hot climates	Russia	
Strelets-tsasovoi		Guard bracelet system	Russia	
Other equipment
NRS-2		Survival knife	Soviet Union	
Groza.04.K/Chistyulya/Sapfir/Pauk-30BN/Bulat and Nabat		Anti-drone EW systems/Anti-drone EW system for engineering units/Handheld anti-drone net launcher/Portable drone detectors	Russia	
Argus-Antidron		Anti-drone rifle	Russia	
Harpya		Anti-drone rifle	Russia	
Stupor		Anti-drone rifle	Russia	
LPD-801		Anti-drone rifle	Russia	
TPN-NDO/Torn-MDM		Reconnaissance device/Radio reconnaissance device	Russia	
PKhRDD-3		Chemical reconnaissance device	Russia	
Arbalet-1/2 and Malva		Parachutes	Russia	In use by the Special forces.
D-6		Parachute	Russia	
D-10		Parachute	Russia	It has been superseded by the D-12 parachute.
R-187P1 Azart		Handheld combat radio	Russia	Introduced as part of the Ratnik infantry combat system.
SNARK/Namotka-KS and Arakhis		Small-sized satellite communication station/Portable radio stations	Russia	
R-444-PTN Ladya		Small-sized satellite communication station	Russia	
R-438 Barrier-T and R-438M Belozer		Small-sized satellite communication station	Russia	
Prestiz/UGS-1/Groza		Classified communications equipment/Public address equipment/Tropospheric communications station	Russia	Prestiz replaced Selenit equipment. Supplies of modernized Groza stations begun in September 2024.
Osa and Shmel/Polikom		Increased security cellular telephone/Protected IP-telephone equipment	Russia	
KRUS Strelets		Information control and communications system	Russia	Included in the Ratnik infantry combat system. Modernised Strelets-M is also delivered.
INVU-3M Korshun and UR-83P		Mine detectors	Russia	UR-83P Zmey Gorynych demining installation is based on a KAMAZ-5350 vehicle.
IMPS-2 and 3/PIPL and PPO-2I		Mine detectors	Russia	
DP-5V		Radiation dose measuring device	Soviet Union	
IMD-7		Radiation dose measuring device	Russia	
GSA-4		Gas detector	Russia	
1L227 Sobolyatnik-O		Man-portable radar	Russia	
1L271 Aistyonok		Man-portable radar	Russia	
PSNR-8M and Kredo-M1		Man-portable radar	Russia	Kredo is in the photo.
SBR-5M (Fara-VR)		Man-portable battlefield surveillance radar	Russia	
Lesochek		Portable EW station	Russia	
Ironiya and Intrigan/Sextan		Optical surveillance systems/Reconnaissance-signaling equipment	Russia	Ironiya comes in portable and vehicle-mounted versions.
LPR-1 (1D13)		Laser rangefinder	Soviet Union	
LPR-2 "Anode"		Laser Rangefinder	Russia	
LPR-3		Laser Rangefinder	Russia	
LPR-4		Laser Rangefinder	Russia	
1 PN 141-1 and Malish family/Strelok/Integratsiya-64, Operator and Karta-2005		Night vision devices/Ballistic calculator/Geoinformation systems	Russia	
1 PN 140-2 Shakhin		Thermal imager	Russia	
1L111 Fara-1		Radar sight	Russia	
Portable shower-toilet tent		Individual shelter		Reported to be used by the Russian army in January 2026 after photos and videos circulated online of groups of Russian soldiers wearing the shelters. According to Militarnyi, they may reduce the effectiveness of detecting the soldiers by drone, at the cost of severely limiting mobility and awareness.
“Penguin” camouflage suit		Experimental snow camouflage outfit		Reported to be used by the Russian army in January 2026 after footage released by the Ukrainian 120th Territorial Defense Brigade showed Russian soldiers wearing an experimental snow camouflage suit. The suits in the footage were described as bulky, white and penguin-shaped, and according to Ukrainian soldiers, were intended to reduce visual detection in the snow. The Russian soldiers wearing the suits in the footage were detected and struck by drones.

== Future equipment ==
Name	Image	Type	Origin	Notes
Special equipment
1B75 Penicillin		Artillery reconnaissance system	Russia	Completed state tests in 2018. Deliveries started in 2020. Based on a KAMAZ vehicle.
REBovets Valley		Mobile EW system	Russia	Mounted on a tracked platform. Equipped with the Fumigator jammer. Completed testing in June 2024.
Syuzhet-MF		Meteorological station	Russia	Passed tests in January 2024.
		Remotely-controlled machine-gun turret	Russia	Entered service in March 2024.
Solist		Hybrid drone/projectile	Russia	
Tetrazdr		Anti-drone EW system	Russia	Passed tests in April 2024.
Tablet-A		Control system for the automation of artillery fire control	Russia	Completed testing in 2020. First state contracts for its production were concluded. Deliveries were started in June 2024. Upgraded as of August 2024. Tablet-M-IR upgraded version was presented in 2022 and deliveries begun in 2024.
LPK-101 Krechet		Anti-drone sighting system	Russia	Passed trials in June 2024.

Model	Type	Caliber	Origin	Image	Details
Small arms
AK-12K	Carbine	5.45×39mm	Russia		During ARMY-2017, Kalashnikov Concern displayed prototypes of the AK-12K, a short-barreled version of the AK-12.
AK-15K	Carbine	7.62×39mm	Russia		During ARMY-2017, Kalashnikov Concern displayed prototypes of the AK-15K, a short-barreled version of the AK-15.
AM-17	Carbine	5.45×39mm	Russia		
SV-98M	Sniper rifle		Russia		A few units ordered for operational testing and evaluation. In service since May 2020.
Schetnik	Sniper rifle	7.62×51mm NATO	Russia		Serial production launched in January 2023. Chambered for 7.62×51mm NATO.

== Future vehicles ==
Tanks and infantry fighting vehicles
T-14 Armata	Main battle tank	Russia	Based on the Armata Universal Combat Platform. Planned to replace the T-72, T-80 and T-90, which will all go into reserve storage. Several versions will be developed.
T-15 Armata	Heavy infantry fighting vehicle	Russia	Based on the Armata Universal Combat Platform. Heavy infantry fighting vehicle meant to replace the BTR-T.
Kurganets-25	Infantry fighting vehicle/armoured personnel carrier	Russia	Planned to replace the BMP series. It has infantry fighting vehicle and armoured personnel carrier variants.
VPK-7829 Bumerang	Infantry fighting vehicle/armoured personnel carrier	Russia	Planned since 2012 to replace the BTR series.
Anti-aircraft artillery
2S38 Derivatsiya-PVO	Self-Propelled Anti-Aircraft Gun (SPAAG)	Russia	Based on the BMP-3 Infantry fighting vehicle. Planned as a replacement for the ZSU-23-4 Shilka. Completed development in 2023.
9M337 Sosna-R	Short range air defense Surface-to-air missile system	Russia	The system is expected to replace SA-13 Gopher 9K35 Strela-10 air defense systems. The Sosna missile system can be mounted on a BMP-3 chassis or BTR-80 chassis.
Gibka-S	Very Short-Range Air Defence (VSHORAD) System	Russia	Completed trials in 2019. First deliveries conducted in 2022.
Infantry mobility vehicles
AMN-233121 Atlet	Infantry mobility vehicle	Russia	Completed trials in 2021.
Utility, engineering and special vehicles
MKKV-1000	Mobile water treatment and conservation system	Russia	Accepted for supply in 2020. Based on a KAMAZ-63501. Deliveries started in 2021.
KAMAZ ATsPT-5,6	Tank truck	Russia	
Magistr-SV	Automated air defense fire control system	Russia	Completed trials in 2021.
Stalker	Mine-clearing unmanned ground vehicle	Russia	Completed trials in 2024.
Irbis	Counter-battery radar	Russia	Entered service in July 2024.
Impulse-M	Multi-role tracked unmanned ground vehicle	Russia	Various combat modules can be installed on it. Impulse-K variant equipped with a combat module with ATGMs passed trials in August 2024.
Depesha	Multi-role tracked or wheeled unmanned ground vehicle	Russia	Batches were delivered in January and May 2025.
Kurier	Multi-role tracked unmanned ground vehicle	Russia	Armed with an AGS-17 grenade launcher or the Dvoynik sniper system.
	Armored refueling vehicle	Russia	Passed trials and supplies begun in August 2024.

== Animals ==
Name	Image	Type	Notes
Donkey	Equus_africanus_asinus.001_-_Arteixo	Domesticated equine	The use of donkeys for transport started being reported in early 2025 by Russian soldiers and pro-Kremlin bloggers amidst Russian shortages of equipment. Retired Russian Lieutenant General and member of the State Duma's defense committee Viktor Sobolev publicly defended the use of donkeys for delivering cargo in the Russian invasion of Ukraine.
Horse	Horse_Altai_02	Domesticated equine	In early 2025, Russian soldiers were reported to have started using horses for transport to compensate for high equipment losses suffered in the invasion of Ukraine and insufficient production leading to acute equipment shortages.
Camel	Camel in the Attica Zoological Park	Even-toed ungulate	According to international media reports and footage from Ukraine, the Russian military have included camels in their usage of animals in the invasion of Ukraine. A Russian soldier was pictured riding one in February 2025, and Ukrainian soldiers rescued a camel from a captured Russian position in October 2025.
