= GAZ-33097 =

The GAZ-33097 is a transport truck with a 2,000 kg payload, built by the Russian GAZ factory.

The GAZ-33097 is designed to provide cargo transportation in harsh terrain and adverse weather conditions. It is equipped with power steering, driving axles with cam-type self-blocking differential, and radial tires with a pressure regulation system. It is a development of the GAZ-66-11 truck.

== Specifications ==
- power steering system
- driving axles with self-blocking differential of cam type
- Wheel drive formula 4 x 4
- GVW, 6,200 kg
- Payload, 2,000 kg
- GTW, 3,500 kg
- Overall dimensions, (L x W x H), mm 6,125 x 2,340 x 2,505
- Wheelbase, 3,770 mm
- radial tires with the pressure regulation system
- Cargo platform dimensions, 3,300 x 2,050 x 890 mm
- Engine type GAZ 5441 diesel
- Gear box manual, synchronised, five forward speeds and one reverse
- Transfer box mechanical, with direct and
- reduction gear
- Steering re-circulating ball/nut or worm/roller,
- hydraulic booster
- Brake system dual circuit, hydraulic type, with
- vacuum booster in each circuit
- Cabin two seats, driver's seat fully adjustable and suspended
- Max speed, 85/90 km/h
- Fuel consumption, 16 liter/100 km, at constant speed of 60 km/h

=== GAS-33097 modifications ===
Basic chassis equipped with a winch platform

- Weight, 3,655 4,130 4,370 kg
- GVW, 6,200 6,425 kg
- Overall dimensions, 6,125 x 2,340 x 2,505 6,125 x 2,340 x 2,505 6,425 x 2,340 x 2,505 mm

== See also ==
- GAZ-2975 "Tigr"
- GAZ-3937 "Vodnik"
- Ural-4320
- UAZ-469
- Russian Ground Forces
