= KBS Strelok =

Set of body armor developed for Russian Army

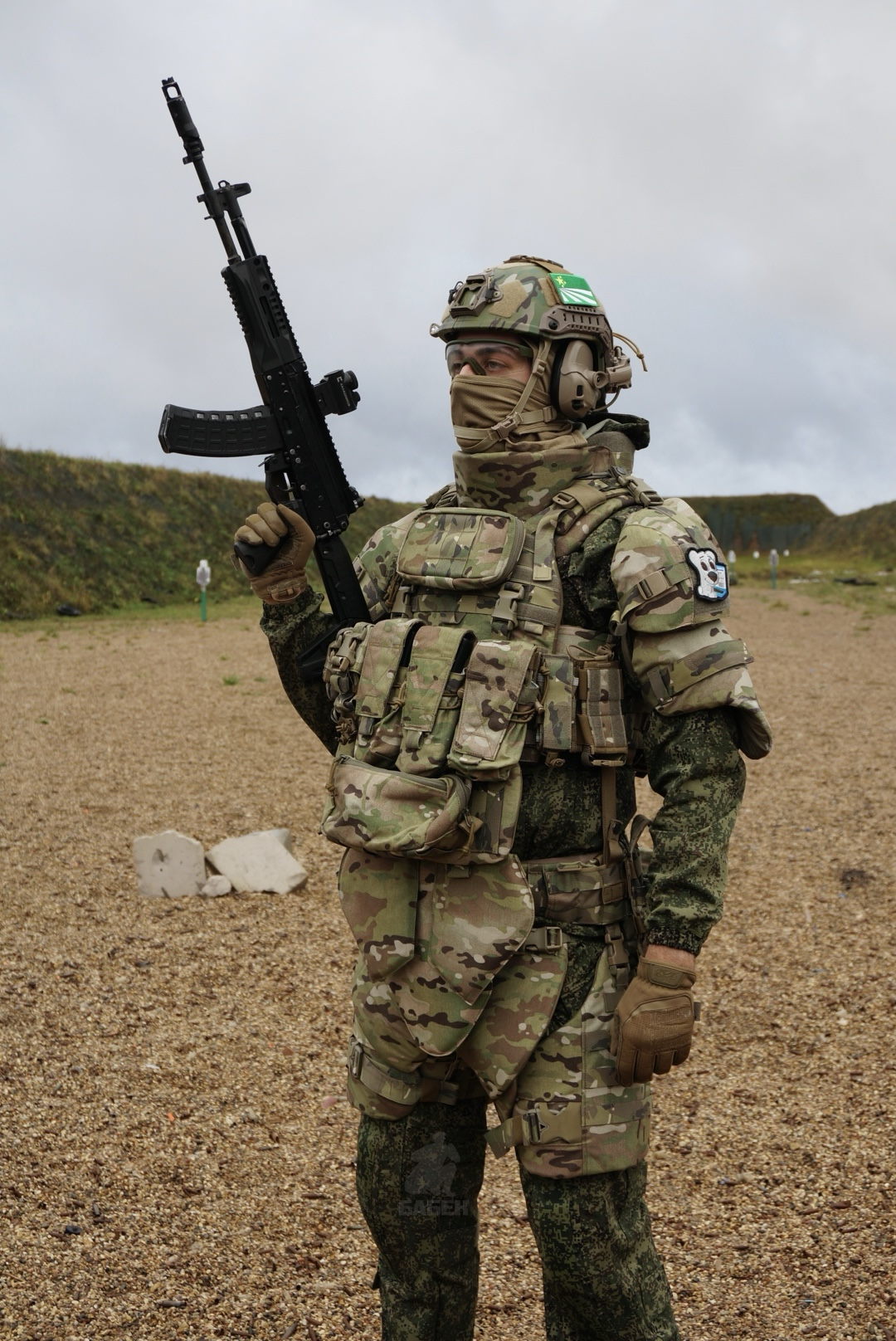
- Ivan Savin from VoenObzor wearing KBS Strelok armor
- Type: Ballistic vest system
- Place of origin: Russian Federation

Service history
- In service: 2023-present
- Used by: Russian Armed Forces
- Wars: Russian Invasion of Ukraine

Production history
- Designer: Triada-TKO (part of Kalashnikov concern)
- No. produced: 25000+

Specifications
- Weight: 12.2 kg (in Corset Plus configuration)

“Strelok” is a set of combat equipment (KBS, Komplekt Boyevogo Snaryazheniya), developed by the Triada-TKO company (part of the Kalashnikov Concern) for delivery to the troops of the Russian Armed Forces. The kit consists of a ballistic vest with a weight distribution system, additional protective modules, a set of pouches, as well as a backpack and a transport bag.

== History ==
The kit was first presented at the Army 2023 exhibition. Kalashnikov Concern started deliveries of KBS Strelok to the Army of Russian Federation in early December 2023, with a goal of delivering 25,000 sets by the end of the year. On 11 January 2024, Kalashnikov reported that all 25,000 sets of equipment were delivered to the troops.

== Description ==
KBS Strelok consists of several elements, including:

- Modular rig system (MRS) (Модульная разгрузочная система, МРС) consisting of a bulletproof vest in the “Corset Plus” configuration. It consists of a front and rear main parts connected at the shoulders and sides; armor pockets on the sides provide for the installation of additional armor plates. The body armor is connected to a belt, which helps redistribute the load from the shoulders. When equipped with GOST class 5 armor plates, the total weight is 12.2 kg.
- Additional protective modules, including protection for the shoulders, upper arms, groin, neck, thighs, and anti-splinter briefs. They provide anti-fragmentation protection according to class Br1 or C2.
- A set of pouches consisting of: 4 universal pouches for 2 rifle magazines, 1 pouch for a pistol magazine, 2 pouches for grenades, 1 pouch for a radio station, a medical pouch with a pouch for a tourniquet, as well as many utilitarian pouches.
- Backpack model T30.
- Bag for carrying.

The GOST class 5 rated armor plates that come with the vest are made by Shchelkovo Silk Weaving Factory, while the anti-fragmentation protection is reportedly produced by NII Stali.
