= 2S40 Floks =

Russian self-propelled artillery

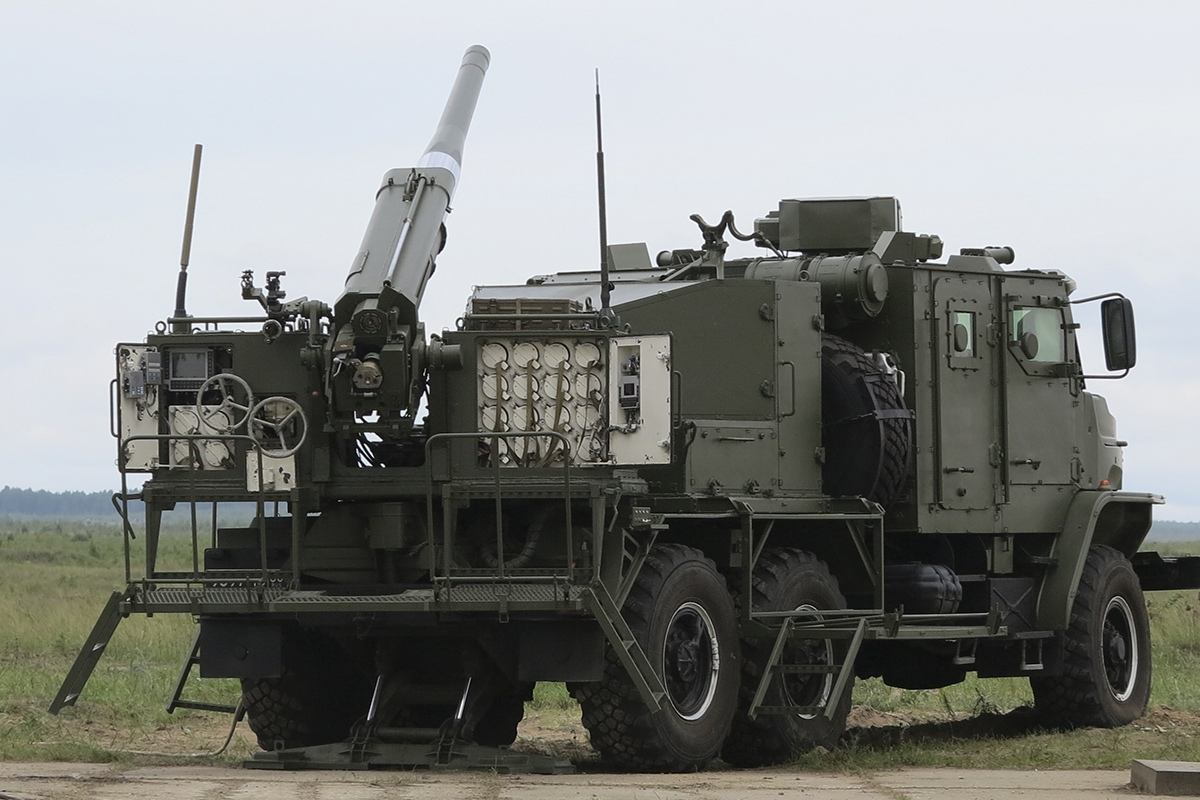

Service history
- In service: 2023–present
- Used by: Russian Ground Forces
- Wars: Russo-Ukrainian War

Specifications
- Mass: 20 tonnes
- Crew: 4
- Caliber: 120mm
- Maximum firing range: 8.5 km (HE), 10 km (guided)

The 2S40 Floks (Russian: 2С40 «Флокс»; "Phlox") is a Russian wheeled self-propelled 120 mm mortar system. It uses a Ural-4320 6x6 truck chassis and has armored crew and ammunition compartments. The vehicle was first shown to the public during the Army-2016 exhibition. The main new feature of the vehicle is a semi-automatic rifled gun, which allows firing of all types of mortar mines and shells (unification with the 2A80 automatic gun-howitzer-mortar, which is also installed on the 2S31 and 2S34): the gun can fire like a howitzer and mortar, and also be used for direct fire. Manufacturer Rostec reported on 5 October 2023 that it had begun to deliver Floks systems to the Russian Armed Forces.

In October 2023, Ukrainian sources published videos of 2S40 systems being hit by FPV loitering munitions, evidencing that the Floks is being used in the Russo-Ukrainian war.

== Operators ==
- Russia
